= RPIMA =

RPIMA may refer to:

- 1er RPIMa
- 3e RPIMa
- 8e RPIMa
