= 11th Parachute Brigade =

- 11^{e} Brigade Parachutiste
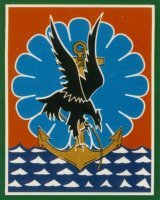
- Active: 11th Light Intervention Division (1961–1963); 11th Division (1963–1971); 11th Parachute Division (1971–1999); 11th Parachute Brigade (1999-present)
- Country: France
- Branch: French Army
- Type: Airborne forces
- Size: 10,200 total (2019): 8,700 active; 1,500 reserve
- Part of: 3rd Division
- Garrison/HQ: Balma, Toulouse
- Anniversaries: Saint-Michael, September 29
- Engagements: Algerian War Operation Tacaud; Operation Bonite; Lebanese Civil War: Multinational Force in Lebanon; Operation Épaulard I; Operation DIODON; Gulf War; Global War on Terrorism (2001–present): War in Afghanistan (2001–present); Operation Licorne; Northern Mali conflict; Operation Serval

Commanders
- Current commander: Olivier Salaün
- Notable commanders: Guy Le Borgne; Paul Arnaud de Foïard; Jeannou Lacaze

Insignia
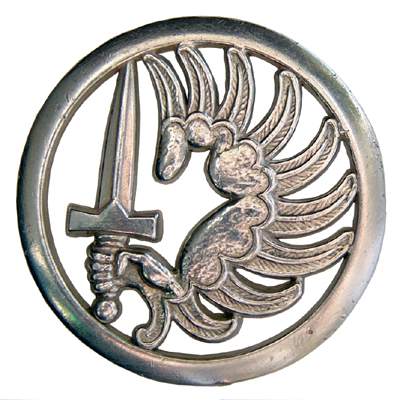
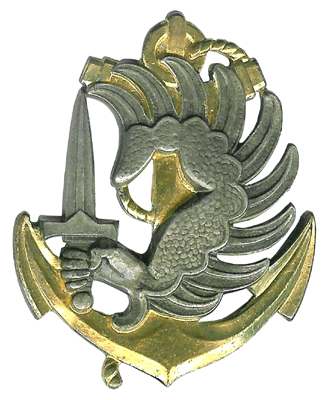
- Identification symbol
- Abbreviation: 11^{e} B.P

The 11th Parachute Brigade (French: 11^{e} Brigade Parachutiste, 11^{e} BP) is one of the French Army's airborne forces brigade, predominantly light infantry, part of the French paratrooper units and specialized in air assault, airborne operations, combined arms, and commando style raids. The brigade's primary vocation is to project in emergency in order to contribute a first response to a situational crisis. An elite unit of the French Army, the brigade is commanded by a général de brigade (Brigadier General) with headquarters in Balma near Toulouse. The brigade's soldiers and airborne Marines wear the red beret (amaranth) except for the Legionnaires of the 2^{ème} REP who wear the green beret.

The 11th Parachute Brigade, originally the 11th Light Intervention Division (11^{e} DLI), was created from airborne units of the 10th Parachute Division 10^{e} D.P and 25th Parachute Division 25^{e} D.P, both dissolved following the Algiers putsch of 1961 during the Algerian War.

== Creation and different nominations ==
- On May 1, 1961; the 11th Light Intervention Division (French: 11^{e} division légère d'intervention) was created from dissolved airborne units of the 10th and 25th Parachute Division.
- On December 1, 1963; the 11th Division was created by merging the 11th Light Intervention Division and the 9th Brigade 9^{e} B.D.E.
- On April 1, 1971; the 11th Division became the 11th Parachute Division (11^{e} DP).
- In June 1999; the 11th Parachute Division became the 11th Parachute Brigade (11^{e} BP).

== Origin and history ==
=== 11th Light Intervention Division – 11^{e} DLI ===
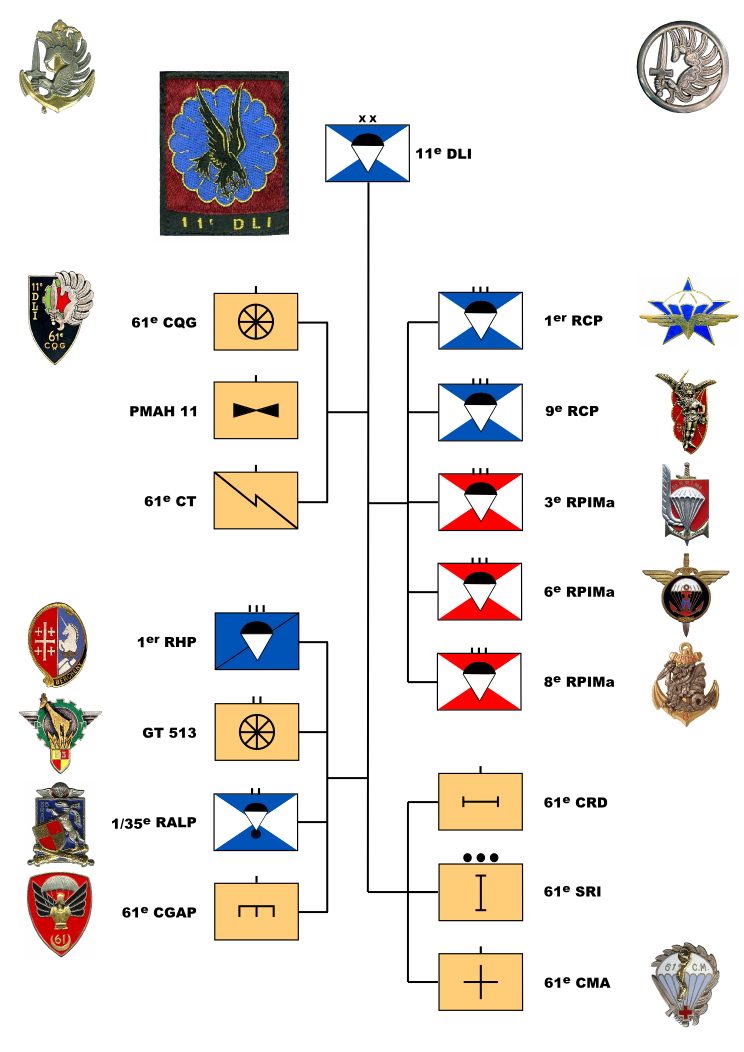
Organizational Chart of the 11th Light Intervention Division on May 1, 1961

The 11th Light Intervention Division was created on May 1, 1961, from airborne elements of the 10th Parachute Division and 25th Parachute Division, both dissolved following the Algiers putsch of 1961, and from the 11th Intervention Division (11^{e} DI), set at the time to create a total of three airborne divisions. The division commanded by General Marzloff returned to mainland France on July 1, 1961. On August 1, 1963, the 13th Parachute Dragoon Regiment leaves the Division and takes garrison in Lorraine at Dieuze and Nancy.

==== Order of battle ====
Since creation the 11th Light Intervention Division comprised the following:

- Command and Support Structure
  - 61st Headquarters Company (61^{e} CQG)
  - 61st Transmission Company (61^{e} CT)
  - French Army Light Aviation (ALAT) Platoon
  - Transport Group 513 (GT 513)
  - 61st Airborne Engineer Company (61^{e} CGAP)
  - 61st Repair Division Company (61^{e} CRD)
  - 61st Medical Company (61^{e} CMA)
  - 61st Provision Section (61^{e} SRI)
- Parachute Infantry
  - 1st Parachute Chasseur Regiment (1^{er} RCP)
  - 9th Parachute Chasseur Regiment (9^{e} RCP)
  - 3rd Marine Infantry Parachute Regiment (3^{e} RPIMa)
  - 6th Marine Infantry Parachute Regiment (6^{e} RPIMa)
  - 8th Marine Infantry Parachute Regiment (8^{e} RPIMa)
- Parachute Artillery
  - 35th Parachute Artillery Regiment (35^{e} RALP)
- Parachute Cavalry
  - 1st Parachute Hussar Regiment (1^{er} RHP)

At the time, there were no regiments of the Foreign Legion in the newly enacted division. On October 1, 1963, the division integrated the BOMAP (Airborne Operational Mobile Base).

=== 11th Division – 11^{e} DIV ===
On December 1, 1963, the 11th Light Intervention Division merged with the 9th Colonial Infantry Division and became the 11th Division. From July 1966 and excluding elements of Division support, the division activated and consisted of three Brigades: the 9th Marine Infantry Brigade at Saint-Malo, the 20th Airborne Brigade (20^{e} BAP) at Toulouse and the 25th Airborne Brigade (25^{e} BAP) at Pau.

A support battalion, the 61^{e} BS, was created on February 1, 1964, at Auch. The 61e BS supervised health services and provisions in the Division. In March, the 61st Airborne Signals Battalion (61e BTAP) steps in at Pau and absorbs the existing signals and communication companies.

In July 1966, the 11th Division reached 16,000 men and consisted of two brigades (the 20^{e} BAP at Toulouse and the 25^{e} BAP at Pau) with five parachute regiments.

==== Order of battle ====
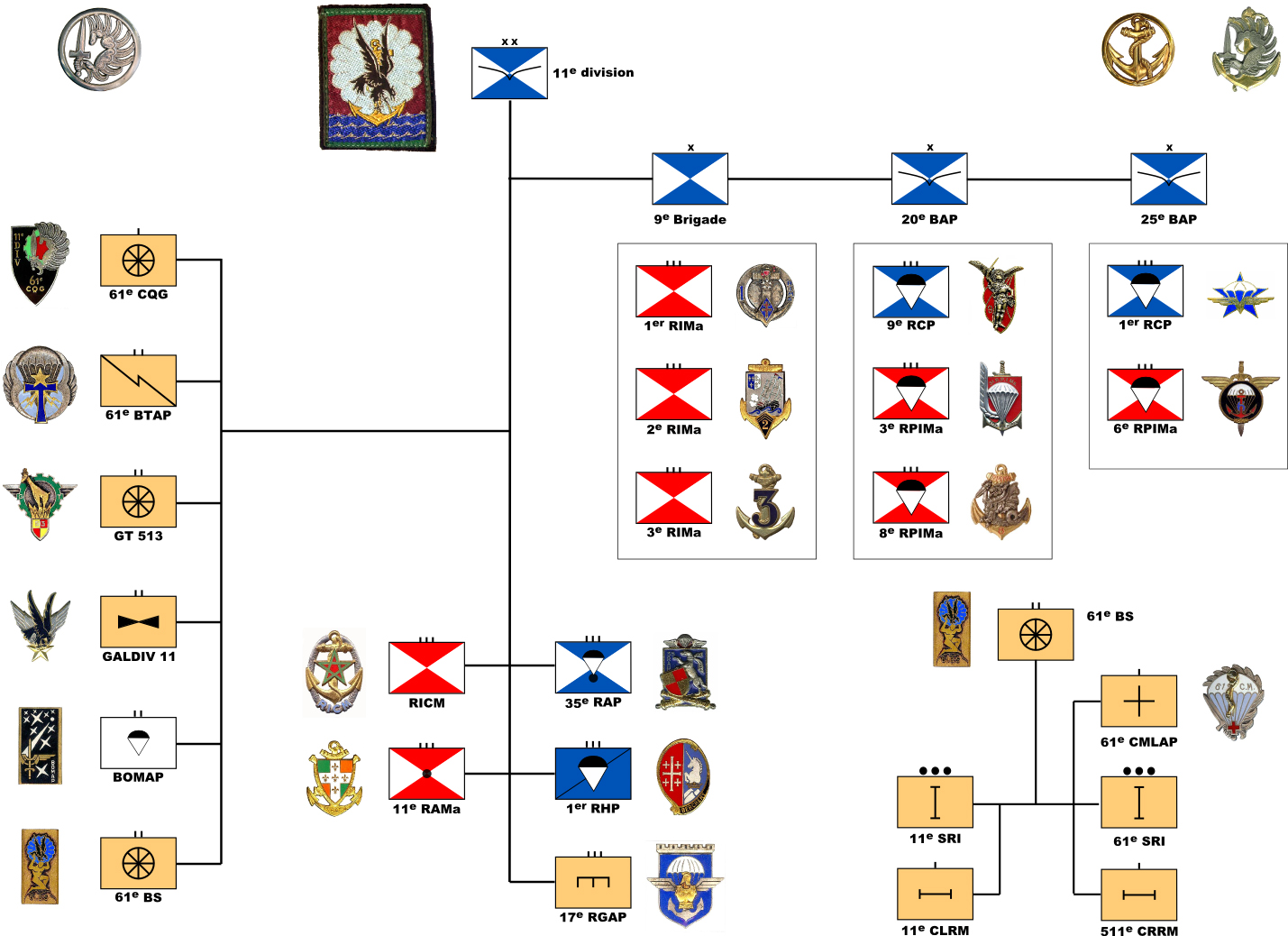
Organizational Chart of the 11th Division on July 1, 1966

- Command and Support Structure
  - 61st Headquarters Company (61^{e} CQG)
  - 61st Airborne Signals Battalion (61^{e} BTAP)
  - 1st Parachute Hussar Regiment (1^{er} RHP)
  - Régiment d'infanterie-chars de marine (RICM), formerly part of the Moroccan Division
  - 35th Parachute Artillery Regiment (35^{e} RAP)
  - 11th Marine Artillery Regiment (11^{e} RAMa) part of current 9th Marine Infantry Brigade
  - 17th Parachute Engineer Regiment (17^{e} RGAP)
  - 5th Helicopter Combat Regiment (5^{e} RHC); Light Aviation Group of the 11th Division (GALDIV 11)
  - Air Mobil Command Post 50/351 (PCAM)
  - Airborne Operational Mobile Base (BOMAP)
  - 61st Support Battalion (61^{e} BS)
    - 61^{e} CMLAP
    - 11^{e} CLRM
    - 511^{e} CRRM
    - 11^{e} and 61^{e} SEI
- 9th Outremer Brigade (9^{e} BOM)
  - 1st Marine Infantry Regiment (1^{e} RIMa)
  - 2nd Marine Infantry Regiment (2^{e} RIMa)
  - 3rd Marine Infantry Regiment (3^{e} RIMa)
  - 409^{e} BS
- 20th Airborne Brigade (20^{e} BAP)
  - 9th Parachute Chasseur Regiment (9^{e} RCP)
  - 3rd Marine Infantry Parachute Regiment (3^{e} RPIMa)
  - 8th Marine Infantry Parachute Regiment (8^{e} RPIMa)
  - CLT N5
- 25th Airborne Brigade (25^{e} BAP)
  - 1st Parachute Chasseur Regiment (1^{er} RCP)
  - 6th Marine Infantry Parachute Regiment (6^{e} RPIMa)
  - CLT N6

=== 11th Parachute Division – 11^{e} DP ===
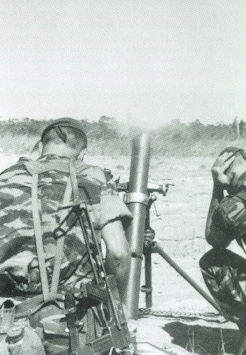
Mortars in action during Operation Bonite at Kolwezi.

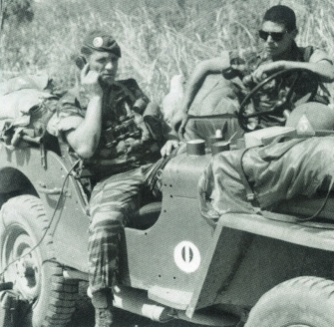
A radio on a jeep at Kolwezi.

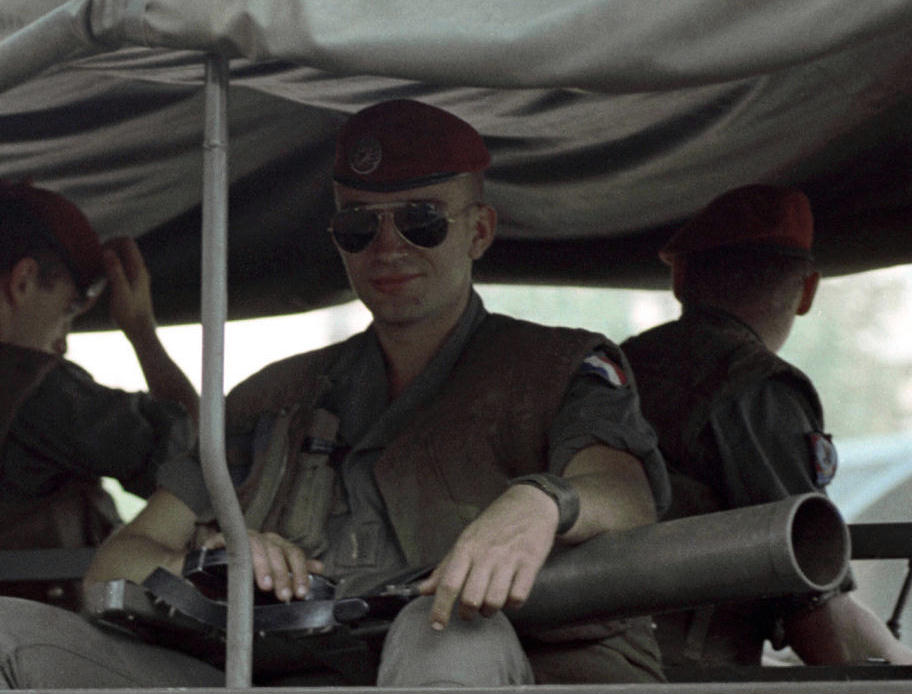
French Paratroopers of the Multinational Force in Lebanon with an LRAC F1 on April 1, 1983.

On April 1, 1971, the 11th Division was renamed the 11th Parachute Division at Toulouse. The 9th Outremer Brigade (9^{e} BOM) left the Division and the 20th (20^{e} BAP) and 25th Airborne Brigades (25^{e} BAP) subsequently became the 1st and 2nd Parachute Brigades and each integrated one support battalion. The three support regiments were reorganized into two interim intervention regiments although retaining their original designations (1st Parachute Hussar Regiment and the 35th Parachute Artillery Regiment). The 17th Parachute Engineer Regiment was dissolved.

==== Order of battle ====
On July 1, 1971, the 11th Parachute Division consisted of the following units:

- Command and Support Structure
  - 61st Headquarter Squadron (61^{e} EQG)
  - 61st Transmission Company (61^{e} CT)
  - 5th Combat Helicopter Regiment (5^{e} RHC); Light Aviation Group Division (GALDIV 11)
  - Airborne Operational Mobile Base (BOMAP)
  - Air Mobile Command Post 50/351 (PCAM)
- 1st Parachute Brigade (1^{re} BP)
  - 9th Parachute Chasseur Regiment (9^{e} RCP)
  - 3rd Marine Infantry Parachute Regiment (3^{e} RPIMa)
  - 8th Marine Infantry Parachute Regiment (8^{e} RPIMa)
  - 35th Parachute Artillery Regiment (35^{e} RAP)
  - 420th Command and Support Battalion (420^{e} BCS)
- 2nd Parachute Brigade (2^{e} BP)
  - 1st Parachute Chasseur Regiment (1^{er} RCP)
  - 2nd Foreign Parachute Regiment (2^{e} REP)
  - 6th Marine Infantry Parachute Regiment (6^{e} RPIMa)
  - 1st Parachute Hussar Regiment (1^{er} RHP)
  - 425th Command and Support Battalion (425^{e} BCS)

On August 1, 1973, the 61st Headquarter Squadron and the 61st Transmission Company were amalgamated and formed the 61^{e} BCT. The following year, in 1974, the 17th Parachute Engineer Regiment was reformed and the interarm regiments find their specialities. On August 1, 1974, the 1st Marine Infantry Parachute Regiment (1^{e} RPIMa) was reattached to the Division.

Units belonging to the 2nd Foreign Parachute Regiment (2^{e} REP) and the 35th Parachute Artillery Regiment (35^{e} RAP) took part in Operation Tacaud starting from 1978 in Chad.

In 1978, and within the cadre of military cooperation with Zaïre which anticipates assistance and formation, the 2nd Foreign Prachute Regiment is parachuted in during the Battle of Kolwezi, and participated in the rescue mission at Kolwezi together with Belgian paratroopers. During this intervention, two teams of the 13th Parachute Dragoon Regiment and one team from the 1st Marine Parachute Infantry Regiment (1^{e} RPIMa) were deployed to forward operating terrain on observation and reconnaissance missions.

During this time, France had an intervention force 20,000 strong consisting of the 11th Parachute Division, the 9th Marine Infantry Division (9^{e} DIMa), aerial forces and Naval contingents.

On October 23, 1983, one company of the 1st Parachute Chasseur Regiment stationed in Lebanon with the Multinational Force in Lebanon lost 55 paratroopers from the 1^{er} RCP in the 1983 Beirut barracks bombing. Three paratroopers from the 9th Parachute Chasseur Regiment were also killed.

In the aftermath of the Cold War, the French Army reorganised and the 11^{e} DP became the 11th Parachute Brigade in 1999.

== 11th Parachute Brigade – 11^{e} BP ==
In 1999, as part of the restructuring of the French Army, the 11th Parachute Brigade was formed at Balma (Balman Toulouse Garrison), the base of the 11th Parachute Division. The brigade would later be engaged in Africa and Afghanistan.

=== Africa ===
The 11th Parachute Brigade, mainly the 2nd Foreign Parachute Regiment (2^{e} REP), took part in Opération Licorne in the Ivory Coast.

=== Afghanistan ===
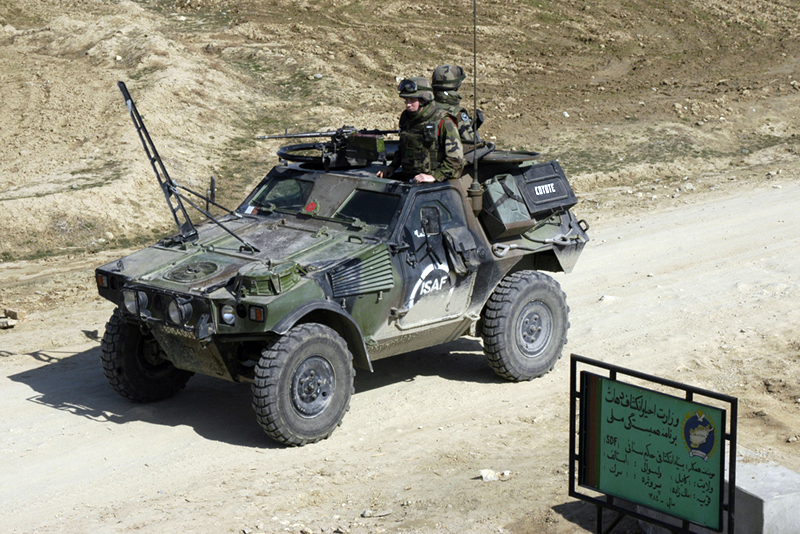
A light armored vehicle of the 1^{er} Régiment de Hussards Parachutistes in 2006 in Afghanistan.

From 2006 to 2007, the parachute brigade intervened in Afghanistan as part of the French Detachment of NATO's International Force. In September 2007, the brigade was relieved by Chasseurs Alpins of the 27th Mountain Infantry Brigade (27^{e} BIM).

On 18 August 2008, a unit of the 8th Marine Infantry Parachute Regiment (8^{e} RPIMa) lost eight men during the Uzbin Ambush.

The paratroopers of the 1st Parachute Chasseur Regiment (1^{er} RCP), of the 11th Parachute Brigade, took up its first rotation, and was in place by Sunday, 1 May 2011, in Kapisa Province. Four more rotations would follow. A total of 650 military personnel were scheduled for a mission to maintain zonal security.

On 10 May 2011, two combat parachute companies of the 1^{e} RCP—almost 200 men commanded by général Emmanuel Maurin, commander of the 11th Parachute Brigade—were projected east towards Nijrab District, on a mission lasting several months. As a result, 1000 paratroopers were engaged in Afghanistan, principally from the 1^{e} RCP, which were supported by the 11th Parachute Brigade, the 1st Parachute Hussar Regiment, the 17th Parachute Engineer Regiment, 35th Parachute Artillery Regiment, and the 1st Train Parachute Regiment.

From April to October 2001, while preparing for this mission, the 11th brigade rehearsed realistic simulations, in order to achieve operational readiness within the newly established Brigade La Fayette joint command. In Afghanistan, reinforcements served for periods from 6 months to a year in Nijrab District, in northeastern Kapisa Province, while attached to the Tactical Interam Group of Kapisa (TIGK).

As of June 20, 2011, the 11th Parachute Brigade was the brigade that endured the most losses, with 18 casualties, in Afghanistan.

=== Mali ===
In January 2013, 250 French paratroopers from the 2nd Foreign Parachute Regiment (2^{e} REP), 11th Parachute Brigade, jumped into Northern Mali to support an offensive to capture the city of Timbuktu.

=== Present Brigade ===
==== Mission ====
The 11th Parachute Brigade is a light mobile brigade capable of projecting power around the world in an emergency, as a first response to a crisis.

==== Superior commands ====
The 11th Parachute Brigade is the only parachute brigade of the French Army and is under Ground Forces Command. However, the brigade does not comprise all the parachutes regiments of France, as the 1st Marine Infantry Parachute Regiment (1^{er} RPIMa) and the 13th Parachute Dragoon Regiment (13^{e} RDP) are attached to the French Army Special Forces Brigade, while the 2nd Marine Infantry Parachute Regiment (2^{e} RPIMa)—stationed permanently in outre-mer, near Réunion island—is under the command of the Armed Forces Zones of the Indian Ocean (FAZSOI).

==== Order of battle ====
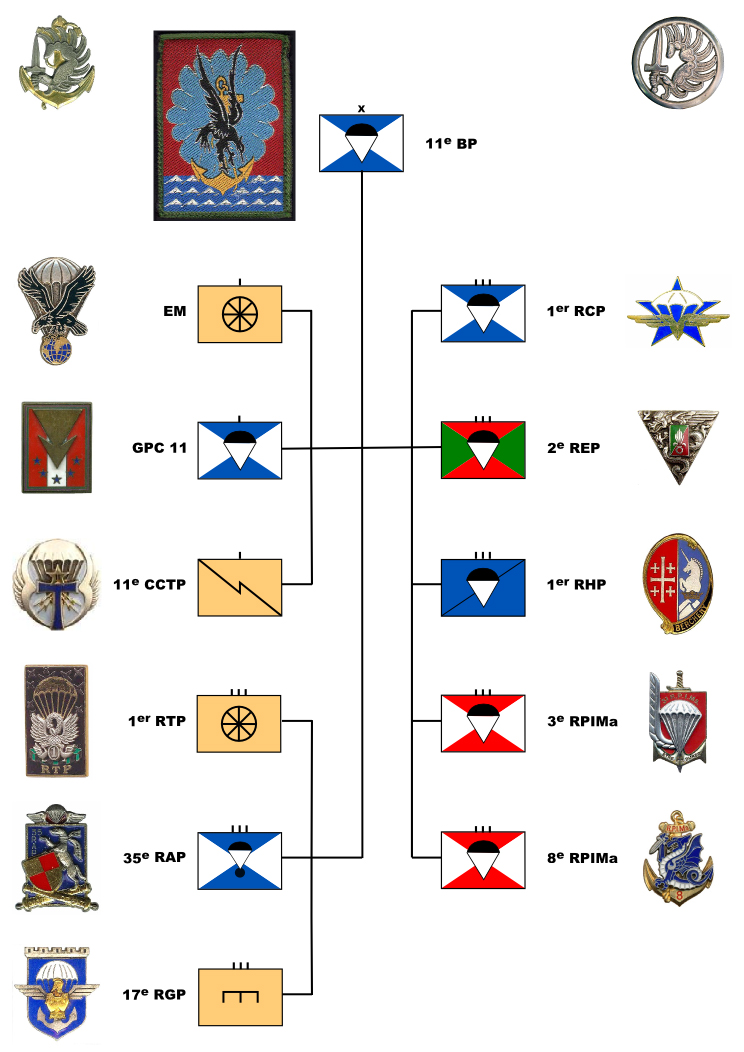
Organizational Chart of the 11th Parachute Brigade in 2011

The 11th Parachute Brigade is composed primarily of infantry, with elements of artillery, light cavalry, and combat-engineer regiments. The brigade also includes a Commando Parachute Group (GCP), an elite unit of pathfinders.

At the beginning of 2000, the brigade was based in southwestern France, except for the 2nd Foreign Parachute Regiment (2^{e} REP) stationed in Calvi, Corsica. The brigade consists of 10,200 active and reserve personnel distributed in a central headquarters command and 8 operational regiments with the following composition:

- Central Command
  - General Headquarters in Balma.
  - 11th Parachute Command Transmission Company (11^{e} CCTP) at Balma.
  - Commando Parachute Group Teams.
- Combat Parachute Regiments
  - 1^{er} Régiment de Hussards Parachutistes (1^{er} RHP) Parachute Hussar Regiment in Tarbes with ERC 90.
  - 1^{er} Régiment de Chasseurs Parachutistes (1^{er} RCP) Parachute Chasseur Regiment in Pamiers.
  - 2^{e} Régiment Etranger de Parachutistes (2^{e} REP) Foreign Legion Parachute Regiment in Calvi.
  - 3^{e} Régiment de Parachutistes d'Infanterie de Marine (3^{e} RPIMa) Marine Parachute Regiment in Carcassonne.
  - 8^{e} Régiment de Parachutistes d'Infanterie de Marine (8^{e} RPIMa) Marine Parachute Regiment in Castres.
- Combat Parachute Support Regiments
  - 1st Train Parachute Regiment, Parachute Supply Regiment in Toulouse
  - 35^{e} Régiment d'Artillerie Parachutiste (35^{e} RAP) Parachute Artillery Regiment in Tarbes with TRF1 howitzers, CAESAR self-propelled howitzers and RTF1 mortars.
  - 17^{e} Régiment du Génie Parachutiste (17^{e} RGP) Parachute Engineer Regiment in Montauban.

=== Equipment ===
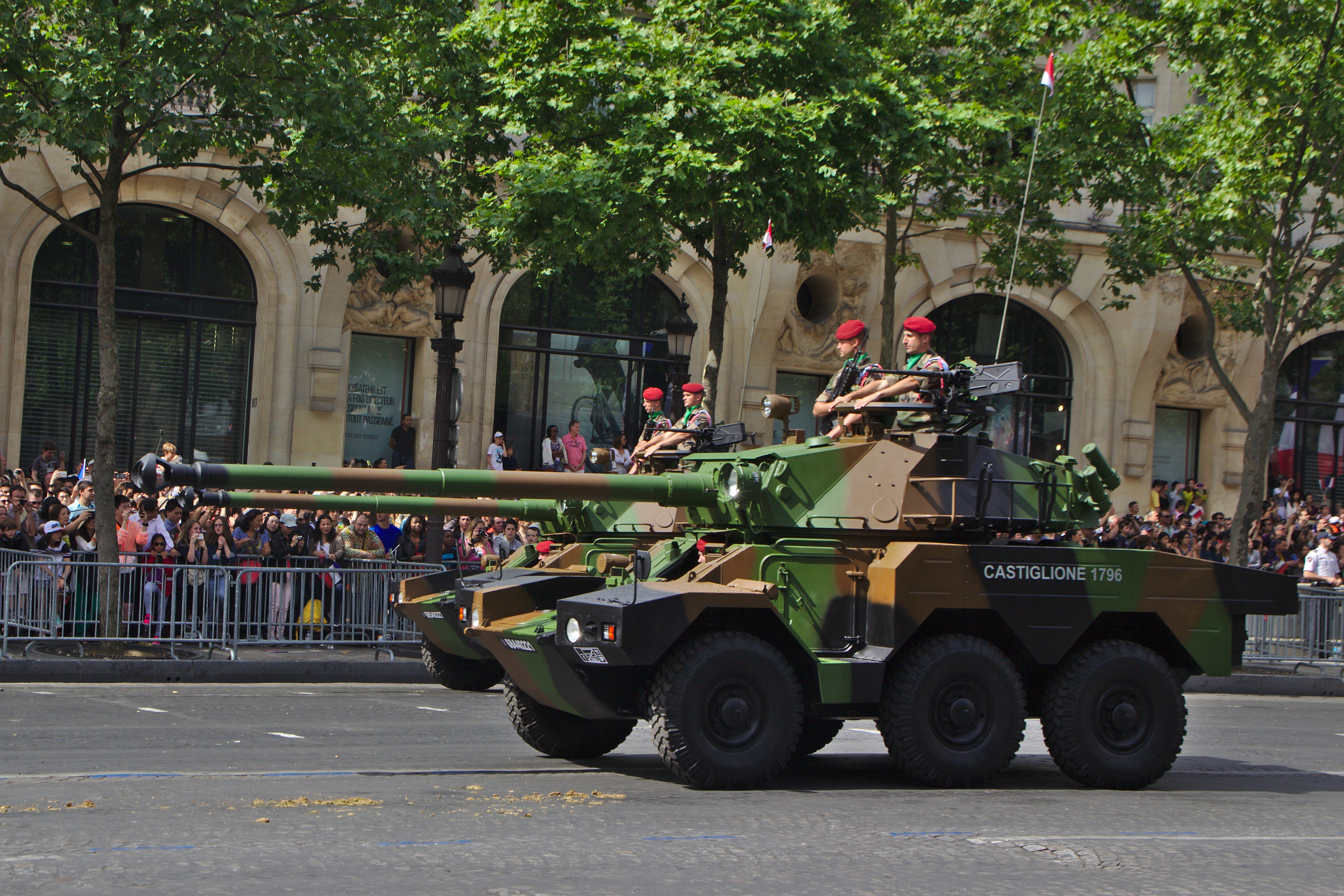
ERC-90 of the 1^{er} Régiment de Hussards Parachutistes.

==== Vehicles ====
- ERC-90 Sagaie
- Véhicule Blindé Léger Panhard (VBL)
- Véhicule de l'Avant Blindé (VAB)
- Airmobil Logistical Vehicle Auverland A3F (ALV)
- Small Protected Vehicle (SPV)
- All Terrain Vehicle Peugeot P4 (ATVP P4)
- Light Recon Support Vehicle (LRSV)
- TRM 2000 Truck (TRM)
- Vehicle Transport Logistique (VTL)
- Tracto-chargeur TC 910
- Mini benne TWAITES TND3
- Caterpillar D3 air-transportable

==== Armament ====
===== Artillery =====
- CAESAR self-propelled howitzers
- 120mm F1 Mortars
- Mistral Surface to Air Missiles

===== Support Weapons =====
- 81 mm Mortar
- Anti-Tank Firing Missile Milan (Milan)
- Anti-Tank Firing Missile Eryx (Eryx)

===== Small Arms =====
- AT-4 84 mm Anti-Tank weapons
- FN Minimi Light Machine Gun
- 51 mm Grenade Launcher F1 Model (GLF1)
- 12.7mm Hécate High Caliber Precision rifle
- 7.62 FRF2 Precision Rifle
- 5.56 Famas Assault Rifle F1

=== Traditions ===
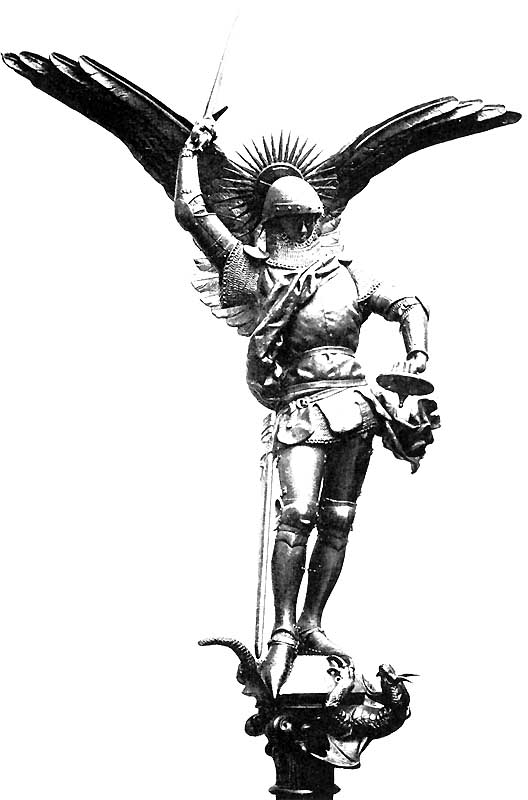
The Archangel Michael featured in Mont Saint-Michel and the Insignia of the 9th Parachute Chasseur Regiment.

Except for the troops of the 1^{e} REG, 2^{e} REG, 2^{e} REP who wear a green beret, the French army metropolitan and marine paratroopers forming the 11th Parachute Brigade wear a red Beret.

The saint's day of Archangel Saint Michael, patron of French paratroopers, is celebrated on 29 September.

The prière du Para (Prayer of the Paratrooper) was written by André Zirnheld in 1938.

==== Insignia ====
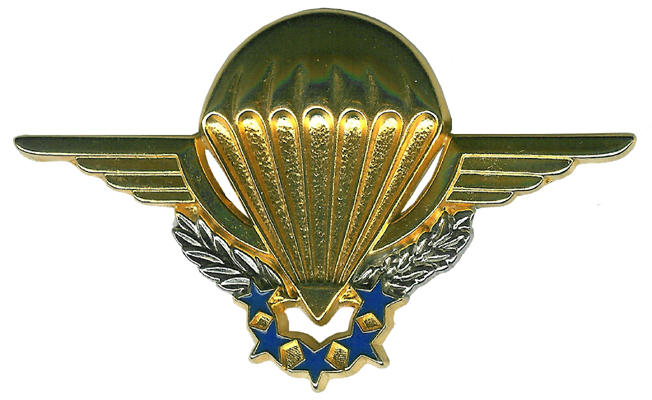
French Commando Parachute Group Brevet of Chuteur Opérationnel

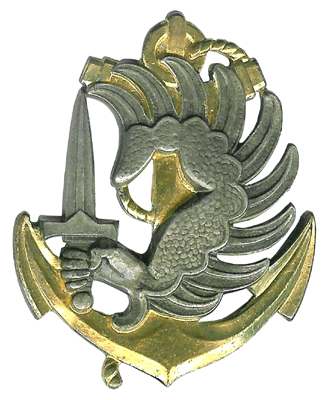
Anchored Winged Armed Dextrochere of French Army Marine Infantry Paratroopers

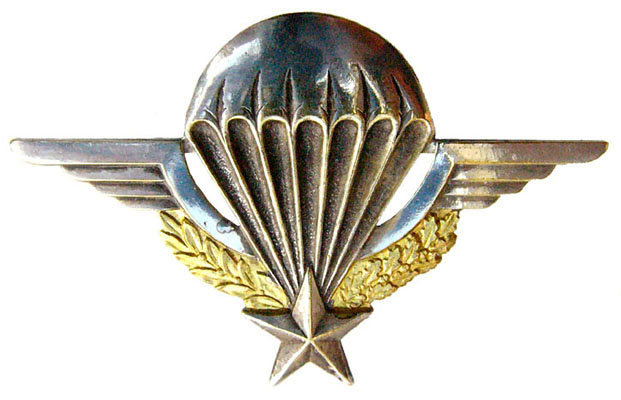
French Parachute Brevet.

With the paratrooper brevet of the French Army, the insignia of French paratroopers was created in 1946. The French Army insignia of metropolitan paratroopers consists of a closed "winged armed dextrochere", ("right winged arm") with a sword pointing upwards. The insignia makes reference to the patron saint of paratroopers and represents "the right Arm of Saint Michael", the Archangel, which, according to Liturgy, is the "armed arm of God". This insignia is the symbol of righteous combat and fidelity to superiors and to the mission. The French Army Insignia of Marine Infantry Paratroopers is over a marine anchor.

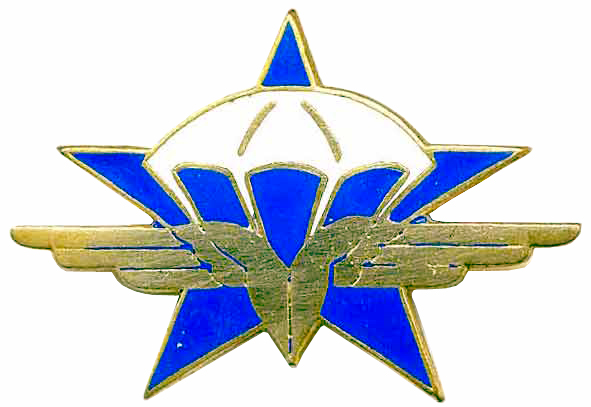
Insignia of 1^{e} Régiment de Chasseurs Parachutistes

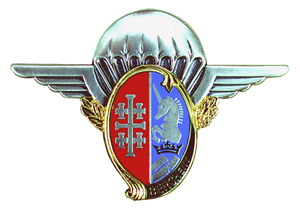
Insignia of 1^{er} Régiment de Hussards Parachutistes

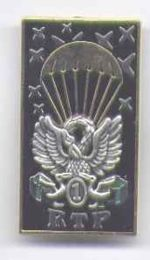
Insignia of 1st Parachute Train Transport Regiment
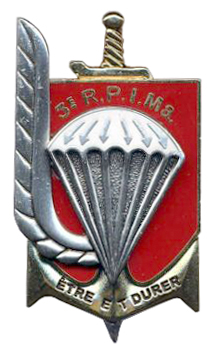
Insignia of 3^{e} Régiment de Parachutistes d'Infanterie de Marine

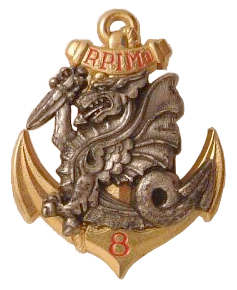
Insignia of 8^{e} Régiment de Parachutistes d'Infanterie de Marine

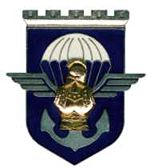
Insignia of 17^{e} Régiment du Génie Parachutiste

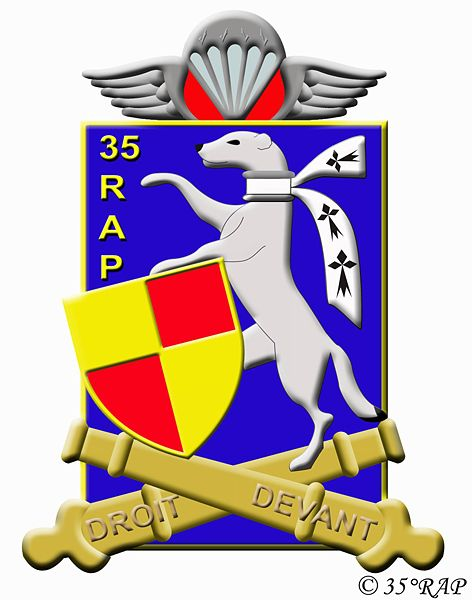
Insignia of 35^{e} Régiment d'Artillerie Parachutiste

=== Brigade Commanders ===
11th Light Intervention Division (1961–1963)

- 1961–1963 – général Marzloff
- 1963–1963 – général Boussarie

11th Division (1963–1971)

- 1963–1965 – général Boussarie
- 1965–1966 – général Lalande
- 1967–1969 – général Hubert de Seguins-Pazzis
- 1969–1971 – général Lefort

11th Parachute Division (1971–1999)

- 1971–1971 – général Lefort
- 1971–1973 – général Compagnon
- 1973–1975 – général Le Borgne
- 1975–1977 – général de Foïard
- 1977–1979 – général Lacaze
- 1979–1981 – général Jacques Lemaire
- 1981–1983 – général Maurice Schmitt
- 1983–1985 – général Brette
- 1985–1987 – général Chazarain
- 1987–1989 – général Michel Guignon
- 1989–1991 – général de Courrèges
- 1991–1993 – général Raymond Germanos
- 1993–199x – général Hervé Gobilliard
- 1994–1996 – général Maurice Godinot
- 1996–1998 – général André Soubirou
- 1998–1999 – général Marcel Valentin

11th Parachute Brigade (1999–present)

- 1999–2001 – général Henri Poncet
- 2001–2002 – général Christian Damay
- 2002–2004 – général Emmanuel Beth
- 2004–2006 – général Jacques Lechevalier
- 2006–2008 – général Jean-Marc Duquesne
- 2008–2010 – général Bosser
- 2010–2011 – général Emmanuel Maurin
- 2011–2013 – général Patrice Paulet
- 2013–2015 – général Olivier Salaün
- 2015–2017 – général des Minières
- 2017–2019 – général Patrick Collet
- 2019–present – général Jacques Langlade de Montgros

== See also ==
- Chief of the Defence Staff of the Armed Forces (French: Chef d'État-Major des Armées, CEMA)
  - Chief of Staff of the French Army (French: Chef d'État-Major de l'Armée de Terre, CEMAT)
  - Chief of Staff of the French Air Force (French: Chef d'État-Major de l'Armée de l'Air, CEMAA)
  - Chief of Staff of the French Navy (French: Chef d'État-Major de la Marine, CEMM)
  - Direction générale de la Gendarmerie Nationale (French: Direction Générale de la Gendarmerie nationale (DGGN))
  - French Special Operations Command (French: Commandement des Opérations Spéciales (COS))
- Franco-German Brigade
- Honneur et Fidélité
- List of French paratrooper units
