= Tourret =

Tourret is a French surname. Notable people with the surname include:

- Alain Tourret (born 1947), French politician
- Charles Gilbert Tourret (1795–1858), French agronomist and politician
- Christian Tourret (born 1946), French athlete
- Philippe Tourret (born 1967), French athlete
- Pierre Tourret (1919–1991), French army officer
