= 17th Parachute Engineer Regiment =

- 17^{e} Régiment du Génie Parachutiste
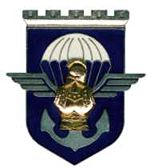
- Regimental insigne
- Active: March 1, 1944
- Country: France
- Branch: French Army
- Type: Airborne Engineer
- Role: Para Demining
- Part of: 1st Army 25th Airborne Division; 10th Parachute Division; 25th Parachute Division; 11th Light Intervention Division; Interarm Unit with 1st Parachute Hussard Regiment; Interarm Unit with 35th Parachute Artillery Regiment; 11th Division; 11th Parachute Brigade 3rd Division
- Garrison/HQ: Montauban, France
- Nicknames: French: « Le couteau suisse de la brigade parachutiste (English: « The Swiss Army knife of the Parachute Brigade) » « Les démineurs de l'espoir » (English: « Hope's demining specialists »)
- Colors: Red and Black
- Mascots: Royal Eagle « Bac-Kan » then Bald eagle « Malizia »
- Engagements: World War II; First Indochina War; Algerian War; Lebanese Civil War: United Nations Interim Force in Lebanon; Multinational Force in Lebanon; Gulf War; War on terror (2001-present): War in Afghanistan (2001–present)
- Abbreviation: 17^{e} RGP

The 17th Parachute Engineer Regiment (French: 17^{e} Régiment de Génie Parachutiste, 17^{e} RGP) is heir to the traditions of the 17th Colonial Engineer Regiment (French: 17^{e} Régiment Colonial du Génie, 17^{e}RGC) which fought illustriously during the Second World War . It is the only airborne engineer unit of the French Army forming the engineering component of the 11th Parachute Brigade and secures all the specific airborne engineering missions relative to para assaulting at the level of deep reconnaissance as well as operations relative to para demining and handling explosives. The regiment has been present non-stop since 1975 on all theatres of operations (Lebanon, Tchad, New Caledonia, French Guiana, Pakistan, Kurdistan, Kuwait, Cambodia, Somalia, Rwanda, Gabon, Mozambique, ex-Yugoslavia, Albania, Kosovo, Afghanistan, Mali and others). For its various combat operational deployments, the 17^{e} RGP was cited 3 times at the orders of the armed forces, 2 times at the orders of the armed forces corps, and three of its combat companies cited at the orders of the armed forces ( 2nd combat company) in addition to armed forces corps (1st and 3rd combat companies).

== History since 1870 ==
- 1870–1871: creation of the 17th company, 2nd Engineer Regiment: took part in the defense of Paris, Saint-Denis, Mont-Valérien, Bourgets combats, battles of Champigny and Buzenval, founders of bridges at Marne.
- 1876: creation of an engineer battalion and intervention in Algeria.
- 1881: 1st combat company of the 17th participated to an expedition in Tunisia.
- 1912: 4 combat companies participated to an expedition in Morocco.
- 1914–1918: 23 combat companies of the 17th Engineer Battalion battled in Ardennes Belge, Marne, Champagne, Artois, Verdun, Aisne, Flandres, Oise, Woëvre.
- 1916–1920: 4 combat companies of the 17th intervened in Morocco, attached to the Moroccan Division.
- 1923: creation of the 17th Engineer Regiment, the 1st battalion of the regiment was stationed at Strasbourg, the second was dispatched to the French Army of the Rhin at Biebrich in Germany.
- 1928: the 17th Engineer Regiment became the 1st Engineer Regiment.
- 1940: 2 combat engineer companies of the 17th battled in l'Oise. Creation of the 17th Battalion at Castersarrasin (Tarn and Garonne) which became the 5th Engineer Battalion.
- 1944–1945: creation of the 17th Colonial Engineer Battalion in Morocco. The Battalion was detached to Corsica and battled at Toulon ( battle campaigns of France and Germany) at the corps of the 1st Army (Rhin and Danube).
- 1946–1949: creation of the 17th Airborne Engineer Battalion attached to the 25th Airborne Division.
- 1947: a combat section of paratrooper Pioneers intervened in Indochina at the corps of the 61st Colonial Engineer Battalion.
- 1948: a combat section of the paratrooper pioneers intervened in Indochina at the corps of the 71st Colonial Engineer Battalion
- 1948–1953: 3 successive combat sections of paratrooper pioneers of the 17th Airborne Engineer Battalion (17^{e} B.G.A.P) intervened in Indochina.
- 1950: volunteer engagement of the 17th Airborne Engineer Battalion to the United Nations French formed battalion participating in the Korean War.
- 1953: regrouping of the combat sections of the paratrooper pioneers of Indochina from 17th Airborne Engineer Battalion for the creation of the 17th Parachute Engineer Company which would intervene in the Battle of Dien Bien Phu part of Operation Castor.
- 1954: creation of the 3rd combat company of Vietnamese Airborne Engineers in Indochina commanded and formed by the cadres of the 17th Parachute Engineer Company.
- 1953–1962: the 1st combat company of the 17th Airborne Engineer Battalion intervened in Algeria and became in 1955 the 60th Airborne Engineer Company attached to the 10th Parachute Division. The combat company intervened in Egypt in 1956 and in 1961 at Bizerte (Tunisia).
- 1956–1962: the 75th Airborne Engineer Company issued from the 3rd combat company of the 17th Airborne Battalion Regiment was attached to the 25th Parachute Division. The company became in 1961 the 61st Airborne Engineer Regiment and intervened in Bizerte.
- 1958: creation of the center of instruction of Airborne Engineers '17' at Castersarrasin.
- 1961–1962: creation, conception and placing in effect the first Commando Instruction Center (C.E.C) at Fort de Charlemont of Givet in the department of Ardennes by the 61st Airborne Engineer Company and the 1st Commando Parachute Group. The main section of the 61st Airborne became the Commando Instruction Center of the 11th Light Intervention Division (11^{e} D.L.I). This Division replaced the 10th Parachute Division and 25th Parachute Division.
- 1963: creation of the 17th Airportable Engineer Regiment (17^{e} R.G.A.P) at Castelsarrasin from the paratrooper pioneers of the engineer Center of Instruction and from the two combat companies back from Algeria.
- 1971: the regiment was dissolved, the 1st and 2nd combat companies of the airportable engineer regiment were attached respectively to the 1st Parachute Hussar Regiment, 1^{e}RHP and the 35th Parachute Artillery Regiment, 35^{e}RAP becoming inter-arm units. At the corps of these two regiments, the two airborne engineer companies maintained their missions and traditions of "Génie Parachutiste".
- 1974: recreation of the 17th Airportable Engineer Regiment at Montauban (Tarn and Garonne).
- 1978: the 17th became the 17th Parachute Engineer Regiment (17^{e} R.G.P).
- 1982–1984: the 17th Parachute Engineer Regiment took part extensively and heavily in both the Multinational Force in Lebanon within the 31st Brigade and the United Nations Interim Force in Lebanon placed in ground operations since 1978.
- 1990–1991: the 17th Parachute Engineer Regiment took part in the Gulf War part of the Opération Daguet.
- 2001: the 17th Parachute Engineer Regiment spearheaded combat, combat support, peacekeeping, multipurposed operations through the war on terror and has been seen taking part in all exterior theatres of operations of the French Armed Forces on all five continents.

== Creation and different designations since 1944 ==
- Created on March 1, 1944 at Port Lyautey in Morocco under the designation of the 17th Colonial Engineer Regiment (French: 17^{e} Régiment Colonial du Génie) 17^{e}RGC. Dissolved on November 16, 1945.
- Reformed on August 1, 1946 in Algeria, from the 91st Engineer Battalion which provided airborne engineer support to the 25th Parachute Division, under the designation of 17th Engineer Battalion. Combat companies 17/9 stationed at Hussein Dey, the 17/1 at Bougie, the 17/2 at Marocco, the 17/3 at Mont-de-Marsan. Dissolved with the division in July 1948, a combat engineer Group designated (17) was integrated at the center of specialized airborne troops until February 1949.
- The airborne engineer group (17) was redesignated the 17th Airborne Engineer Battalion on February 15, 1949 and was based within Metropolitan France at Castelsarras in Tarn-and-Garonne under the successive designations 17th Airborne Engineer Battalion, Center of Instruction of Airborne Engineer (17), 17th Airborne Engineer Regiment. Dissolved on June 30, 1971, two combat companies of the Airborne Engineer troops joined the two combined-arms paratrooper regiments in Tarbes and Auch, mainly the 35th Parachute Artillery Regiment and the 1st Parachute Hussard Regiment.
- Reconstituted at Montauban on July 1, 1974 under the designation of the 17th Airborne Engineer Regiment from the companies of parachute engineers forming the inter-arm regiments, based in garrison Doumer. In 1978, the airborne engineer regiment was designated as the 17th Parachute Engineer Regiment.

== Structure ==
The Regiment of volunteer paratroopers, the 17th Parachute Engineer Regiment is articulated in 6 combat companies and 1 detachment:

- 1 Command and logistic company (CCL)
- 1 Combat support company (CA) known as la verte et amarante, regrouping means of terrain organization
  - 2 sections of combat support for emergency deployments
  - Commando Parachute Group, known as Commando Guéniat, named after an Adjudant-chef killed in action in an operation.
- 3 combat companies with the 4th on its way:
  - 1st combat company
  - 2nd combat company
  - 3rd combat company
- intervention reserve unit: 5th combat company
- 1 combat detachment

== Mascot ==
The mascot of the regiment was initially the Golden eagle named "Bac Kan" in reference to the first mission participation of the Airborne engineers in Indochina during the airborne operation "Lea" in October 1947.

Since 2014, the mascot is a Bald eagle named "Malizia", name of François Grimaldi ( said "François la Malice") who in the 13th century conquered the Rock of Monaco.

== Traditions ==
The regiment wears the Red Beret. Regimental Colours:

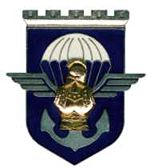
17th Parachute Engineer Regiment insignia

Battle Honours:

- Germerscheim 1944
- AFN [Afrique française du Nord] 1952-1962 (Algerian War)

=== Regimental Songs ===
- L'Adieu suisse

Nous étions trop heureux, mon amie,
Nous avions trop d'espoir et d'amour,
Nous croyions nous aimer pour la vie, (bis)
Mais, hélas, les beaux jours sont si courts. (bis)

Le bonheur dure trop peu sur la terre !
Entends-tu tout là bas le tambour ?
Mon doux cœur je m'en vais à la guerre, (bis)
Ne crains rien jusqu'à l'heure du retour. (bis)

L'ennemi a franchi nos frontières,
Il a pris nos maisons et nos champs.
Défendons le pays de nos pères, (bis)
Il faut vaincre ou mourir bravement. (bis)

Mes amis si Dieu veut que je meure,
Retirez cet anneau de mon doigt.
Portez-le à ma Mie qui me pleure, (bis)
Dites-lui: « cette bague est pour toi ! ». (bis)

- L'Echo du sapeur parachutiste

Sapeur parachutiste tu progresses loin là-bas,
En avant toujours prêt au combat,
En terres ennemies déjouant pièges et mines
Pour toujours le courage t'anime.

(Refrain)
Des rizières de l'Asie
Aux sables d'Arabie,
Partout, partout on salue notre ardeur,
Des hauteurs des Balkans
Aux vallées du Liban
Sapeur, Sapeur suis et Para demeure.

Parcourant le désert du Tchad
À l'immense horizon
Enthousiaste à remplir la mission,
Sur la terre africaine, sur la piste minée
La patience est ta fidèle alliée.

Tourné vers l'avenir, fidèle à ton glorieux passé,
Ton Drapeau fait toute ta fierté,
Germersheim, Indochine, Hommage à tes Anciens,
Derrière eux tu poursuis le chemin.

==== Decorations ====
The regimental colors are decorated with:

- Croix de Guerre 1939-1945 with 1 star of vermeil (to quote the order by the Army OG 1148 of September 15, 1945),
- Croix de la Valeur militaire with:
  - 2 palms ( for service in Lebanon as part of the United Nations Interim Force in Lebanon in 1980 and 1982)
  - 1 palm ( for service in Afghanistan as part of the International Security Assistance Force on May 21, 2012
  - 1 star of vermeil ( for service in Mali as part of the corps of Operation Serval in September 2014 )
- Fourragère with colors of la Croix de la Valeur militaire on April 16, 2012; the first unit to be decorated with such honors.
- French Medal of Honor for Courage and Commitment - échelon bronze, 1952, for search and rescue operations during the Natural disaster in the South-West of France.

The Fanions of the 1st, 2nd and 3rd combat companies are decorated with:

- Croix de guerre des théâtres d'opérations extérieures with 1 palm for the '2nd' combat company.
- Croix de guerre des théâtres d'opérations extérieures with 1 vermeil star for the '1st' combat company.
- Croix de guerre des théâtres d'opérations extérieures with 1 vermeil star for the '3rd' combat company.
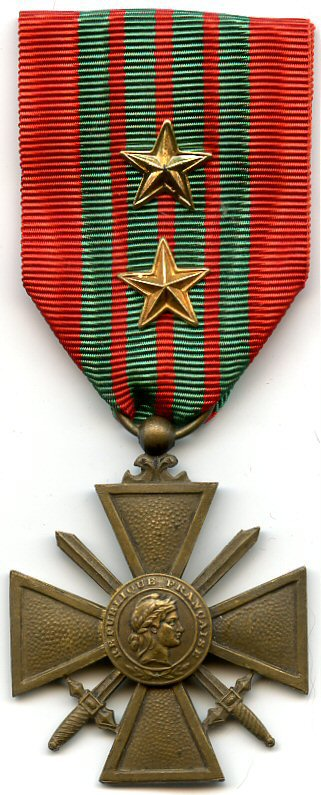
Croix de Guerre 1939–1945 with 1 star vermeil

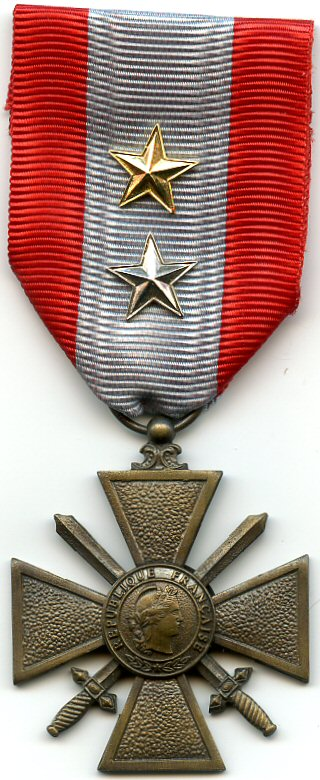
Croix de Guerre TOE for the 1st, 2nd and 3rd combat companies

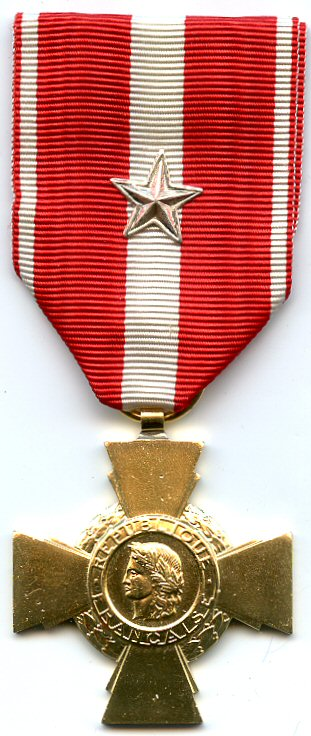
Croix de la Valeur militaire

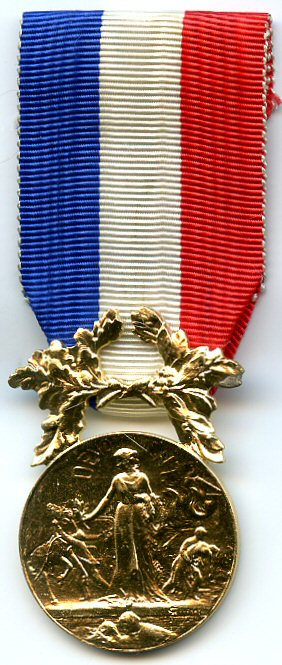
Honour medal for courage and devotion

== Battalion and Regimental Commanders since 1963 ==
17^{e} R.G.A.P
17th Parachute Airborne Regiment

- 1963 - 1963: Chef de Bataillon Fanget
- 1963 - 1966: Lt-Colonel Pantalacci
- 1966 - 1968: Lt-Colonel Campet
- 1969 - 1970: Lt-Colonel Marinelli
- 1970 - 1971: Lt-Colonel Du Boucher
- 1974 - 1976: Lt-Colonel Martin
- 1976 - 1978: Lt-Colonel Le Bris

17^{e} R.G.P
17th Parachute Engineer Regiment

- 1978 - 1980 Colonel Michel Roquejeoffre
- 1980 - 1982 Colonel Ferrand
- 1982 - 1984 Colonel Christian Quesnot
- 1984 - 1986 Colonel Fauchier
- 1986 - 1988 Colonel Magon de la Ville Huchet
- 1988 - 1990 Colonel Ranson
- 1990 - 1992 Colonel Peyrefitte
- 1992 - 1994 Colonel Dupré
- 1994 - 1996 Colonel Thierry Cambournac
- 1996 - 1998 Colonel Pecchioli
- 1998 - 2000 Colonel Szwed
- 2000 - 2002 Colonel Berger
- 2002 - 2004 Colonel Dominguez
- 2004 - 2006 Colonel Kuntz
- 2006 - 2008 Colonel Esparsa
- 2008 - 2010 Colonel Jouslin de Noray
- 2010 - 2012 Colonel Poitou
- 2012 - 2014 Colonel Vales
- 2014 -201x) Colonel Thierry Tricand de la Goutte

== See also ==
- List of French paratrooper units
- 35th Parachute Artillery Regiment
- 1st Parachute Hussard Regiment

== Sources ==
- Amicale (friends) of the 17th Parachute Engineer Regiment, www.amicale-17rgp.fr.
