= 8th Marine Infantry Parachute Regiment =

- 8^{e} Régiment de Parachutistes d'Infanterie de Marine
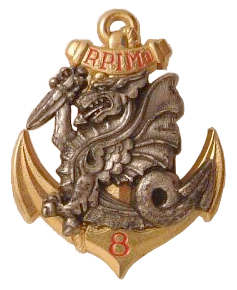
- Active: 28 February 1951 – present (same unit, different designations) 8^{e} B.P.Colonial 1951; 8^{e} G.C.P 1952; 8^{e} B.P.Choc 1953; 8^{e} R.P.C 1956–1958; 8^{e} R.P.I.Ma 1958 – present
- Country: France
- Branch: Marine Troops; French Army
- Type: Airborne regiment
- Role: Air assault Close-quarters combat Direct action Parachuting; Reconnaissance; Urban warfare Long-range penetration
- Size: 1200 men and women
- Part of: 11th Parachute Brigade; 3rd Division
- Garrison/HQ: Castres, France
- Motto: Volontaire (Volunteer)
- Colors: Blue and red
- Anniversaries: Saint-Michel Day
- Engagements: First Indochina War; Battle of Hòa Bình; Battle of Dien Bien Phu; Algerian War; Lebanese Civil War 1975–1990: United Nations Interim Force in Lebanon; Multinational Force 1982–1984; Gulf War; War on terror (2001–present): War in Afghanistan (2001–present)

Commanders
- Current commander: Philippe du Chaxel
- Notable commanders: Guy Le Borgne; Pierre Tourret; François Cann

Insignia
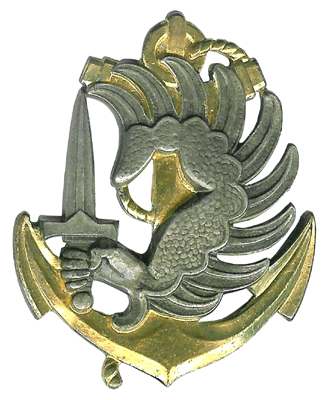
- Insignia of the 8th Marine Infantry Parachute Regiment
- Abbreviation: 8^{e} RPIMa

The 8th Marine Infantry Parachute Regiment (French: 8^{e} Régiment de Parachutistes d'Infanterie de Marine, 8^{e} RPIMa) is an airborne regiment of the Troupes de Marine. The 8^{e} RPIMa was created on 28 February 1951 and the men wear the red beret. It is part of the 11th Parachute Brigade.

The regiment is garrisoned at Castres, France. Current missions of the 8^{e} RPIMa revolve around peacekeeping and assistance to world populations, and in that regard at the service and disposition of NATO or the United Nations directives. The regiment intervenes around the world protecting French interests in and not limited to: Chad, Lebanon, New Caledonia, Kuwait, Rwanda, Gabon, Kurdistan, Democratic Republic of Congo, Central African Republic, Congo-Brazzaville, RDC, ex-Yugoslavia, Cambodia, Macedonia, Kosovo, Ivory Coast, and Afghanistan. Overseas, the regiment is engaged in operations defending French interests, or countries that are in liaison with France in security missions. In Europe, the regiment is engaged in defending the national French territory at the corps of the terrestrial action force. This regiment can be rapidly deployed anywhere in the world. The regiment parts various Commando Parachute Groups, a group of French elite units. Parachute training is conducted at the École des troupes aéroportées (ETAP) in Pau.

== Creation and different nominations since 1951 ==
- 28 February 1951: creation of the 8th Colonial Parachute Battalion, 8^{e} BPC.
- 12 September 1952: became the 8th Commando Parachute Groupment, 8^{e} GCP.
- 1 August 1953: became the 8th Parachute Choc Battalion, 8^{e} BPC.
- 31 May 1954: dissolution of the 8th Parachute Choc Battalion, 8^{e} BPC.
- 1 May 1956: creation of the 8th Colonial Parachute Regiment 8^{e} RCP at the corps of the 25th Parachute Division 25^{e} DP.
- 1 December 1958: became 8th Marine Infantry Parachute Regiment, 8^{e} RPIMa.

== Campaigns ==
Campaign
8th Colonial Parachute Battalion (1951–1954)

- 1951–1954: Indochina War

Campaign Participation Engagement
8th Colonial Parachute Regiment
(1956–1958)

- 1956–1961: Algerian War

Campaign Participation Engagement
8th Marine Infantry Parachute Regiment (1958–present)

- 1970: Chad
- 1978–1979: Lebanon, UNIFIL
- 1979: Chad, Opération Tacaud
- 1980: New Hebrides with Royal Marines
- 1982: Lebanon, UNIFIL
- 1983: Chad, Operation Manta
- 1982–1983: Lebanon, Multinational Force in Lebanon
- 1984: Chad
- 1986: New Caledonia
- 1986: Chad, Opération Épervier
- 1988: New Caledonia
- 1989: Chad, Opération Épervier
- 1990: Gabon, Opération Requin
- 1991: Kuwait
- 1991: Kurdistan
- 1991–1992: Zaire
- 1992: Cambodia
- 1993: Central African Republic, RCA
- 1993–1995: Sarajevo
- 1995: Tahiti
- 1996–1997: RCA
- 1996: Sarajevo
- 1997: DRC
- 1997: Congo-Brazzaville
- 1998: Macedonia
- 1999: Kosovo
- 2002: Kosovo
- 2002: Ivory Coast, Opération Licorne
- 2003–2005: Kosovo
- 2006–2007: DRC
- 2008–2009: Afghanistan
- 2010–2011: Kosovo with 1^{er} RHP and 17^{e} RGP
- 2013–2014: RCA

The unit was created on 28 February 1951, in Hanoi as the "8th Colonial Parachute Battalion", as a part of the French union forces. Present since 1951 and to 1954, the "8th Colonial Parachute Battalion" fought at Lai-Chau, Hòa Bình, Langson and Dien Bien Phu heavily superiorly outnumbered. The Battalion was cited at the orders of the armed forces and mentioned in dispatches four times for acts of valor. The quasi totality of the battalion disappeared and was subsequently dissolved on 19 May 1954, after the Battle of Dien Bien Phu.

The unit was recreated as the "8th Colonial Parachute Regiment" on 1 May 1956. The regiment participated in operations against the Algerian National Liberation Front (FLN), most notably at El Kiffene, Ain El Kesseub and Tarf at the corps of the 25th Parachute Division.

=== 8th Marine Infantry Parachute Regiment (1958 – present) ===
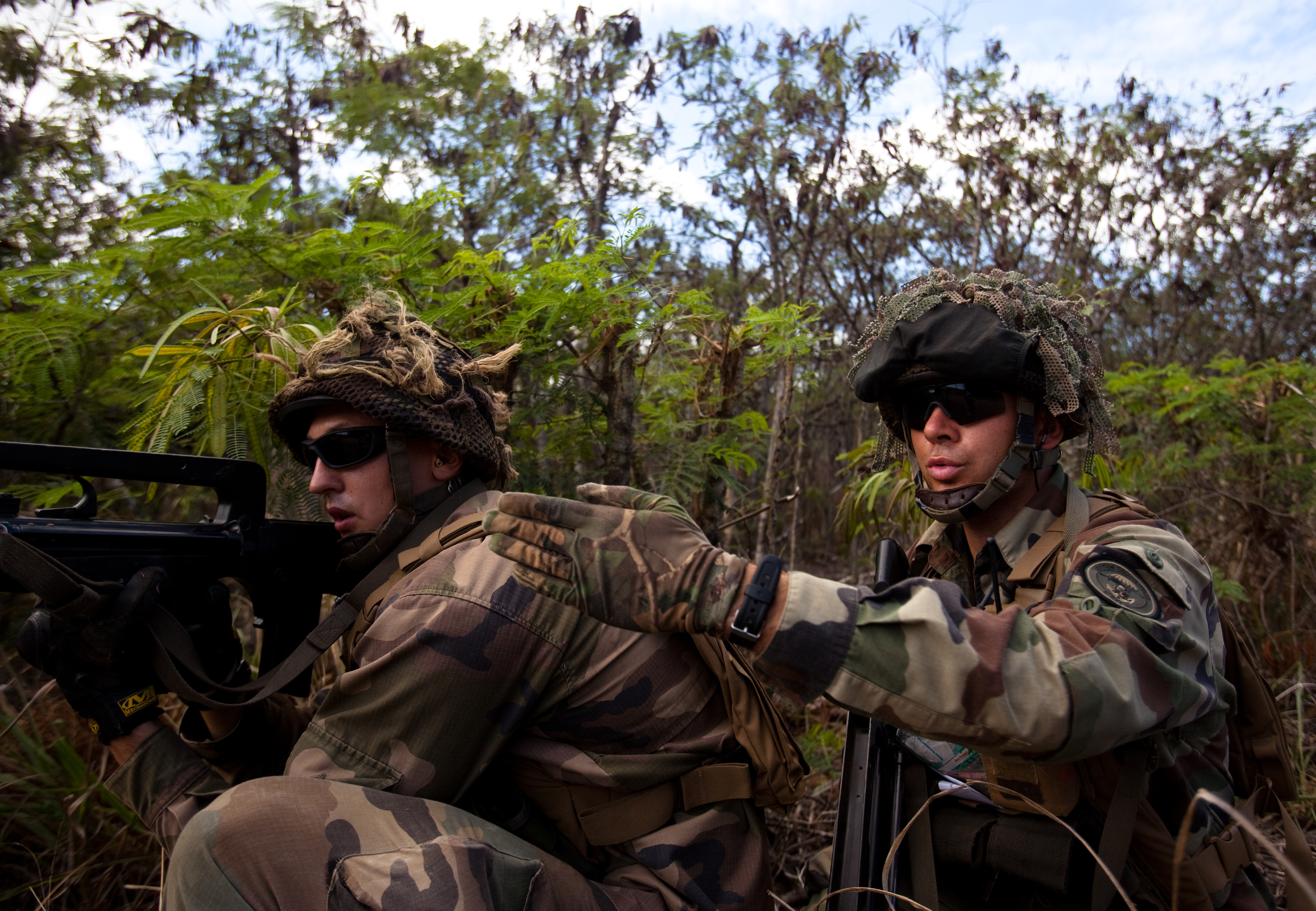
French marines with the 8th Marine Airborne Light Infantry Regiment scout ahead of a patrol Oct. 23, 2012, at Marine Corps Training Area Bellows, Hawaii, during exercise Amercal 2012.

The regiment relocated to the town of Nancy, Metropolitan France, in 1961, to form part of the 11th Light Intervention Division. The regimental headquarters moved to Castres in 1963.

The regiment took part in various peacekeeping missions in Lebanon on numerous yearly designated occasions within the UNIFIL first then joined the Multinational Force in Lebanon.

The regiment has been present around the world in Lebanon, Chad, Central Africa, Gabon and many others while mainly participating in humanitarian and peacekeeping missions.

The regiment has been spearheading combat, combat support, peacekeeping and multipurposed facade mission operations throughout the globe with the ongoing war on terror, mainly on all exterior theatres of operations where the French Armed Forces are engaged in along the five continents and oceanic surroundings. The regiment served with the NATO ISAF in Afghanistan. In a fierce battle on 18–19 August 2008, ten French soldiers were killed and 21 wounded making it the largest loss of French troops in battle in many years.

== Composition ==
The regiment is composed of around 1200 marine infantry parachute personnel in eight combat companies:

- Compagnie de commandement et de logistique (CCL) – Command and logistics company
- Compagnie d'éclairage et d'appui (CEA) – Reconnaissance and support company
- 1^{re} Compagnie de combat – 1st Combat company
- 2^{e} Compagnie de combat – 2nd Combat company
- 3^{e} Compagnie de combat – 3rd Combat company
- 4^{e} Compagnie de combat – 4th Combat company
- Compagnie de réserve opérationnelle (CRO) – Operational reserve company

== Traditions ==
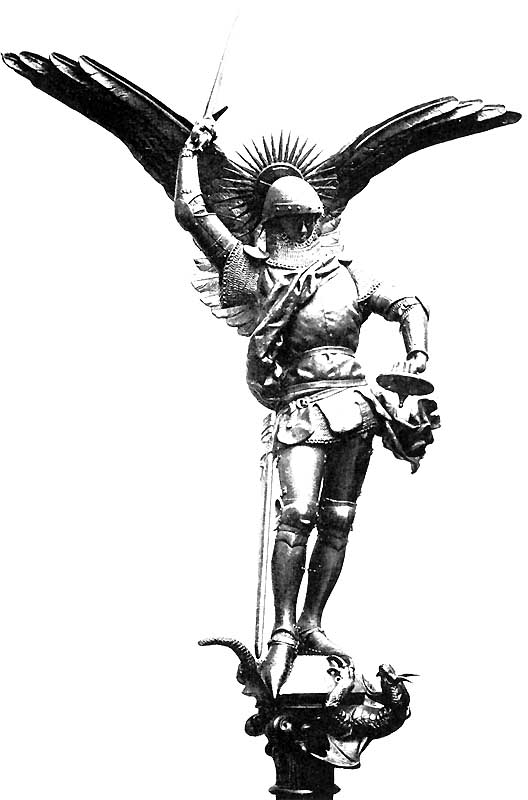
The Archangel Michael featured in Mont Saint-Michel and the Insignia of the 9th Parachute Chasseur Regiment.

French army metropolitan and marine paratroopers forming the 11th Parachute Brigade wear the Red Beret.

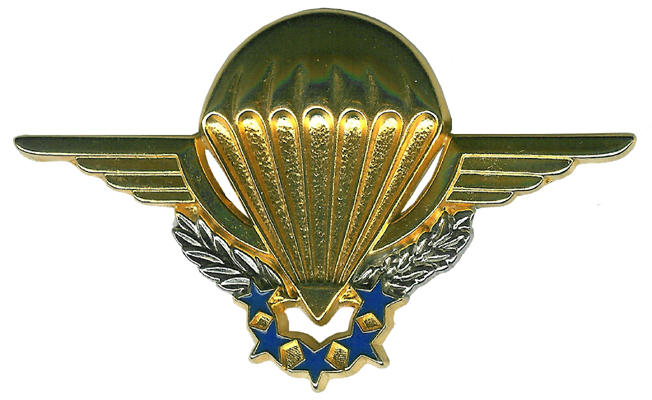
French Commando Parachute Group Brevet of Chuteur Opérationnel

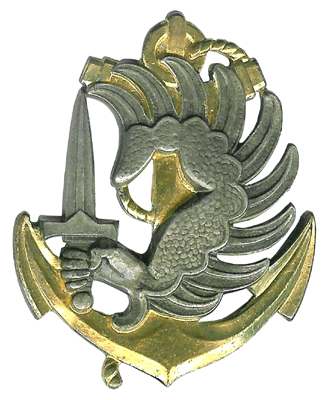
Anchored Winged Armed Dextrochere of French Army Marine Infantry Paratroopers

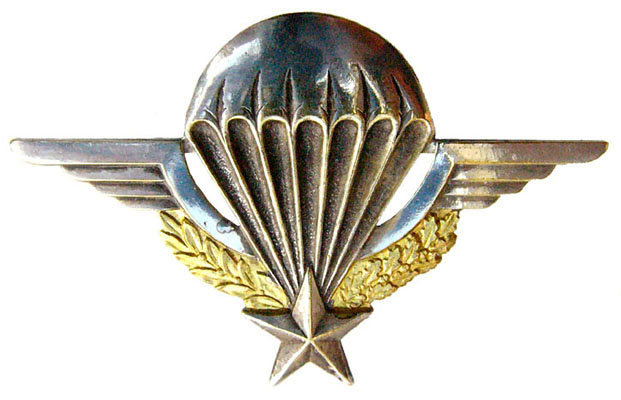
French Army Parachute Brevet.

The Archangel Saint Michael, patron of the French paratroopers is celebrated on 29 September.

The prière du Para (Prayer of the Paratrooper) was written by André Zirnheld in 1938.

=== Insignias ===
Just like the paratrooper Brevet of the French Army; the Insignia of French Paratroopers was created in 1946. The French Army Insignia of metropolitan Paratroopers represents a closed "winged armed dextrochere", meaning a "right winged arm" armed with a sword pointing upwards. The Insignia makes reference to the Patron of Paratroopers. In fact, the Insignia represents "the right Arm of Saint Michael", the Archangel which according to Liturgy is the "Armed Arm of God". This Insignia is the symbol of righteous combat and fidelity to superior missions. The French Army Insignia of Marine Infantry Paratroopers is backgrounded by a Marine Anchor.

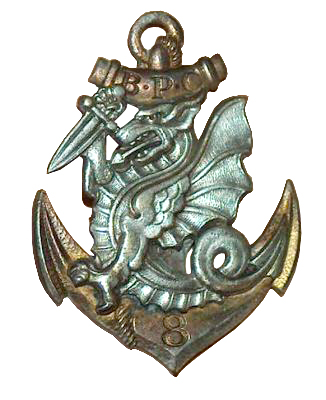
Right chest insignia of the 8^{e} B.P.C

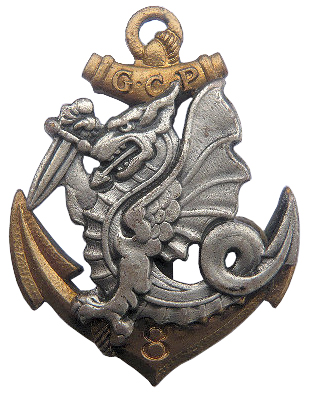
Right chest insignia of the 8^{e} G.C.P

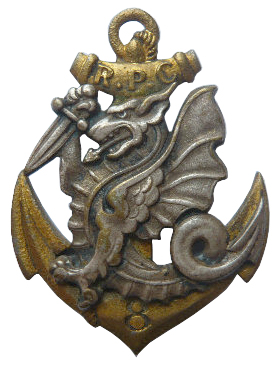
Right chest insignia of the 8^{e} R.P.C

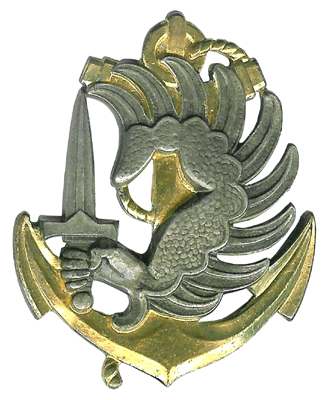
Beret insignia of the Marine Parachute Units

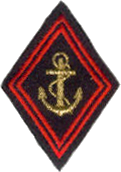
Left arm insignia of the Troupes de Marine

=== Regimental Colors ===
Regimental Colors of the 8th Marine Infantry Parachute Regiment.

Since creation, the regiment has endured the loss of 19 Officers, 91 Sous-Officiers and 437 paratroopers of the 8^{e} RPIMa.

=== Decorations ===
The regimental colors are decorated with:

- Croix de guerre des théâtres d'opérations extérieures with :
  - 4 palms
- Croix de la Valeur militaire with :
  - 1 palm (21 May 2012 for service in Afghanistan).
  - 1 palm (31 August 2012 for service in Lebanon – Regularization of the citation at the orders of the armed forces received in 1979).
  - 1 palm (1 October 2013 for service in Afghanistan).
- Fourragère with colors of la Croix de la Valeur militaire.

The regiment bears wearing 3 Fourragère:

- Fourragère bearing the colors of the Médaille militaire.
- Fourragère bearing the colors of the Croix de guerre des théâtres d'opérations extérieures.
- Fourragère bearing the colors of the Croix de la Valeur militaire.
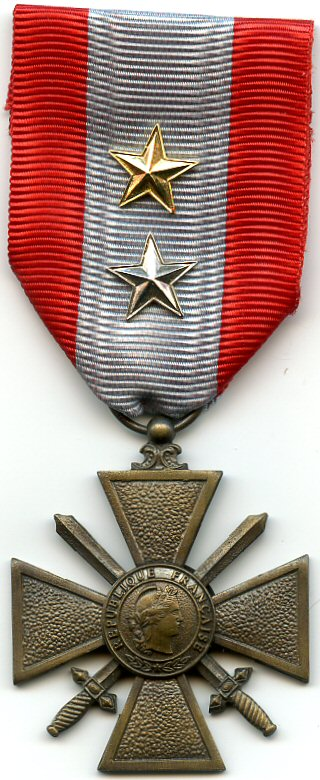
Croix de Guerre TOE

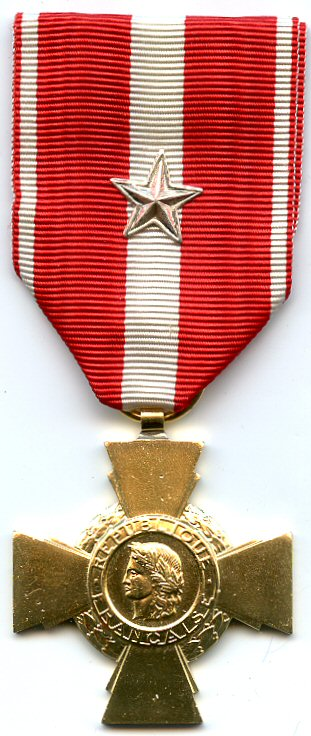
Croix de la Valeur militaire

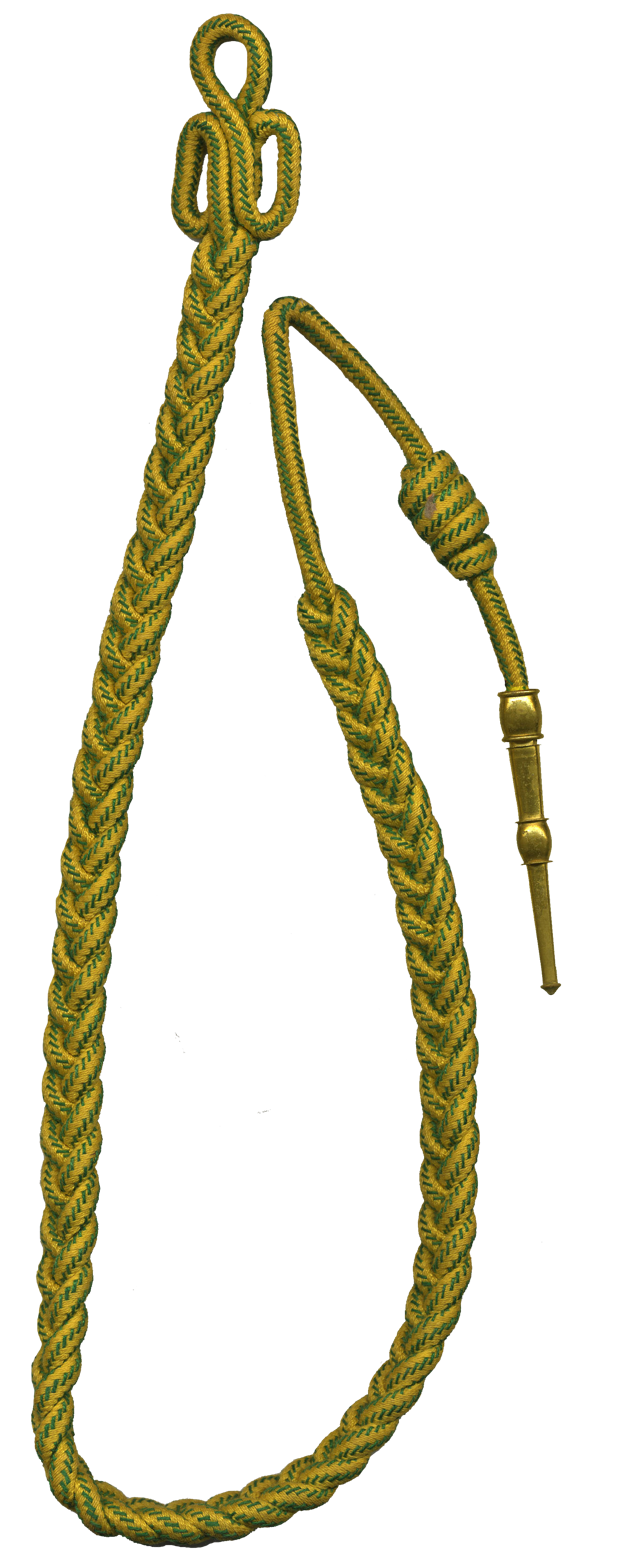
Fourragère aux couleurs de la Médaille militaire

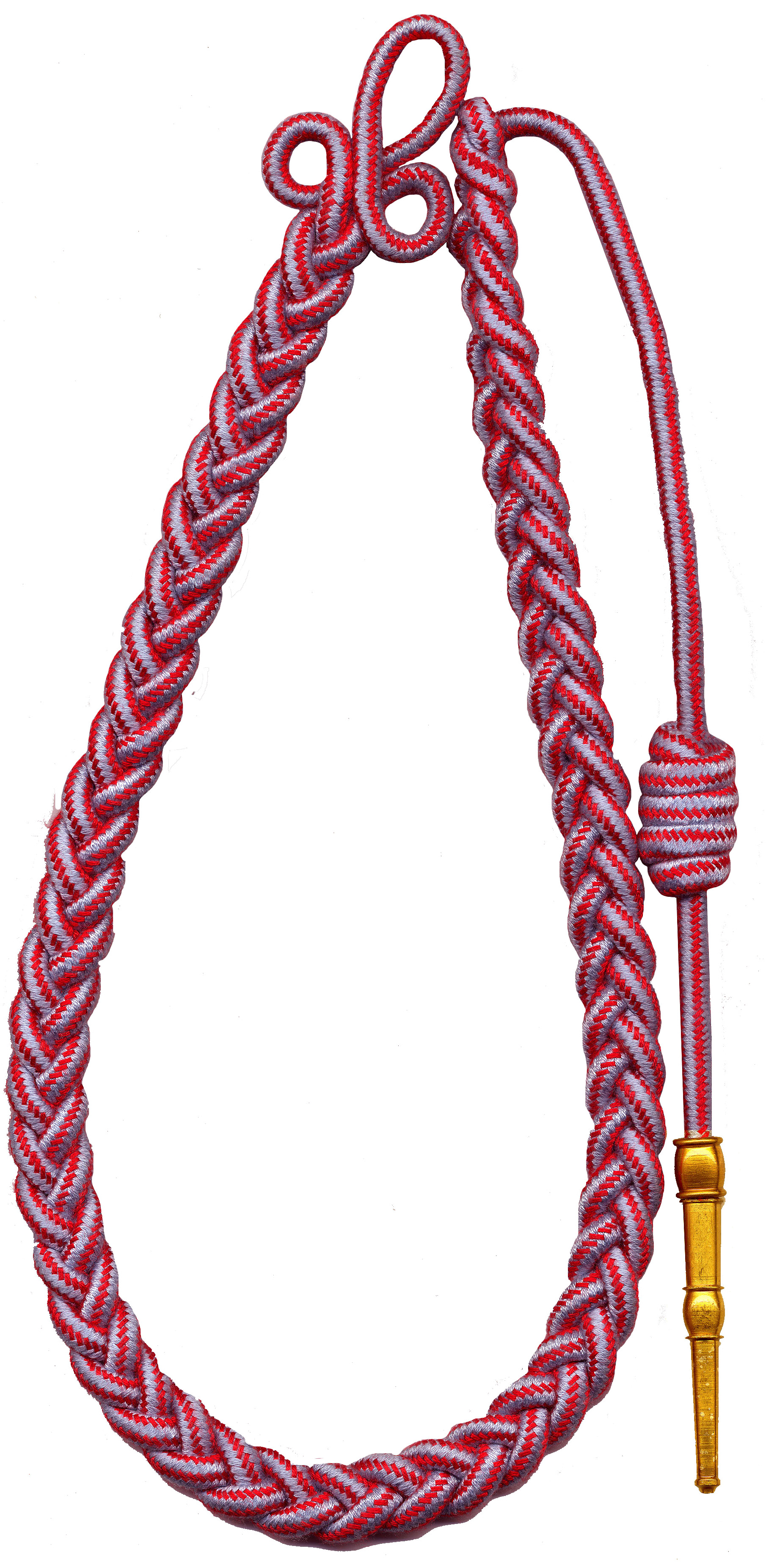
Fourragère aux couleurs de la Croix de guerre des théâtres d'opérations extérieures

=== Honors ===
==== Battle honors ====
- INDOCHINE 1951–1954
- AFN 1952–1962

== Regimental Commanders ==
8th Colonial Parachute Battalion
8th Commando Parachute Groupment
8th Parachute Choc Battalion

- Captain Gautier (1951–1952)
- Captain Guy Le Borgne (1952–1953)
- Captain Pierre Tourret (1953–1954)
- Lieutenant Colonel Kohler (1954–1955)
- 8th Colonial Parachute Regiment
- Colonel Louis Fourcade (1956–1958)

8th Marine Infantry Parachute Regiment, 8^{e} RPIMa

- Lieutenant Colonel Hubert de Seguins-Pazzis (1958–1960)
- Lieutenant Colonel Albert Lenoir (1960–1961)
- Lieutenant Colonel Kohler (1961–1963)
- Lieutenant Colonel Desfarges (1963–1965)
- Lieutenant Colonel Drouin (1965–1967)
- Lieutenant Colonel Mourier (1967–1969)
- Lieutenant Colonel Guilleminot (1969–1971)
- Lieutenant Colonel Bellamy (1971–1973)
- Lieutenant Colonel Dominique (1973–1975)
- Colonel Maurice Schmitt (1975–1977)

8th Marine Infantry Parachute Regiment, 8^{e} RPIMa

- Lieutenant Colonel François Cann (1977–1979)
- Lieutenant Colonel Vidal (1979–1981)
- Lieutenant Colonel Zeisser (1981–1983)
- Lieutenant Colonel Lepage (1983–1985)
- Lieutenant Colonel Theodoly-Lannes (1985–1987)
- Colonel Lafourcade (1987–1989)
- Lieutenant Colonel Thomann (1989–1991)
- Lieutenant Colonel Elrick Irastorza (1991–1993)
- Lieutenant Colonel de Haynin de Bry (1993–1995)
- Lieutenant Colonel Reglat (1995–1997)
- Lieutenant Colonel de Braquilanges (1997–1999)
- Colonel Michel Stollsteiner (1999–2001)
- Colonel Bosser (2001–2003)
- Colonel Brousse (2003–2005)
- Colonel Guionie (2005–2007)
- Colonel Jacques Aragones (2007–2009)
- Colonel Philippe du Chaxel (2009–2011)
- Colonel Eric Chasboeuf (2011–2013)
- Colonel Tassel (2013–2015)
- Colonel Danigo (2015–2017)
- Colonel Debray (2017–2019)
- Colonel Prod'homme (2019-2021)
- Colonel Degand (2021-2023)
- Colonel de Courtivron (2023-2025)
- Colonel Lamy (2025-202.)

== Honorary Regimental Arms Celebration ==
- The regiment distinguished savoire-faire in Indochina. The regiment received 4 citations at the orders of the armed forces for acts of valor.
- In Algeria, the regiment placed out of combat 2800 militants and recuperated 1000 arms.
- In 1978 and commanded by colonel Cann, the regiment was engaged in total in Lebanon in support of the peace effort. The regiment received the 5th citation at the orders of the armed forces.
- In 1979 and commanded by captain Marchand, a company from the regiment was engaged fully in Chad.
- In 2008, the regiment endured the loss of eight 8^{e} RPIMa paratroopers fighting in Afghanistan.
- In 2013, the regiment endured the loss of two paratroopers in RCA.

== Notable members of the regiment ==
- Guy Le Borgne, regimental commander (1952–1953)
- Patrice Le Nepvou de Carfort (1952–1959)
- René de Salins (1920–2014)
- Pierre Tourret, regimental commander (1953–1954)
- François Cann, regimental commander ( 1977–1979)
- Maurice Amiot
