= Hubert de Seguins-Pazzis =

French military officer and politician (1913–1994)

Hubert Marie Jean Albert de Seguins-Pazzis d'Aubignan
- Born: 16 December 1913; Orléans, France
- Died: 19 December 1994 (aged 81); Paris, France
- Military career
- Branch: French Army
- Rank: Général de corps d'armée
- Commands: 8th Colonial Parachute Regiment; 11th Parachute Division
- Conflicts: World War II; First Indochina War; Battle of Dien Bien Phu; Algerian War
- Awards: Grand Officer of the Legion of Honour; Croix de Guerre 1939–1945; Cross for Military Valour; Silver Star

Hubert Marie Jean Albert de Seguins-Pazzis d'Aubignan (16 December 1913 – 19 December 1994), was a French military officer who fought in World War II, the First Indochina War and the Algerian War. He was one of the commanders in the Battle of Dien Bien Phu and assisted in negotiating the Évian Accords, granting Algerian independence.

== Early life ==
He was born on 16 December 1913 in Orléans into the noble Famille de Seguins. He attended school in Montauban and then secondary school at the Collège Saint-Jean-de-Béthune in Versailles and then the Ecole Sainte-Geneviève, also in Versailles.

== Military career ==
He attended the École spéciale militaire de Saint-Cyr from 1931 to 1933 and then the École de cavalerie, Saumur, graduating as a second lieutenant in 1933. He was promoted to lieutenant in 1935 and served in the 1st Battalion of mounted Dragoons.

At the beginning of World War II he commanded a squadron of mounted dragoons and earned the Legion of Honour. After the Fall of France he was transferred as an instructor to Saint-Cyr in October 1940 and was promoted to Captain in 1941. In 1943, he escaped from Vichy France via Spain and joined the Free French Forces fr:5e régiment de chasseurs d'Afrique in Algiers. He was appointed commander of the regiment's 2nd Tank Squadron and led the unit from the landing in Provence to the fighting on the German border. In January 1945, he entered the Staff College.

He requested a transfer to the colonial infantry, and was assigned to the staff of General Leclerc in French Indochina. He was then appointed economic advisor to the commissioner of the republic in Laos in April 1946. He was appointed to the 2nd Colonial Parachute Commando Demi-brigade in 1948. He was promoted to commandant in 1949 and seconded to the permanent staff of the president of the council of ministers. From 1949 to late 1953, he was commander of the 4th Colonial Parachute Commando Battalion in Senegal.

At the beginning of 1954, he served as chief of staff to Colonel Pierre Langlais, commander of Groupement Aéroporté 2 (GAP 2), (Airborne Group 2). When Langlais assumed command of the central sector at Dien Bien Phu on 13 March 1954, he assumed command of GAP 2. On 16 April he received a battlefield promotion from major to lieutenant colonel. On 23 April he became chief of staff to Colonel Christian de Castries, the nominal commander at Dien Bien Phu. He was captured when the garrison at Dien Bien Phu was overrun. He survived captivity and was released several months later.

After recovering from captivity he was assigned to the NATO college and then to the office of the secretary of state for Tunisian and Moroccan Affairs, before attending the École supérieure de guerre from 1955 to 1958.

He was promoted to colonel and from 1958 to 1960 commanded the 8th Colonial Parachute Regiment in French Algeria. Louis Joxe, Minister of State in charge of Algerian affairs appointed him to assist in the negotiations at Évian-les-Bains in early 1962 with representatives of the Provisional Government of the Algerian Republic which led to the Évian Accords, granting Algerian independence.

From 1963 to 1967, he served as deputy commander of the École supérieure de guerre. In 1964 he was promoted to brigadier general.

In 1967, he took command of the 11th Parachute Division. He was promoted to major general in December 1968. He served as commander of the French Forces in the Indian Ocean at Madagascar from 1969 to 1971. In 1971, with the rank of lieutenant general, he was appointed French representative to NATO and head of the French military mission to the Military Committee of the North Atlantic Council. He was transferred to the reserves in December 1974.

== Personal life and family ==
He married Marie-Claire-Josèphe-Marcelle-Marguerite Renom de La Baume (31 July 1933 – 1 August 2008) on 17 December 1956.

== Later life and death ==
He died in Paris on 19 December 1994. His funeral was held at Les Invalides on 22 December. He was buried in Argenvières.

== Honors and awards ==
His awards and decorations include: Grand Officer of the Legion of Honour, Croix de Guerre 1939–1945, Cross for Military Valour and Silver Star.
