= Maurice Amiot =

French soldier

- Born: 19 March 1932; Vaire-le-Grand, France
- Died: 2 April 1961 (aged 29); Aurès Mountains, Algeria
- Military career
- Allegiance: France
- Branch: French Army
- Service years: 1947–1961
- Rank: Adjudant
- Unit: 14e RCP
- Conflicts: First Indochina War; Algerian War
- Awards: Knight of Légion d'honneur (posthumous); Médaille militaire Croix de guerre des TOE

Maurice Amiot (French: [mɔʁis amjo]; 19 March 1932 – 2 April 1961) was a French soldier who fought in the First Indochina War and the Algerian War. He was killed in action leading his platoon in the Aurès Mountains during the Algerian War.

== Biography ==
Maurice Amiot was born on 19 March 1932 in Vaire-le-Grand, Doubs department. He joined the French Army at 17 and was posted with the 1st Choc Parachute Battalion at 18. He attracted the notice of his superiors and was sent to a training platoon, attaining the rank of corporal. In July 1951, he volunteered for service in Indochina.

In Indochina, Amiot spent six months instructing units of the Vietnamese National Army, before being posted to the 8th Colonial Parachute Battalion in February 1952. Eight months later, his leadership qualities had earned him promotion to caporal-chef. He also received his first citation as a group leader at the Battle of Uong-Phu. In October 1953, Amiot returned to France and was assigned to the 35th Algerian Tirailleur Battalion at Toulouse, one of two Algerian Tirailleur battalions who formed the 14th Choc Parachute Infantry Regiment.

In July 1954, Amiot volunteered for the Blizzard Battalion destined for Tunisia and on 1 November he was promoted to sergeant. Returning to France, he became a parachute instructor in 1956. The Algerian War had now begun in earnest; during his first tour Amiot was promoted to sergent-chef and received several citations. On 2 July 1959, he received the Médaille militaire for outstanding service and on 1 August, he became a career non-commissioned officer.

During his second tourm he received three citations, including one at army level. On 2 April 1961, he took part in an operation in the Aurès Mountains at the head of his section of the 2nd Company, 14e Parachute Chasseur Regiment (14e RCP) and was killed in action. Posthumously he was made Knight of the Légion d’honneur and became the patron of the 95th class of non-commissioned officers of the Saint Maixent School. (now the National Active Non-Commissioned Officers School (France) or École Nationale des Sous-Officiers d’Actives (ENSOA))

== Decorations ==
- Knight of Légion d'honneur (posthumous)
- Médaille militaire
- Croix de guerre des théâtres d'opérations extérieures with a bronze star
- Croix de la Valeur Militaire (six citations)
- Colonial Medal
- Médaille commémorative des opérations en Algérie
