= Guy Le Borgne =

French painter

- Born: 6 January 1920; Rennes, France
- Died: 12 December 2007 (aged 87); Paris, France
- Military career
- Allegiance: France
- Branch: French Army/Marine Troops
- Service years: 1940–1980
- Rank: Général de corps d'armée
- Nickname: Guy Le Zachmeur (Resistance alias)
- Commands: 8e GCP; 3e RPIMa; 11th Parachute Division
- Conflicts: World War II; *Operation Amherst; First Indochina War; Algerian War
- Awards: Grand Officer of the Légion d'honneur Grand Cross of the Ordre national du Mérite; Croix de guerre 1939-1945; Military Cross (UK)
- Other work: President of the Confédération nationale des associations parachutistes

Guy Le Borgne (6 January 1920 – 12 December 2007) was a French Army general that fought in World War II, First Indochina War and Algerian War. He commanded several paratroop units during his career and was military governor of Lyon.

== Biography ==
He graduated from Saint-Cyr Military Academy as part of the 1939-1940 "Franco-British Friendship" promotion. After the Allied defeat in the Battle of France, he escaped to North Africa and made his way to Great Britain to join General de Gaulle's Free French Forces.

Became part of a Jedburgh team, a three men team consisting of an American, British and a Frenchman. Le Borgne's team no. 45, code named FRANCIS, was dropped over Finistère, Brittany in July 1944, to assist the French Resistance. His British teammate, Major Colin Ogden Smith, was killed in a firefight with German troops on 29 July 1944. After the Jedburgh mission he joined one of two French Special Air Service units with which he took part in two operations behind German lines in the Ardennes and the Netherlands.

After the war, he joined a parachute regiment and served in Indochina where he commanded the 8th Parachute Commando Group between 1952 and 1953. During the Algerian War he commanded the 3rd Marine Infantry Parachute Regiment from 1961 to 1962, leading it during the Bizerte crisis and keeping it loyal to de Gaulle during the 1961 Algiers Putsch. After the war Guy Le Borgne commanded the 11th Parachute Division from 1973 to 1975 and finished his career as military governor of Lyon from 1976 to 1980 with the grade of général de corps d'armée.

After he retired he was elected president of the Confédération nationale des associations parachutistes in 1980 and becoming member of the honorary committee of the Union Nationale des Parachutistes in 1988. Guy Le Borgne also painted under the pseudonyme of Guy Le Zachmeur, his resistance alias from World War II. He died on 12 December 2007.

== Decorations and honours ==
- Grand Officer of the Légion d'honneur
- Grand Cross of the Ordre national du Mérite
- Croix de guerre 1939-1945
- Médaille de la Résistance
- Military Cross (UK)

In 1996, he was given the title of Official Painter of the French Air and Space Force.
