= Pierre Tourret =

- Born: 30 December 1919
- Died: December 1991 (aged 71–72)
- Military career
- Allegiance: France
- Branch: French Army/Marine Troops
- Service years: 1939–1964
- Rank: Lieutenant Colonel
- Nickname: Pierrot
- Commands: 8e BPC
- Conflicts: World War II; First Indochina War; *Battle of Dien Bien Phu; Suez Crisis; Algerian War
- Awards: Commander of the Légion d’honneur

Pierre Tourret (30 December 1919 – December 1991) was a French Army officer who served in World War II, the First Indochina War, the Suez Crisis and the Algerian War. He commanded the 8th Shock Parachute Battalion during the Battle of Dien Bien Phu.

== Life and military ==
He graduated from Saint Cyr Military Academy in 1939, took part in the fighting around Sedan in 1940 and became a prisoner of war. He was liberated in 1945 by the US Army and joined the 9th Colonial Infantry Division bound for Indochina in 1946. In 1948, he commanded a company of the 23rd Colonial Infantry Regiment in Tonkin.

For his second tour in Indochina, he commanded a battalion of the 24th Senegalese Regiment before becoming second-in-command to Marcel Bigeard in the 6th Colonial Parachute Battalion in the spring of 1951. He took part in operations around Tulé and Lang Son before he was given command of his own parachute battalion, the 8th Shock Parachute Battalion, and becoming one of the key French commanders in the Battle of Dien Bien Phu. Like many other key French commanders, he received a promotion toward the end of the battle, in his case to Major.

He took part in Operation Musketeer during the Suez Crisis in November 1956, and then transferred to the staff of General Gilles, head of the airborne forces in Algeria working with special operations. General Challe gave him command of the Parachute Commando Group of the General Reserve (Groupe de commandos paras de réserve générale, GCPRG).

In 1960 he was attached to the cabinet of Prime Minister Debré and in 1961, he was assigned to Algiers again. He was chief of staff of the 10th Parachute Division until the Algiers putsch, when he followed orders from General Challe, one of the leaders of the Putsch. He was arrested and sent to Paris, where he was immediately released. He was posted to Mauritania for two years before leaving the French Army in 1964.
