= 35th Parachute Artillery Regiment =

Military unit

- 35^{e} Régiment d'Artillerie Parachutiste
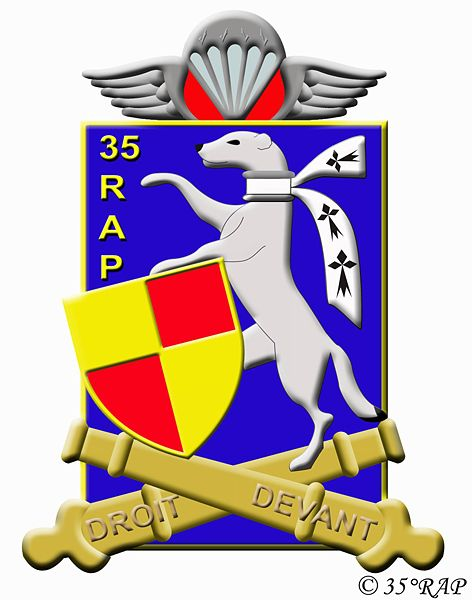
- Regimental insigne
- Active: 1873–1942; 1947–present
- Country: France
- Type: Airborne Artillery
- Size: 900 men and women
- Part of: 11th Parachute Brigade; 3rd Division
- Garrison/HQ: Tarbes, France
- Mottos: Droit Devant (Fr); Forward Straight Ahead (Eng)
- Engagements: World War I World War II; First Indochina War Algerian War; Lebanese Civil War: United Nations Interim Force in Lebanon; Multinational Force in Lebanon; Gulf War; War on terror (2001–present): War in Afghanistan (2001–present)
- Battle honours: Saint-Gond 1914; Champagne 1915; Lamalmaison 1917; Noyon 1918; Somme-Py 1918*AFN 1952–1962

Commanders
- Current commander: Colonel Marchand
- Notable commanders: Ferdinand Foch

Insignia
- Abbreviation: 35^{e} RAP

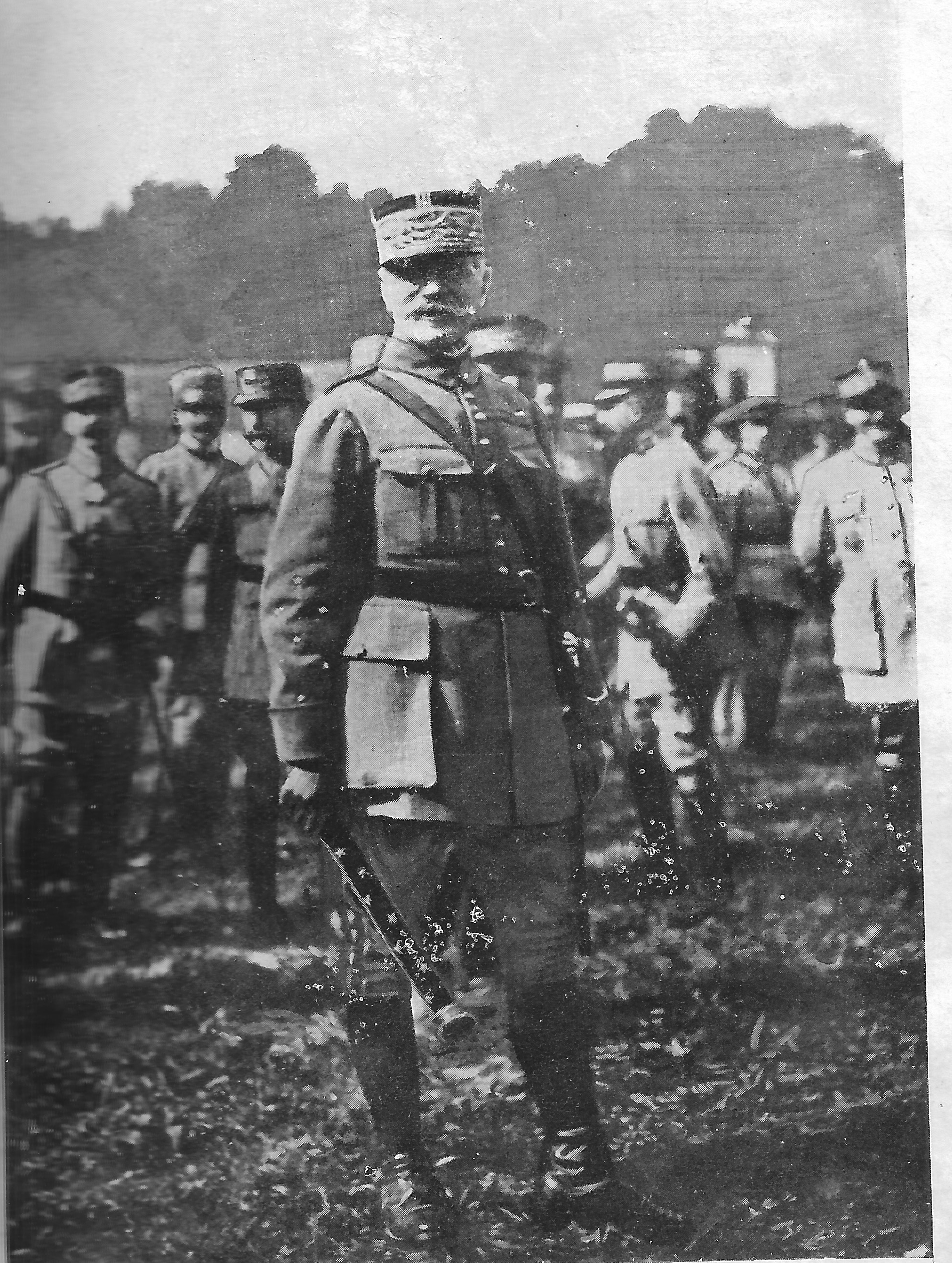
Marshal of France, Ferdinand Foch.

The 35th Parachute Artillery Regiment (French: 35^{e} Régiment d'Artillerie Parachutiste, 35^{e} RAP) is the only airborne artillery unit of the French Army forming the air artillery component of the 11th Parachute Brigade. It is based in Tarbes together with the air cavalry, the 1st Parachute Hussar Regiment.

== History ==
The 35th Artillery Regiment (French: 35^{e} Régiment d'Artillerie) was created on 7 October 1873 in Vannes and counted 9 artillery batteries equipped with 75mm cannons. The regiment was first commanded by Colonel Ferdinand Foch from 1903 to 1905, later to be Généralissime and Supreme Allied Commander on the Western Front in the later part of the First World War.

=== First World War (1914–1918) ===
The regiment fought in World War I in a series of battles, receiving four citations at the orders of the armed forces. The regiment played an active role during the First Battle of the Marne. For the 35th Artillery Regiment, combat battles included corps-à-corps with artillerymen defending their equipment straight down to the bayonets and for which the regiment was cited at the orders of the armed forces. In 1915, the regiment took part in the Offensive of Champagne and was seen appropriated with a citation at the orders of the armed forces. On March 30, 1916, the 35th Artillery Regiment 35^{e} R.A engaged in the Battle of Verdun for four weeks and then made way to the Battle of the Somme during the same year. In 1917, the regiment took part in numerous battles at Chemin des Dames including the Battle of La Malmaison on October 23, 1917. On March 31, 1918, the 35th Artillery Regiment 35^{e} R.A. was found again mounting charges around artillery equipments down to the bayonets similarly to the early worst hours of 1914. For this occasion the regiment was awarded the Fourragere with colors of the Croix de guerre 1914–1918. Some of the worst hours for the regiment were endured on May 27, following which a reorganization took place 2 month later. Accordingly, the regiment participated to the final combats of the conflict. In September, the regiment supported the assault on Souin. In October, the regiment shouldered the offensive on Somme-Py.

In 1919 and with five citations at the orders of the armed forces for acts of valor, the regiment received the privilege on February 17 to bear wearing the Fourragere with ribbon colors of the Médaille militaire.

=== Second World War (1939–1945) ===
During the Battle of France in 1940, two-thirds of the regiment was destroyed while covering the Dunkirk evacuation of Allied troops. The regiment was dissolved after Case Anton, the German invasion of Vichy France, of 1942.

At the end of World War II, the airborne artillery was reorganised on U.S. lines. The 20th Parachute Artillery Regiment was constituted from batteries of the 20th Artillery Regiment and 11th Artillery Regiment respectively. On November 1, 1946, the 20^{e} RAP was dissolved and reorganised as two new regiments designated as the 5th Parachute Artillery Regiment and 6th Parachute Artillery Regiment 6^{e} RAP. The three airborne artillery regiments included batteries equipped with different guns (wheeled cannon type 75mm, British 88mm, the U.S. cannon type 37mm anti-tank and the U.S. cannon type 75mmm) along with other anti-aircraft type equipments. The three Parachute Artillery Regiments were designated as Airborne Field Artillery Regiments (French: Régiment d'Artillerie de Campagne AéroPortée (R.A.C.A.P.).

On May 1, 1947, the 35th Parachute Light Artillery Regiment (35^{e} Régiment d'Artillerie Légère Parachutiste) (35^{e} R.A.L.P.) was created at Tarbes from the I/35^{e} R.A. The new 35th Parachute Artillery Regiment quickly became unique. The parachute artillery regiments in North Africa were dissolved in 1948 and 1949. In 1951, the regiment was equipped with several U.S. equipment type 75 M1.A1, 75 S.R (no recoil) and the 105 HM2 series.

=== Indochina War (1946–1954) ===
The regiment fought in the First Indochina War at Dien Bien Phu within Operation Castor.

=== Algerian War (1954–1962) ===
The regiment fought during the Algerian War. With the end of the Algerian War, the regiment was repatriated to France and became part of the 11th Parachute Division.

=== Lebanese Civil War (1975–1990) ===
The regiment partook in various peacekeeping missions in Lebanon on numerous yearly designated occasions, also and mainly within the ranks of the United Nations Interim Force in Lebanon, present in ground operations since 1978. From 1983 to 1984, the regiment integrated the corps of the Multinational Force in Lebanon.

=== Chad (1982–1990) ===
The regiment made an unsuccessful fire of FIM-92 Stinger during a Libyan bombardment on 10 September 19873, and on 7 July 1988 shot down a C-130 Hercules transport plane of unknown nationality in Faya-Largeau.

=== Gulf War (1990–1991) ===
The regiment was engaged in the Gulf War in 1991 part of Opération Daguet.

=== Foreign operations (1991–2001) ===
The regiment has been present around the world in Djibouti, Lebanon, Tchad, Central Africa, Gabon, Ex-Yugoslavia, Kurdistan, while also having participated in various humanitarian missions, including, Rwanda part of Opération Turquoise.

=== Twenty-first century ===
The regiment has been spearheading air artillery in combat, combat support, peacekeeping and multipurpose missions throughout the globe, mainly on all exterior theatres of operations where the French Armed Forces are engaged.

== Structure ==
- 1 Command and Logistics Air Artillery Battery
- 1 Renseignement Air Artillery Battery
- 3 Ground-to-Ground Air Artillery Batteries
- 1 Ground-to-Air Air Artillery Battery
- 1 Reserve Air Artillery Battery

== Traditions ==
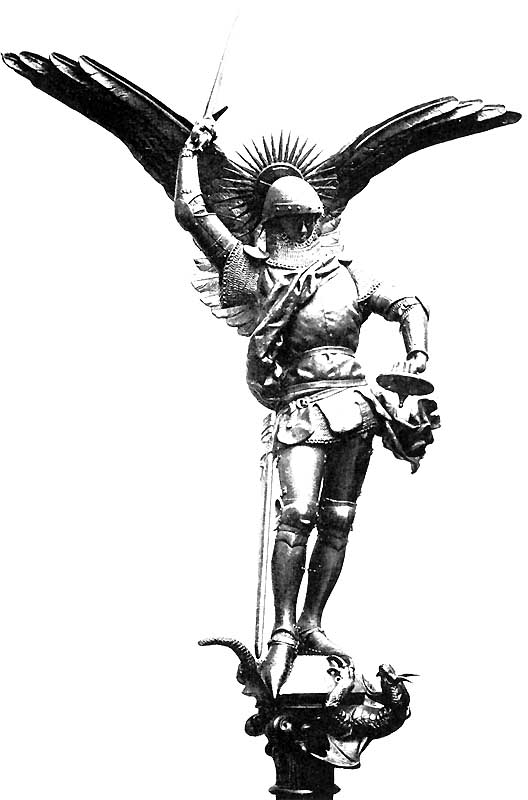
The Archangel Michael featured in Mont Saint-Michel and the Insignia of the 9th Parachute Chasseur Regiment.

Except for the Legionnaires of the 1^{er} REG, 2^{e} REG, 2^{e} REP that conserve the Green Beret; the remainder of the French army metropolitan and marine paratroopers forming the 11th Parachute Brigade wear the Red Beret.

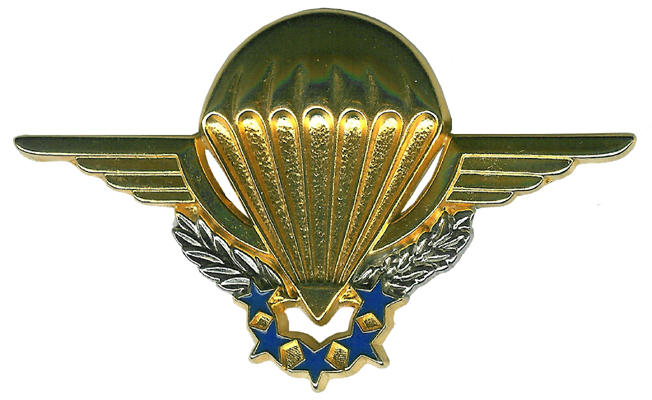
French Commando Parachute Group Brevet of Chuteur Opérationnel

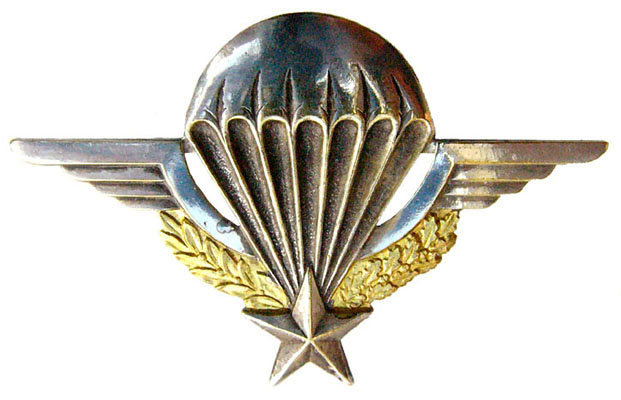
French Parachute Brevet.

The Archangel Saint Michael, patron of the French paratroopers is celebrated on September 29.

The prière du Para (Prayer of the Paratrooper) was written by André Zirnheld in 1938.

=== Insignias ===
Just like the paratrooper Brevet of the French Army; the Insignia of French Paratroopers was created in 1946. The French Army Insignia of metropolitan Paratroopers represents a closed "winged armed dextrochere", meaning a "right winged arm" armed with a sword pointing upwards. The Insignia makes reference to the Patron of Paratroopers. In fact, the Insignia represents "the right Arm of Saint Michael", the Archangel which according to Liturgy is the "Armed Arm of God". This Insignia is the symbol of righteous combat and fidelity to superior missions.

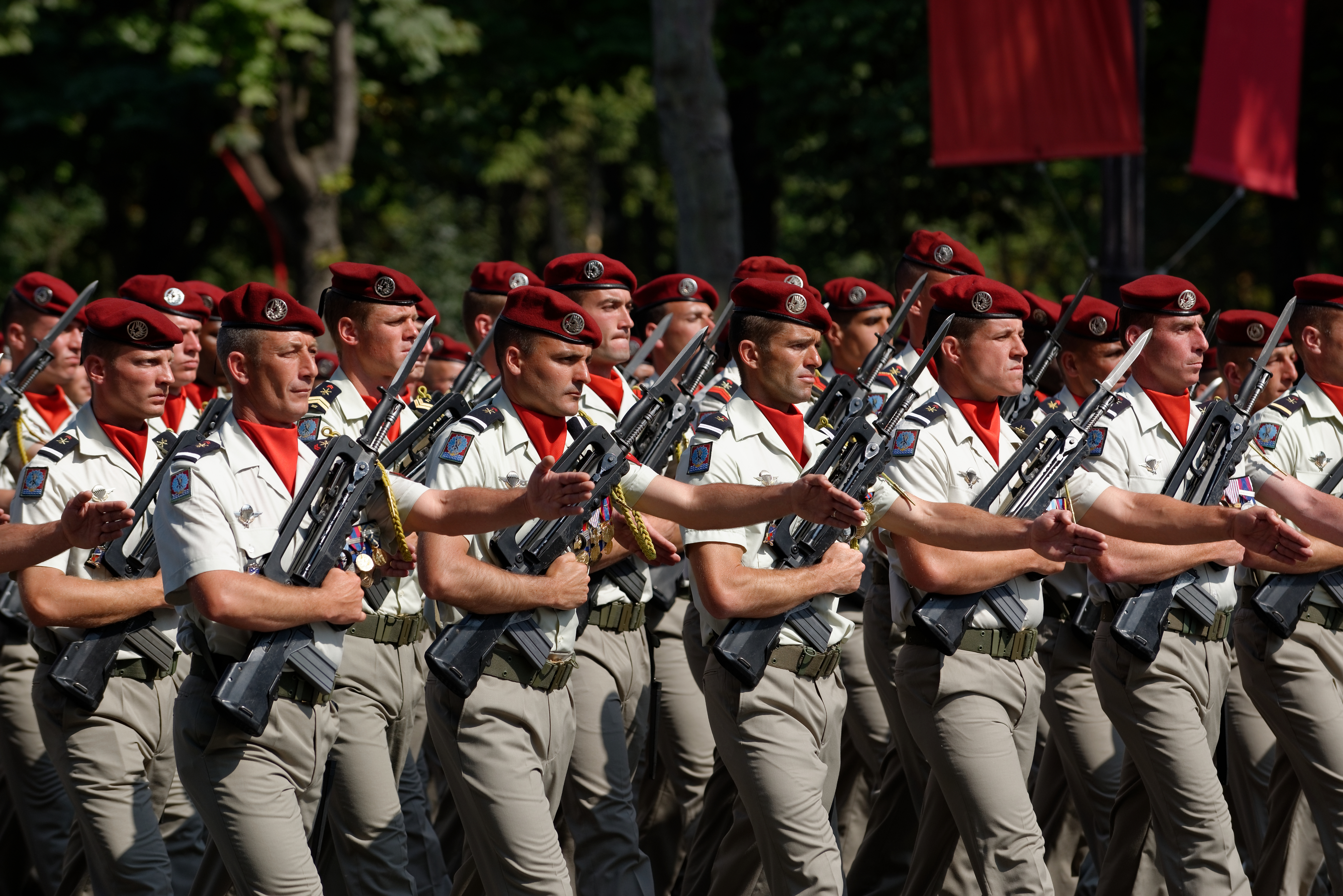
35th Parachute Artillery Regiment marching at the 2013 Bastille Day military parade, Paris

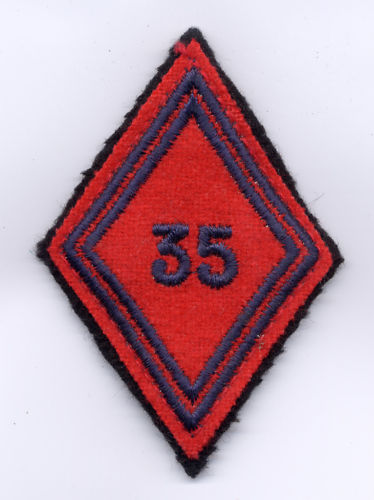
Insignia model 45 of the 35^{e} R.A.P

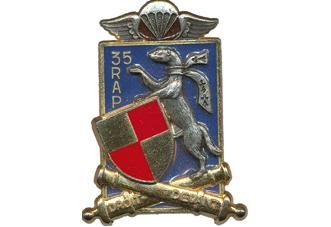
Blue Winged Rectangle with two crossed cannons reading Droit Devant topped by a red and gold shield armor

=== Decorations ===
The regimental colors are decorated with:

- Croix de guerre 1914–1918 with 4 palms cited at the orders of the armed forces.
- Cross for Military Valour with 1 palm:
  - On May 21, 2012; the regiment was cited for intervention in Afghanistan within the corps of the International Security Assistance Force (I.S.A.F).
- The regiment wears the Fourragere with ribbon colors of the Médaille militaire.
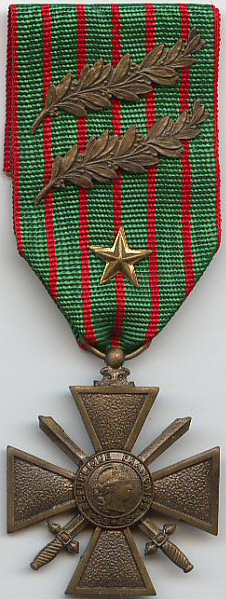
Croix de guerre 1914–1918

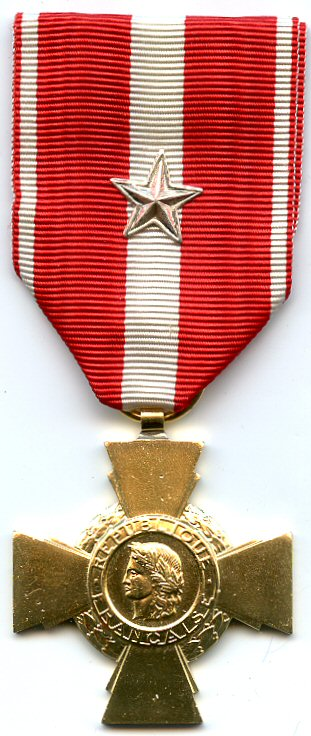
Croix de la Valeur militaire

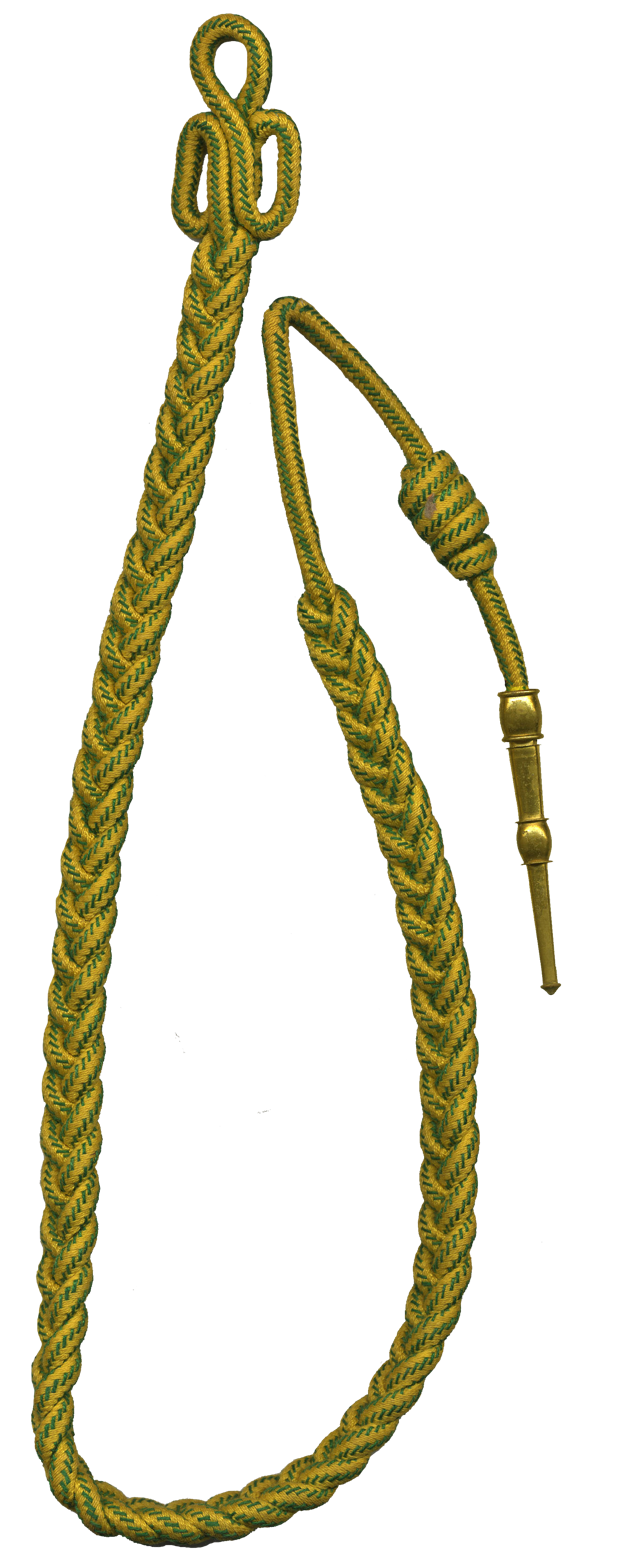
Fourragère with ribbon colors of the Médaille militaire

=== Honours ===
==== Battle Honours ====
- Saint-Gond 1914
- Champagne 1915
- La Malmaison 1917
- Noyon 1918
- Somme-Py 1918
- AFN 1952–1962

=== Regimental Commanders ===
35^{e} R.A
35th Artillery Regiment

- 1903–1905 : colonel Ferdinand Foch
- 1914 : colonel Ely
- 1917 : lieutenant-colonel Julliard

35^{e} R.A.L.P
35th Light Parachute Artillery Regiment

- 1947 : Lieutenant-colonel Mengus
- 1947–1951 : Colonel Mengus
- 1951–1955 : Colonel Bousquet
- 1955–1956 : Colonel Edel

35^{e} R.A.P
35th Parachute Artillery Regiment

- 1956–1957 : Colonel Lacabe Plasteig
- 1957–1959 : Colonel Touyeras
- 1959–1961 : Colonel Millot
- 1961–1962 : Colonel Buttner
- 1962–1963 : Colonel Buisson
- 1963–1966 : Lieutenant-colonel puis colonel Caillat
- 1966–1967 : Colonel Marty
- 1968–1969 : Lieutenant-colonel Valayer
- 1969–1971 : Colonel Faulle
- 1971–1973 : Lieutenant-colonel Creux
- 1973–1974 : Colonel Cuq
- 1975–1976: Colonel Rodriguez
- 1977–1979 : Colonel Le Guen
- 1979–1981 : Colonel Montchal
- 1981–1983 : Colonel Waymel
- 1983–1985 : Colonel Japiot
- 1985–1987 : Colonel de Gestas
- 1987–1989 : Colonel Zeller
- 1989–1991 : Colonel Perruche
- 1991–1993 : Colonel Faugère
- 1993–1995 : Colonel Coat
- 1995–1997 : Colonel L'Huillier
- 1997–1999 : Colonel Arnaud
- 1999–2001 : Colonel Léonard
- 2001–2003 : Colonel Nichini
- 2003–2005 : Colonel Nicaise
- 2005–2007 : Colonel Delion
- 2007–2009 : Colonel Pellerin
- 2009–2011 : Colonel Guilloton
- 2011–2013 : Colonel Charles
- 2013–2015 : Colonel Durieux
- 2015–2017 : Colonel Marchand
- 2017–2019 : Colonel De Crevoisier
- 2019–present : Lieutenant-Colonel Constanzo

== Gallery 35^{e} R.A.P ==
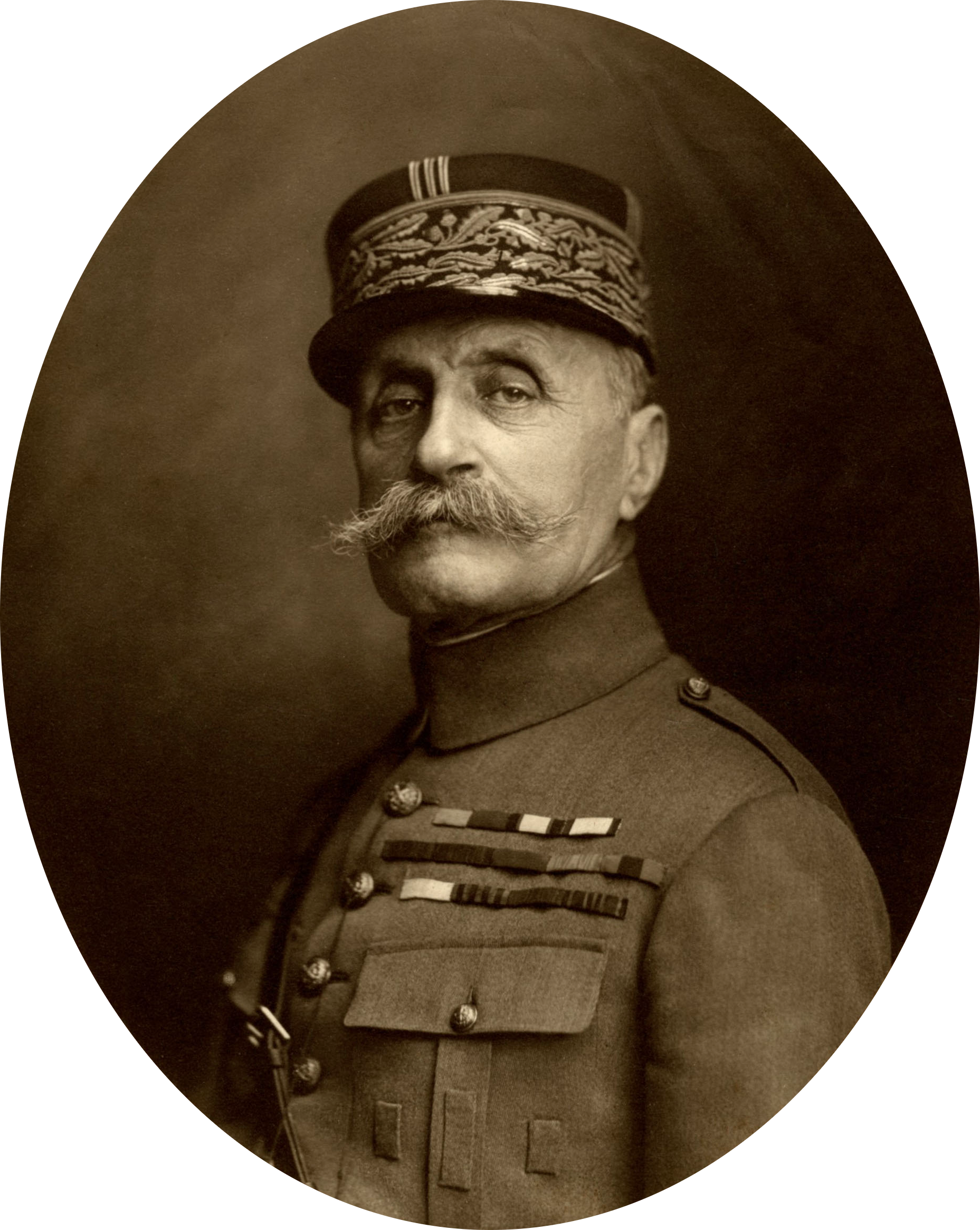
Marshal of France Ferdinand Foch
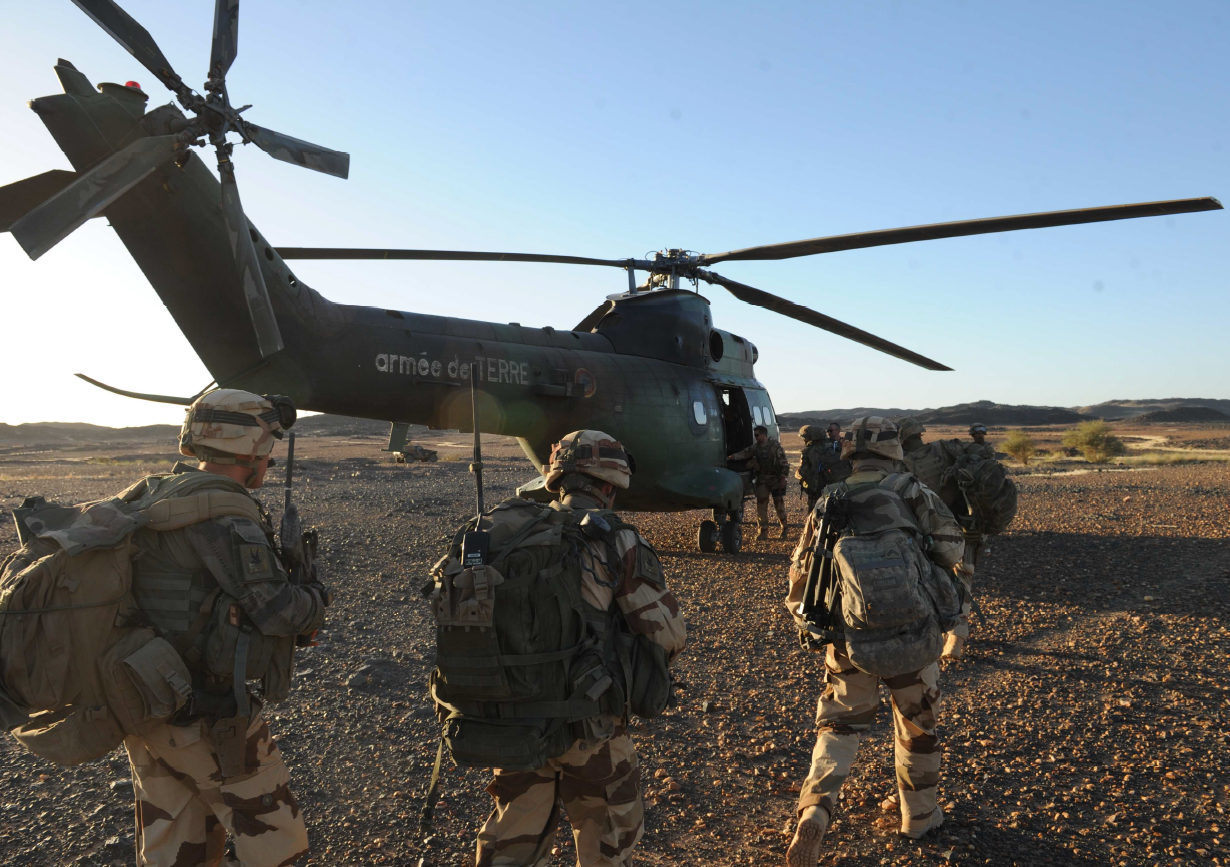
Mission Load Up

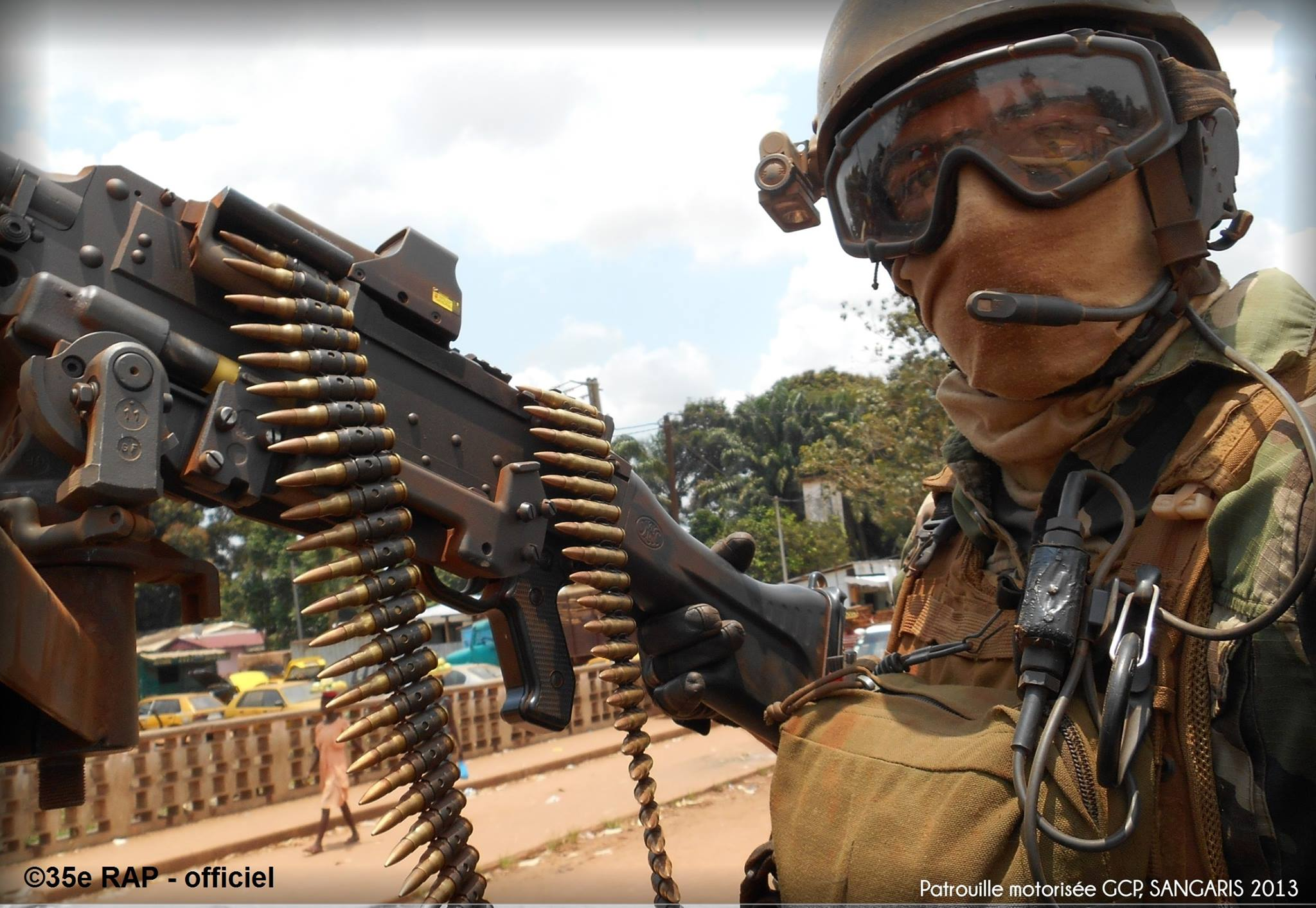
Mali - Commando Parachute Group motorised patrol

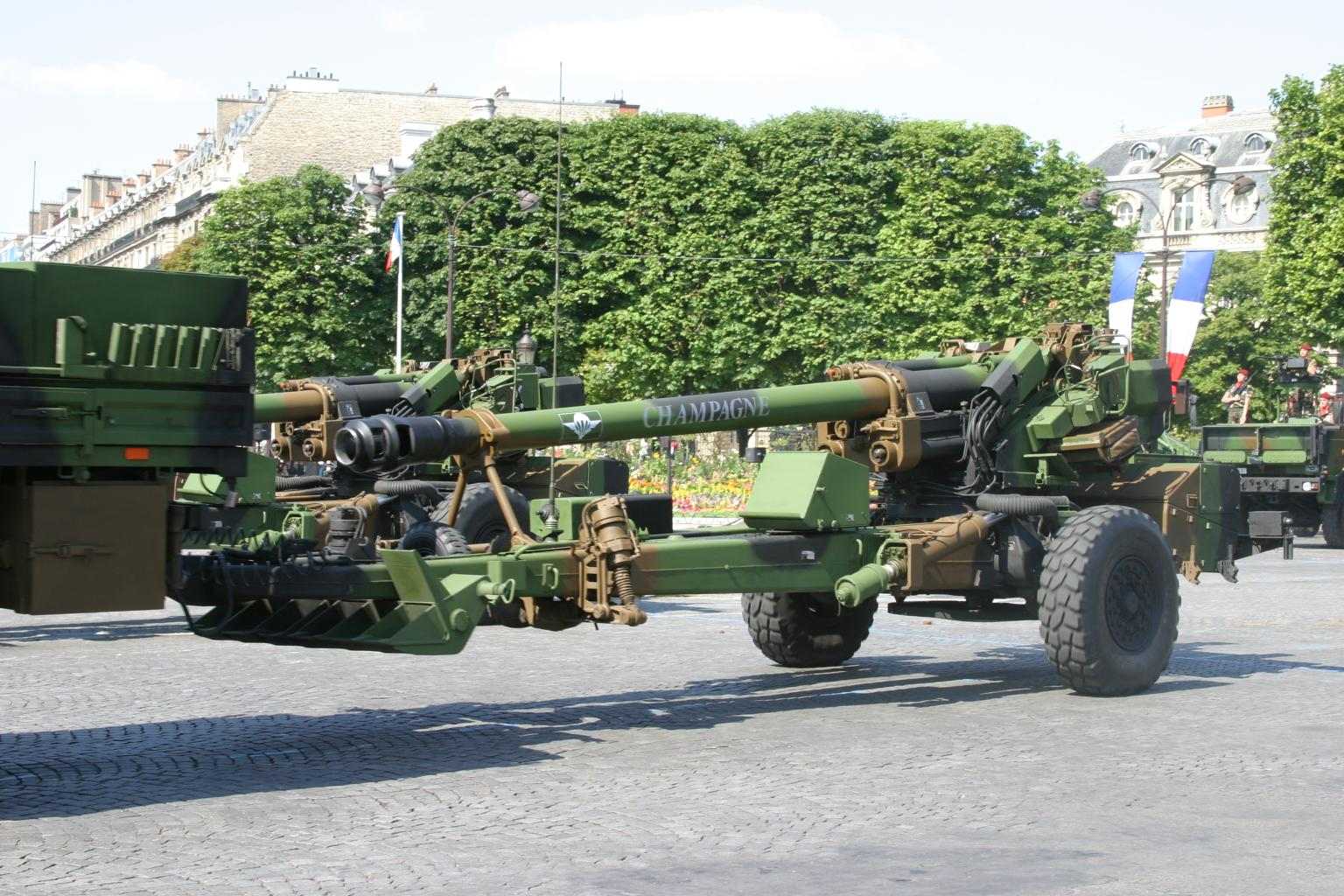
TRF1 Cannon of a 155 mm towed by a TRM 10000.

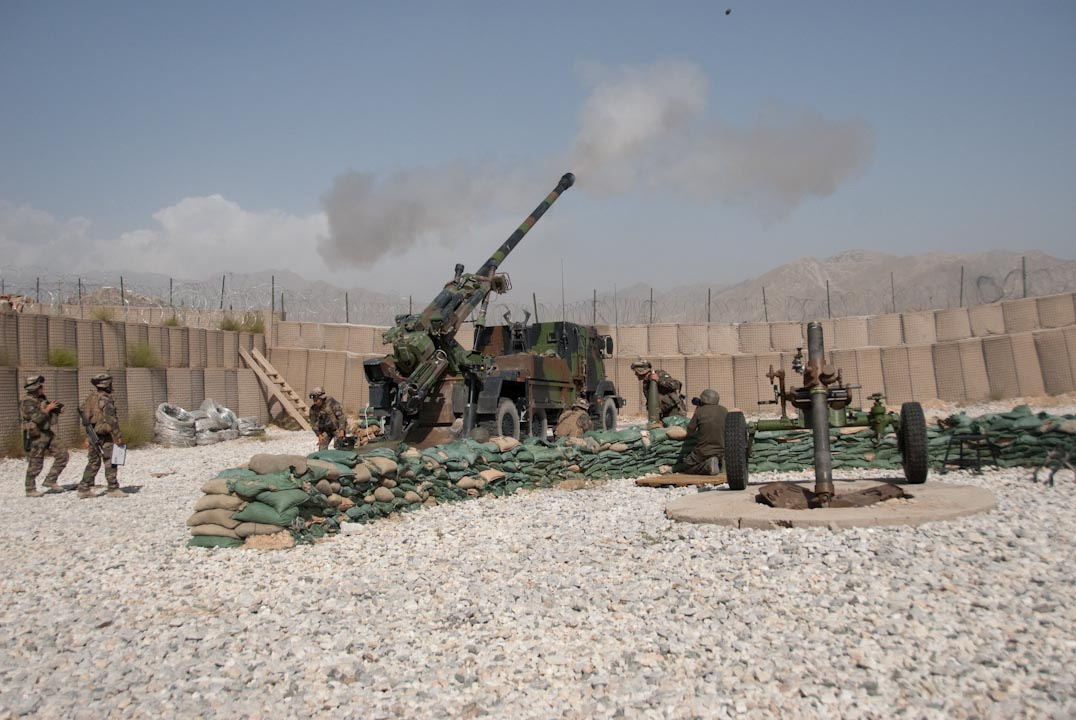
Afghanistan - CAESAR Fire

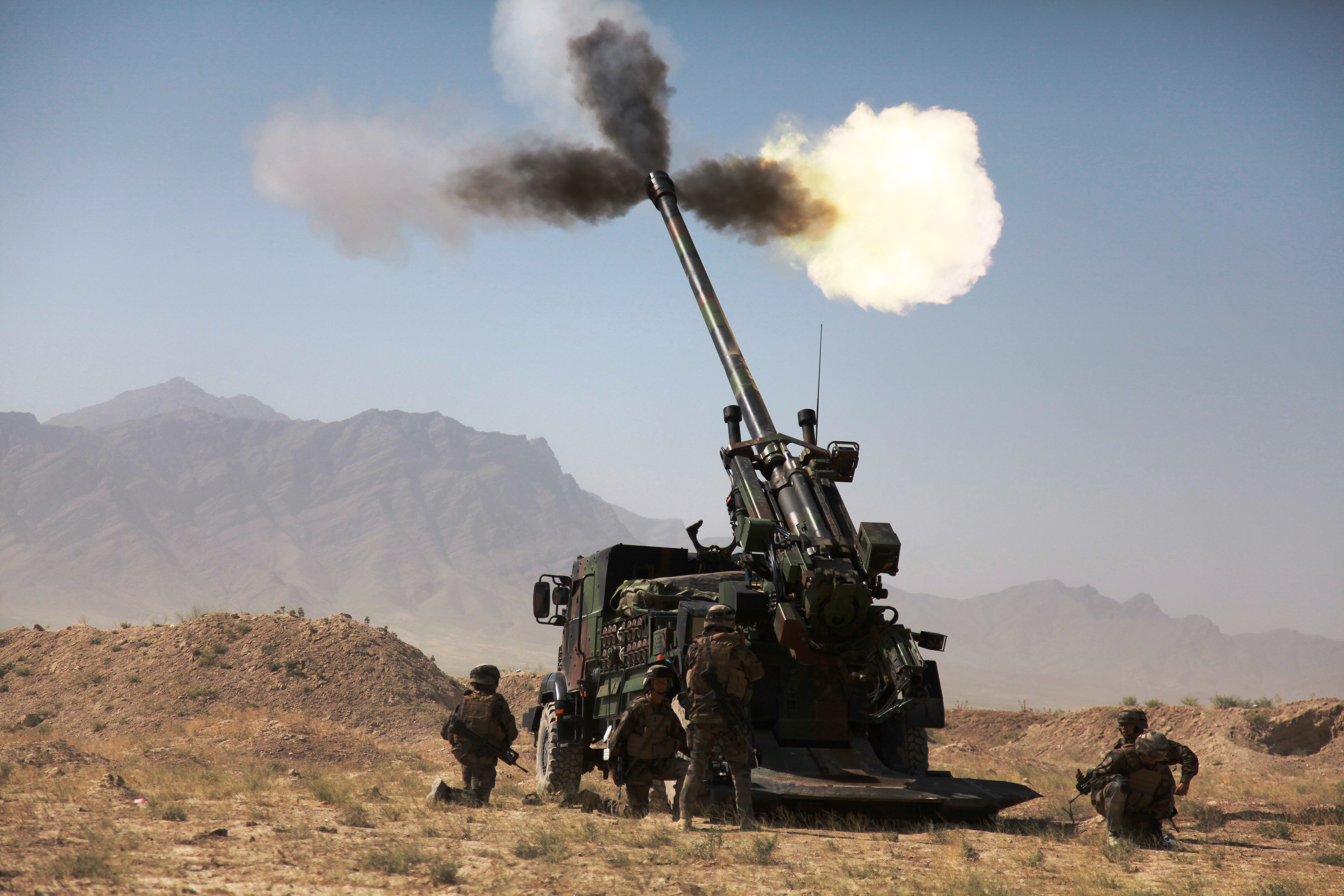
Practice round fire of a CAESER on August 14, 2009, in Afghanistan.

== See also ==
- List of French paratrooper units
- 5th Airborne Artillery Campaign Regiment
- Jean de Lattre de Tassigny
- 1st Foreign Parachute Heavy Mortar Company
