= 5th Airborne Artillery Campaign Regiment =

5th Airborne Artillery Campaign Regiment 5^{e} Régiment d’Artillerie de Campagne Aéroporté
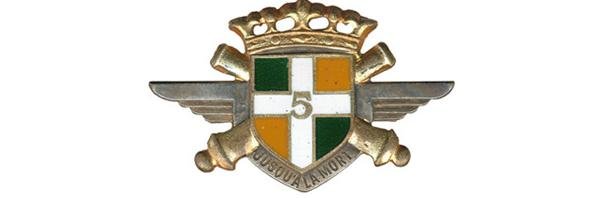
- Active: 1946 - 1949
- Country: France
- Branch: French Army
- Type: Artillery Regiment
- Role: Airborne Artillery
- Motto: Jusqu’à la mort

Insignia
- Abbreviation: 5^{e} R.A.C.A.P

The 5th Regiment of Airborne Field Artillery, (French: 5^{e} Régiment d'Artillerie de Campagne Aéroporté, 5^{e} RACAP) was an airborne artillery unit of the French Army from 1946 to 1949. The divisionary artillery regiment of the 25th Airborne Division, the regiment was heir to the 5th Artillery Regiment (French: 5^{e} Régiment d'Artillerie, 5^{e} R.A) of France. Elements passed to the 20th Light Parachute Artillery Regiment (French: 20^{e} Régiment d'Artillerie Légère Parachutiste, 20^{e} R.A.L.P), then to the 8th Artillery Regiment (French: 8^{e} Régiment d'Artillerie, 8^{e} R.A).

Founded in 1946 under the designation of 5^{e} R.A.P, the regiment would eventually bear the designation of R.A.C.A.P.

The regiment was composed of batteries equipped with diverse materials (wheeled cannon type 75mm, British 88mm, the U.S. cannon type 37mm anti-tank and the U.S. cannon type 75mmm) along with other anti-aircraft type equipments.

== See also ==
- List of French paratrooper units
- Jean de Lattre de Tassigny
- 35th Parachute Artillery Regiment
