= 6th Marine Infantry Parachute Regiment =

Airborne unit of the French Army

- 6^{e} Régiment de Parachutistes d'Infanterie de Marine
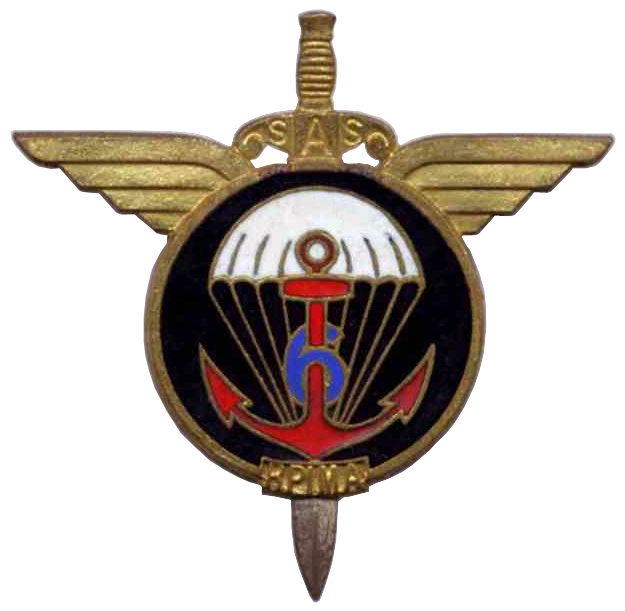
- Regimental insigne
- Active: 1948–1998; 2019-Present (same unit, different designations) 6^{e} BCCP 1948; 6^{e} GCCP 1950; 6^{e} BPC 1951; 6^{e} RPC 1955; 6^{e} RPIMa 1958–1998
- Country: France
- Branch: French Army
- Type: Marine Troops
- Role: Airborne
- Nickname: Bataillon Zatopek
- Mottos: Croire et Oser (To Believe and Dare)
- Colors: Red and Blue
- Anniversaries: Saint-Michel Day
- Engagements: First Indochina War; *Battle of Mạo Khê; *Operation Castor; *Battle of Dien Bien Phu; Algerian War; Lebanese Civil War: Multinational Force in Lebanon

Commanders
- Notable commanders: Chef de bataillon Marcel Bigeard

The 6th Marine Infantry Parachute Regiment (French: 6^{e} Régiment de Parachutistes d'Infanterie de Marine, 6^{e} RPIMa) is an airborne infantry unit of the French Army.

== Outline history since 1951 ==
- May 16, 1948: creation at Quimper of the 6th Colonial Parachute Commando Battalion (6e BCCP).
- October 1, 1950: became the 6th Colonial Parachute Commando Groupment, (6e GCCP).
- March 1, 1951: became the 6e Battalion parachutiste coloniale(6e BPC).
- August 20, 1951: disbandment of the battalion.
- July 5, 1952: the battalion is reconstituted at Saint-Brieuc. Marcel Bigeard gains fame as its commander.
- May 8, 1954: the battalion is disbanded
- August 1, 1955: remnants of the disbanded battalion were reinforced by elements of IV/6e RTS and formed the 6th Colonial Parachute Regiment (6e RPC).
- July 10, 1957: the regiment joins the 10th Parachute Division (10e DP).
- December 1, 1958: the 6th Colonial Parachute Regiment became the 6th Marine Infantry Parachute Regiment (6e RPIMa).
- June 30, 1998: disbandment of the regiment, as a result of the restructuring of the French Army.
- April 26, 2017: the flag of the 6e RPIMa is entrusted to the Initial Training Center for Non-Commissioned Members (CFIM) in Caylus.
- April 5, 2019: the CFIM, by the agenda n° 18 of the general commanding the 11th BP, is renamed the 6e RPIMa.

== History since 1948 ==
=== Indochina ===
The Colonial Parachute Battalions trace their origins to the 1st Colonial Parachute Commando Demi-Brigade in Brittan. The demi-brigade was heir to the paratroopers of Free France, the SAS Demi-Brigade and the group of shock ("choc") parachute battalions.

The 6e BCCP travelled to Indochina on July 28. The battalion fought valiantly on various sectors of the battle front and on March 30, 1951, the battalion resisted an enemy force four times larger for an entire night. Following a five hours of hand-to-hand combat, the battalion endured the loss of 51 men and 97 wounded. The battalion was accordingly dissolved on August 20, 1951 during embarkation for France.

It was recreated on July 5, 1952. It fought at Tu Lê, in October 1952 and then Langson, in July 1953.

The battalion fought at Dien Bien Phu. On November 20, 1953, it was part of the initial parachute entry during Operation Castor. On March 16, 1954, the 6th targeted the landing zone in the middle of the Battle of Dien Bien Phu. Despite heroic acts of valor, the battalion disappeared again, and was accordingly reconstituted.

=== North Africa ===
Reformed in Marrakesh, French protectorate of Morocco, on 1 August 1955 and named 6th Colonial Parachute Regiment. Active in the French colonies of French protectorate of Tunisia, French protectorate of Morocco and, particularly, French Algeria during the Algerian War as a part of the 10th Parachute Division.

=== France ===
The regiment left French Algeria on 6 July 1961 and went to Verdun. From January 1963 it was stationed in Mont-de-Marsan, the old instruction base for the Colonial Parachute Brigade.

=== Lebanon ===
The regiment deployed multiple times to Lebanon. It served within the United Nations Interim Force in Lebanon (UNIFIL) and with the Multinational Force in Lebanon during the Lebanese Civil War. It served alongside the 1st Parachute Chasseur Regiment, the 1st Parachute Hussard Regiment and the 31^{e} Brigade which included the Operational Group of the Foreign Legion, the 1st Foreign Cavalry Regiment, the 2nd Foreign Infantry Regiment and the 17th Parachute Engineer Regiment.

The regiment was dissolved 30 June 1998.

=== France ===
In the summer of 2017, the initial training center for non-commissioned members of the Caylus camp became "CFIM, le 6e RPIMa" then in April 2019 officially recreated under the name of 6e RPIMa.

== Traditions ==
French army metropolitan and marine paratroopers wear the Red Beret.

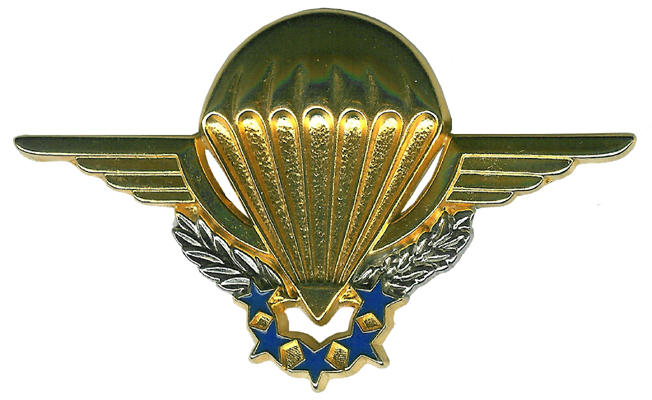
French Commando Parachute Group Brevet of Chuteur Opérationnel

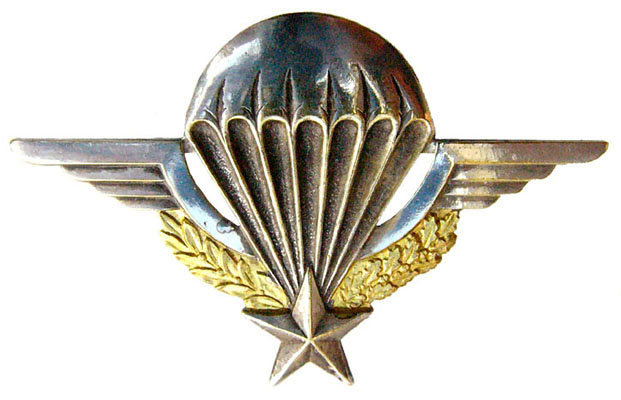
French Parachute Brevet.

The Archangel Saint Michael, patron of the French paratroopers is celebrated on 29 September.

The prière du Para (Prayer of the Paratrooper) was written by André Zirnheld in 1938.

=== Insignias ===
Just like the paratrooper Brevet of the French Army, the Insignia of French Paratroopers was created in 1946. The French Army Insignia of metropolitan Paratroopers represents a closed "winged armed dextrochere", meaning a "right winged arm" armed with a sword pointing upwards. The Insignia makes reference to the Patron of Paratroopers. In fact, the Insignia represents "the right Arm of Saint Michael", the Archangel which according to Liturgy is the "Armed Arm of God". This Insignia is the symbol of righteous combat and fidelity to superior missions. The French Army Insignia of Marine Infantry Paratroopers is backgrounded by a Marine Anchor.

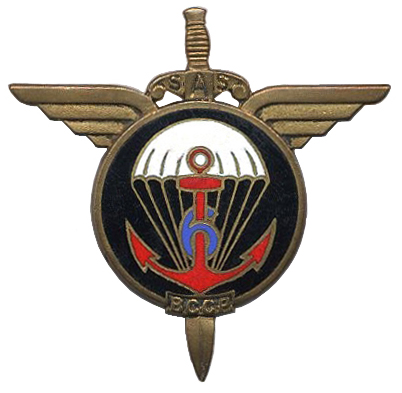
Insignia of the 6^{e} B.C.C.P

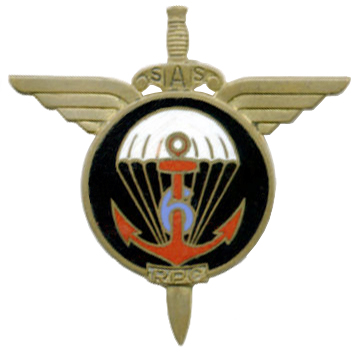
Insignia of the 6^{e} R.P.C

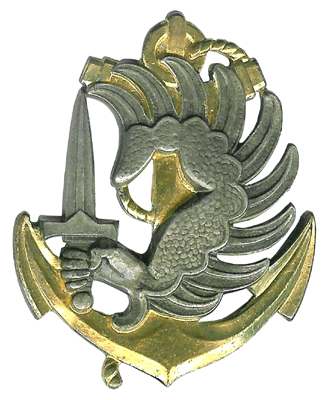
Beret insignia of the Marine Parachute Units

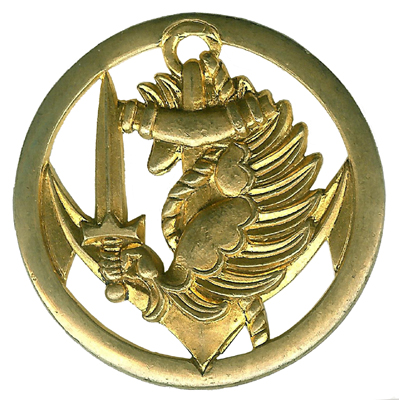
Former Beret insignia of Marine Parachute Units

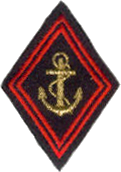
Left arm insignia of the Troupes de Marine

The insignia is mounted with an SAS dagger and was never modified, aside of the various successive inscriptions "BCCP", then "RPC", and finally "RPIMa".

=== Regimental colors ===
Regimental Colors of the 6th Marine Infantry Parachute Regiment

The regiment was heir to the 6^{e} BCCP created in 1948 and the 6^{e} RPC. The Regimental Color of the 6^{e} RPIMa, heir of the 6th parachute battalion bears the inscription "INDOCHINE" with 5 citations at the orders of the armed forces for the following:

- 1950 Pho Trach and Chaple
- 1951 Mao Khé
- 1952 Tu Lé
- 1953 Langson
- 1954 Dien Bien Phu

The regimental color was passed to Colonel Romain-Desfossés at Blida on November 5, 1957 by General Jean Gilles.

In eleven years of operations, the regiment endured the loss of 23 officers, 70 sous-officiers and 480 ranker paratroopers.

The regiment bears wearing in golden letters in the folds, the following inscriptions:

- INDOCHINE 1949–1954
- AFN 1952–1962

=== Decorations ===
The regimental colors of the 6th Marine Infantry Parachute Regiment is decorated with:

- Croix de guerre des théâtres d'opérations extérieures with:
  - 5 palms.

The regiment bears wearing 2 fourragère:

- Fourragère bearing the colors of the Médaille militaire.
- Fourragère bearing the colors of the Croix de guerre des théâtres d'opérations extérieures.
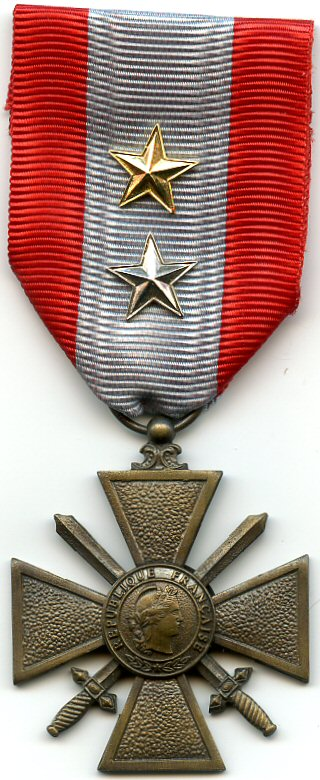
Croix de Guerre TOE

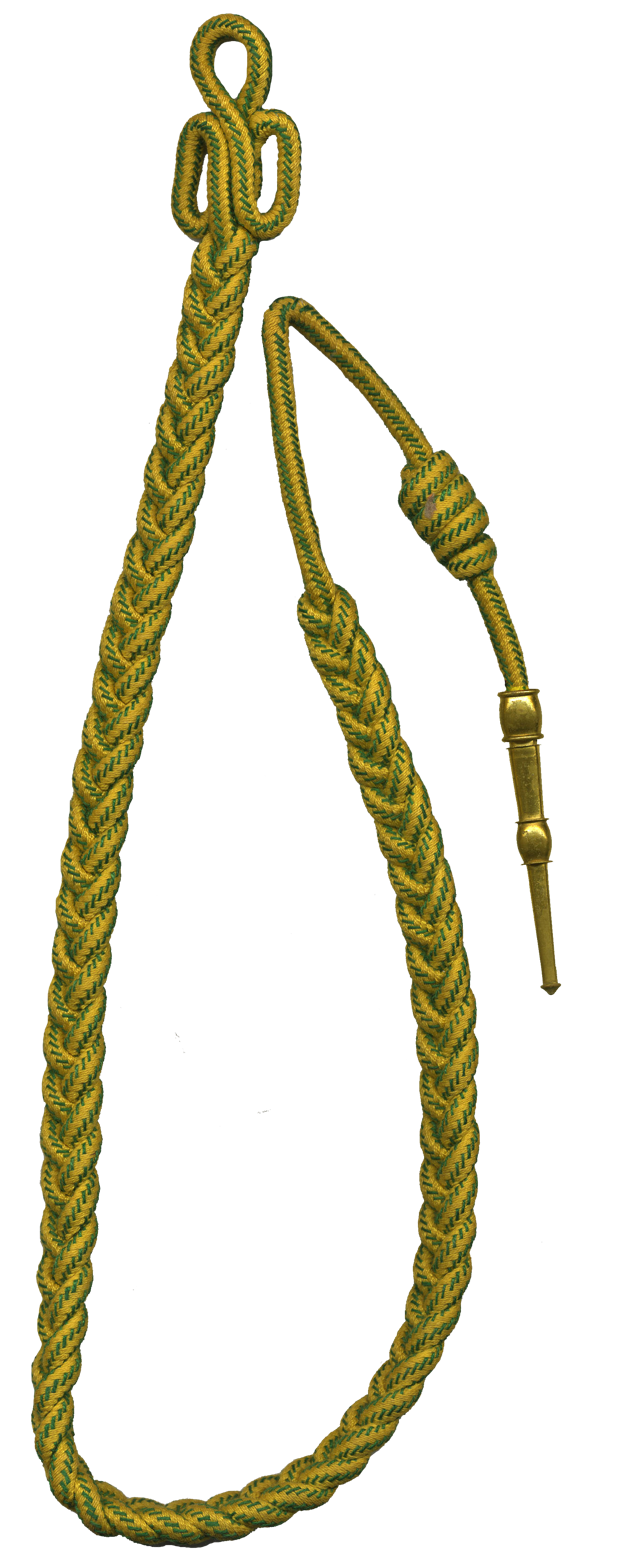
Fourragère aux couleurs de la Médaille militaire

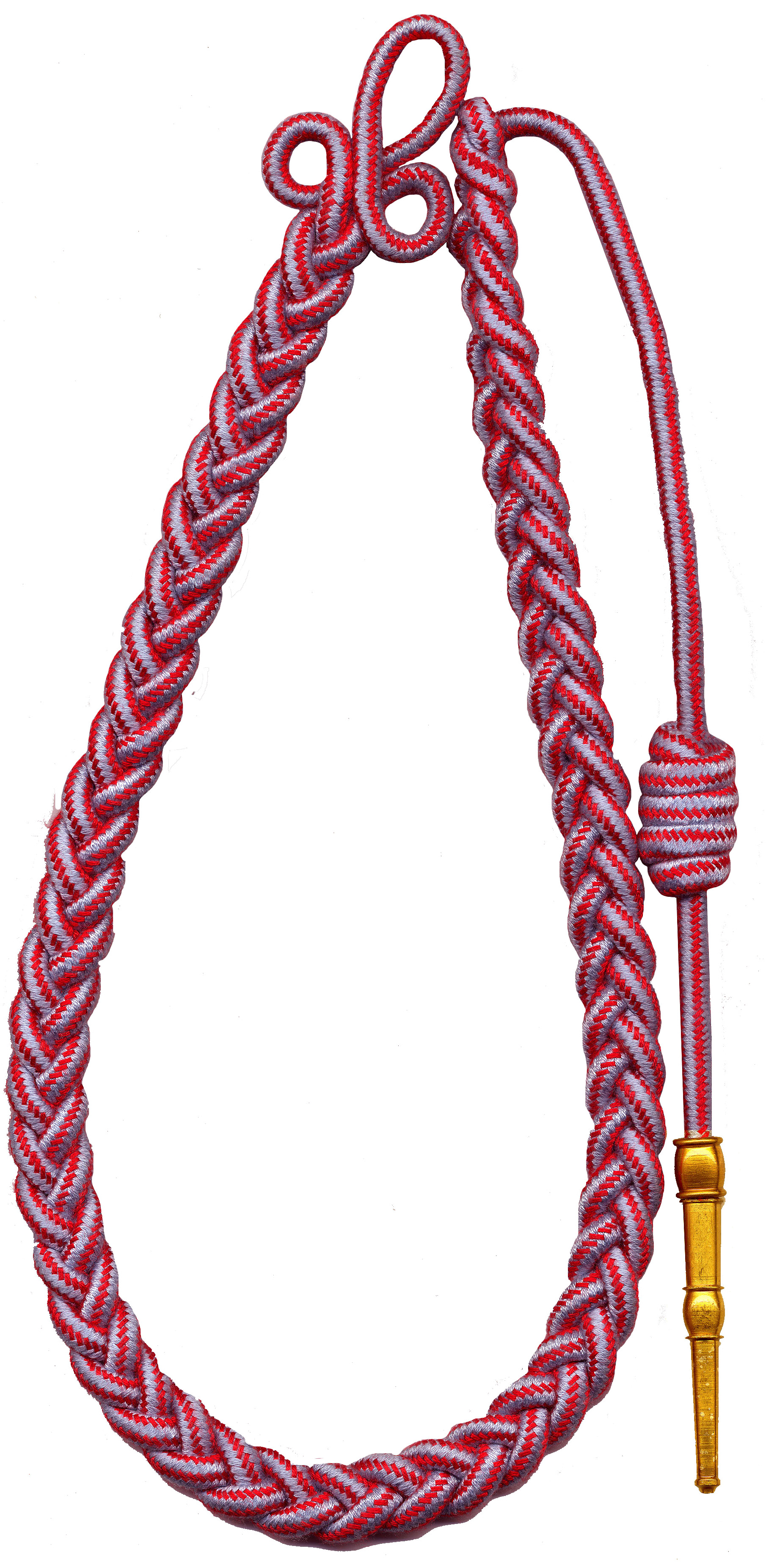
Fourragère aux couleurs de la Croix de Guerre des théâtres d'opérations extérieures

=== Honours ===
==== Battle honours ====
- Indochine 1949–1954
- AFN 1952–1962

== Regimental Commanders (1948–1998) ==
6^{e} BCCP–6^{e} GCCP–6^{e} BPC

- Major Vernières (1948–1950)
- Captain Balbin (1950–1951)
- Major Marcel Bigeard (1952–1954)
- Major Victor Chaudrut (1954–1955)

6^{e} RPC–6^{e} RPIMa

- Lieutenant Colonel Jacques Romain-Desfossés (1955–1958)
- Lieutenant Colonel Pierre Ducasse (1958–1959)
- Lieutenant Colonel Balbin (1959–1962)
- Lieutenant Colonel Picherit (1962–1963)
- Lieutenant Colonel Bley (1963–1965)
- Lieutenant Colonel Le Guillou (1965–1967)
- Lieutenant Colonel Ziegler (1967–1969)
- Lieutenant Colonel de Llamby (1969–1971)
- Lieutenant Colonel Vincendon (1971–1973)
- Lieutenant Colonel de Tonquedec (1973–1975)
- Lieutenant Colonel Béal (1975–1977)
- Lieutenant Colonel Dentin (1977–1979)
- Lieutenant Colonel Bertin (1979–1981)
- Lieutenant Colonel Serpol (1981–1983)
- Lieutenant Colonel Urwald (1983–1985)
- Lieutenant Colonel Quadri (1985–1987)
- Lieutenant Colonel Bordron (1987–1989)
- Lieutenant Colonel Gandouly (1989–1991)
- Lieutenant Colonel Perrin (1991–1993)
- Lieutenant Colonel Champenois (1993–1995)
- Lieutenant Colonel Caille (1995–1997)
- Lieutenant Colonel Dumousseau (1997–1998)

CFIM/6^{e} RPIMa

- Lieutenant Colonel Mercury (2016–2018)
- Lieutenant Colonel Hervé Oldra (2019-)

== Notable members of the 6^{e} RPIMa ==
- Erwan Bergot
- Roland Corbineau
- Pierre Tourret
