= Antoine Biancamaria =

French colonial infantry officer

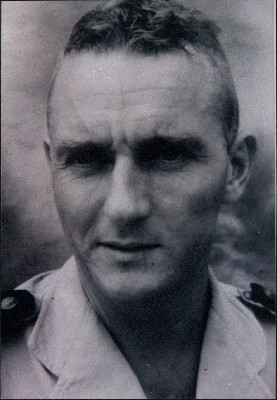
Image of Capitaine Antoine Biancamaria

Captain Antoine Dominique Biancamaria (23 January 1923 – 11 February 1959) was a French colonial infantry officer.

== Biography ==
=== Youth and training ===
Captain Antoine Dominique Biancamaria was born on 23 January 1923 in Avignon, in the Vaucluse. His father was a captain of the 58th Infantry Regiment there before being assigned to the 173rd Infantry Regiment in Corsica.

After good results in primary school, he entered the Prytanée national militaire of La Flèche in 1935. He left school in July 1940 and went to Corsica where he learned the captivity in Germany of his father, captain of the 2nd Battalion of the 173rd Regiment.

On April 22, 1941, his mother died of a serious illness. Biancamaria raised his infant sister Anne-Marie and his one-year-old brother Jérôme alone until his father returned in January 1942.

He obtained a scholarship to follow from 1942 to 1943 studies at the school of the lycée of Thiers, in Marseille.

=== Career in the army ===
On September 3, 1943, after the liberation of Corsica, Antoine Biancamaria enlisted in the colonial infantry and left for Algiers, where he was assigned to the 10th Senegalese Riflemen Regiment. He finished his military training there.

He successively became a corporal, then a master corporal and finally sergeant before being admitted to École militaire interarmes of Cherchell in November 1944.

Assigned to the 6th Colonial Infantry Regiment of the 9th Colonial Infantry Division, he left on October 26, 1945 for the Far East with his regiment.

He participated in all the operations of his unit in Cochinchina from November 1945 to February 1946, and in Tonkin from March 1946 to January 1948.

Appointed active sous-lieutenant on June 10, 1947, he was repatriated in June 1948 after 27 months of operations. Wounded in combat, he obtained five citation à l'ordre de l'armée and received on December 25, 1948, the Knight's Cross in the order of the Légion d'Honneur at 24 years old.

He was assigned from June 16, 1948 to February 12, 1949 in the 3rd Senegalese Tirailleurs Regiment in Tunisia. He was appointed lieutenant on June 10, 1949 and made a second trip to the Far East from July 13, 1949 to October 21, 1951. He joined the Annam center, took command of a company of the 21st colonial infantry regiment. After his repatriation, he joined the 3rd Colonial Infantry Regiment in the Paris region and prepared for the entrance exam to the general staff school in which he was admitted from July 1953 to July 1954.

This is his only assignment in mainland France. He was promoted to Officer of the Légion d'Honneur on July 21, 1955 at the age of 31. At the end of his internship at the general staff school, he was assigned to the general staff of the 25th Airborne Infantry Division, and participated under the command of General Gilles in the first operations of the war of Algeria in December 1954 and January 1955.

On February 21, 1955, he was sent by air to Dakar and was assigned to the staff of the 3rd Brigade in Bamako. He was appointed Capitaine on October 1, 1955. He joined the 4th brigade at Niamey, then was sent to the Saharan East, on the Nigerien border, at Dirkou, where he stayed from May 27, 1956 to September 4, 1957. He was responsible for construction of an air strip which is still used today and served in particular as a logistics base during the first Paris-Dakar rallies.

Repatriated in September 1957, he was assigned to the 8th Colonial Parachute Regiment on December 1, 1957.

He took command of the 2nd Company of the regiment. He participated in all the operations of his regiment and had the honor of being designated to parade with his company on July 14, 1958 in Paris.

=== Death ===
Under fire during the execution of an operation, he died of a bullet near the heart. Declared "Mort pour la France", he received a citation à l'ordre de l'armée. He was proposed by his unit for a posthumous promotion to the rank of Commandeur of the Légion d'honneur, but considered too young and this distinction was refused.

== Decorations and tribute ==
- Knight of Légion d'Honneur and declared "Mort pour la France".
- Croix de guerre 1939-1945 (1 star).
- Croix de guerre des théâtres d'opérations extérieures (1 palm, 7 stars).
- Cross for Military Valour (1 palm).

A street named is after him in the town of Vandeuvre les Nancy.

From May 22 to October 14, 2003, an exhibition describing his life took place in École spéciale militaire de Saint-Cyr.

His name appears on the war memorial of the city of Villanova, in Corsica.

His name also appears on the commemorative stele of the Algerian War, in Ajaccio.

=== Promotion of Captain Biancamaria ===
The 41st promotion of the joint École militaire interarmes (2001-2003) was called promotion "Honor to Captain Biancamaria".

The song of this promotion is entitled "Capitaine Biancamaria".
