= 1st Foreign Parachute Heavy Mortar Company =

- 1^{re} Compagnie Etrangère Parachutiste de Mortiers Lourds
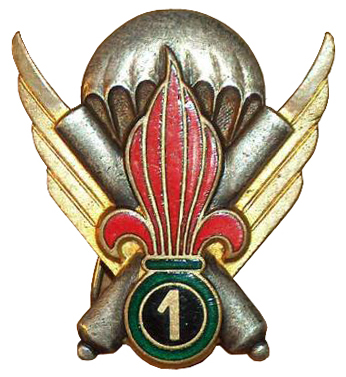
- Company Insignia
- Active: 1 September 1953 - 31 May 1954
- Disbanded: August 1954
- Country: France
- Branch: (France) French Army
- Type: Airborne forces
- Role: Artillery observer Close-quarters combat Direct action Fire support Indirect fire Jungle warfare Mountain warfare Patrolling; Raiding; Reconnaissance
- Size: 120 men
- Part of: Attached to 1st Foreign Parachute Battalion
- Garrison/HQ: Quynh Loi, Hanoi, French Indochina
- Colors: Green & Red
- Equipment: Twelve (12) Brandt 120mm mortars
- Engagements: Operation Castor; Battle of Dien Bien Phu

Commanders
- Notable commanders: Jacques Molinier; Erwan Bergot; Paul Turcy

Insignia
- Identification symbol: 1^{er} CEPML

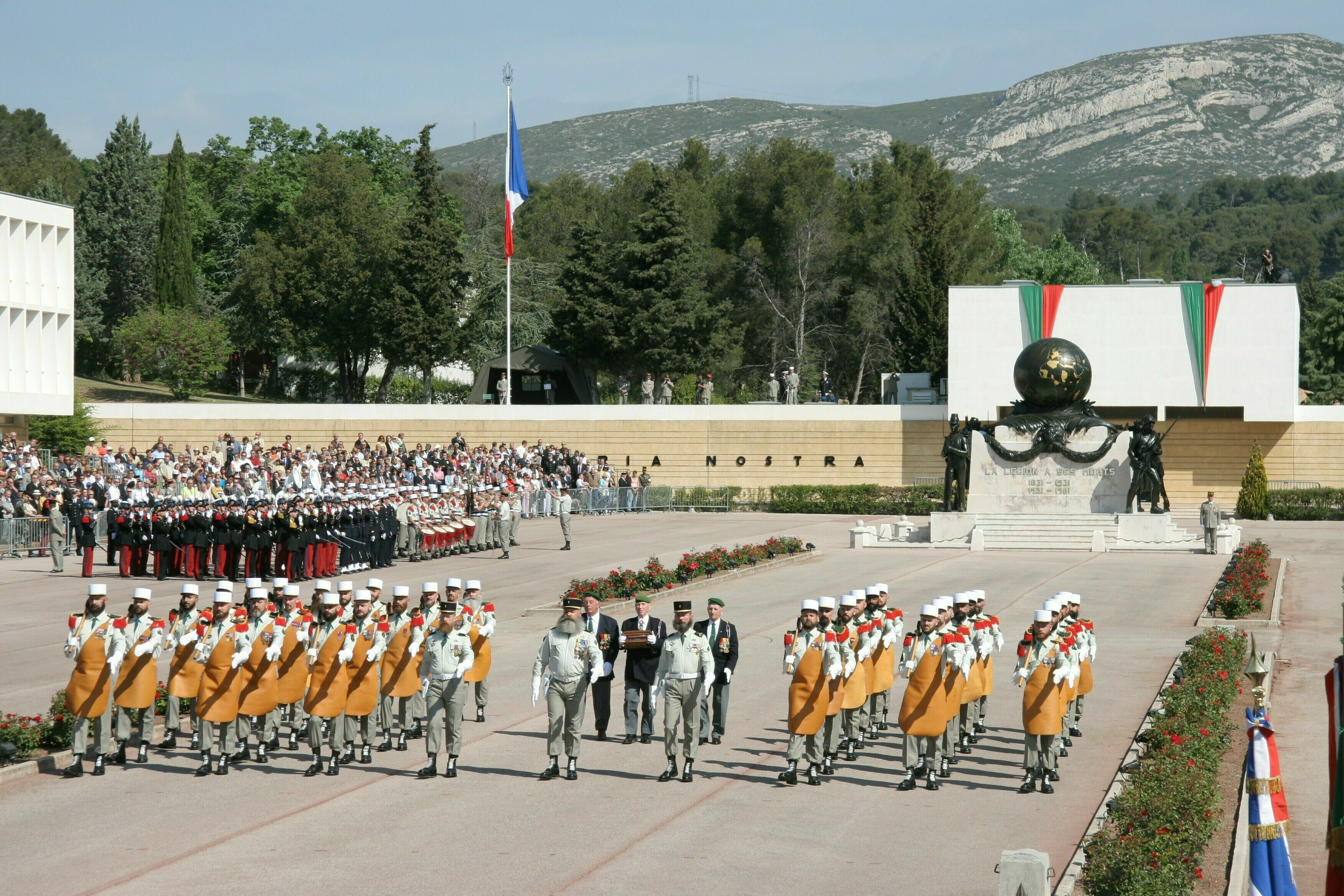
Each year, the Foreign Legion commemorates and celebrates Camarón in its headquarters in Aubagne and Bastille Day military parade in Paris; featuring the Pionniers leading and opening the way.

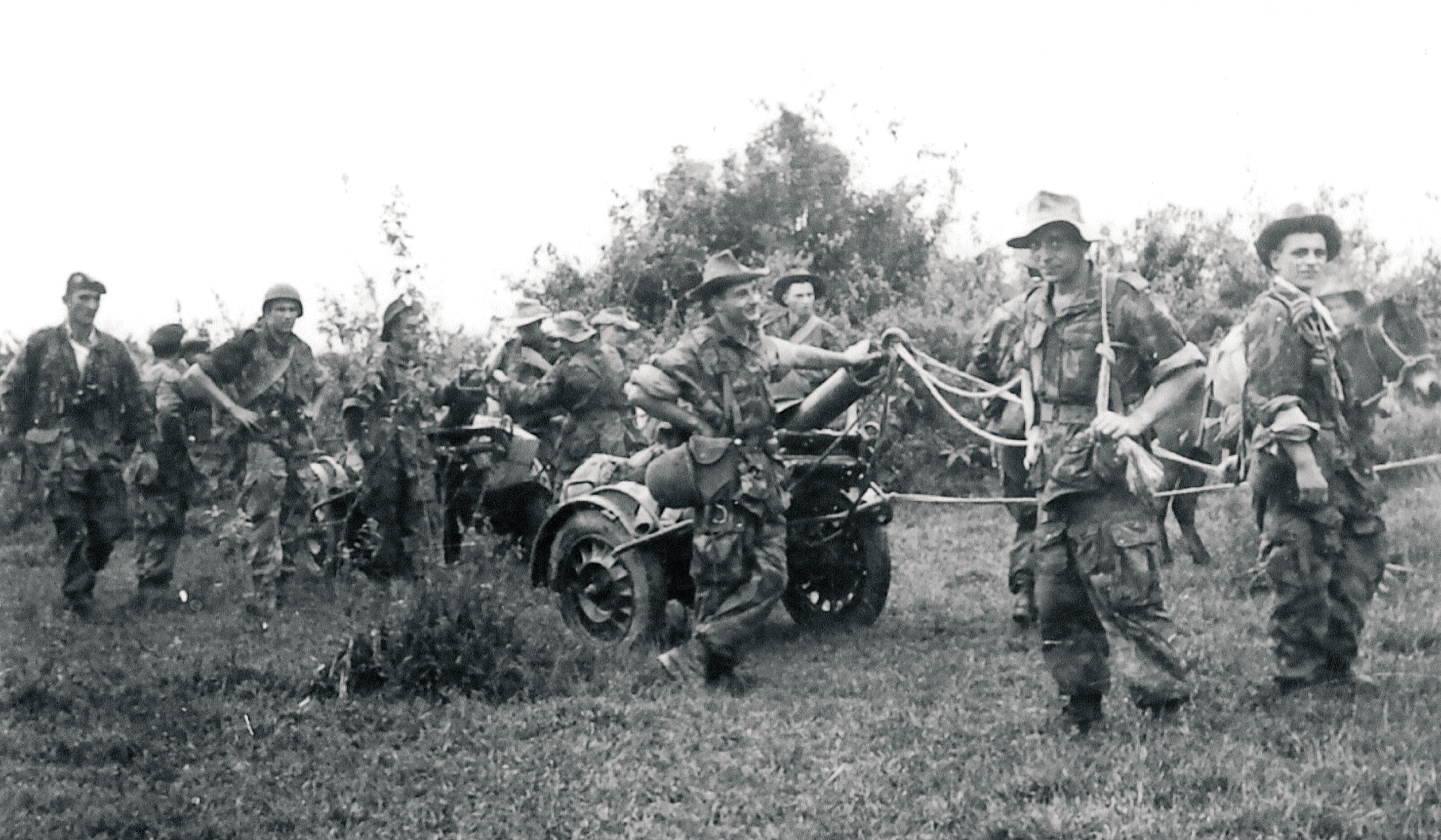
Members of the 1st Foreign Parachute Heavy Mortar Company in Indochina.

The 1st Foreign Parachute Heavy Mortar Company (French: 1^{re} Compagnie étrangère parachutiste de mortiers lourds, 1^{er} CEPML) was a short lived airborne forces heavy mortar of the Foreign Legion which fought during the First Indochina War at the corps of the French Far East Expeditionary Corps.

== History ==
In August 1953, lieutenant Jacques Molinier serves in the 1st Vietnamese Parachute Battalion (1^{er} BPVN). Accordingly, he is tasked by the headquarters of Hanoi to form a heavy mortar parachute combat company integrated in the French Foreign Legion and based in Tonkin. Created on 1 September 1953, based on elements, mainly artillery specialist of the 1st Foreign Parachute Battalion (1^{er} B.E.P) and 2nd Foreign Parachute Battalion (2^{e} B.E.P); the created combat company is administratively attached to the 1st Foreign Parachute Battalion (1^{er} B.E.P). The rear base of the company is situated at Quynh Loï, South of Hanoï.

The first operation launched by the 1st Foreign Parachute Heavy Mortar Company (1^{re} C.E.P.M.L) was to support of the 1st and 2nd Foreign Parachute Battalions. The company also made a combat jump alongside Chef de Battalion Marcel Bigeard's 6th Colonial Parachute Battalion.

On 21 November 1953 Lieutenant Molinier jumped on Dien Bien Phu with the first wave of Operation Castor, at the border Landing Zone (L.Z) Natacha. at 1500, 67 enlisted and officers, as well as 8 Brandt 120 mm mortars and 800 rounds of ammunition are dropped on the landing zone. At 1600, the company was in position to fire. This company is the first heavy 120 mm mortar unit to be dropped in an airborne operation. The 1st Foreign Parachute Heavy Mortar Company had packed the mortars in alvéoles type compartments about 3 to 4 meters in diameter. Following the drop, the company received another drop of a supplementary 4 120 mm mortars to make the total count of 12 120 mm mortars available with 99 officers, warrant officers, non-commissioned officers and legionnaires.

On 12 March 1954 Lieutenant Molinier was wounded during a recon operation conducted with the 1st Foreign Parachute Battalion 1^{er} BEP on “Béatrice”. Wounded by a dozen of pieces of shrapnel in the back and face, he is carried to the underground hospital of commandant-doctor Paul-Henri Grauwin, who had him evacuated by plane to Hanoi. For the officer, the Battle of Dien Bien Phu is over. Molinier passes command of the company to Lieutenant Paul Turcy who is killed on 14 March 1954. Accordingly, Lieutenant Erwan Bergot assumes interim command of the company until the parachute support of Lieutenant Jean Singland. On 7 May 1954 the final assault commenced and the French Foreign Legion fired their mortars in all directions during the defence.

On 1 June the 1st Foreign Parachute Heavy Mortar Company was dissolved. In its eight-month existence, the company fired more than 30,000 rounds and endured heavy losses: 24 killed, 43 wounded. At the liberation of the prisoners from the Viet-minh camps, only 17 had survived. Following the dissolution of the company, Lieutenant Molinier assumed command of the Command and Support Company (C.C.S) of the 1st Foreign Parachute Battalion (1^{er} B.E.P).

== Traditions ==
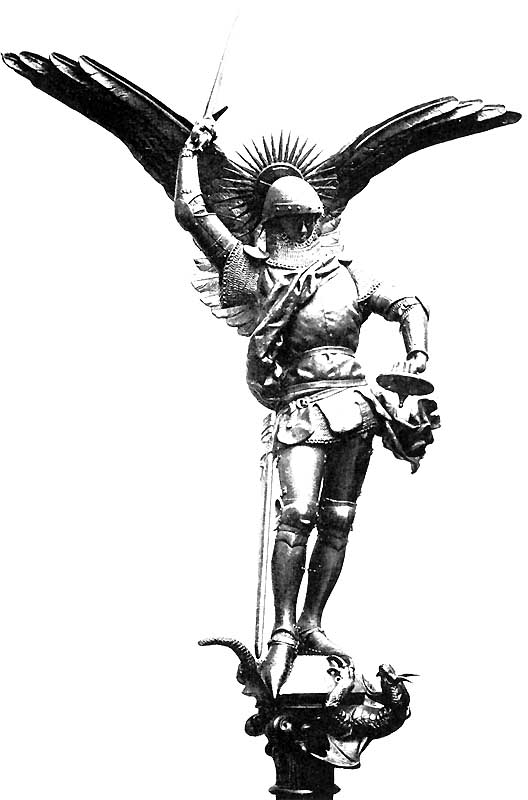
The Archangel Michael featured in Mont Saint-Michel and the Insignia of the 9th Parachute Chasseur Regiment.

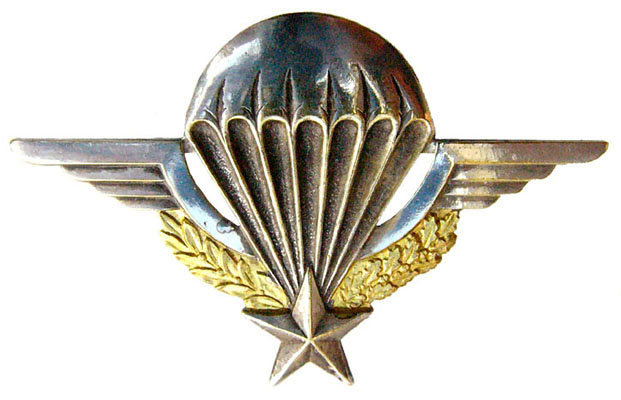
French parachute brevet.

=== Insignias ===
The insignia of the Foreign Legion Paratroopers of France represents a closed "winged armed dextrochere", meaning a "right winged arm" armed with a sword pointing upwards. The Insignia makes reference to the Patron of Paratroopers. In fact, the Insignia represents "the right Arm of Saint Michael", the Archangel which according to Liturgy is the "Armed Arm of God". This Insignia is the symbol of righteous combat and fidelity to superior missions.

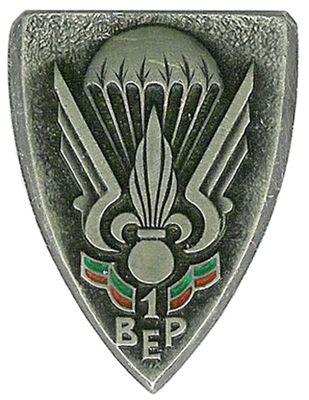
1^{er} B.E.P Insignia

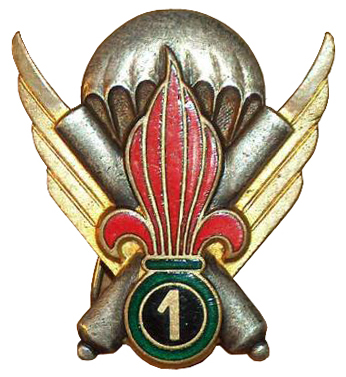
1^{re} C.E.P.M.L

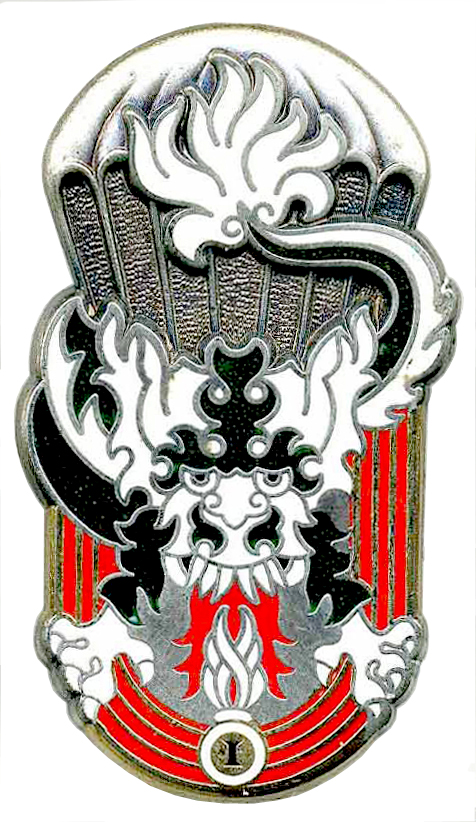
1st Vietnamese Parachute Battalion Insignia

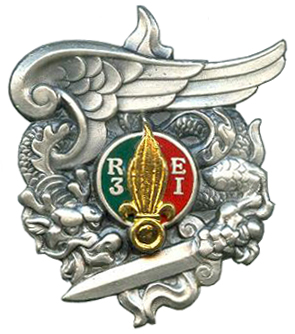
Co. Para du 3^{e} REI in the 1^{er} REP and 1^{er} BEP

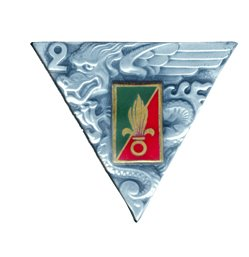
2^{e} B.E.P and 2^{e} R.E.P Insignia

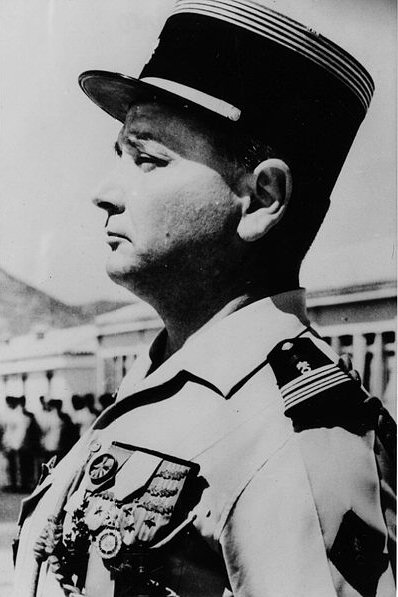
Colonel Paul Marie Félix Jacques René Arnaud de Foïard (1921–2005)

== Company Commander ==
- 1953 - 1954 : Lieutenant Molinier
- 1954 - 1954 : Lieutenant Turcy
- 1954 - 1954 : Lieutenant Erwan Bergot
- 1954 - 1954 : Lieutenant Singland

== See also ==
- Major (France)
