= Operation Castor =

French Union's military operation in the First Indochina War

- Part of First Indochina War
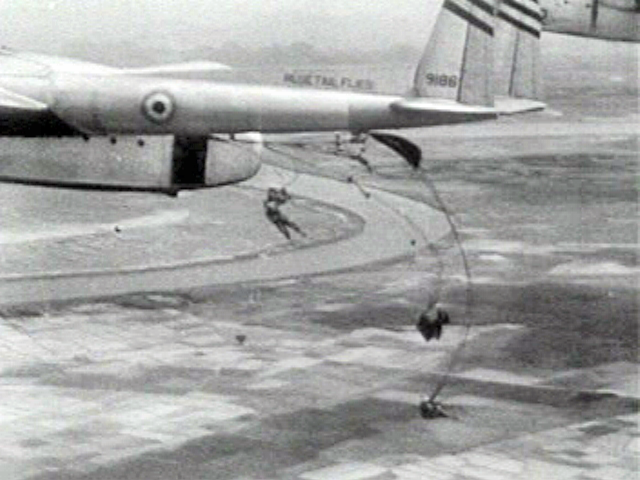
- French Union paratroops dropping from a C-119 over Battle of Dien Bien Phu
Date	20–22 November 1953
Location	Dien Bien Phu, Vietnam
Result	Successful establishment of the Dien Bien Phu outpost by the French Union

Belligerents
French Union: France; French Indochina; State of Vietnam	Democratic Republic of Vietnam: (North Vietnam) Việt Minh

Commanders and leaders
Jean Gilles; Jean Dechaux; Henri Navarre	Võ Nguyên Giáp

Strength
4,195 (as of 22 November)	One infantry battalion and one artillery battery

Casualties and losses
By 20 November: 11 killed, 52 wounded	92 killed 15 captured

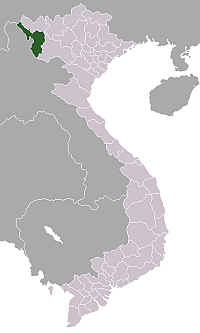
Điện Biên Province (shown in green) was sufficiently far from Hanoi, the seat of French Union military power, that it could not easily be supplied by air.

Operation Castor (Note: Some English sources erroneously translate the name of operation into the English "Beaver". However the name of the second operation (the evacuation of Lai Châu), which took place weeks later, "Pollux"; clearly indicates that this is an error and both names refer to mythological twins Castor and Pollux. Fall, Bernard B. (2002). "Notes". Hell in a very small place: the siege of Dien Bien Phu. New York, N.Y.: Da Capo Press. p. 467. ISBN 0-306-81157-X.) was a successful airborne operation for French Union forces in the First Indochina War. This operation of France and the State of Vietnam established a fortified airhead in Điện Biên Province against the communist Việt Minh, in the north-west corner of Vietnam and was commanded by Brigadier General Jean Gilles. The Operation began at 10:35 on 20 November 1953, with reinforcements dropped over the following two days. With all its objectives achieved, the operation ended on 22 November. Castor was the largest airborne operation since World War II.

== Execution ==
The French paratroopers of the 6^{ème} Bataillon de Parachutistes Coloniaux (6 BPC) and the 2nd Battalion of the 1^{er} Régiment de Chasseurs Parachutistes (II/1er RCP) dropped over Dien Bien Phu on the first day in order to secure the airstrip built by the Japanese during the occupation of French Indochina by Japan (1940-45). The operation took 65 of the 70 operational C-47 Dakota and all 12 C-119 Flying Boxcar transport aircraft the French had in the area, and still required two trips to get the lead elements into the valley. Also dropped in the first wave were elements of the 17^{e} Régiment de Génie Parachutiste (RGP) ("17th Airborne Engineers Regiment") and the Headquarters group of Groupement Aéroporté 1 (GAP 1), ("Airborne Group 1"). They were followed later in the afternoon by the 1^{er} Bataillon de Parachutistes Coloniaux (1 BPC) and elements of 35^{e} Régiment d'Artillerie Légère Parachutiste (35 RALP) and other combat support elements. Just after its landing, the 6 BPC ran into contact with the Việt Minh 910th Battalion, 148th Regiment, which was conducting field exercise in the area along with a battery from the 351st Artillery Division and an infantry company of the 320th Division. Fighting persisted until afternoon when the Việt Minh units eventually withdrew to the south.

The following day, the second airborne group, "GAP 2" – consisting of 1^{er} Bataillon Etranger de Parachutistes (1 BEP), 8^{e} Bataillon de Parachutistes de Choc (8 BPC), other combat support elements and the entire command and Headquarters group for the Dien Bien Phu operation under Brigadier General Jean Gilles – was dropped in. While on another drop zone, the heavy equipment came down and the engineers quickly set about repairing and lengthening the airstrip.

On 22 November, the last troops of the initial garrison, the 5^{e} Bataillon de Parachutistes Vietnamiens ("Battalion of Vietnamese Parachutists", 5 BPVN) of the Vietnamese National Army, jumped into the valley. In the same "stick" as the commander of 5 BPVN was Brigitte Friang, a woman war correspondent with a military parachutist diploma, and five combat jumps. These troops raised the Dien Bien Phu garrison to its full planned strength of 4,500. On November 30, orders were issued for the garrison to guarantee free use of the airfield, to hold the position to the last man, and to conduct attacks to retard buildups of Viet Minh forces. General Navarre created the outpost to draw the Việt Minh into fighting a pitched battle. That battle, the Battle of Dien Bien Phu, occurred four months after Operation Castor.

== French Union order of battle ==
Aeroportable Division Element (French: , Elément Divisionnaire Aéroporté, EDAP):

- Groupement Aéroporté 1 (GAP 1), (Airborne Group 1)

- GAP 1 Headquarters staff
- 1^{er} Bataillon de Parachutistes Coloniaux (1 BPC) (Colonial Parachute Battalion)
- 6ème Bataillon de Parachutistes Coloniaux (6 BPC) (Colonial Parachute Battalion)
- 2ème Bataillon, 1^{er} Régiment de Chasseurs Parachutistes ("1st Parachute Chasseur Regiment" II/1 RCP) (Light Infantry Parachute Regiment)
- 17^{e} Régiment de Génie Parachutiste (RGP) (17th Airborne Engineers Regiment)
- 35^{e} Régiment d'Artillerie Légère Parachutistes (35 RALP) (35th Light Artillery Parachute Regiment)

- Groupement Aéroporté 2 (GAP 2), (Airborne Group 2)

- 1^{er} Bataillon Etranger de Parachutistes (1 B.E.P) (Foreign Parachute Battalion)
- 8^{e} Bataillon de Parachutistes de Choc (8 B.P.C) (Parachute Shock Battalion)
- 5^{e} Bataillon de Parachutistes Vietnamiens (5 B.P.V.N) (Vietnamese Parachute Battalion)

- 1st Foreign Parachute Heavy Mortar Company
