= Foreign Air Supply Company =

- Compagnie étrangère de Ravitaillement par Air
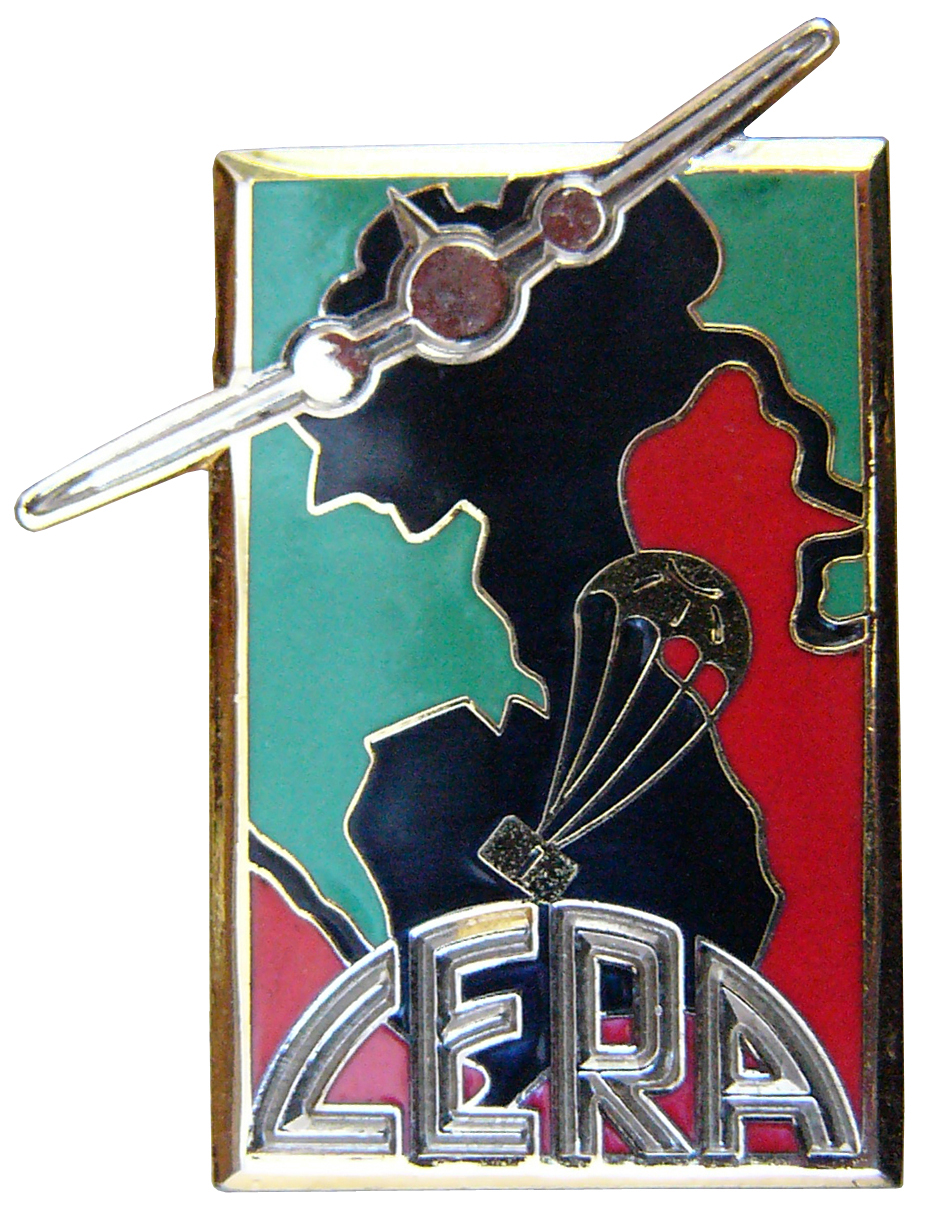
- Company Insignia
- Active: 1 January 1951 to 31 August 1951
- Country: France
- Branch: French Foreign Legion
- Type: Foreign Airborne Supply
- Garrison/HQ: Bac Mai
- Colors: Green and Red
- Anniversaries: Camerone Day
- Engagements: First Indochina War
- Abbreviation: C.E.R.A

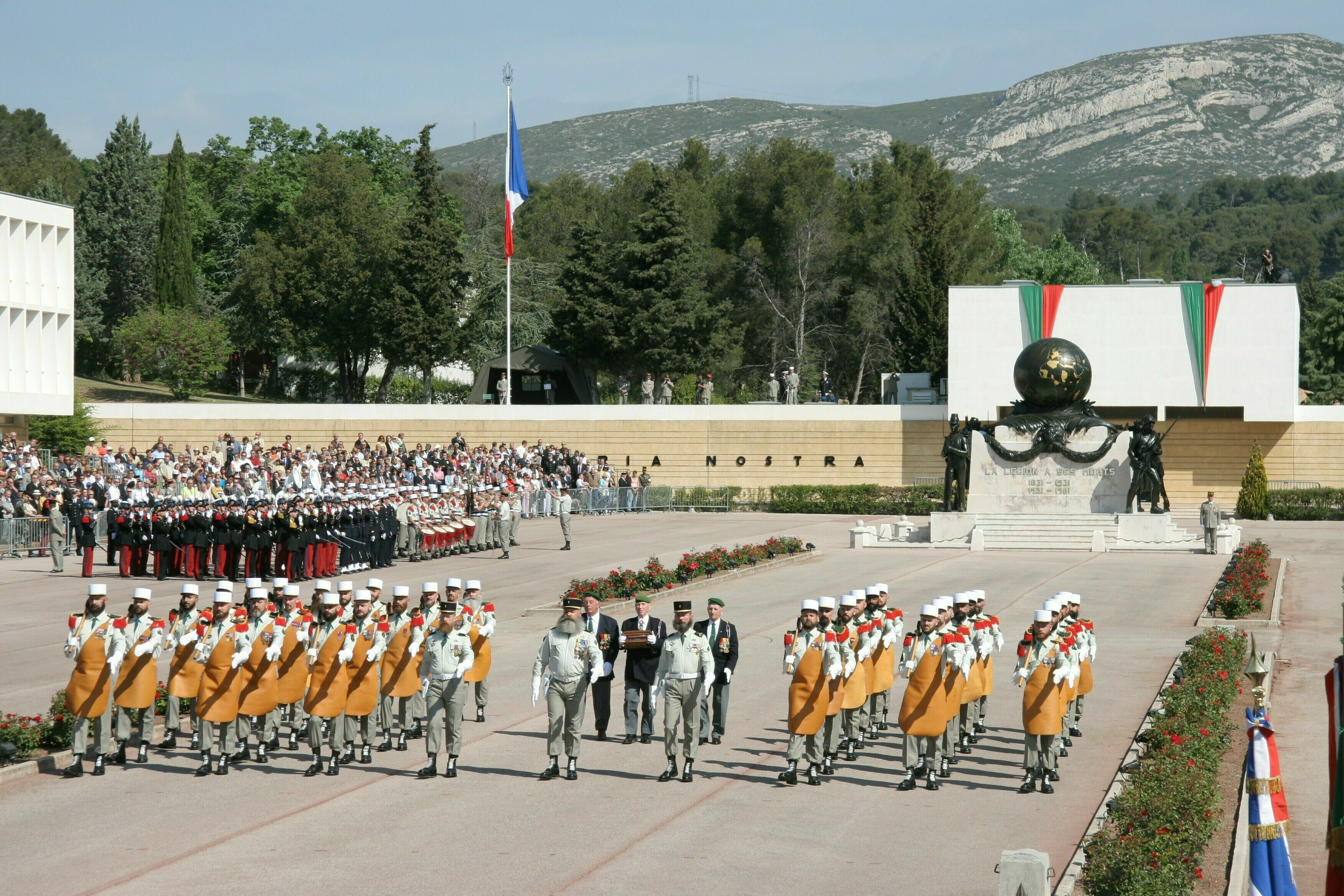
Each year, the French Foreign Legion commemorates and celebrates Camarón in its headquarters in Aubagne and Bastille Day military parade in Paris; featuring the Pionniers leading and opening the way.

The Foreign Air Supply Company (French: compagnie étrangère de ravitaillement par air) (C.E.R.A.) was an air supply unit of the French Foreign Legion. It provided air delivery of supplies during the First Indochina War.

From October 1948, the Compagnie de Ravitaillement Par Air des Troupes Françaises d’Indochine Nord was assigned to the 1er RCP; then was renamed CRA de la Base Aéroportée Nord (CRA/BAPN) on 1 January 1949.

The company was created on 1 January 1951 from the Air Supply Company (CRA/BAPN). Stationed at Hanoi until 1 August, the foreign combat company was in charge of delivering logistical supply and was manned by 120 legionnaires and 70 autochthones.

Dissolved, the foreign combat company became, on 1 September 1951, the Air Supply Company of the Land Forces of North Vietnam (CRA/FTNV). It then became CRA 3 in 1953.
