= 24th Airborne Division =

- 24^{e} Division Aéroportée
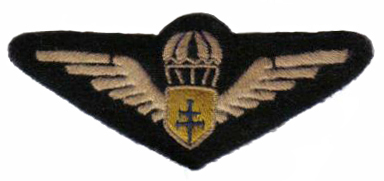
- Active: 1945 - 1945
- Country: France
- Branch: French Army
- Type: Airbrone Division
- Role: Airborne Infantry
- Size: 1^{e} R.C.P; 2^{e} R.C.P; 1^{er} R.I.C.A.P; 1/8^{e} R.C.C; 11^{e} R.A; 61^{e} G.A.F.T.A; 79^{e} B.G

Commanders
- Notable commanders: Général Bonjour

Insignia
- Abbreviation: 24^{e} D.A.P

The 24th Airborne Division, (French: 24^{e} Division Aéroportée, (24^{e} D.A.P.)) was a unit of the French Army, infantry dominated, specialized in airborne combats and air assaults. Constituted in July 1945, the Division existed ephemerally and during the dissolution in October of the same year, a significant amount of the Division's constitution would be seen transferred to the 25th Airborne Division in lieu recently of being constituted.

The division was created on July 16, 1945 and dissolved on October 15, 1945.

== History, garrisons, campaigns and battles ==
This Division, first of a kind in France, was constituted on July 16, 1945 based on the U.S. model. The forming infantry components of the Division were based on the active paratrooper units present in the Air Force, the 1st Parachute Chasseur Regiment (1^{e} R.C.P.), the 2nd Parachute Chasseur Regiment (2e RCP), the 3rd Parachute Chasseur Regiment 3^{e} R.C.P, the 4^{e} R.I.A S.A.S and the 1st Choc Airborne Infantry Regiment 1^{er} R.I.C.A.P, constituting the Choc Battalions B.C of the 1st Army with other forming infantry contingents from other active Divisions.

With numbers of effectives undergoing reduction, the 3rd Parachute Chasseur Regiment (3^{e} R.C.P.) and the 4^{e} R.I.A were dissolved. During this period, elements of the French Air Force were transferred to the French Army on August 1, 1945.

The 24th Airborne Division was dissolved. Elements remaining of the 1st Parachute Chasseur Regiment, 1^{e} R.C.P, the 2nd Parachute Chasseur Regiment 2^{e} R.C.P, the 1st Choc Airborne Infantry Regiment 1^{er} R.I.C.A.P and other forming components were transferred to the 25th Motoryzed Infantry Division 25^{e} D.I.M, which would become the 25th Airborne Division 25^{e} D.A.P in February 1946. Accordingly, général Bonjour assumed command of the newly formed 25th Airborne Division.

== Division Commander ==
- 1945 - 1945 : général Auguste-Leon Bonjour

== See also ==
- Moroccan Division
- Jean de Lattre de Tassigny
- List of French paratrooper units
