= List of French paratrooper units =

List of French airborne units from the Interwar period to the present

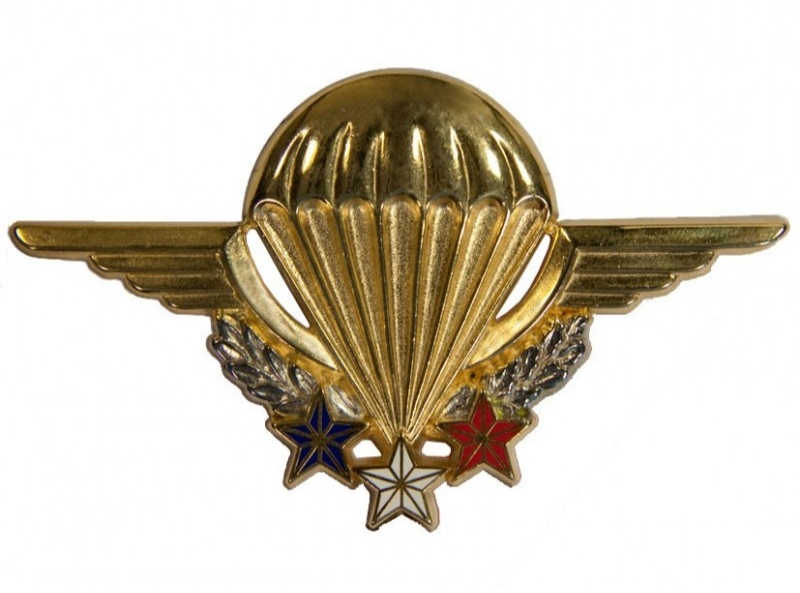
Chuteur Opérationnel Instructor and Moniteur Brevet of the French Armed Forces.

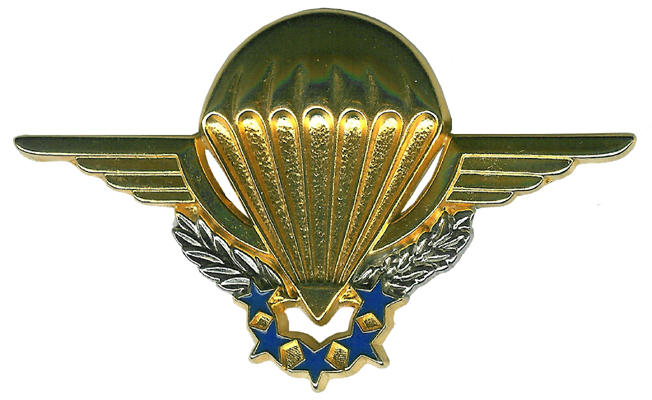
Chuteur Opérationnel Brevet of Commando Parachute Group of the French Army.

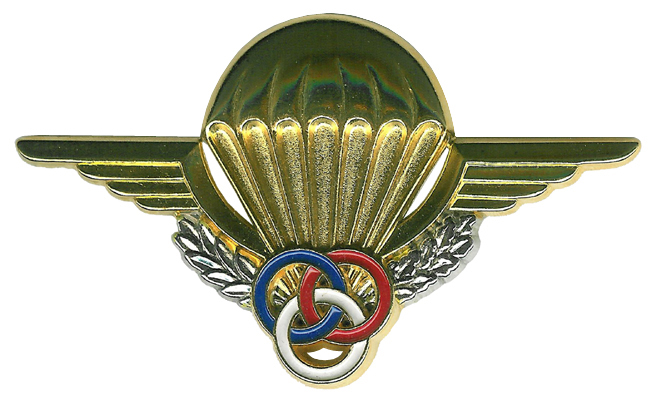
Paratrooper Moniteur Brevet of the French Armed Forces.

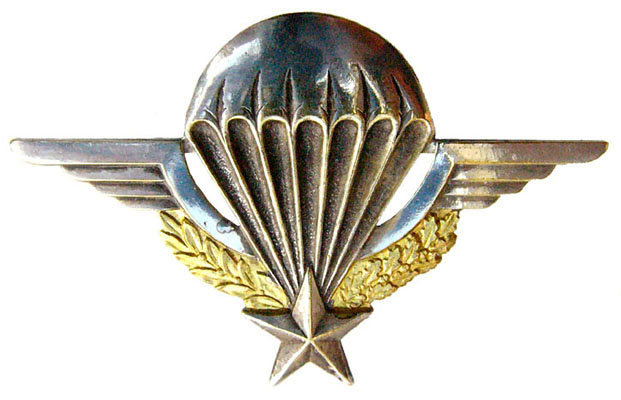
French Army Parachute Brevet.

The history of French airborne units began in the Interwar period when the French Armed Forces formed specialized paratrooper units. First formed in the French Air Force, they were rapidly integrated into the French Army, French Navy, National Gendarmerie and from the British Armed Forces. Some were later included in the postwar French Armed Forces.

== French Army ==
=== Parachute and airborne divisions ===
- 24th Airborne Division (24^{e} DAP, 25th Motorized Infantry Division 25^{e} DIM, then 25th Airborne Division 25^{e} DAP).
- 25th Airborne Division (25th Motorised Infantry Division 25^{e} DIM; then, 25th Airborne Division 25^{e} DAP dissolved).
- 25th Parachute Division (25th Parachute Division 25^{e} DP, dissolved).
- 10th Parachute Division (10th Parachute Division 10e DP, dissolved).
- 11th Light Intervention Division (11th Light Intervention Division 11^{e} DLI formed from 10th Parachute Division 10^{e} DP and 25th Parachute Division 25^{e} DP).
- 11th Division (11th Division 11^{e} DIV formed from merger of 11th Light Intervention Division 11^{e} DLI and 9^{e} Brigade 9^{e} BDE).
- 11th Parachute Division (11th Division 11^{e} DIV, then 11th Parachute Division 11^{e} DP).
- 11th Parachute Brigade (11th Parachute Division 11^{e}DP, then 11th Parachute Brigade 11^{e} BP).

=== Parachute Brigades and Groups ===
- The 11th Parachute Brigade (11^{e} B.P) of the French Army includes:
  - Commando Parachute Group (G.C.P Teams)
    - 1st Parachute Chasseur Regiment, (1^{er} RCP) (G.C.P commando Teams).
    - 1st Parachute Hussar Regiment, (1^{er} RHP) (G.C.P Teams).
    - 1st Train Parachute Regiment (1^{er} RTP).
    - 2nd Foreign Parachute Regiment, (2^{e} REP) (G.C.P Teams).
    - 3rd Marine Infantry Parachute Regiment, (3^{e} RPIMa) (G.C.P Teams).
    - 8th Marine Infantry Parachute Regiment, (8^{e} RPIMa) (G.C.P Teams).
    - 17th Parachute Engineer Regiment, (17^{e} RGP) (G.C.P Teams).
    - 35th Parachute Artillery Regiment, (35^{e} RAP) (G.C.P Teams).
- Airborne Groupment, GAP (French: Groupement Aéroporté).

=== Parachute Demi-Brigades ===
- SAS Parachute Demi-Brigade (D-B.P-SAS, later 1^{er} RPIMa).
- Colonial Parachute Commando Demi-Brigade (D-B.CCP, later 1^{er} RPIMa).
- 1st Colonial Parachute Commando Demi-Brigade (1^{re} Demi-Brigade Coloniale de Commandos Parachutistes) (1^{re} DBCCP, later 1^{er} RPIMa).
- 2nd Colonial Parachute Commando Demi-Brigade (2^{e} DBCCP, later 1^{er} RPIMa).
- Parachute Marching Demi-Brigade (Demi-Brigade de Marche Parachutiste) (DBMP - dissolved).
- 11th Parachute Choc Demi-Brigade (11^{e} Demi-Brigade Parachutiste de Choc) (11^{e} D-B.PC - dissolved).

=== Parachute centres of formation and schools ===
- École des troupes aéroportées) (BETAP), Base School of Airborne Troops .
- School of Airborne Troops (ETAP).
- School Brigade of Colonial Paratroopers.
- National Parachute Instruction Centre (NPIC) Orléans (Dissolved).

=== Foreign Legion ===
Seven Flame grenade of the Foreign Legion.

==== Legion parachute companies, battalions and regiments ====
- Parachute Company of the 3rd Foreign Infantry Regiment (C.P. du 3e R.E.I. attached to the III^{e}/1^{er} R.C.P - dissolved then 1^{er} B.E.P).
- Foreign Air Supply Company (CERA - dissolved).
- 1st Foreign Parachute Heavy Mortar Company (1re C.E.P de M.L]] - dissolved).
- 1st Foreign Parachute Battalion (1e BEP, III Formations; then, 1^{er} R.E.P - dissolved).
- 1st Foreign Parachute Regiment (1e REP - dissolved).
- 3rd Foreign Parachute Battalion (3^{e} B.E.P, IV Formations with 1^{er} B.E.P and 2^{e} B.E.P; then, 3^{e} R.E.P - dissolved).
- 3rd Foreign Parachute Regiment (3^{e} R.E.P - dissolved, merged with 2^{e} B.E.P, then 2^{e} R.E.P).
- 2nd Foreign Parachute Battalion (2^{e} B.E.P, V Formations with 3^{e} B.E.P then 2^{e} R.E.P - dissolved).
- 2nd Foreign Parachute Regiment, 2^{e} R.E.P, (Commando Parachute Group Teams)
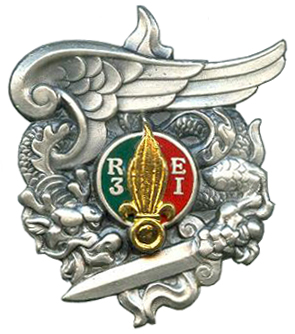
C.P du 3^{e} R.E.I in the 1^{er} B.E.P and 1^{er} R.E.P

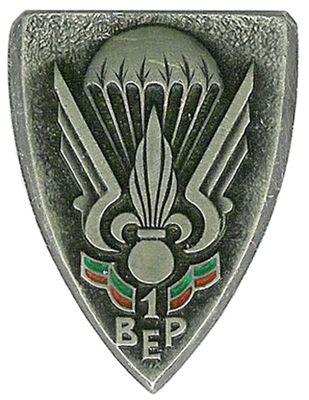
1^{er} B.E.P

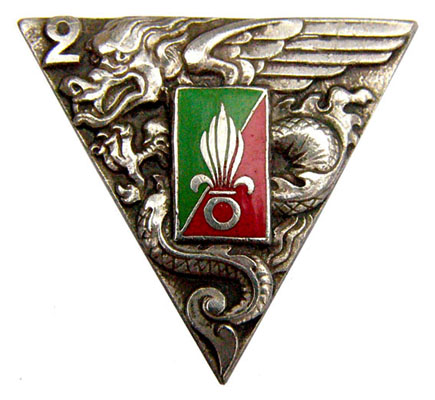
2^{e} B.E.P

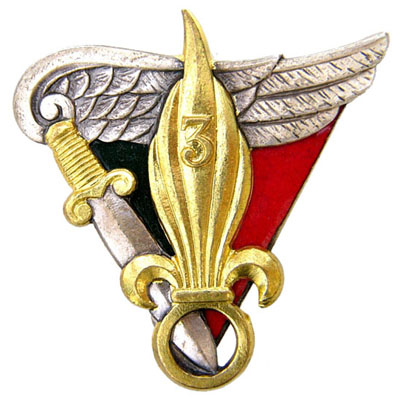
3^{e} B.E.P & 3^{e} R.E.P
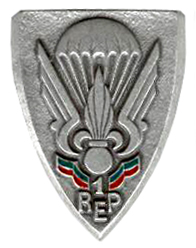
1^{er} R.E.P

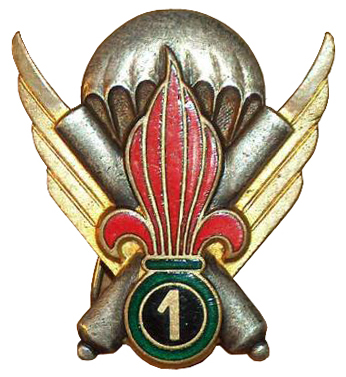
1^{re} C.E.P de M.L of the 1^{er} B.E.P

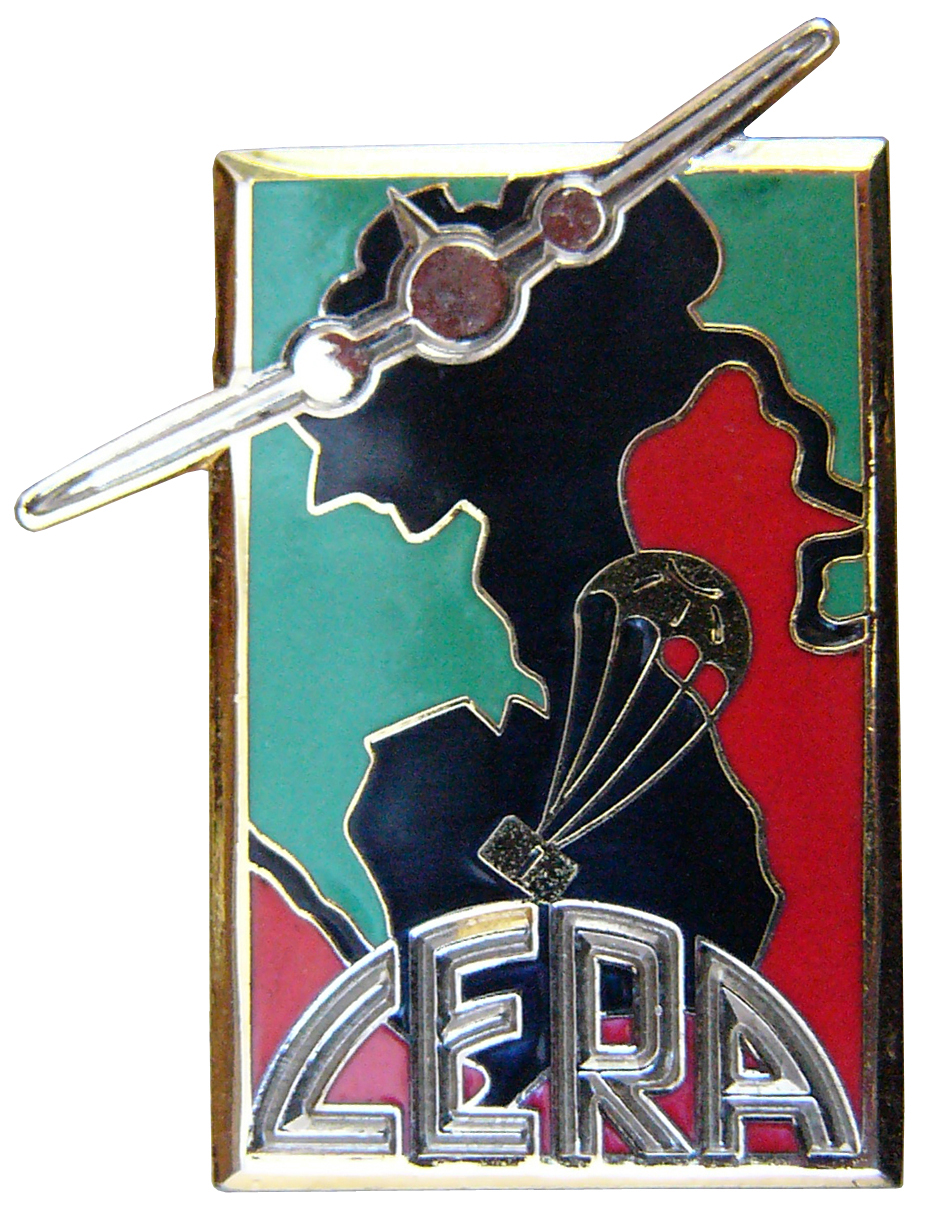
C.E.R.A

==== Parachute (Airborne) Commandos of the Foreign Legion ====
Parachute Commandos of the 11th Parachute Brigade (11^{e} BP) include:

- 2nd Foreign Parachute Regiment (2^{e} REP)
  - GCP Teams (Commando Parachute Group, French: Groupement des Commandos Parachutistes), these Airborne Commandos are elite operational pathfinder units specializing in Reconnaissance and Direct Action.

Parachute, Underwater Demolition and Diving Units of the 6th Light Armoured Brigade (French: 6^{e} Brigade Légère Blindée, 6^{e} BLB) include:

- 1st Foreign Engineer Regiment (1^{er} REG)
  - PCG Teams (Combat Engineer Divers, French: Plongeurs du Combat du Génie), former DINOPS Teams of Nautical Subaquatic Intervention Operational Detachment specialized in Parachute, Underwater Demolition and Diving.

Parachute, Underwater Demolition, Diving Units and Commandos of the 27th Mountain Infantry Brigade (27^{e} MIB) include:

- 2nd Foreign Engineer Regiment (2^{e} REG)
  - PCG Teams (Combat Engineer Divers, French: Plongeurs du Combat du Génie), former DINOPS Teams of Nautical Subaquatic Intervention Operational Detachment specialized in Parachute, Underwater Demolition and Diving.
  - Mountain Commando Groups (GCM)
27^{e} B.I.M

=== Troupes de marine ===
==== Marine Infantry Parachute Regiments ====
- 1st Marine Infantry Parachute Regiment (1^{re} CIA, 1^{re} CP, PPL, 1^{re} CCP, French SAS, 1^{er} BIA, 4^{e} BIA, 2^{e} RCP or 4th French SAS, 1^{er} BC.SAS, 1^{er} BP.SAS, 2^{e} BP.SAS, 1^{er} BPARA.SAS, 1^{er} BCCP, 1^{er} GCCP, 1^{er} BPC, 1^{re} D-B.P.SAS, D-B.CCP, D-B.CCP.SAS, 1^{re} DBCCP, 2^{e} DBCCP, B.P.Colonial BPC, BEPC, BP-OM, B.P.I.Ma, then 1^{er} R.P.I.Ma part of COS).
- 2nd Marine Infantry Parachute Regiment (2^{e} BCCP, 2^{e} B.P.Colonial 2^{e} BPC, 2nd Colonial Parachute Regiment 2^{e} RPC, then 2^{e} RPIMa).
- 3rd Marine Infantry Parachute Regiment (3^{e} BCCP, 3^{e} GCCP, 3^{e} BCCP, 3^{e} B.P.Colonial 3^{e} BPC, 3rd Colonial Parachute Regiment 3^{e} RPC, then 3^{e} RPIMa), (Commando Parachute Group Teams).
- (5th Marine Infantry Parachute Battalion (5^{e} BPIC, 5^{e} BCCP, 5^{e}BPC, 5^{e} BPIMa - dissolved).
- 6th Marine Infantry Parachute Regiment (6^{e} BCCP, 6^{e} GCCP, 6^{e}B.P.Colonial 6^{e} BPC, 6th Colonial Parachute Regiment 6^{e} RPC, then 6^{e} RPIMa - dissolved).
- 7th Marine Infantry Parachute Regiment) (7^{e} BCCP, 7^{e}GCCP, 7^{e} BCCP, 7^{e} BPC, 4^{e}BCCP, 7th Colonial Parachute Regiment 7^{e} RPC, 7^{e} RPIMa, then 7^{e} RPCS - dissolved).
- 8th Marine Infantry Parachute Regiment (8^{e} B.P.Colonial 8^{e} BPC, 8^{e} GCP, 8^{e} B.P.Choc 8^{e} BPC, 8th Colonial Parachute Regiment 8^{e} RPC, then 8^{e} RPIMa), (Commando Parachute Group Teams).

==== Battalions and Colonial Parachute Groups ====
- 1st Colonial Parachute Commando Battalion (1e BCCP, 1e GCCP, 1e BPC, then B.P.C.).
- 2nd Colonial Parachute Commando Battalion (2e BCCP, 2e GCCP, 2e BPC, then 2e RPC).
- 3rd Colonial Parachute Commando Battalion (3e BCCP, 3e BPC, then 3e RPC, 3e RPIMa).
- 4th Colonial Parachute Commando Battalion (4e BCCP - dissolved).
- 5th Colonial Parachute Infantry Battalion (5e BPIC - dissolved).
- 5th Colonial Parachute Commando Battalion (5e BCCP then 5^{e} BPC - dissolved).
- 6th Colonial Parachute Commando Battalion (6e régiment parachutiste d'infanterie de marine) (6^{e} BCCP, 6^{e} GCCP then 6^{e} BPC, then 6^{e} R.P.C - 6^{e} R.P.I.Ma).
- 7th Colonial Parachute Commando Battalion (7e BCCP, 7e GCCP then 7e BPC - dissolved).
- 8th Colonial Parachute Battalion (8^{e} Bataillon de Parachutistes Coloniaux) (8^{e} BPC, then 8^{e} R.P.C - 8^{e} R.P.I.Ma).
- 10th Colonial Parachute Battalion (10e BPC).
- Colonial Group Parachute Commando of Madagascar (GCCP Madagascar - dissolved).
- Colonial Group of Parachute Commandos of Afrique équatoriale française AEF (GCCP AEF - dissolved).
- Marine Infantry Parachute Company (CPIMA and 6^{e} CPIMa - dissolved).
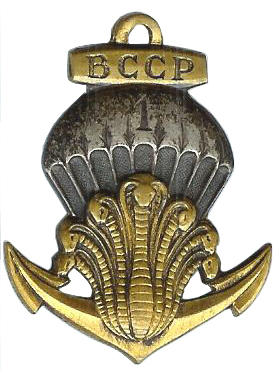
1^{er} B.C.C.P

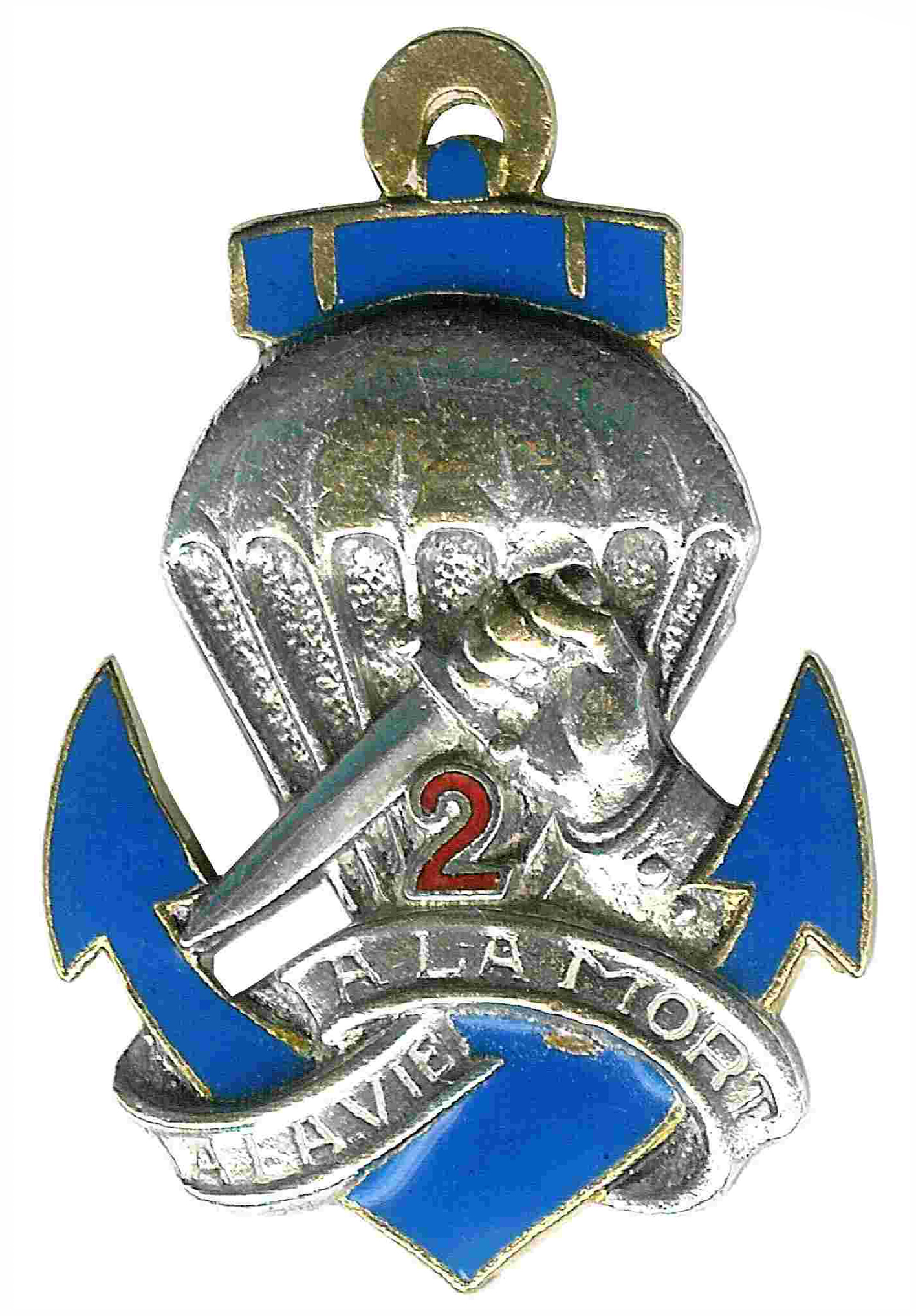
2^{e} B.C.C.P

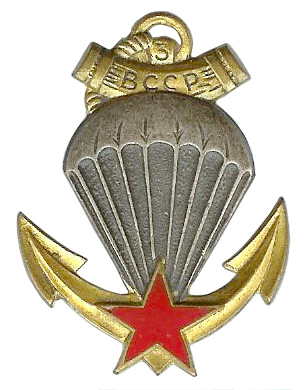
3^{e} B.C.C.P

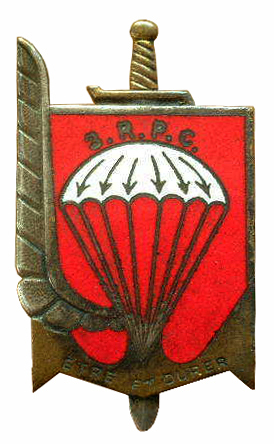
3^{e} R.P.C

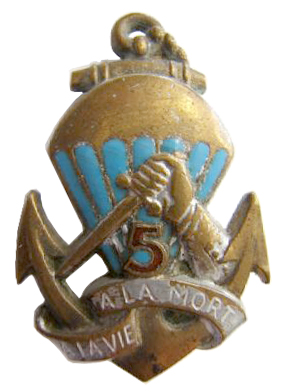
5^{e} B.P.I.C

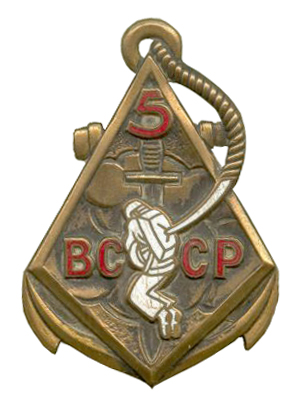
5^{e} B.C.C.P
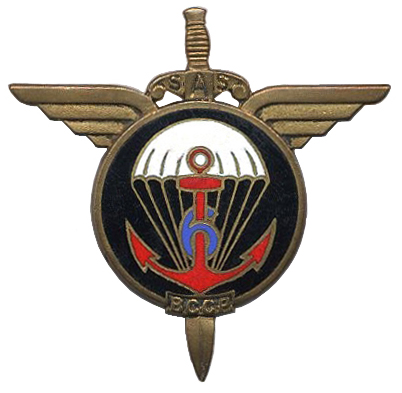
6^{e} B.C.C.P

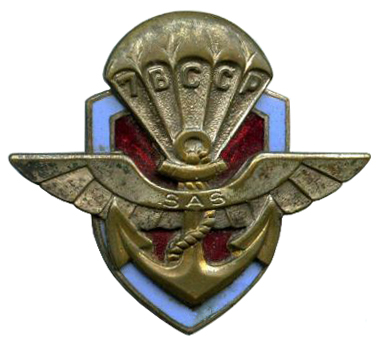
7^{e} B.C.C.P

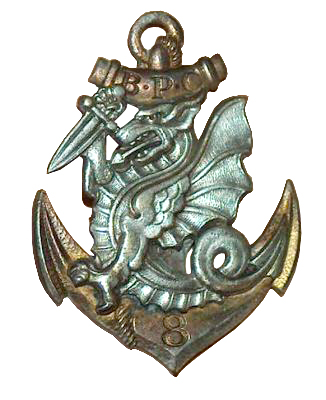
8^{e} B.P.C

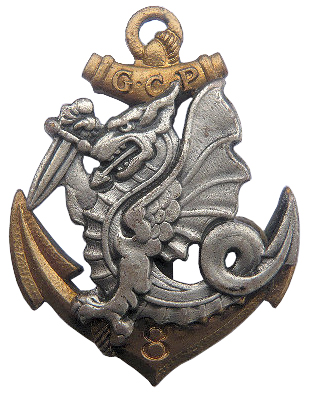
8^{e} G.C.P

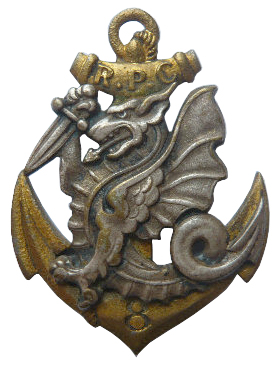
8^{e} R.P.C

=== Parachute Artillery ===
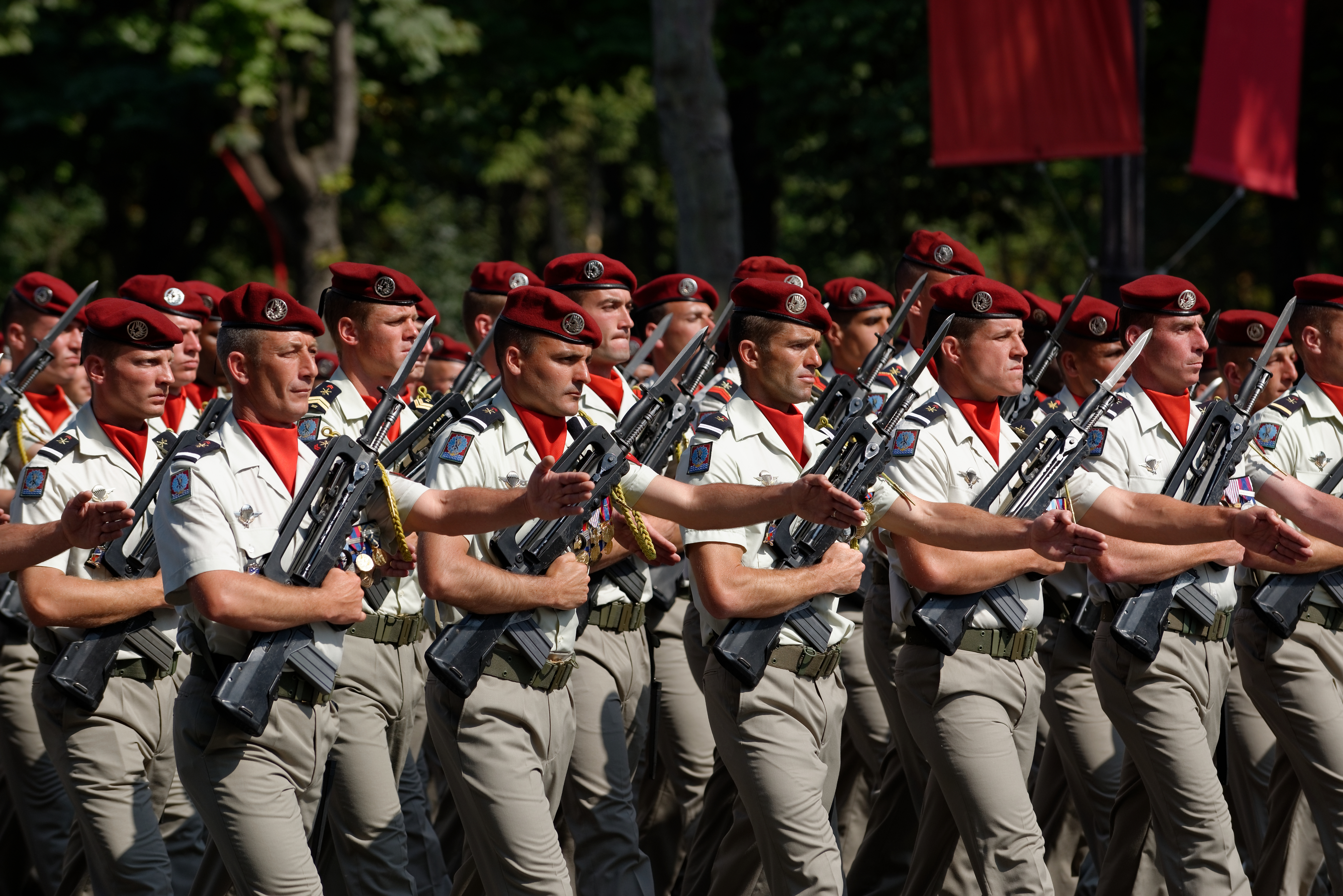
35th Parachute Artillery Regiment of the 11th Parachute Brigade marching on Bastille Day military parade, Paris.

- 5th Airborne Artillery Campaign Regiment (20^{e} RAP, 5^{e} RAP, 5^{e} RACAP - dissolved).
- 6th Light Parachute Artillery Regiment (6^{e} RALP - dissolved).
- 20th Light Parachute Artillery Regiment (20^{e} RALP - dissolved; then, 20th Parachute Group Artillery, 20^{e} GAP - dissolved).
- 35th Parachute Artillery Regiment (35e R.A., 35e RALP]], then 35e RAP]]), (Commando Parachute Group Teams).
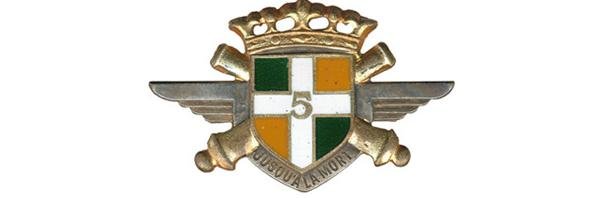
5^{e} R.A.C.A.P

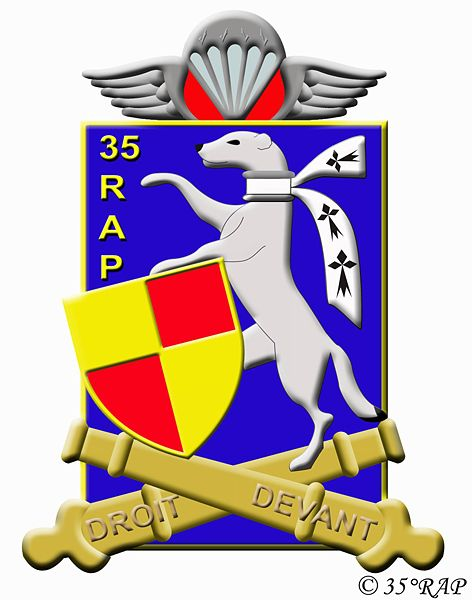
35^{e} R.A.P

=== Parachute Cavalry ===
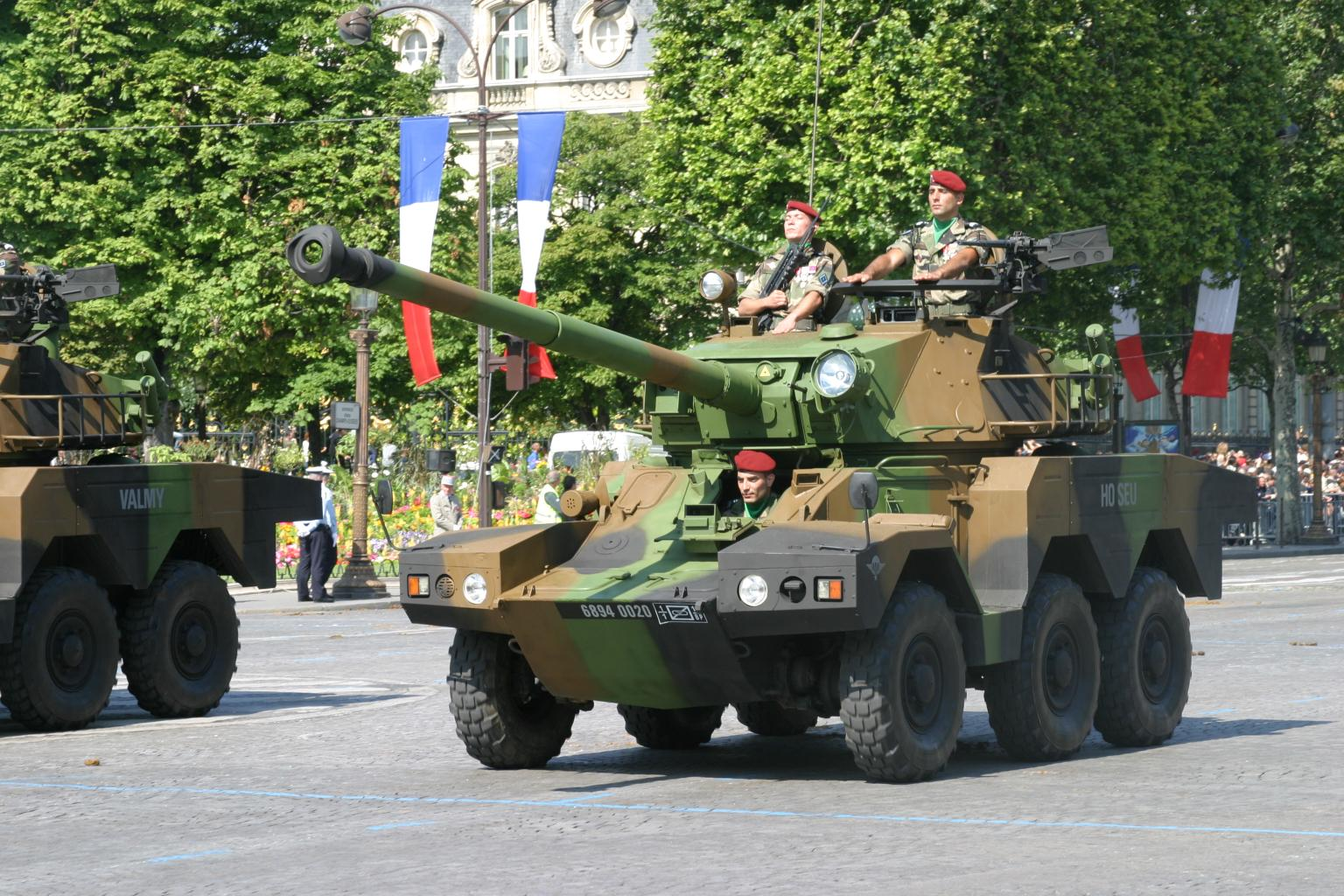
1st Parachute Hussar Regiment of the 11th Parachute Brigade, on Bastille Day, Paris.

- 1st Parachute Hussar Regiment (1^{er} RHP), (Commando Parachute Group Teams).
- 13th Parachute Dragoon Regiment (13^{e} RDP).
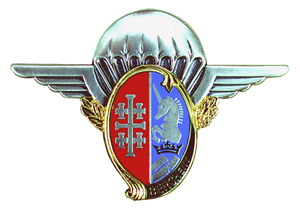
1^{er} R.H.P

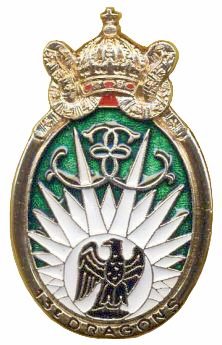
13^{e} R.D.P

=== Parachute Engineer ===
- 17th Parachute Engineer Battalion (17^{e} BGAP - dissolved).
- 61st and 71st Parachute Engineer Battalions of the Far East (Extrême-Orient) (61^{e} BG and 71^{e} BG - dissolved).
- 60th, 61st and 75th Parachute Engineer Companies (60^{e} CGAP, 61^{e} CGAP, 75^{e} CGAP - dissolved).
- 17th Parachute Engineer Regiment (17^{e} RGAP, then 17^{e} RGP), (Commando Parachute Group Teams).

=== Parachute Infantry ===
==== Patrol Chasseurs ====
- 5^{e} Bataillon de Chasseurs à Pied (5^{e} BCAP, 5th Patrol Chasseur Battalion - dissolved).
- 10^{e} Bataillon Parachutiste de Chasseurs à Pied) (10^{e} BPCP, 10th Patrol Chasseur Battalion - dissolved).
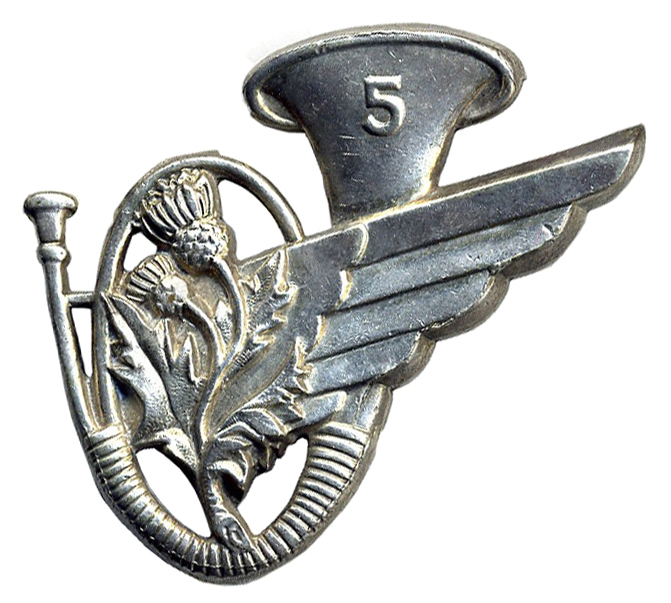
5^{e} B.C.A.P

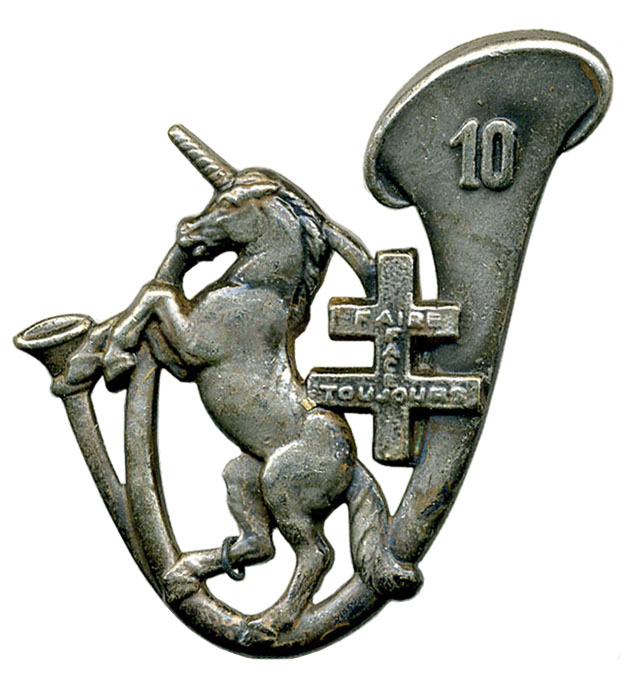
10^{e} B.P.C.P

==== Parachute Infantry ====
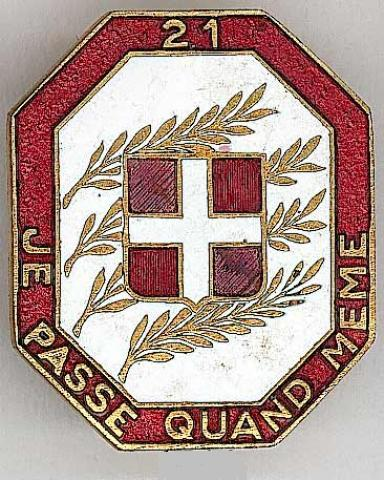
21^{e} R.I.A.P

- 18^{e} Régiment de Chasseurs Parachutistes (18^{e} RIPC, "18th Parachute Infantry Regiment" - dissolved).
- 21^{e} Régiment d'Infanterie (21^{e} RIAP, " 21st Parachute Infantry Regiment " - dissolved).

==== Parachute Chasseurs ====
- 1st Parachute Chasseur Regiment / 1st Air Infantry Battalion (French: 1^{e} Régiment de Chasseurs Parachutistes) (601^{e} G.I.A, 602^{e} G.I.A, 1^{re} C.I.A, 1^{er} BCP, then 1^{er} RCP), ( Commando Parachute Group Teams).
- 2nd Parachute Chasseur Regiment/4th Air Infantry Battalion (French: 2^{e} Régiment de Chasseurs Parachutistes) (4^{e} BIA, 2^{e} RCP SAS, then 1^{er} RPIMa French); also known as 4th Special Air Service of British Army and assigned to Special Air Service Troops).
- 3rd Parachute Chasseur Regiment /3rd Air Infantry Battalion (French: 3^{e} Régiment de Chasseurs Parachutistes) (3^{e} BIA, 3^{e} RCP, 2^{e} RCP SAS, then 1^{er} RPIMa French); also known as 3rd Special Air Service of British Army and was assigned to Special Air Service Troops).
- 4th Parachute Chasseur Regiment (French: 4^{e} Régiment de Chasseurs Parachutistes), (4^{e} RCP - dissolved).
- 5th Parachute Chasseur Regiment (French: 5^{e} Régiment de Chasseurs Parachutistes), (5^{e} RCP - dissolved).
- 9th Parachute Chasseur Regiment (French: 9^{e} Régiment de Chasseurs Parachutistes), (9^{e} RCP, merged with 1^{er} RCP).
- 14^{e} Régiment de Chasseurs Parachutistes ('14th Parachute Chasseur Regiment' (14^{e} RCP - dissolved).
- 18^{e} Régiment de Chasseurs Parachutistes ("18th Parachute Chasseur Regiment") (18^{e} RCP - dissolved).
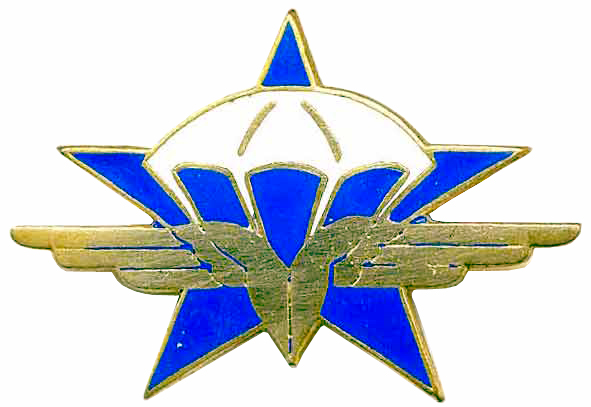
1^{er} R.C.P

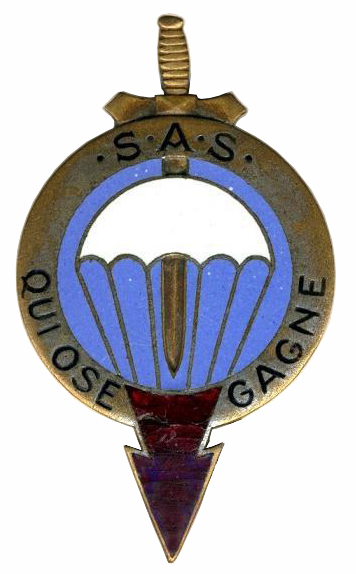
Insignia of the 2^{e} R.C.P, 1^{er} B.C.C.P-SAS and 1^{er} B.P.C

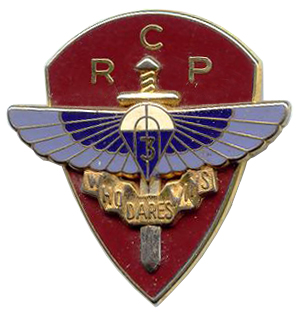
3^{e} R.C.P (former 3rd French Special Air Service when it served in the British Army).

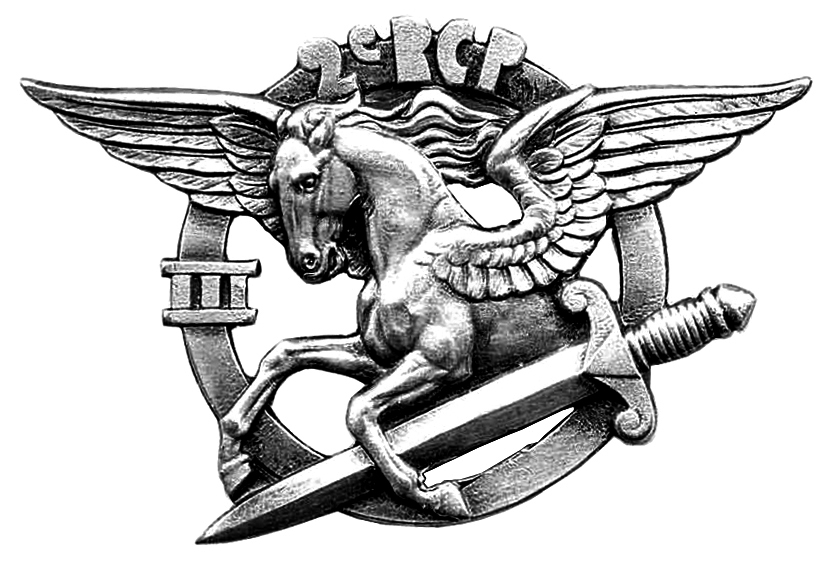
3^{e} Bataillon du 2^{e} R.C.P (former 4th French Special Air Service).

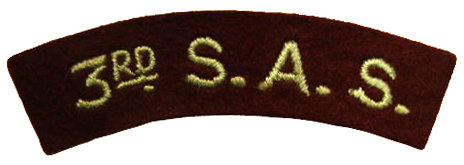
Arm patch of the 3rd French Special Air Service when it served in the British Army, now 3^{e} R.C.P.

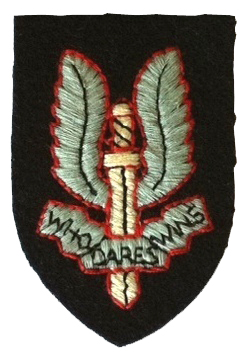
3rd (3^{e} R.C.P) and 4th (2^{e} R.C.P) French Special Air Service beret badge when it was part of the British army.
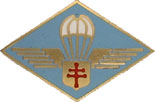
Para Chasseur Company of Free French Forces (F.F.L)

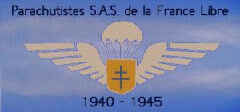
F.F.L.-SAS reserved for SAS paratroopers of Free France 1940-1945

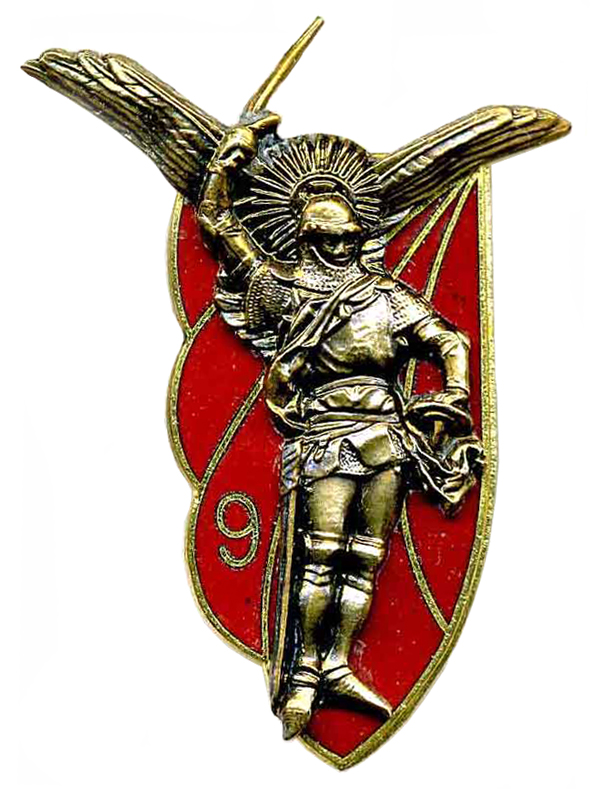
9^{e} R.C.P

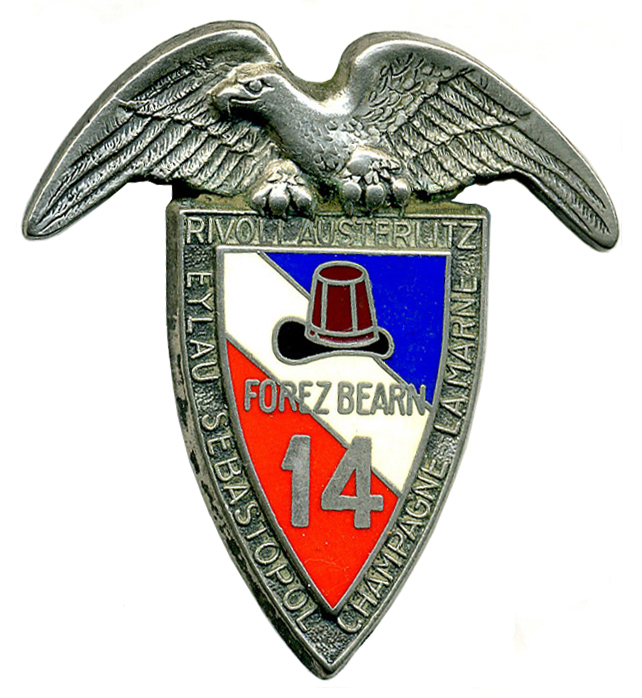
14^{e} R.C.P

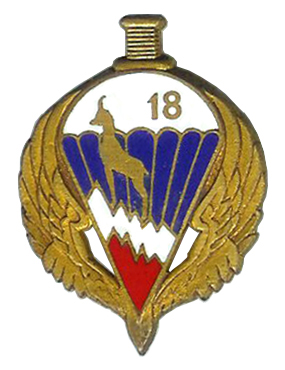
18^{e} R.C.P

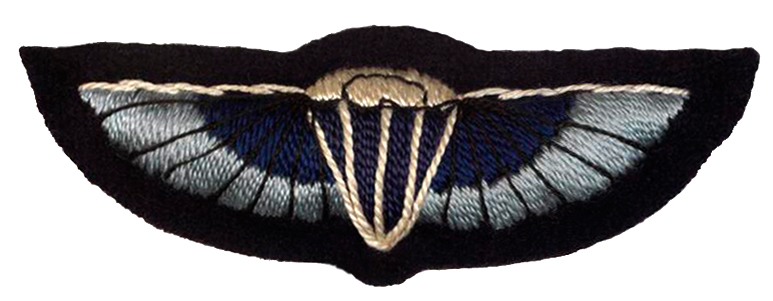
SAS Operational Wings

==== Shock Paratroopers ====
- 1st Shock Battalion (French: 1^{er} Bataillon de Choc) (1^{er} BC - dissolved).
- 2nd Shock Battalion/ Bataillon Janson-de-Sailly or Bataillon Gayardon 2e bataillon de choc (2^{e} BC - dissolved).
- 3rd Shock Battalion / Commando Group of France Commandos de France (3^{e} BC - dissolved).
- 4th Shock Battalion / Commando de Cluny (4^{e} BC - dissolved).
- 5th Shock Battalion / Commandos d'Afrique (5^{e} BC - dissolved).
- 6th Shock Battalion / Commandos de Provence (6^{e} BC - dissolved).
- 1st Parachute Shock Battalion 1er bataillon parachutistes de choc (1^{er} BPC - dissolved).
- 2nd Parachute Shock Battalion 2e bataillon parachutiste de choc (2^{e} BPC - dissolved).
- 1st Shock Parachute Infantry Regiment 1er régiment d'infanterie de choc aéroporté(1^{er} RICAP - dissolved).
- 11th Shock Parachute Regiment 11e régiment parachutiste de choc (11^{e} BPC, 11^{e} DBPC and 11^{e} RPC - dissolved).
- 12th Shock Parachute Battalion 12e bataillon parachutiste de choc (12^{e} BPC - dissolved).
- Mixed Airborne Commando Groupment Groupement de commandos mixtes aéroportés (G.C.M.A - dissolved).
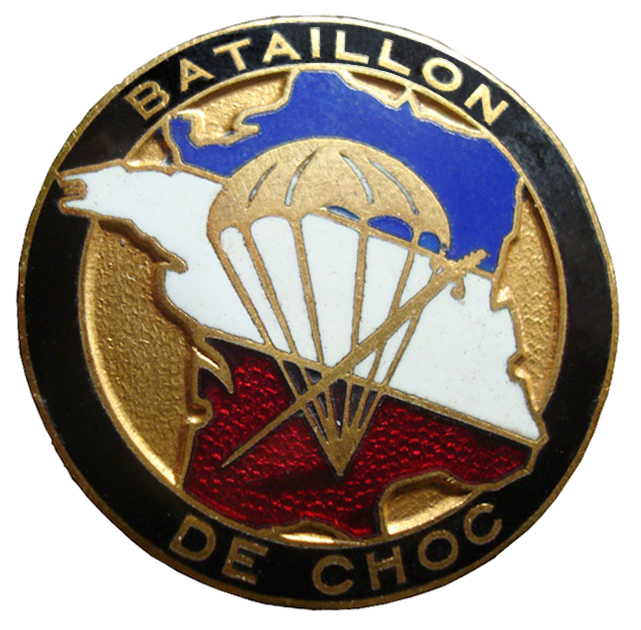
1^{er} B.C

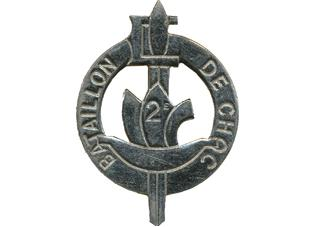
2^{e} B.C

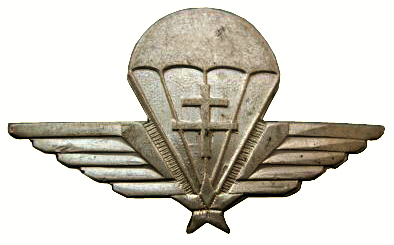
3^{e} B.C

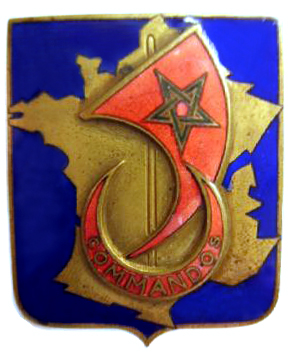
5^{e} B.C
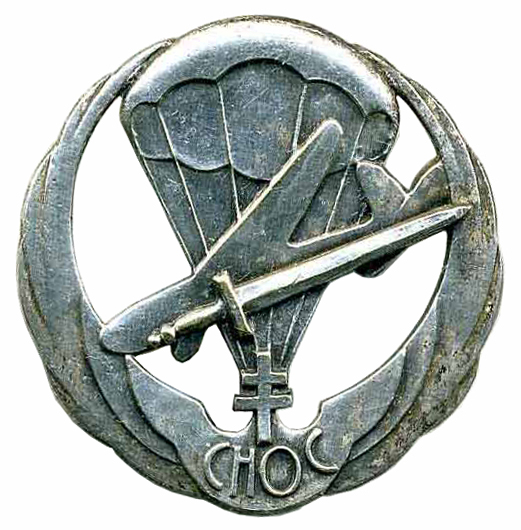
2^{e} B.P.C

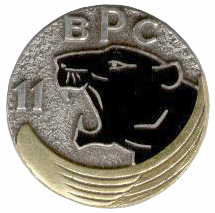
11^{e} B.P.C

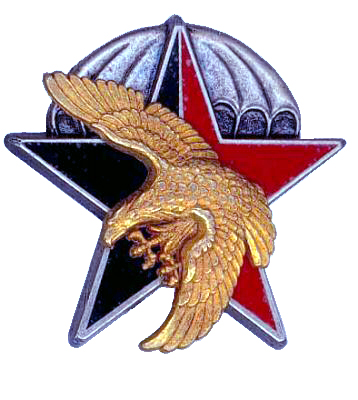
12^{e} B.P.C

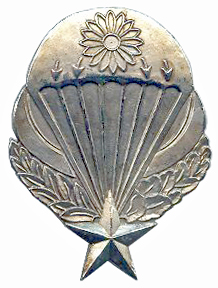
G.C.M.A

=== French Train Parachute Regiments ===
==== Parachute Companies and Regiments ====
- Air Support Companies (CRA).
- Air Delivery Regiment (RLA - dissolved).
- 1st Train Parachute Regiment (French: 1^{er} Régiment du Train Parachutiste) (1^{er} RTP).

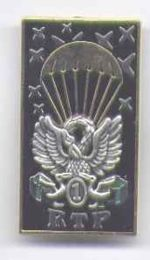

==== Airborne Bases ====
- Northern Airborne Base (French: Base Aéroportée Nord) (B.AP.N - dissolved).
- Southern Airborne Base (French: Bases Aéroportée Sud) (B.AP.S - dissolved).
- North African Airborne Base (French: Base Aéroportée d'Afrique du Nord) (B.AP/AF.N - dissolved).
- Airborne Operational Mobile Base (B.O.M.AP).
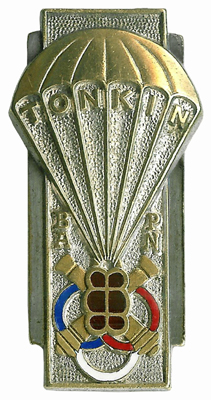
B.AP.N

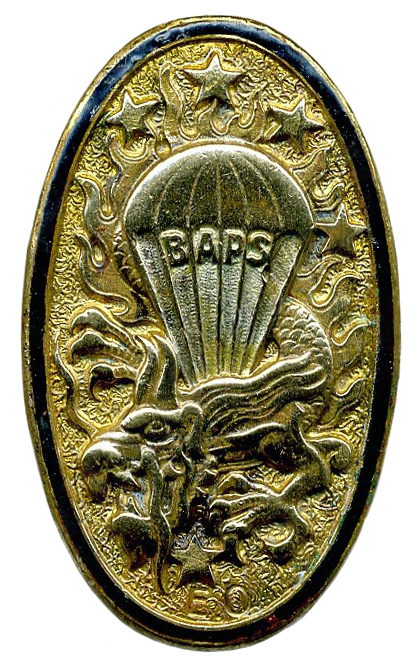
B.AP.S

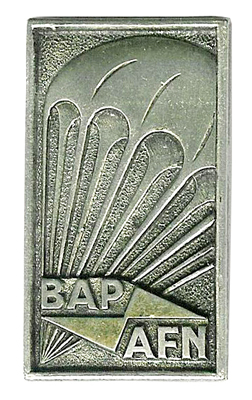
B.AP/AF.N

=== Parachute Command and Support ===
- 14th Parachute Logistic and Support Regiment (French: 14^{e} Régiment d'Infanterie et de Soutien Logistique Parachutiste) (14^{e} RISLP) - former 14th Parachute Command and Support Regiment.
- 7th Parachute Command and Support Regiment (French: 7^{e} Régiment Parachutiste de Commandement et de Soutien) (7^{e} RPCS - dissolved).
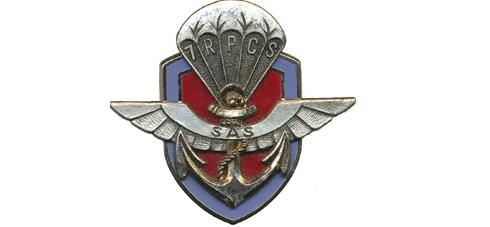
7^{e} R.P.C.S

=== Matériel ===
- 3rd Matériel Regiment (French: 3^{e} Régiment du Matériel) (3^{e} RMAT).

=== Vietnamese, Laotien and Cambodian Parachute Units ===
- 1st Vietnamese Parachute Battalion (French: 1^{er} Bataillon de Parachutistes Vietnamiens) (1^{er} BPVN - dissolved).
- 3rd Vietnamese Parachute Battalion (French: 3^{e} Bataillon de Parachutistes Vietnamiens) (3^{e} BPVN - dissolved).
- 5th Vietnamese Parachute Battalion (French: 5^{e} Bataillon de Parachutistes Vietnamiens) (5^{e} BPVN - dissolved).
- 6th Vietnamese Parachute Battalion (dissolved).
- 7th Vietnamese Parachute Battalion (dissolved).
- 1st Khmer Parachute Battalion (created on December 1, 1952 in Cambodia).
- 1st Laotian Parachute Battalion (created on October 1, 1951 in Vientiane, Laos).

=== Algerian Parachute Units ===
- 19th Algerian Parachute Battalion
- 14th Algerian Parachute Tirailleur Brigade

== French Air and Space Force ==
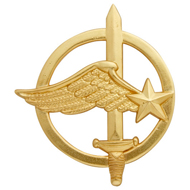

Past and present Fusiliers Commandos de l'Air units have included:

- 601st Airborne Infantry Group (601e G.I.A, 1e CIA, 1e BCP, then 1st Parachute Chasseur Regiment (1e RCP)).
- 602nd Airborne Infantry Group (602e G.I.A, 1e CIA, 1e BCP, then 1e RCP).
- Air Marching Infantry Company (CIAM), 1e RCP.
- 1st Air Infantry Company (1er CIA, 1er BCP, then 1er RCP).
- 1st Parachute Chasseur Regiment (1er RCP of the French Air Force transferred to the French Army).
- Air Force Security and Intervention Forces Brigade (France)
  - Air Parachute Commando n° 10, C.P.A. 10, part of Special Operations Command (France) (COS).
  - Air Parachute Commando n° 20, C.P.A. 20
  - Air Parachute Commando n° 30, C.P.A. 30
  - Protection Squadrons (Escadron de protection).

== French Navy ==
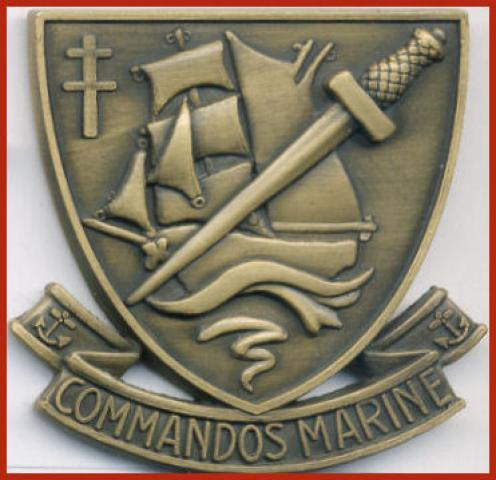

Naval Fusiliers and Commandos include the following Forces Fusiliers Marins and Commandos Marine FORFUSCO

- Aeronautical Naval Parachute Commando (dissolved).
- Commando Ponchardier (French: Commando Ponchardier) (SAS B).
- Commando Hubert (French: Commando Hubert) (part of Special Operations Command (COS).
- Fusiliers Marins Commandos Group (GROUFUMACO - dissolved).
- Commando François (dissolved).
- Commando de Penfentenyo (French: Commando de Penfentenyo) (part of COS).
- Commando Jaubert (French: Commando Jaubert) (part of COS).
- Commando de Montfort (French: Commando de Montfort) (part of COS).
- Commando Trépel (French: Commando Trépel) (part of COS).
- Naval Fusiliers Instruction Center. École des fusiliers marins (ECOFUS)
- Naval Fusiliers and Commando Base (BASEFUSCO).
- Commando Kieffer (French: Commando Kieffer) (part of COS).

== National Gendarmerie ==
Paratroopers of the National Gendarmerie include:

- National Gendarmerie Parachute Intervention Squadron (EPIGN), part of the National Gendarmerie Intervention Group (French: Groupe d'intervention de la Gendarmerie nationale), the GIGN.

== Medics ==
Combat medics in the French Armed Forces are part of the French Defence Health Service. Each French regiment, battalion, company and unit has its own specialized combat medics, with ranks designating various unit level sizes.

For French Regiments engaged in combat, the leading Medical leadership would be a colonel or Lieutenant-colonel and can also be designated as Parachute Medical-Colonel of the Army (French: Médecin-Colonel Parachutiste de l'Armée).

For Foreign Legion Regiments, Medics can be French and Legionnaires, while the leading Medical leadership would be a Colonel or Lieutenant-colonel and can also be designated as Foreign Parachute Medical-Colonel (French: Médecin-Chef Parachutiste des Régiments, Bataillons et Compagnies Etranger de Parachutistes).

== See also ==
- Special Operations Command (French: Commandement des Opérations Spéciales (COS))
- Direction générale de la Gendarmerie Nationale (French: Direction Générale de la Gendarmerie nationale (DGGN)) in liaison
- Parachutist badge
- School of Airborne Troops (France)
- List of paratrooper forces
