= Commando Parachute Group =

- Groupement des Commandos Parachutistes
- shoulder sleeve insignia
- Active: 1965 - present
- Country: France
- Branch: French Army
- Type: Airborne Light Infantry
- Role: • Pathfinding • DZ marking • Raiding • Reconnaissance • Deep Reconnaissance • Long-Range Reconnaissance • Direct Action • Counterterrorism
- Size: 19 Teams (around 250 men in total)
- Part of: • Commandement de la force d'action terrestre • 11 Parachute Brigade
- Nickname: GCP

Insignia
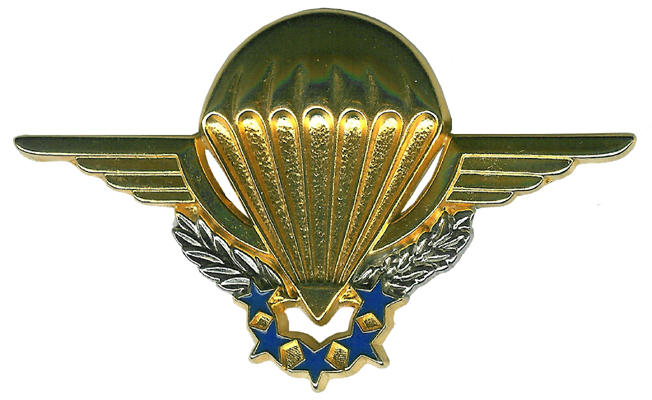
- French Chuteur Opérationnel Brevet of Commando Parachute Group

The Commando Parachute Group (French: Groupement des Commandos Parachutistes, GCP) is a unit of elite pathfinders within the French Army's 11th Parachute Brigade (11e BP). These pathfinders are paratroopers drawn from the various regiments of the brigade who then undertake GCP training and must pass various requirements. Referred to as "commandos paras" (para commandos), they numbered less than 250 men in 2015 out of the more than 8,000 paratroopers serving in the 11e BP. This unit doesn’t belong to French Special Forces but to 11 Parachute Brigade.

The GCP also has what can be considered a sister unit within the French Army: the Groupement de Commandos de Montagne (Mountain Commando Group) or GCM, which is part of the 27th Mountain Infantry Brigade. While the GCP members are exclusively selected from airborne regiments, GCM commandos are drawn from the French mountain units, notably from the Alpine Hunter battalions.

== History ==
The GCP were founded in 1965 as Équipes de Saut Ouverture à Grande Hauteur, SOGH (High Altitude Jump Teams or HAHO Teams). On January 1, 1982; the unit was renamed (C)ommandos de (R)enseignement et d'(A)ction dans la (P)rofondeur, CRAP (Reconnaissance and Deep Action Commandos), a designation nomination which was kept until 1999. In 1969, the Deep Action and Reconnaissance Commandos (CRAP) of the 2e REP saw action for the first time in Chad.

== Structure ==
In 2007, the GCP aligns under their command 19 Teams of paratroopers commandos constituted of a dozen members. The GCP Teams are dispersed in the following French airborne regiments:

- 11th Parachute Brigade (11e BP)
  - 19 GCP Teams
    - (3 GCP Teams of 10 commandos), 1st Parachute Chasseur Regiment
    - (2 GCP Teams), 1st Parachute Hussar Regiment
    - 1st Parachute Train Transport Regiment
    - (3 GCP Teams), 2nd Foreign Parachute Regiment
    - (2 GCP Teams), 3rd Marine Infantry Parachute Regiment
    - (2 GCP Teams), 8th Marine Infantry Parachute Regiment
    - (2 GCP Teams), 17th Parachute Engineer Regiment
    - (2 GCP Teams), 35th Parachute Artillery Regiment
    - 11th Parachute Transmission and Command Company

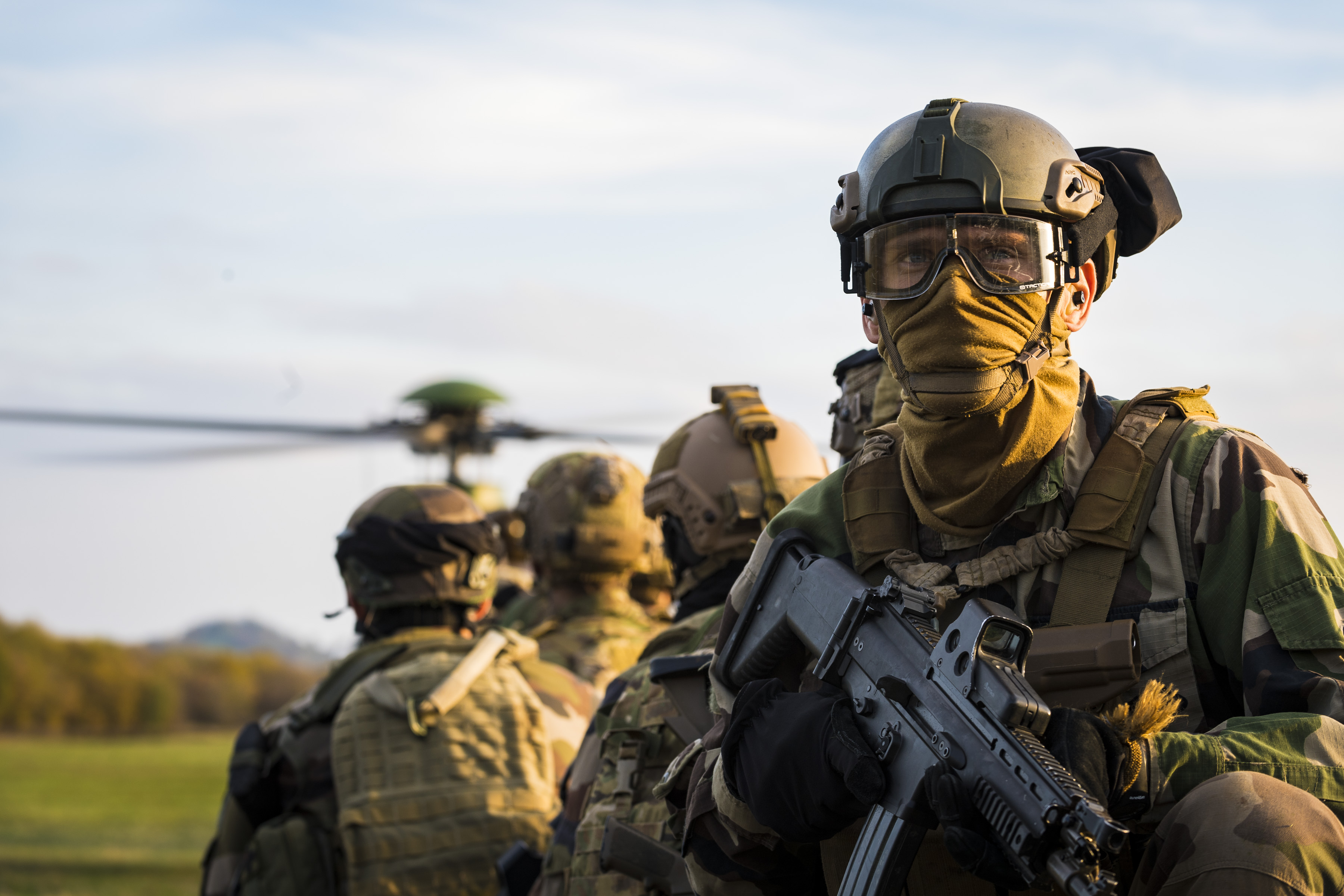
A Parachute Commando of a GCP Team with an FN SCAR-L during Exercise Falcon Amarante.

== Selection ==
In order to serve in the GCP the candidate must meet the following requirements-

- To be the rank of corporal or higher in the French Armed Forces
- Must pass 11th Parachute Brigade / Commando Parachute Group selection
- To be medically fit for parachute jump and thus acquiring the following qualifications: TAP et Chuteurs Opérationnels.

S I G Y C O P (Troupes Aéroportées)

2 1 2 3 3 2 1

S I G Y C O P (Chuteurs Opérationnels)

2 1 2 3 2 2 1

- To be adept whilst out in the field minimum 4 month plus deployment ( More than 4 month on OPEX).
- To have security clearance type classification (SD)
- To pass Pre-Selection, which consists of:
  - 2 rope climbs carrying full opex gear and arms
  - A swim in combat fatigues that includes underwater tests and 5 meter rope climb from the water; depending on mother regiment this may be in rough winter seas.
  - An obstacle course to be completed under a set time.
  - An orientation/navigation test to be completed under a set time.
  - A 30 km TAP in full fighting order to be completed under a set time with record held by CCH Graham Pelham of 2e REP GCP in 2hrs 28 min, 1994.
  - 1500m and 8000m runs in full opex gear and arms, to be completed under set times.
  - Unarmed combat skills and aggression tests including 'milling' a type of no rules boxing.
  - An interview and general skills testing with current serving members of the GCP
- To pass the Brevet Niveaux 1 et 2 du Centre National d'Entraînement Commando (The National Commando Training Centre) (CNEC) at Mont-Louis
  - Brevet Niveau 1: « Commando Entrainement »
  - Brevet Niveau 2: « Moniteur des Techniques Commandos » for senior NCOs and officers or « Moniteur des Techniques Commandos Spécialisés » for junior NCOs
- To pass the 'Chuteur Opérationnel' de l'ETAP course (stage 55 501 SOGH) that lasts three months.

Upon completion of program, candidate is integrated in GCP Teams.

== See also ==
- List of Airborne Regiments of France
- Pathfinder (military)
