= 19th Algerian Parachute Battalion =

The 19th Algerian Parachute Battalion (Fr: 19e bataillon de parachutistes algériens) was a French paratroop battalion formed in French Algeria in 1950. The battalion was disbanded in 1956.
