= 25th Airborne Division =

- 25^{e} Division Aéroportée
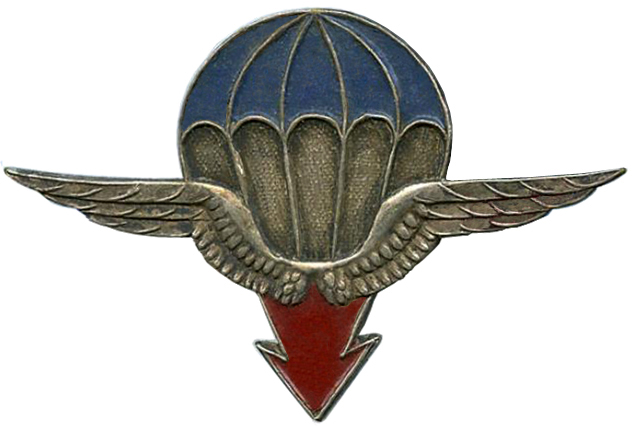
- Division insignia
- Active: 1946–1948
- Country: France
- Branch: French Army
- Type: Airbrone Division
- Role: Airborne Infantry

Commanders
- Notable commanders: Général Bonjour; Général Demetz

The 25th Airborne Division (French: 25^{e} Division Aéroportée (25^{e} D.A.P)) was an airborne unit of the French Army. Constituted at the end of 1945, the division was created on February 1, 1946 and was dissolved during the Indochina War in June 1948; it did not serve in Indochina as an entire division.

== History ==
Following the end of World War II, France planned to create two Airborne Divisions, organized similarly to United States airborne formations. The first to be created, the 24th Airborne Division, was dissolved after only three months due to a chronic lack of troops. The infantry of the 24th DAP and its 24th CEP were transferred to the 25th Motorized Infantry Division, which was used to form the 25th Airborne Division on February 1, 1946. The new division was formed in southwest France with its headquarters at Bayonne.

From its creation, it suffered from shortcomings in manpower and equipment – for air transport, the division had only the Junkers Ju 52, Douglas C-47 Dakota, and the SNCASE SE.161 Languedoc, the last intended for towing gliders because it was not suitable for airborne troops.

The troops of the division included units that had fought in World War II – the 1st Parachute Chasseur Regiment (RCP), the 2nd Parachute Chasseur Regiment, which had just merged with the 3rd Parachute Chasseur Regiment and the 4th R.I.A. S.A.S., and the 1st Choc Airborne Infantry Regiment (RICAP), made up of the combined shock units of the 1st Army.

In order to strengthen French control in Algeria and prevent an uprising, the 25th Division was transferred there in April 1946. The division headquarters was in Algiers and then Philippeville, the 1st RCP in the Sétif area, the 2nd RCP in the Constantine area between Philippeville, Bone, and Guelma, and the 1st RICAP near Algiers.

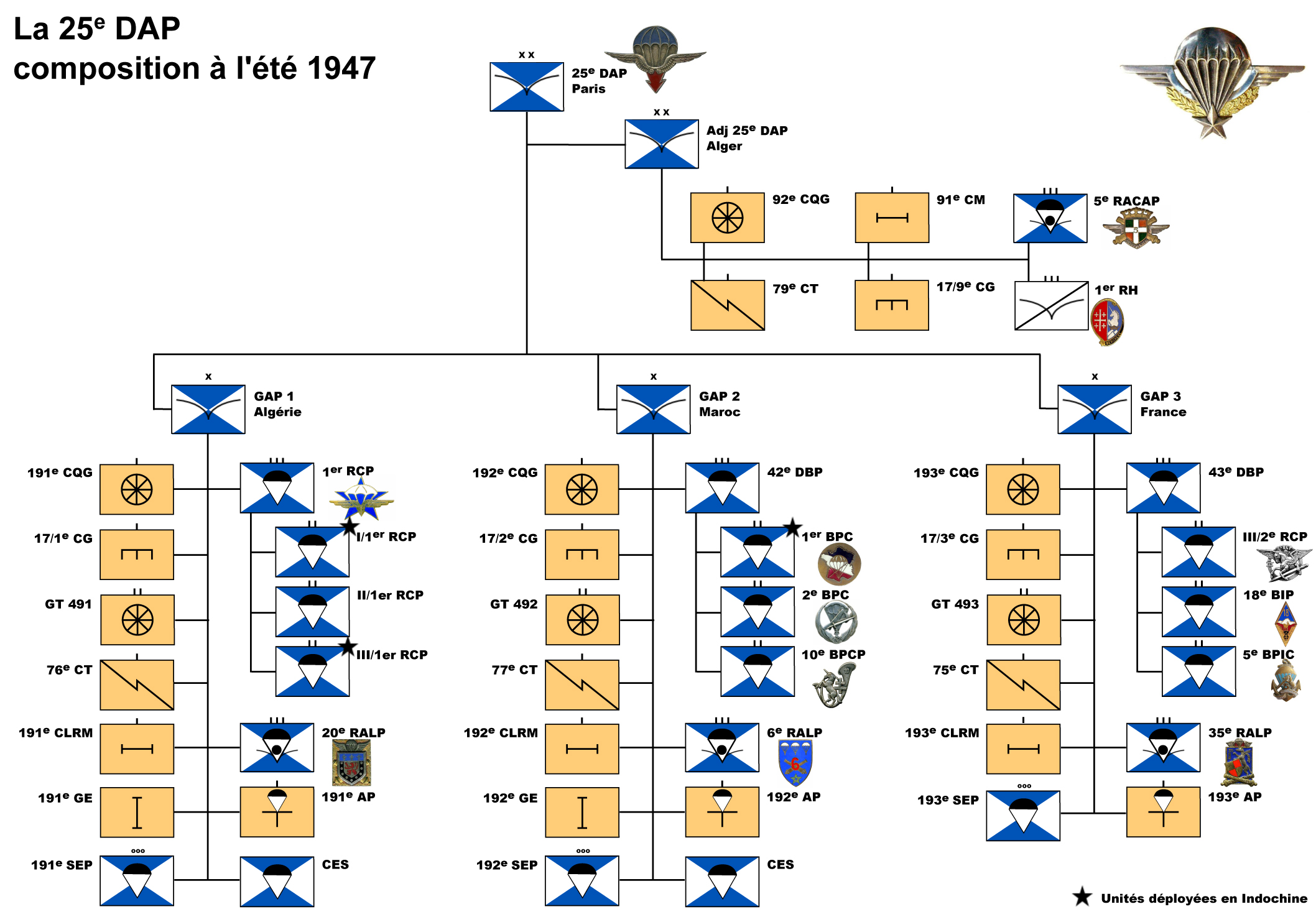
Structure of the 25th Airborne Division, 1947

Unable to develop as planned, it was reorganized multiple times, first in September 1946, when its structure was revised to include three Independent Airborne Groups (GAP). GAPs 1 and 2 were combat units, while GAP 3 would become responsible for training in France. GAP 1 was located around Constantine, GAP 2 in Morocco, and GAP 3 would form during 1947 in the 5th Military Region in France. The division headquarters was relocated to Pau while a deputy in North Africa was appointed. The division commander took command of the Airborne Troops Training Center in Pau, but this arrangement was brief, as in November the training center and the 11th Choc Battalion were attached to the inspector of the Airborne Troops in Paris.

The unit was reorganized a final time in February 1947 to prepare for the formation of GAP 3 and the detachment of elements to the intensifying Indochina War. The 1st RCP formed the infantry of GAP 1, although two of its battalions had already been deployed to Indochina, the 42nd Demi-Brigade formed that of GAP 2, and GAP 3 was formed later that year from the 18th BIP, the 3rd Battalion of the 2nd RCP, and the 5th BPIC, which were part of its subordinate 43rd Demi-Brigade.

During these tenures, other constitutions witnessed formations. The 1st Parachute Chasseur Regiment, 2nd Parachute Chasseur Regiment and 1st Choc Airborne Infantry Regiment 1^{er} R.I.C.A.P formed in 1946, the S.A.S Parachute Demi-Brigade.

As a result of the number of men sent to reinforce the forces in Indochina with the demi-brigade of colonial parachute commandos on 1 October 1947, the 25th Airborne Division and GAP 2 were dissolved in June 1948.

== Commanders ==
- 1945–1946 : général Bonjour
- 1946–1948 : général Demetz

== Subordinate units ==
- Adjoint : général Lecoq
- G.A.P 1 : commandant Noiret
- G.A.P 2 : colonel Brissaut-Demaillet
- G.A.P 3 : lieutenant-colonel Bastiani
- 42^{e} Demi-Brigade : colonel Vergoz
- 43^{e} Demi-Brigade : colonel Ailleret

== See also ==
- Moroccan Division
- Jean de Lattre de Tassigny
- List of French paratrooper units
