= Algerian War order of battle: France =

The units and formations of the French Army which fought in the Algerian War changed over time.

The Algiers Division, Oran Division and Constantine Divisions were all retitled military divisions (or divisions militaires) on 17 March 1956. On March 8, 1957 all three divisions were upgraded to Army Corps (CA) with twelve sub-areas. They were again redesignated as territorial regions/army corps (regions territoriales et Corps d’Armees) in April 1959. After 1962 they were reduced solely to the functions of army corps once more, and then returned again to divisional status only.

Schrader lists as the divisions of the General Reserve the 10th and 25th Parachute Divisions at Algiers and Philippeville, and the 11th Infantry Division (France) at Bône. RT/CAO, the Oran Corps Area, with its headquarters at Oran, comprised the 5th Armoured Division (Mostaganem, North), 4th DIM (Tiaret, East Oran Zone), and 12th (Tlemcen, West Oran Zone), 13th (Mecheria, South Oran) and 29th Infantry Divisions (Sidi-bel-Abbes, Central Oran Zone) Infantry Divisions, plus the 102nd Light Aviation Group (102e GALAT) also at Sidi-bel-Abbes. RT/CAA, the Algiers Corps Area, comprised the 27th DIA (Tizi-Ouzou), and 9th and 20th Infantry Divisions (Orléansville and Médéa), East, West, and South Zones, with the 105th and 114th Army Light Aviation Groups. The Constantine Army Corps (RT/CAC) had five divisions: 2 DIM Bone, 7e Division Mechanique Rapide Tebessa, 14 & 19 DI respectively at Constantine and Setif, and the 21st Algerian Infantry Division at Batna. Also two GALATs.

In 1962, the French Army forces in Algeria were being supervised by the Commandement Supérieur des Forces Armées en Algérie with the Constantine, Algiers, and Oran Zones supervised by the 22nd, 23rd, and 24th Army Corps respectively.

On 1 July 1964, the Commandement supérieur des forces armées en Algérie (Superior Command of the Armed Forces in Algeria) was officially disestablished.

This Kim Kanger sourced listing below is as of 1961.

== Oran Zone 1961 ==
Zone	Division	Regiments and Others
West Oran zone	12th Infantry Division	Mechanized Infantry Regiment; 2nd African Chasseur Regiment; 3rd Armored Regiment; 5th Infantry Regiment; 7th Infantry Regiment; 22nd Marine Infantry Regiment; 1st Marine Rifles Half-Brigade; 4th/10th Marine Artillery Regiment; 2nd/66th Artillery Regiment; 2nd/403rd Artillery Regiment
North Oran zone	5th Armored Division	1st Armored Regiment; 6th African Chasseur Regiment; 19th Chasseur Battalion; 20th Chasseur Battalion; 21st Algerian Rifles Regiment; 1st/64th Artillery Regiment; 2nd/64th Artillery Regiment
Central Oran zone	29th Infantry Division	9th Hussar Regiment; 1st Foreign Legion Infantry Regiment; 2nd Algerian Rifles Regiment; 2nd Zouave Regiment; 21st Infantry Regiment; 1st/27th Artillery Regiment
East Oran zone	4th Motorized Infantry Division	10th Dragoon Regiment; 9th Spahi Regiment; 1st Motorized Infantry Regiment; 110th Infantry Regiment; 4th Alpine Chasseur Battalion; 31st Alpine Chasseur Battalion; 4th/12th Artillery Regiment; 1st/403rd Artillery Regiment
South Oran zone	13th Infantry Division	1st Light Armored Regiment; 2nd Spahi Regiment; 23rd Spahi Regiment; 2nd Foreign Legion Infantry Regiment; 8th Marine Infantry Regiment; 9th Marine Infantry Regiment; 1st/17th Artillery Regiment

== Constantine Zone 1961 ==
Zone	Division	Regiments and Others
North Constantine zone	14th Infantry Division	6th Armored Regiment; 18th Dragoon Regiment; 21st Spahi Regiment; 4th Marine Infantry Regiment; 16th Marine Infantry Regiment; 55th Marine Infantry Regiment; 75th Marine Infantry Regiment; 23rd Infantry Regiment; 51st Infantry Regiment; 43rd Marine Infantry Battalion; 81st Alpine Infantry Regiment; 120th Alpine Infantry Regiment; Regiment de Coree; 2nd/4th Artillery Regiment; 1st/67th Artillery Regiment; 3rd/6th Artillery Regiment; 1st/406th Artillery Regiment; 4th/10th Marine Artillery Regiment
South East Constantine zone	7th Mechanized Division	2nd Dragoon Regiment; 3rd African Chasseur Regiment; 4th Light Armored Regiment; 21st Marine Infantry Regiment; 26th Motorized Infantry Regiment; 60th Infantry Regiment; 1st/39th Artillery Regiment; 1st/59th Artillery Regiment; 72nd Artillery Group; 457th Artillery Group
North East Constantine zone	2nd Motorized Infantry Division	1st Spahi Regiment; 8th Spahi Regiment; 4th Hussar Regiment; 29th Dragoon Regiment; 4th Foreign Legion Infantry Regiment; 12th African Chasseur Battalion; 14th African Chasseur Battalion; 25th African Chasseur Battalion; 61st Infantry Regiment; 63rd Marine Infantry Regiment; 151st Motorized Infantry Regiment; 152nd Motorized Infantry Regiment; 153rd Motorized Infantry Regiment; 1st/ 8th Artillery Regiment; 3rd/28th Artillery Regiment; 4th/64th Artillery Regiment; 452nd Artillery Regiment
South Constantine zone	21st Infantry Division	4th African Chasseur Regiment; 18th Light Armored Regiment; 7th Algerian Rifles Regiment; 10th Chasseur Battalion; 17th Chasseur Battalion; 30th Chasseur Battalion; 24th Marine Infantry Regiment; 94th Infantry Regiment; 1st/1st Artillery Regiment; 4th/8th Artillery Regiment; 1st/421st Artillery Regiment
West Constantine zone	19th Infantry Division	3rd Hussar Regiment; 4th Dragoon Regiment; 6th Spahi Regiment; 12th African Chasseur Regiment; 20th Dragoon Regiment; 30th Dragoon Regiment; 2nd Marine Infantry Regiment; 11th Marine Infantry Regiment; 3rd Algerian Rifles Regiment; 4th Zouave Regiment; 28th African Chasseur Battalion; 29th Alpine Chasseur Battalion; 57th Infantry Regiment; 1st/2nd Marine Artillery Regiment; 2nd/62nd Artillery Regiment; 3rd/64th Artillery Regiment

== Algiers Zone 1961 ==
Zone	Division	Regiments and Others
North Algiers zone	No divisional organization	1st Foreign Legion Cavalry; 5th African Chasseur Regiment; 1st Algerian Rifles Regiment; 9th Zouave Regiment; 73rd Marine Infantry Regiment; 11th Infantry Regiment; 3rd/10th Marine Artillery Regiment; 2nd/65th Artillery Regiment; 3rd/65th Artillery Regiment; 1st/404th Artillery Regiment
East Algiers zone	27th Alpine Infantry Division	6th Hussar Regiment; 29th Light Armored Regiment; 1st Marine Infantry Regiment; 9th Marine Infantry Regiment; 6th Alpine Chasseur Battalion; 7th Alpine Chasseur Battalion; 15th Alpine Chasseur Battalion; 22nd Alpine Chasseur Battalion; 27th Alpine Chasseur Battalion; 2nd/39th Infantry Regiment; 121st Infantry Regiment; 2nd/237th Infantry Regiment; 159th Alpine Infantry Regiment; 1st/43rd Artillery Regiment; 1st/50th Artillery Regiment; 1st/61st Artillery Regiment; 1st/408th Artillery Regiment; 2nd/93rd Mountain Artillery Regiment
East Algiers zone	20th Infantry Division	1st African Chasseur Regiment; 2nd Foreign Legion Cavalry; 8th Hussar Regiment; 27th Dragoon Regiment; 2nd Infantry Regiment; 6th Infantry Regiment; 4th Rifles Regiment; 1st/7th Artillery Regiment; 1st/23rd Artillery Regiment; 1st/38th Artillery Regiment; 1st/47th Artillery Regiment; 2nd/67th Artillery Regiment; 1st/410th Artillery Regiment
West Algiers zone	9th Infantry Division	5th Spahi Regiment; 25th Dragoon Regiment; 28th Dragoon Regiment; 2nd/10th Mountain Artillery Regiment; 1st/18th Artillery Regiment; 2nd/20th Artillery Regiment; 1st/42nd Artillery Regiment; 1st/402nd Artillery Regiment

== General Reserve ==
Zone	Division	Regiments and Others
General Reserve	10th Parachute Division	1st Foreign Legion Parachute Regiment; 2nd Marine Parachute Infantry Regiment; 3rd Marine Parachute Infantry Regiment; 6th Marine Parachute Infantry Regiment; 9th Chasseur Parachute Regiment; 13th Dragoon Parachute Regiment; 20th Artillery Parachute Regiment
General Reserve	25th Parachute Division	1st Chasseur Parachute Regiment; 14th Chasseur Parachute Regiment; 18th Chasseur Parachute Regiment; 2nd Foreign Legion Parachute Regiment; 8th Marine Parachute Infantry Regiment; 1st Hussar Parachute Regiment; 1st/35th Light Artillery Parachute Regiment

== Sahara ==
Zone	Division	Regiments and Others
Sahara Zone	no divisional organization	35th Infantry Regiment; 3rd African Light Infantry Battalion; 26th Dragoon Regiment; 2nd/1st Marine Artillery Regiment; 1st/4th Marine Artillery Regiment; 1st/7th Marine Artillery Regiment; 1st/13th Artillery Regiment; 1st/401st Artillery Regiment; 701st Special Arms Group; 820th Special Arms Group; 821st Special Arms Group

== Aviation ==
From the time before World War II French Algeria in regards to air force operations was in the Area of Responsibility of the 5th Air Force Region (5e région aérienne (5e RA)). The region covered the territories of French Northern Africa (Afrique française du Nord (AFN)), which included Algeria (incorporated into Metropolitan France) and the colonies (protectorates) of Morocco and Tunisia. Correspondingly the 5th AFR had three air force commands assigned to it: Air Algérie, Air Maroc and Air Tunisie. With Morocco and Tunisia gaining independence in 1956 the 5th AFR's AOR decreased to the territory of Algiers. The 5th AFR's command echelon included a staff (état-major) and three regional directorates: Administration (la direction régionale du commissariat, Medical (la direction régionale du service de santé) and Materiel (la direction régionale du matériel).

- Algeria Air Force Command (le commandement d’Air Algérie) - tactical command subordinated to the 5th Air Force Region
  - units directly subordinated to the Algeria Air Force Command (fighters, bombers, recon aircraft, heavy transport aircraft)
  - Tactical Aviation Groupment No. 1 (groupement aérien tactique n° 1 (GATAC n° 1)), air force command for the Constantine operational region
  - Tactical Aviation Groupment No. 2 (groupement aérien tactique n° 2 (GATAC n° 2)), air force command for the Oran operational region
  - Tactical Aviation Groupment No. 3 (groupement aérien tactique n° 3 (GATAC n° 3)), air force command for the Algiers operational region

Each GATAC had its own Territorial Support Brigade (brigade territoriale de soutien (BTS)) for logistical support. The three GATACs were further divided into operational zones (zones opérationnelles), each commanded by an Air Force Command Post (poste de commandement air (PCA)). In 1959 the aviation assets in Algeria underwent a reorganization and the French Air Force took operational control over the Navy and Army aviation units in the war theatre. This created the army aviation's Light Aviation Support Groupments (groupements d’aviation légère d’appui).

=== Air Force Riflemen ===
The Air Force also deployed its own ground regiments of the Fusiliers de l'air, which used the French demi-brigade unit type. They were formed between September 1955 and June 1956, relying heavily on officers and NCOs posted from the Army. These units were subordinated to the three GATACs. The infantry units of the Air Force were transferred to the Army by the end of 1957.

- 531^{e} demi-brigade des fusiliers de l’air - based in Arba, Algiers sector
- 532^{e} demi-brigade des fusiliers de l’air - based in Saint-Denis du Sig, Oran sector
- 533^{e} demi-brigade des fusiliers de l’air - based in La Chiffa, Algiers sector
- 541^{e} demi-brigade des fusiliers de l’air - based in the Souk Ahras region, Constantine sector, the battalions were dispersed in 71 détachements in a rectangular area of 70 kms by 40 kms
- 542^{e} demi-brigade des fusiliers de l’air - based in Guelma, Constantine sector
- 543^{e} demi-brigade des fusiliers de l’air - based in Aïn Beïda, Sahara
- 544^{e} demi-brigade des fusiliers de l’air - initially formed in Tunisia, relocated to Algeria on October 10, 1956
- 545^{e} demi-brigade des fusiliers de l’air - initially formed in Tunisia, relocated to Algeria on October 10, 1956
- 546^{e} demi-brigade des fusiliers de l’air - based in Alma at the foothills of the Blida Atlas mountains
- 547^{e} demi-brigade des fusiliers de l’air - based in El Biar, Algiers sector

The command elements of the half-brigades (Unités à administration distincte (UAD)) actually belonged to the 5th Air Force Region's territorial administrative center (Centre administratif territorial de l'air (CATA) 860) in Blida and were attached to the infantry units.

The elite Parachute Commandos were retained at the central level of the 5th Air Force Region.

- fr:Groupement des commandos parachutistes de l'air 00/541 (GCPA) - included four combat units and one support unit, all called 'commandos':
  - Commando de l'air 10/541 « Martel » (forerunner of today's commando parachutiste de l'air n° 10)
  - Commando de l'air 20/541 « Manoir » (forerunner of today's commando parachutiste de l'air n° 20)
  - Commando de l'air 30/541 « Maquis » formed by personnel from the Air Force units in Morocco (forerunner of today's commando parachutiste de l'air n° 30)
  - Commando de l'air 40/541 « Maxime »

Each combat commando had an established strength of 102 men (5 officers, 22 NCOs and 75 ranks), but in the course of the war it could occasionally increase up to 180 men. The building block of the units was the Team (équipe) of 5 or 6 men. A Commando Group (groupe de commando) combined two teams for a total of 10 - 12 men, transportable by a single H-34 or two H-19 helicopters. A Commando Platoon (section de commando) combined two commando groups (total of four teams): two Command and Fire Teams (deux équipes de commandement et de feu) and two regular commando teams (deux équipes simples de commandos)

  - Commando de l'air 50/541 - was the logistical support unit. The GCPA included a Separate Administrative Unit (unité à administration distincte (UAD)) of 55 men. On May 1, 1957 the UAD absorbed the logistical personnel from Commando de l'air 50/541 and formed the HQ of the formation - GCPA 00/541 « Norpois ». Later Commando 50 was repurposed as a combat commando.

Two experimental commandos of reduced strength were added later:

- Commando expérimental « Chouf »
- Commando expérimental « Matou »

Due to their active involvement in the Algiers putsch of 1961 at the end of April all commandos were disbanded effective immediately. Personnel from Commando 10, 20 and 40 was dispersed between five air bases in metropolitan France - Dijon, Le Bourget, Toulouse, Istres and Caen. To fill up the void on May 1 two new units were formed at the BA 146 Reghaïa air base from personnel from Commando 30 and 50 and the men from the experimental commandos:

- compagnie de commandos parachutistes de l'air no 30.541
- compagnie de commandos parachutistes de l'air no 50.541

These units discarded the commando nomenclature in order to break with the previous units and the reason for their disbandment. The new companies also differed in their established structure with a strength of 5 officers, 33 NCOs and 100 ranks each.

== Sources ==
- Kanger, Kim "Algerian Insurgency: End of the French Empire", in Strategy & Tactics, No. 262 (May/June 2010)
- Shrader, Charles R. (1999). The First Helicopter War: Logistics and Mobility in Algeria 1954-62. Greenwood Publishing Group.
