= Frédéric Geille =

French military officer (1896–1976)

- Born: 19 November 1896; Brest, France
- Died: 21 July 1976 (aged 79); Saint-Germain-en-Laye, France
- Military career
- Allegiance: France
- Branch: French Army; French Air Force
- Rank: Colonel
- Commands: Group III/2^{e} Escadre; Group III/6^{e} Escadre; 1st Parachute Chasseur Regiment; 1^{er} RCP; EMAA
- Conflicts: World War I World War II

Colonel Frédéric Cyrille Jules (Fred) Geille (French: Frédéric Geille; 19 November 1896, in Brest – 21 July 1976, in Saint-Germain-en-Laye) was a French military officer. Geille was the first French paratrooper and a fighter pilot (French: Pilote de Chasse) of the French Air Force as well as a commander and founder of various units and initiatives. He is also considered the father of French paratroopers and the inventor of French High-Altitude Operational Jumpers (French: Chuteurs Opérationnels).

== Biography ==
His studies at École des Beaux-Arts (Fine Arts) of Rennes were interrupted by the First World War. Accordingly, he engaged himself and in 1914 joined the 41st Infantry Regiment (French: 41^{e} Régiment d'Infanterie), "for the duration of the entire war". He accordingly took part in combat in Éparges, Argonne, Verdun and Champagne. In May 1917, he obtained a citation for "taking command of his unit, and by his energetic intervention will, brought the unfolding of the enemy" while he was the only ranked surviving of his section.

Designated Sous-Lieutenant by battlefield promotion under fire, Geille, upon his request, joined the Military Aeronautics (French: l'Aéronautique militaire) in 1917. Brevetted as an observer, he was assigned to the Escadriile BR7, dotted de Breguet XIV. He had the opportunity to distinguish capability in 1918 « succeeding at delicate as well as perilous missions on top of enemy lines ». It was during that period that he conducted his first parachute experiment. At the end of war, he remained in Military Aeronautics.

At the end of the war, Frédéric Geille finally remained in the army. Designated definitely as a Sous-Lieutenant, he went to Poland in the corps of the Escadrille SAL 39, with the Blue Army of general Józef Haller, then engaged against Soviet Russia. There, the young (French: Le jeune) officer showcased « evidence of an energy at all obstacles and at great tenacity ».

Returned to France, Sous-Lieutenant Geille finished by obtained his brevet as a military pilot. After having served in North Africa and in Lebanon (at the 39th Aviation Regiment), he was promoted to captain in 1927. He then passed a couple of years at the general staff headquarters of the 22^{e} Escadre, at Chartres.

From 1931 to 1935, he was a pilot at the 2^{e} Escadre de Chasse (French: 2^{e} Escadre de Chasse), situated on Aerial Base 112 Chartres-Champhol (French: base aérienne 122 Chartres-Champhol).

Nevertheless, an event evoked his interests: in 1934, in front of numerous foreign observers, the Soviets conducted a parachute jump, in the region of Kiev, of two battalions - with light artillery means - which, within the cadres of the grand maneuver, were able to apprehend a small town which was designated for them. The Red Army has retaken to account an idea put in circulation since 1918 by Commandant Ernest Evrard. However, the latter's intuition did not lift the enthusiasm of the respective general staff headquarters at the époque.

Nevertheless, both Captains Geille and Durieux (both pilots) as well battalion chief (French: chef de bataillon) Chalret du Rieu obtained to be sent to the USSR to study the techniques of Russian Soviet Jumps.

A candidate at the School of Tuchino, near Moscow, Frédéric Geille obtained the brevet of chief paratrooper instructor number 3 (French: instructeur en chef de parachutisme n°3). Returned to France, he was joined by « Kapitan » Kaitanoff, a brevetted paratrooper of the Red Army, officered as a technical councilor. The latter would be at the origin of a surprising anecdote. At Vilacoublay, during the campaign trial, which consisted of dropping mannequins as homologues of paratroopers, one of them would not open. The Soviet Officer accordingly examined the suspension lines and canopy of the defected exemplary, refolded the chute before boarding the aircraft and jumped with it. The homologue was accordingly accomplished.

Having pursued the instructor parachute (French: moniteur parachutiste) course in the Soviet Union. Upon his return to France, he organized at Pujaut, not far from Avignon, the center of Parachute Instruction of the French Air Force which he assumed command. Owing to his instruction center, the 601st Air Infantry Group 601^{e} GIA was born on 1 April 1937, first parachute unit of the French Air Force constituted on the model which existed then in a couple of countries (Soviet Union and Germany notably). On another hand, the 602nd Air Infantry Group 602^{e} GIA was based in Algeria. The mission confined to these two units was « transport by aircraft and disembark by parachute, in enemy territory, infantry detachments ».

Promoted Commandant in 1937, he realized two records the same year: that of a "saut à l'arraché" of thirty five meters of height and that of twelve jumps in one hour and forty five minutes.

In 1938, after the creation of the 601st Air Infantry Group 601^{e} GIA and 602nd Air Infantry Group 602 ^{e} GIA (at Reims, and White House, in Algeria), Commandant Geille returned to the Hunter Fighter Aviation Field (French: Aviation de Chasse) and was assigned to the 2^{e} Escadre, at the corps of which, he formed the III^{rd} Group.

On 27 February 1939 the 601st Air Infantry Group 601^{e} GIA left the Aerial Base 112 Reims-Champagne (French: base aérienne de Reims) to rejoin the 602^{e} GIA on the land of Algiers - White House (French: Alger-Maison Blanche).

As a Fighter pilot at the 2^{e} Escadre de Chasse, on the Aerial Base 112 Chartres-Champhol (French: base aérienne 122 Chartres-Champhol), and Commandant of one of the Escadrilles, his brevet of moniteur parachutiste (parachute instructor brevet), the first in France, was counter parted in February 1939.

=== Second World War ===
In 1940, Commandant Geille executed with success the first Aerial attack towards the ground with armored contingents. On 13 June 1940 he was hit by a Messerschmitt Bf 109. His equipment in flames, he was severely burned, and managed to saved his life in extremis by jumping in parachute out his aircraft. That evening, he had to land forcibly after having descended in front of a flak.

On 25 December 1940, barely recovered, he assumed command of the III^{rd} Group of the 6^{e} Escadre based in Algiers. He left the group after the Syria–Lebanon Campaign on 15 November 1941, the date on which he was promoted to Lieutenant-Colonel. He commanded during one year the Military air base of Ouakam (today in Senegal), then was placed in non-activity by the Government of Vichy.

Recalled to activity, he was designated as a Colonel on 25 June 1943 and took command of the 1st Parachute Chasseur Regiment 1^{er} RCP at Fez on 1 July 1943, which he led under fire during the Liberation of France.

Assigned to the general staff headquarters of the French Air Force on 25 November 1944, he was delegated two important tasks:

- Create in Valence a personnel depot for airborne troops (French: troupes aéroportées) where jump and combat training would take lieu, in order to create a Parachute Division;
- Create, then command a Grouping of Instruction Schools of navigating personnel in the South-West of France.

=== After-war ===
The end of the war in Europe stopped his works. Attained since two years by the age limit of navigating personnel, and even though well retained in the officers corps of Air Force at exceptional title, colonel Geille solicited and obtained to be placed on leave from the navigating personnel on 18 May 1945. He left the French Air Force indefinitely on 19 May 1950.

A couple years later, colonel Frédéric Geille succeeded the works of colonels Pierre-Louis Bourgoin (French: Pierre-Louis Bourgoin) and Bernard Dupérier (French: Bernard Dupérier). In 1949, he would be the founder of the National Federation of French Paratroopers (French: Fédération Nationale des Parachutistes Français), at origin of the French Parachute Federation (French: Fédération française de parachutisme) and the National Association of Veteran Paratroopers (French: l'Association Nationale des Anciens Parachutistes).

He is titular of at least eight citations out which two at the title of the war of 1914–1918, one at the title of the Polish Army and five at the title of war of 1939-45. He was also seen, bestowed three satisfactory attestations. He was also titled of two Aerial Victories on 16 May 1940 and 8 June 1940.

The three units which he commanded – the Groups III/2, III/6 and the 1^{er} RCP – were brilliantly cited during the Second World War, and his role as a commander of these units, is particularly underlined.

Commander of the Légion d'honneur, titled of more than eight citations, and inventor of the actual French « Chuteurs Opérationnels, Colonel Geille died on 21 July 1976 at Saint-Germain-en-Laye. He incarnated « a legendary type of courage and sense of humor » while being « a remarkable instructor of men ».

== Decorations ==

- Commander of the Order of the Légion d'honneur
- Croix de guerre 1914-1918
- Croix de guerre 1939-1945
- Croix de guerre des théâtres d'opérations extérieures
- Inter-Allied Medal
- Volunteer combatant's cross 1914–1918
- Médaille de vermeil de la société d'encouragement au progrès
- Croix de la vaillance polonaise
- Knight of the Order of Polonia Restituta
- Commander of the Cherifian Order of Ouissam Alaouite

== See also ==
- Major (France)
- Escadron de Chasse 2/30 Normandie-Niemen
- 10th Parachute Division (France)
- 25th Parachute Division (France)
- 11th Parachute Brigade (France)
