= Jean Bréchignac =

French Army officer (1914–1984)

- Brechignac (left) consulting a map. Indochina, 1953.
- Born: 25 September 1914; Cran-Gevrier, Haute-Savoie, France
- Died: 25 May 1984; Flayosc, Var, France
- Alma mater: École spéciale militaire de Saint-Cyr (promotion 1935—37)
- Military career
- Allegiance: France
- Branch: French Army
- Rank: Lieutenant Colonel
- Nickname: "Brèche"
- Units: 1er Régiment de Chasseurs Parachutistes (1er RCP); 9e Régiment de Chasseurs Parachutistes (9e RCP)
- Commands: 2nd Battalion, 1er RCP; 9e RCP
- Conflicts: World War II; First Indochina War; Algerian War
- Awards: Commander of the Légion d'honneur

Jean Bréchignac (25 September 1914 – 25 May 1984) was a French Army officer who served in the Forces Françaises Libres in the Second World War and later became an airborne commander in Indochina and Algeria.

A graduate of the École spéciale militaire de Saint-Cyr, he led the 2nd Battalion of the 1st Parachute Chasseur Regiment (1er RCP) at Dien Bien Phu, where he survived Viet Minh captivity. He then commanded the 9e RCP in Algeria and served as chief of staff of the 25e Division Parachutiste. His career ended after he took part in the 1961 Algiers putsch, for which he received a suspended sentence and was removed from the active list.

He was a Commander of the Légion d'honneur and received thirteen citations.

== Early life and Second World War ==
Bréchignac was born on 25 September 1914 in Cran-Gévrier, Haute-Savoie. He graduated from the Saint-Cyr Military Academy (promotion Maréchal Lyautey 1935—37). He first served with the Algerian tirailleurs in Tunisia

During the Second World War he joined the Forces Françaises Libres and served as a lieutenant in the newly established 1st Parachute Chasseur Regiment (1er RCP) from 1943 to 1945. The 1er RCP's first engagements came in the Vosges and Alsace, where its companies fought through the forêt de Géhan and later took part in the fighting at Jebsheim during the Battle of the Colmar Pocket before entering Colmar on 3 February 1945.

== Indochina and Algeria ==
Volunteering for service in the Far East, Bréchignac disembarked in Indochina in February 1947 with the demi-brigade de marche parachutiste. He was parachuted onto Hòa Bình on 15 April 1947 and took part in the capture of the town, then was dropped on Cao Bằng on 9 October 1947 during Operation Léa. He was repatriated on 22 July 1948.

Volunteering for a second tour, Bréchignac took command of the 2nd Battalion of the 1er RCP, arriving in Indochina on 17 January 1953, when the unit was formed from the former 10th Parachute Chasseur Battalion. He took part in several airborne operations, including Operation Castor in November 1953, the seizure of the future base intended to block the route to Laos and threaten Viet Minh rear areas, before his battalion was relieved at the beginning of December and later deployed in the Seno region of Laos.

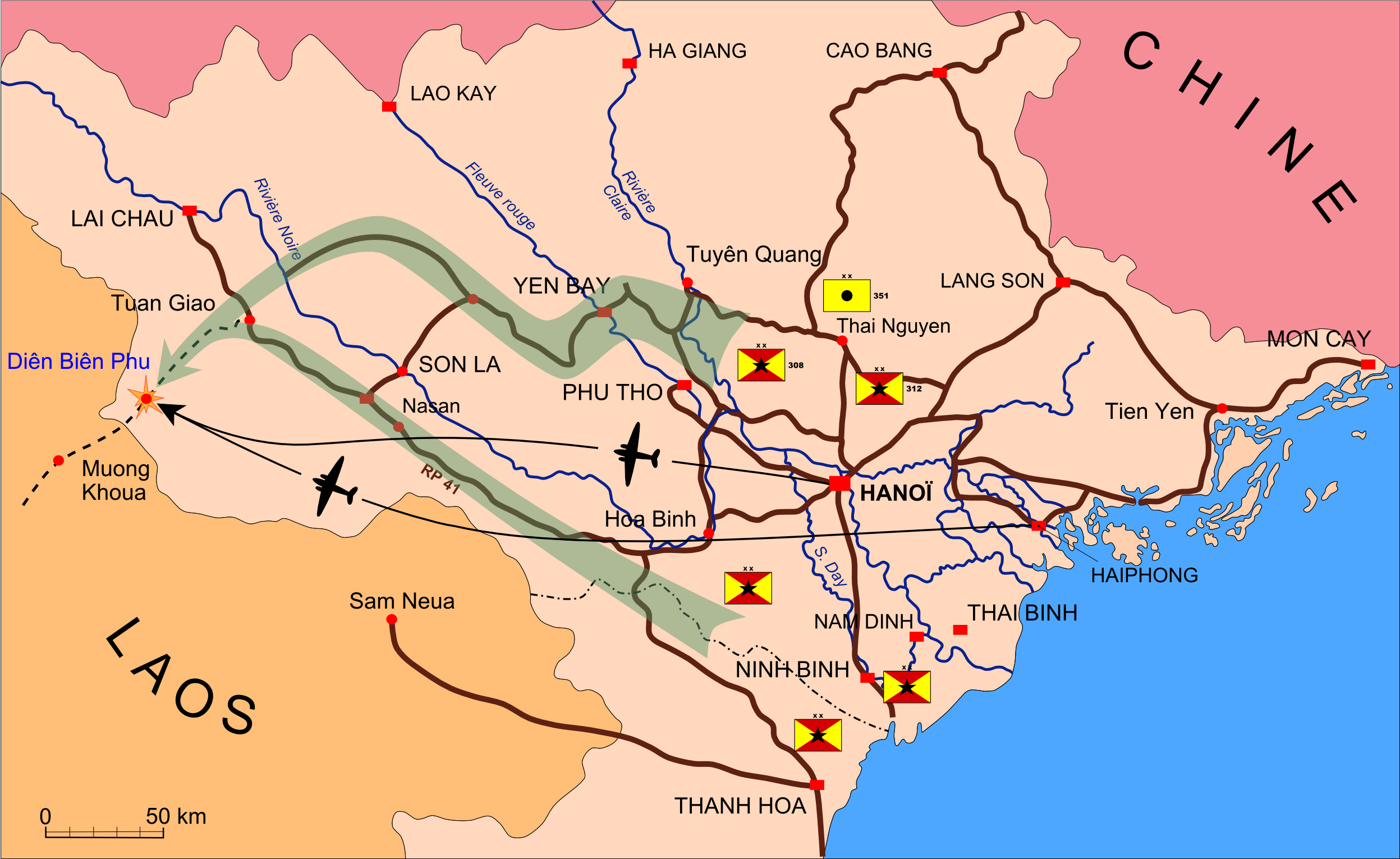
Map of Dien Bien Phu showing where Bréchignac's 1er RCP battalion was dropped.

Bréchignac and his battalion were airdropped into Dien Bien Phu in two waves during the first nights of April 1954 (1rd to 4th) as reinforcement. During the final phase of the battle, companies of the regiment were committed to the fighting on the Éliane positions, a group of fortified strongpoints, suffering heavy losses before the ceasefire. His battalion was worn down throughout April in repeated attempts to retake Éliane, and on 6 May Bréchignac was captured on Éliane 2 with the survivors of his unit. Interned in Camp No. 1, he was released at Vietri in September 1954. Bréchignac thus survived Viet Minh captivity. Known as "Brèche", he was credited with the capture of the headquarters of the Communist 325th Division in Laos.

Promoted lieutenant-colonel during the Algerian War, he commanded the 9e Régiment de Chasseurs Parachutistes from August 1958 to August 1960. During this period, airborne regiments were heavily committed to internal security operations across Algeria, including urban counterinsurgency in Algiers and large-scale search operations in the Aurès and Kabylie regions. His command coincided with the intensification of the conflict following the 1954 uprising known as the Toussaint Rouge.

Bréchignac later served as chief of staff to General Émile Autrand, commander of the 25e Division Parachutiste. Continuing his career within airborne formations.

== Putsch, trial and later life ==
During the Algiers putsch of April 1961, an attempted military uprising against President de Gaulle’s Algerian policy, Bréchignac aligned himself with units that joined the coup, including the 2e REP and 8e RPIMa. When the putsch collapsed, he was arrested and transferred to metropolitan France.

Bréchignac was charged with participation in the putsch and appeared before the Haut Tribunal Militaire. His defence, described as "strictly technical" by Le Monde, focused on the chain of events within the 25e Division Parachutiste. He argued that several regiments had already moved without orders, that command authority had broken down, and that he acted to prevent further disorder. He denied involvement in preparing the revolt and stated that he learned of the situation only on 22 April.

On 26 June 1961 he received a two-year suspended sentence and was removed from the active list. Bréchignac lived in retirement until his death on 25 May 1984 in Flayosc, Var.

== Legacy ==
Described as a legendary figure of the Indochina War and regarded as the finest battalion commander of his generation, Bréchignac's reputation drew comparisons with Bigeard. The two officers were considered equally capable, yet markedly different in temperament: Bréchignac discreet and modest, Bigeard, less so.

== Decorations ==
He received thirteen citations during his career and was made Commander of the Légion d'honneur.

== Sources ==
- Authie, Frédéric. "1er RCP – Site officiel –". www.rcp1.terre.defense.gouv.fr (in French).
- Carichon, Christophe (3 October 2018). Arnaud Beltrame, gendarme de France (in French). Editions du Rocher. ISBN 978-2-268-10112-5.
- Cochet, François; Collectif; Porte, Rémy; Cadeau, Ivan (21 October 2021). La guerre d'Indochine - Dictionnaire (in French). Place des éditeurs. ISBN 978-2-262-08701-2.
- Cottaz, Maurice (1962). Les procès du putsch d'Alger et du complot de Paris (in French). Nouvelles Editions Latines.
- Fall, Bernard B. (1967). Hell in a Very Small Place: The Siege of Dien Bien Phu. Lippincott.
- "Bréchignac, Jean". FranceArchives. 25 September 1914.
- Keesing's Contemporary Archives. Keesing's Limited. 1962.
- "Le colonel Bréchignac est condamné à deux ans de prison avec sursis". Le Monde.fr (in French). 28 June 1961.
- "Indochine, Diên-Biên-Phu, avril 1954". Légion Etrangère (in French). 3 April 2014.
- Leonetti, Guy (2014). Mémorial Indochine: 1945–1954 (in French). Giovanangeli. ISBN 978-2-7587-0121-7.
- Montagnon, Pierre (1990). La France coloniale (in French). Pygmalion/G. Watelet. ISBN 978-2-85704-280-8.
- Morgan, Ted (23 February 2010). Valley of Death: The Tragedy at Dien Bien Phu That Led America into the Vietnam War. Random House Publishing Group. ISBN 978-1-58836-980-2.
- News Year. F FoF. 1962.
- Jean-Claude Lordon (January 2019). "La "Maréchal Lyautey" (1935–37) s'est éteinte" (PDF).
