= 1st Parachute Chasseur Regiment =

- 1^{e} Régiment de Chasseurs Parachutistes
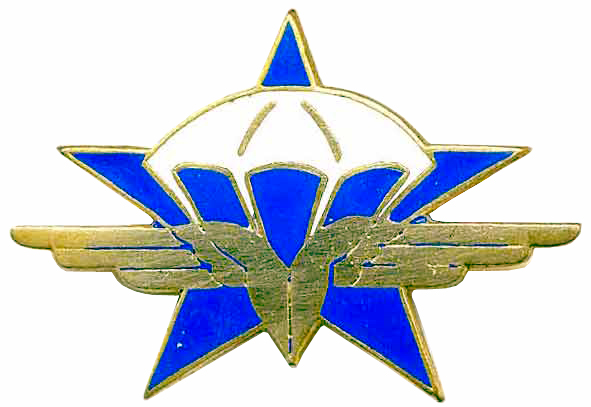
- Active: 1943–present
- Country: France
- Branch: French Army formerly French Air Force (1937–1943)
- Type: Airborne forces
- Role: Airborne infantry
- Size: ~ 1,100 rapaces
- Part of: 11th Parachute Brigade; 3rd Division
- Garrison/HQ: Pamiers, France
- Mottos: Vaincre ou mourir ('Win or die')
- Anniversaries: Saint Michael, September 29
- Engagements: World War II: North Africa Campaign; Liberation of Paris; First Indochina War: Battle of Dien Bien Phu; Algerian War; Lebanese Civil War 1975–1990: United Nations Interim Force in Lebanon; Multinational Force 1982–1984; Global War on Terrorism: War in Afghanistan (2001–present); Northern Mali conflict; Operation Serval

Commanders
- Current commander: Colonel Olivier Vidal
- Notable commanders: Henri Sauvagnac; Jacques Faure; Paul Aussaresses
- Abbreviation: 1^{er} RCP

The 1st Parachute Chasseur Regiment (French: 1^{er} Régiment de Chasseurs Parachutistes, 1^{er} R.C.P) is the oldest and among the most decorated airborne forces regiments of the French Army. Established in the French Army in 1943, and formerly part of the French Air Force since 1937, the chasseur distinguished its Regimental Colors during the campaigns of the Liberation of Paris, the First Indochina War in 1947, 1950, 1953, 1954 and the Algerian War. This elite regiment is part of the 11th Parachute Brigade.

The 1st Parachute Chasseur Regiment is the only French parachute regiment that traces its roots to the French Air Force, hence the representation of a golden hawk on the rank insignia and that of uniforms and which originally referred to the 601st Airborne Infantry Group and 602nd Airborne Infantry Group respectively (601^{e} G.I.A, 602^{e} G.I.A).

== History, creation and different nominations ==
=== The Genesis ===
In 1935, the Soviet Union successfully parachuted airborne contingents with various equipment and supporting materials. Made aware of this, France dispatched three officers to the Soviet Union, Captain Frédéric Geille (prime paratrooper and fighter pilot, Captain Durieux and Captain Charley Durrieu, to familiarize themselves with and train on the parachute techniques adopted by the Soviet Union. On September 12, 1935, the French Air Minister, Général Denain, decreed the creation of a parachute training center in Avignon-Pujaut and accordingly on October 3, 1936, French Air Minister Pierre Cot signed a decree which stipulated that Combat Air Brigades can include Air Infantry Units.

On April 1, 1937, two Airborne Infantry Groups (French: Groupe d'infanterie de l'air, G.I.A) were created, the 601st at Reims and the 602nd at Baraki near Algiers. The Airborne Groups conducted their infantry training respectively at the 95th Infantry Regiment (France)) (originally the Graubünden 9th Swiss Regiment in service of France) in Bourges and the 4th Zouaves Regiment (French: 4e régiment de zouaves, 4e R.Z) in Tunisia. In 1939, the 601st Airborne Infantry Group joined the 602nd at Baraki and conducted joint military airborne parachute maneuvers at Boghar, Algeria using the Potez 650.

=== World War II ===
==== Vosges and Colmar Campaigns ====
With the outbreak of World War II on September 1, 1939, both the 601st and 602nd returned to France. In April 1940, an Air Marching Infantry Company was formed, under the command of Captain Sauvagnac, which served in the Niederbronn-les-Bains region of Alsace. On August 25, 1940, the German offensive of May 1940 pushed the marching company to Marseille-Mérignane, where it boarded for Oran and then Algiers where it was subsequently disbanded.

In March 1941, the 1^{re} C.I.A (French: 1^{re} Compagnie d'infanterie de l'air, 1^{re} C.I.A) or Air Infantry Company was formed from components of the two dissolved Airborne Infantry Groups, at Oued Smar near Algiers. The 1^{re} CIA was renamed Air Company n°1 and commanded by Captain Sauvagnac. In January 1943, following the allied landings in North Africa, the 1^{re} C.I.A or 1st Air Company n°1 landed in Fes, Morocco. Subsequently, the 1^{re} C.I.A was transformed into the first battalion of parachute chasseurs n°1 under the command of Commandant Sauvagnac. On February 1, 1943, the 1^{re} C.I.A n°1 became the 1st Parachute Chasseur Battalion (1^{er} BCP) with 4 combat companies and on June 1, 1943, the 1st Parachute Chasseur Battalion (1^{er} BCP) became the 1st Parachute Chasseur Regiment (1^{er} RCP) with 10 combat companies including a central command and two battalions under the command of Commandant Sauvagnac. Commandant Hartmann took command of the 1st Parachute Chasseur Regiment in June and July 1943 and in August 1943, Commandant Gueille took command of the 1st Parachute Chasseur Regiment while Commandant Faure commanded the 2nd battalion.

In October 1943, the 1st Parachute Chasseur Regiment was attached to the U.S. 82nd Airborne Division and conducted intense training exercises with Douglas type planes. On September 28, 1944; organized as a "light reconnaissance troop"; the regiment was assigned to the 1st Army under disposition orders of Général Jean Joseph Marie Gabriel de Lattre de Tassigny.

Oldest French parachute regiment; the 1st Parachute Chasseur Regiment of the French Air Force fought during the Liberation of France. The regiment engaged in combat during the campaigns of Vosges and Alsace during World War II. During this time, the regiment was put at the disposition and orders of the 2nd Armored Division commanded by General Philippe Leclerc de Hauteclocque, engaging the German paratroopers of the 1st Parachute Division in the decisive battle for the liberation of Colmar. On January 28 and 29, 1945; with temperatures below −20 °C and under a flood of shrapnel shells " house to house, hall after hall", the regiment seizes the Alsatian village of Jebsheim while sustaining 700 injured and dead. During Colmar Pocket, the regiment fought alongside the Commandant Boulanger's III battalion of the Marching Regiment of the Foreign Legion (III battalion/ R.M.L.E, assigned to CC6) of the French Foreign Legion at Jebsheim (N-E de Colmar) from January 25 to January 30. Whether in the Vosges or Alsace, the 1st Parachute Chasseur Regiment wrote in blood the most glorious pages of the regiment's history: 1150 paratroopers were injured and killed in action; the regimental colors received the first two 2 palms at the orders of the Armed Forces. During the final courses of the war, the 1st Parachute Chasseur Regiment of the French Air Force would be seen transferred to the French Army.

=== First Indochina War ===
==== Battle of Dien Bien Phu ====
On July 30, 1947, the unit was separated as a regiment and the I, II and III parachute battalions (I/1^{er} RCP, II/ 1^{er} RCP, III/ 1^{er} RCP) took part separately in the First Indochina War and were referred to as the "III Indochina Battalions". The three parachute battalions engaged successively in airborne operations in and around the delta of Tonkin. The rapaces of the 1st Parachute Chasseur were the only ones dropped at night on Dien Bien Phu while encircled by Viêt-minh troops. As an old combatant (French: un ancien) recalled: In this month of June, the rice fields were flooded, while we had to land smoothly and softly at night, we still had the inconvenience to extract from our pair of rangers (boots) a beautifully thick and sticky layer. The parachutes where submerged in water and doubled in weight... we tried to remain small because bullets were whistling near our ears. The beginning of May 1954, the Viêt-minh troops gave way to the final assault. On the night of May 1 to May 2; the first and second combat company rejoined the support point Eilane 4. One week later, Eliane 4 fell and only 19 survivors all which were taken prisoners. Dien Bien Phu was lost and fell on May 7, 1954, at 1730. The couple of hectares today are filled with corn fields centered by a stele which commemorates the sacrifices of the paratroopers and Legionnaires who served with distinction in the French Foreign Legion and who wrote a painful and glorious page in the history of the airborne troops of France. The sacrifice of 400 rapaces of the 1st Parachute Chasseur Regiment since the Indochina engagement in 1947 earned the regiment a new decoration: the fourragère bearing colors of the Croix de guerre des théâtres d'opérations extérieures with 7 palms.

=== Algeria ===
==== Algerian War ====
On November 1, 1954; it is Toussaint Rouge ("Red All Saints' Day") in Algeria. During the day at Arris, rebel terrorist groups intercepted a transport vehicle carrying dozens of Muslims and one couple of young teachers. The rebel terrorists killed the Qaid and the two Europeans.

The insurrectionary debuted and the first bombs exploded in Algiers, and all over Algeria counted thirty-some coordinated suicides are targets. It was the commencement of a seven-year war torn era. Already on the ground since 1949, the 1st Parachute Chasseur Regiment quickly engaged in the first military operations to maintain order. In the city of Alger, the regiment participated to the reestablishing of order and security. Nevertheless, the conflict radicalized itself quickly. The rebellion touched all the regions. Recovery, search and patrol operations in the Djebel were distracted by combat engagements with the rebels that slowed down the progression and lead to the loss of human life from one side like the other. Aflou, Ain Roua, Bordj Gasses, Ain Soltan, Masqueray, El Milia, Djebel Bezzez...combat engagements were violent. Following a 15-year garrison on the Algerian soil; the regiment was repatriated to mainland France before the ceasefire. The regiment headquartered garrison on July 3, 1959, at Moulins-Lès-Metz, Moselle. The following year, the regiment followed Pau in the Pyrénées-Atlantiques. The campaign AFN 1952–1962 was inscribed on the regimental colors of the 1st Parachute Chasseur Regiment.

=== Lebanon ===
==== Lebanese Civil War ====
The 1st Parachute Chasseur Regiment participated at the request of the Lebanese Government in serving within the ranks of the Multinational Force in Lebanon in 1982. On the morning of October 23, 1983; the bombing of the Drakkar barracks claimed the lives of 55 paratroopers of the 3rd combat company of Captain Jacky Thomas of the 1st Parachute Chasseur Regiment and 3 paratroopers of the 9th Parachute Chasseur Regiment. On November 10, 1983; the 1st combat company of Captain Lanoux embarked at Beirut to replace the 3rd combat company. On December 1, 1983; paratrooper Gallais died from his wounds during an ambush in Beirut. Mandated to the United Nations Interim Force in Lebanon (UNIFIL), the French paratroopers of the 1st Parachute Chasseur Regiment left Lebanon in February 1984. Only two years later; both paratroopers regiments of the 1st Parachute Chasseur Regiment and 9th Parachute Chasseur Regiment would find themselves back in Lebanon. The 2nd combat company of the 1st Parachute Chasseur Regiment would serve within the ranks of UNIFIL in 1985 and 1986. On the other hand, paratroopers of the 9th Parachute Chasseur Regiment would serve to their turn the ranks of UNIFIL in 1986, 1998 and 1999 before the paratroopers of the 9th merged with the 1st Parachute Chasseur Regiment in 1999.

=== Foreign operations ===
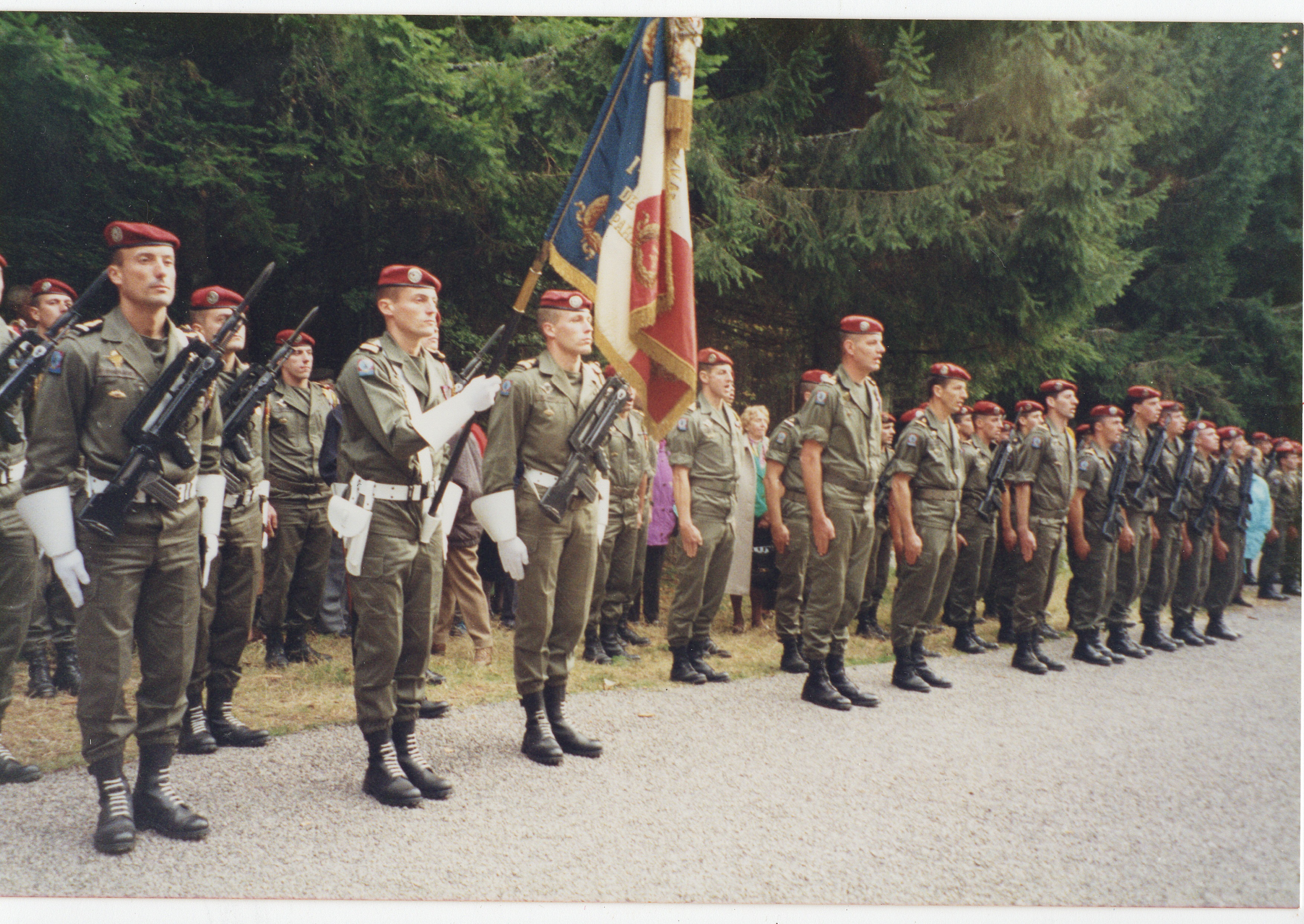
1st Parachute Chasseur Regiment in 1994

In 1970, the 1^{er} RCP created and implemented a system of "rotating combat companies" in New Caledonia, Réunion and Gabon and that in order to make ready immediate pre-positioned forces in case of operational necessity. Almost every year, a combat company is sent to these territories for missions lasting 4 months.

The Rapaces (term for paratroopers of the 1^{er} RCP) are deployed around the four corners of the globe where conflicts are born and or at the calling of the international community.

At the stage theatre of exterior operations, the 1st Parachute Chasseur Regiment has both a military and humanitarian approach on callings. The regiment demined the roads and rice fields in Cambodia, ameliorated and constructed schools and gave French lessons. The regiment also evacuated those exiting French citizens from the Ivory Coast, Gabon, Nouméa, Tchad, Mauritania and ex-Yugoslavia.

In a situational crisis, the men of the 1st Parachute Chasseur Regiment are known to always interpose between belligerents and protect civilians at all cost. Dedicated to such a mission, the regiment sometimes pays the price heavily in losses. Ten year later in June 1993, two combat companies of the 1^{er} RCP land at the aerodrome of Phnom Penh, in the greater west of Cambodia. Whether on Patrols in search for opposing rebel groups, or escorting the convoys of the United Nations and Non-governmental organization; the missions of the regiment took place in a tense climate with the Khmer Rouge. Since 40 years, the Cambodians have been living in a civil war. The situation degraded end of June with automatic arms firing and intensifying mortar fire rounds bursting the environment. As a result, to maintain, the primary mission of the paratroopers of the 1^{er} RCP focused on protecting the population. The men of the 1^{er} RCP operated through the seasonal unpredictable monsoon, the precarious life conditions, tropical diseases, and operations on the most mined terrain of the world.

The arrival of the regiment at Pamiers in 1999 coincided with the professionalism of the French Army. The 1^{er} RCP changed status from regiment of calling to a professional regiment. The tempo and projection rhythm accelerated and operations commenced.

In 2000 the situation in Kosovo exploded. The 1^{er} RCP landed one reinforcing battalion part of the international brigade in Kosovo, a country ravaged by conflicts between Serbian authorities and Albanian separatists. The principal and immediate mission of the regiment was to ensure the security of the municipal elections. The regiments immediately managed controlled riots and croud dispersions to the point of effect where the mission became a pivot prolongation to maintain status for a long term peace.

The beginning of the years 2000 witnessed a recurring engagement of the rapaces (paratroopers of the 1^{er} RCP) on the African soil around Chad, Gabon and Central African Republic. However, the most marking one would be the Ivory Coast. At the end of 2002, a battalion of the 1^{er} RCP prepositioned in Gabon, was projected in urgency to Abidjan in order to participate in the exiting of French citizens. As a result, the regiment prepositioned a 3-month duration operation to counter the offensives launched by the rebels and moved to the pursuit of other missions. In parallel with the departure and demand of global operations; the combat companies of the 1st Parachute Chasseur Regiment put into motion effect "Guépard Alert", enacted for urgent interventions. In March 2004, the regiment lived the departure of two "Guépard Alerts", one on Haiti and one on Kosovo.

=== Afghanistan ===
The 2nd combat company made way to the Afghan capital in January 2006. Near 200 paratroopers were deployed around the vicinity of Kabul or a mission duration of 5 months. France has been engaged since 5 years amongst the ranks of the NATO-OTAN ISAF in this country situated at the intersection of civilizations. Day and night, the 5 combat Para Platoons, patrol, assured a continuous presence, visible and promising near a population torn by more than 25 years of war.

In 2007, the Rapaces (paratroopers of the 1^{er} RCP) arrived in the Afghan theatre again, this time however as a constituted and formed battalion. 5 new months of presence at Kabul with a principal mission to control the field of Chamalie, a diverse terrain of more than 250 km^{2}, as well as protecting Camp Warehouse at the heart of Kabul.

Following the projection of a team in 2009 to train the Afghan Army in Urozgan Province, it is the Kapisa Province, 80 km north east of Kabul that welcomed in 2011 the 1st Parachute Chasseur Regiment. One province and year marked the history of the regiment. Engaged at the corps of Battle Group Raptor, more than 600 paratroopers got acquainted with rigorous climate, the language barriers, the different cultures, the violence of combat, the improvised explosive devices and the suicide attacks of Afghanistan. The situation menace was permanent and the paratroopers were continuously engaged in fire combat exchanges launched by the insurgency; the intensity of combat clashes are indelible. For combat actions lead in Afghanistan in 2007 and in summer of 2011, the regimental colors were decorated with the Cross for Military Valour with 2 palms.

=== Mali ===
On January 11, 2013; France intervened in Mali and launched Operation Serval. Paratroopers of the 1st and 2nd combat company of the 1^{er} RCP were part of the first elements engaged in the conflict. Both combat companies were deployed within the regiment's "Guépard Alert". As of January 26, 2013; both combat companies lead the dispositif and illustrated their tactical capabilities and conquered the Niger river while taking over the airport and the bridge of GAO through an air assault raid. Shortly after, the paratroopers of the 1^{er} RCP launched two air assault raids on February 2 at Kidal and February 8 at Tessalit to capture both airports. Subsequently, the paratroopers were engaged in the Battle of Ifoghas at the heart of the enemy's sanctuary where they confronted at short range in heavy combat, determined insurgents tightly attached to the terrain. The regiment imposed heavy casualties on the enemy, captured numerous prisoners and recouped a significant quantity of ammunitions. On March 2, 2013; one rapace (paratrooper) was killed by enemy fire and accordingly a new name would be subsequently inscribed on the regiment's memorial.

For actions lead in Mali in 2013 within Operation Serval, the regimental colors of the 1st Parachute Chasseur Regiment received, from the Chief of Staff of the French Army général Jean-Pierre Bosser, a citation at the orders of the armed forces with attribution of the Cross for Military Valour with bronze palm.

== Organisation ==
- Command and Logistic Company
- Support and Reconnaissance Company
- 1st Combat Company
- 2nd Combat Company
- 3rd Combat Company
- 4th Combat Company
- 5th Combat Company
- 8th Company (reserve)
- 9th Company (reserve)

== Traditions ==
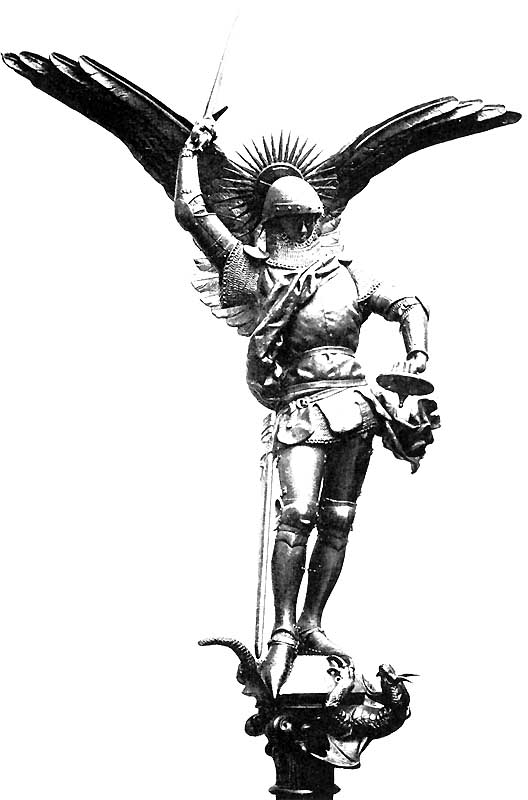
The Archangel Michael featured in Mont Saint-Michel and the Insignia of the 9th Parachute Chasseur Regiment.

Except for the Legionnaires of the 1^{er} REG, 2^{e} REG, 2^{e} REP who wear the Green Beret, the remainder of the French army metropolitan and marine paratroopers forming the 11th Parachute Brigade wear the Red Beret.

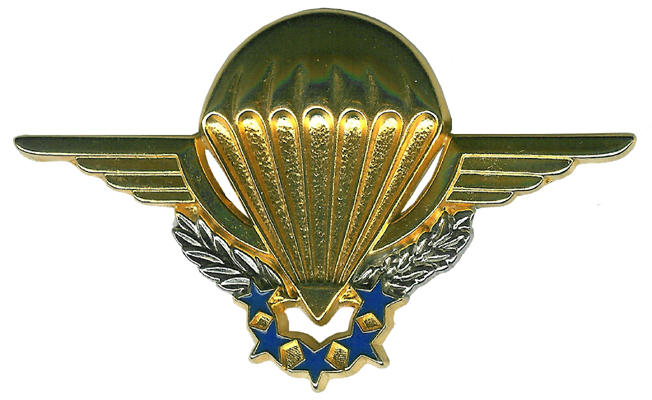
French Commando Parachute Group Brevet of Chuteur Opérationnel

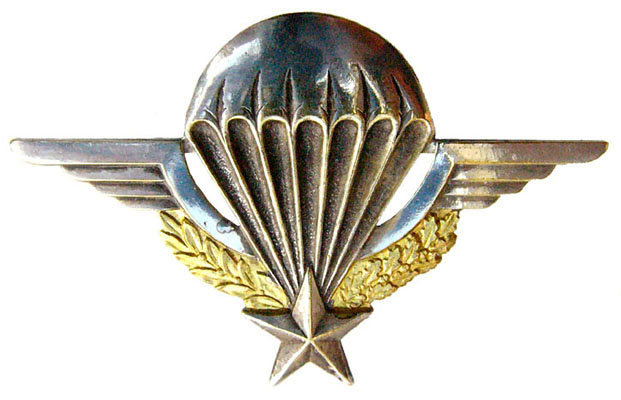
French Army Parachute Brevet.

The Archangel Saint Michael, patron of the French paratroopers is celebrated on September 29.

The prière du Para (Prayer of the Paratrooper) was written by André Zirnheld in 1938.

=== Insignias ===
Just like the paratrooper Brevet of the French Army, the insignia of French Paratroopers was created in 1946. The French Army Insignia of metropolitan Paratroopers represents a closed "winged armed dextrochere", meaning a "right winged arm" armed with a sword pointing upwards. The Insignia makes reference to the Patron of Paratroopers. In fact, the Insignia represents "the right Arm of Saint Michael", the Archangel which according to Liturgy is the "Armed Arm of God". This Insignia is the symbol of righteous combat and fidelity to superior missions. The French Army Insignia of Marine Infantry Paratroopers is backgrounded by a Marine Anchor.

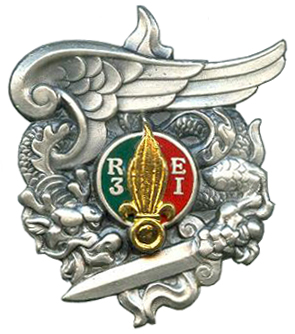
Co. Para du 3^{e} REI Insignia

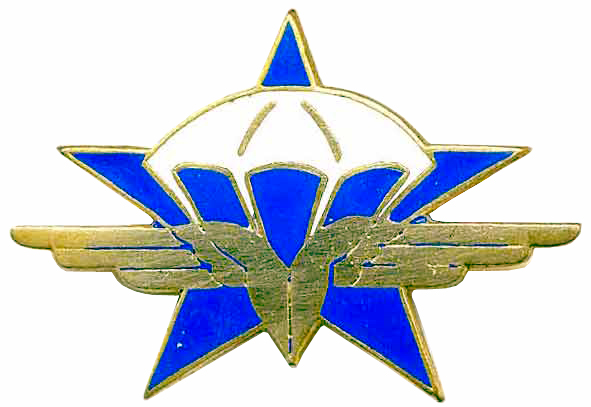
1st Parachute Chasseur Regiment Regimental Insignia

==== Regimental colors ====
bearing, stitched in gold letters in the folds, the following inscriptions:

The flag was presented to the 1st Battalion of the Regiment 14 April 1944 in Paceco Sicily.

==== Regimental song ====
The Regimental Song features:

Régiment de Rapaces
La gloire de tes anciens
Malgré le temps qui passe
Reste notre destin

Au Ménil et en Alsace
Les Paras du Premier
Ont déjà délivré la France
Rendu la liberté

Du Laos au Tonkin
Le bataillon sans fin
Dans les rizières et les Marais
fit la gloire du Premier

Sur la terre africaine
l'avion les a menés
Vers des combats et vers des peines
Qui furent notre fierté
Du Liban aux Balkans
Les Rapaces du premier
Ont toujours su verser leur sang
Pour rétablir la paix

Régiment de Rapaces
Reprenant le flambeau
Prêt à fondre sur la menace
Pour l'honneur du drapeau

Car sur la terre de France
Et ailleurs s'il le fallait
Nous resterions le fer de lance
De notre belle armée

==== Honours ====
===== Battle honours =====
- Vosges 1944
- Colmar 1945
- Indochine 1947–1950 1953–1954
- AFN 1952–1962

==== Flag decorations ====
- Croix de guerre 1939–1945 w/2 palms and its Fourragère.
- Croix de guerre des Théatres d'Opérations Extérieures w/7 palms and the Fourragère with ruban colors of the Legion of Honor.
- Croix de la Valeur Militaire w/2 palms with its Fourragère for actions lead in Afghanistan in 2007 and 2011.
- Croix de la Valeur Militaire w/ bronz palm for actions lead in Mali in 2013 within operation SERVAL.
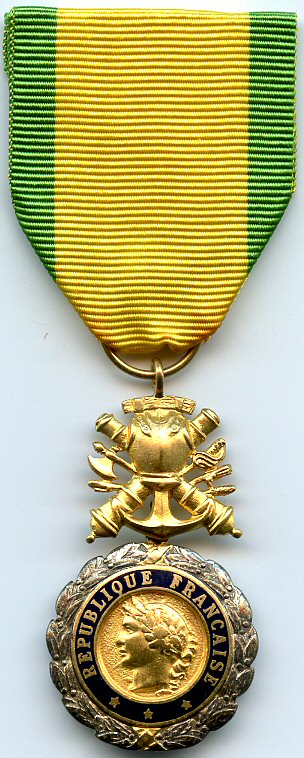
Médaille militaire

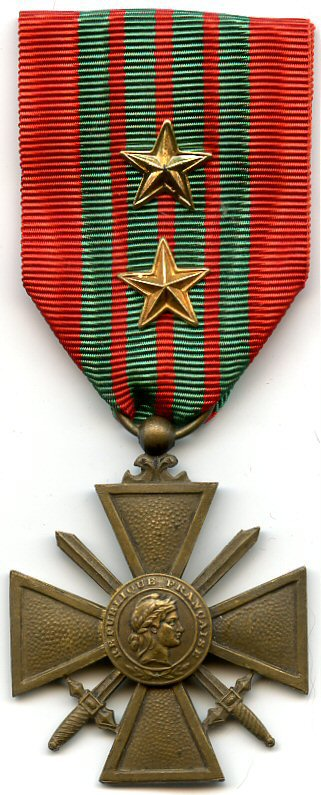
Croix de guerre 1939–1945

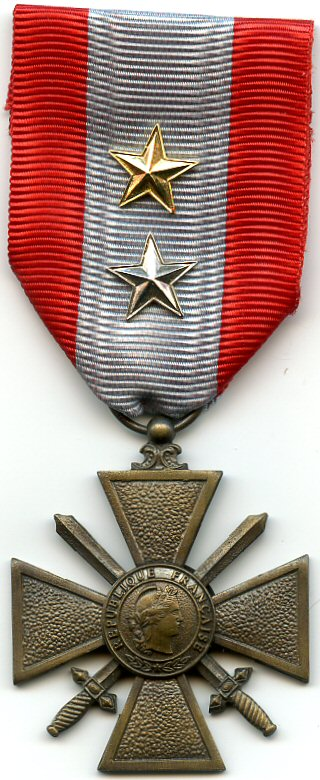
Croix de guerre des théâtres d'opérations extérieurs

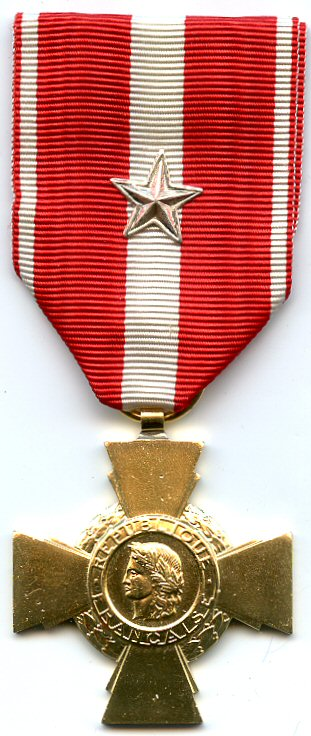
Cross for Military Valor

Mort pour la France following the 1983 Beirut barracks bombing:

===== 1st Parachute Chasseur Regiment Decorations =====
- Médaille militaire, awarded to the 3rd combat company of Captain Jacky Thomas of the 1st Parachute Chasseur Regiment.

===== 9th Parachute Chasseur Regiment Decorations =====
- Médaille militaire, awarded to 3 paratroopers of the 9th Parachute Chasseur Regiment.

== List of Air Infantry Commanders (1937–1954) ==
=== List of Airborne Infantry Commander (1937–1947) ===
Airborne Infantry Code Recognition	Commander	Rank	Tenure	Note
601st Airborne Infantry Group (601^{e} GIA)	Henri Sauvagnac	Captain	1937–1941	
602nd Airborne Infantry Group (602^{e} GIA)	Loizeau	Captain	1937–1941	
1st Air Infantry Company (1^{re} CIA no 1)	Sauvagnac	Captain	1941–1943	
1st Parachute Chasseur Battalion (1^{er} BCP no 1)	Sauvagnac	Captain	1943-1943	
1st Parachute Chasseur Regiment (1^{er} RCP)	Hartmann	Commandant	1943–1943	
1st Parachute Chasseur Regiment	Sauvagnac	Battalion Commander	1943-1943	
1st Parachute Chasseur Regiment	Frederic Geille	Colonel	1943–1944	
1st Parachute Chasseur Regiment	Jacques Faure	Lieutenant Colonel	1944–1945	2nd Battalion
1st Parachute Chasseur Regiment	Sauvagnac	Lieutenant Colonel	1945–1947	

=== List of Indochina Air Infantry Battalion Commander (1946–1954) ===
Indochina Air Infantry Battalions	Commander	Rank	Tenure	Note
1st Indochina Air Infantry Battalion (I)/ 1^{er} RCP	Vismes	Battalion Commander	1946–1948	
1st Battalion (I) /1^{er} RCP	Bastouil	Captain	1948–1949	
1st Battalion (I) /1^{er} RCP	Dangoumau	Battalion Commander	1954-1954	
2nd Indochina Air Infantry Battalion (II)/ 1^{er} RCP	Fossey-François	Battalion Commander	1948–1948	
2nd Battalion (II) /1^{er} RCP	Mollat	Captain	1948–1949	
2nd Battalion (II) /1^{er} RCP	Broizat	Captain	1949–1950	
2nd Battalion (II) /1^{er} RCP	Bréchignac	Battalion Commander	1952–1954	
2nd Battalion (II) /1^{er} RCP	Peaudecerf	Captain	1954–1954	
3rd Indochina Air Infantry Battalion (III)/ 1^{er} RCP	Fossey-François	Battalion Commander	1946–1948	
3rd Battalion (III) /1^{er} RCP	Ducruc	Battalion Commander	1954-1954	

== Foreign Legion companies (C.E.Ps) attached to 1st Parachute Chasseur Regiment (1^{er} RCP) ==
- Officers, Sous-Officiers and Legionnaires of the Parachute Company of the 3rd Foreign Infantry Regiment attached to 3rd Indochina Air Infantry Battalion (III)/ 1^{er} RCP.

== List of Regimental Commanders (1955–present) ==
(1955–1975) Tenure

- 1955–1958 : Lieutenant Colonel Georges Mayer
- 1958–1959 : Lieutenant Colonel Henri Coustaux
- 1959–1960 : Colonel Joseph Broizat
- 1960–1961 : Lieutenant Colonel Plassard
- 1961–1961 : Lieutenant Colonel Genestout
- 1961–1962 : Lieutenant Colonel Lafontaine
- 1962–1964 : Lieutenant Colonel Varennes
- 1964–1966 : Lieutenant Colonel Vernet
- 1966–1968 : Colonel Paul Aussaresses
- 1968–1970 : Lieutenant Colonel Rouquette
- 1970–1972 : Colonel Brenac
- 1972–1974 : Colonel de Biré

(1975–1995) Tenure

- 1974–1976 : Colonel Fayette
- 1976–1978 : Colonel Noel Chazarain
- 1978–1980 : Colonel Sengeisen
- 1980–1982 : Colonel Aumonier
- 1982–1984 : Colonel Cardinal
- 1984–1986 : Colonel Rioufol
- 1986–1988 : Colonel Vola
- 1988–1990 : Colonel de Loustal
- 1990–1992 : Colonel Maupoume
- 1992–1994 : Colonel Leroy
- 1994–1996 : Colonel Damay

(1995–present) Tenure

- 1996–1998 : Colonel Le Chevallier
- 1998–1999 : Lieutenant Colonel Leclere
- 1999–1999 : Colonel Servera
- 1999–2001 : Colonel Baillaud
- 2001–2003 : Colonel Thuet
- 2003–2005 : Colonel Salaun
- 2005–2007 : Lieutenant Colonel Collet
- 2007–2009 : Colonel Frédéric Blachon
- 2009–2011 : Colonel Renaud Sénétaire
- 2011–2013 : Colonel Antoine de Loustal
- 2013–2015 : Colonel Bruno Helluy
- 2015–20** : Colonel Olivier Vidal

== Chasseurs Officers, Legion Officers, Chasseurs and Legionnaires ==
- Jean Bréchignac
- Philippe Erulin
- Pierre Segrétain
- Paul Arnaud de Foïard

== See also ==
- 24th Airborne Division
- 25th Airborne Division
- Pierre Jeanpierre
- List of French paratrooper units
- 1st Foreign Parachute Regiment
- 2nd Foreign Parachute Regiment
- 10th Parachute Division (France)
- 25th Parachute Division (France)
- 1st Parachute Hussar Regiment
