= 9th Parachute Chasseur Regiment =

- 9^{e} Régiment de Chasseurs Parachutistes
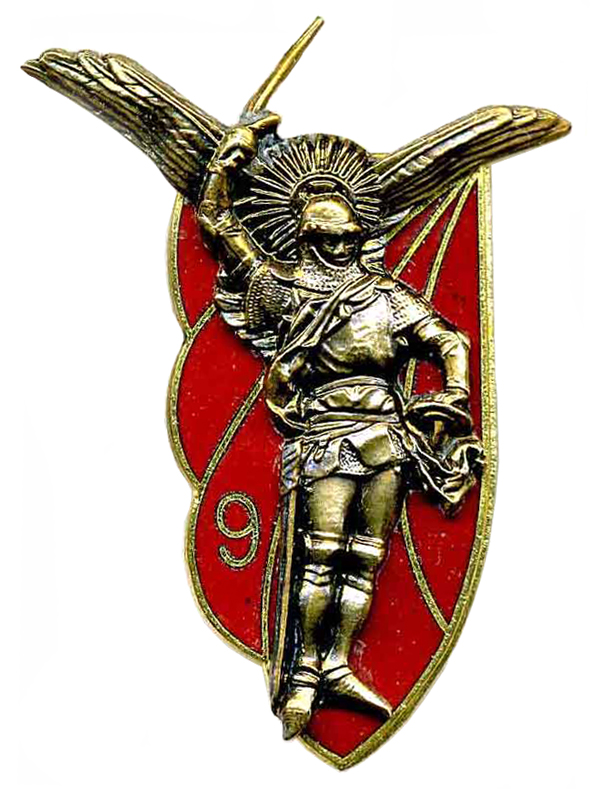
- Regimental insignia
- Active: 9th Infantry Regiment (1562 - 1956); 9^{e} RCP (1956 – 1999)
- Country: France
- Branch: French Army
- Type: 9th Infantry Regiment IV/18^{e}RIPC French Airborne Regiment (1956)
- Part of: 10th Parachute Division 25th Parachute Division 11th Parachute Brigade
- Garrison/HQ: Quartier Capitaine-Beaumont, Pamiers
- Motto(s): Normandie, en Avant ! (Normandy, Straight Ahead !)
- Anniversaries: Saint Michael, September 29
- Engagements: World War I; World War II; Algerian War; Lebanese Civil War; United Nations Interim Force in Lebanon (1978-1999); Multinational Force in Lebanon

Commanders
- Notable commanders: Jean Bréchignac
- Abbreviation: 9^{e} RCP

The 9th Parachute Chasseur Regiment (French: 9^{e} Régiment de Chasseurs Parachutistes, 9^{e} RCP) was an airborne unit of the French Army that was part of the French Airborne Units and all three histories of the 10th Parachute Division, 25th Parachute Division and the 11th Parachute Brigade. It was formed during the Algerian War and fought its most notable engagement at the Battle of Frontiers in 1958 at Souk Ahras during which the sacrifice of Captain's Beaumont 3rd combat company earned naming the garrison of the 9th Parachute Chasseur in his honor. During the Algerian War, the 9th Parachute Chasseur Regiment relieved the 1st Parachute Chasseur Regiment (1^{er} RCP) and became part of the 25th Parachute Division. The regiment did not take part in the 1961 Algiers Putsch. The regiment took part in numerous overseas operations before merging in 1999. The regiment was the heir to the traditions, battle honours and decorations of the 9th Infantry Regiment (French: 9^{e} Régiment d'Infanterie, 9^{e} RI) created during the Ancien Régime.

== History since 1956 ==
The 9th Parachute Chasseur Regiment was created on 1 June 1956 in Algeria from the 4th Battalion of the 18th Choc Parachute Chasseur Regiment 18^{e} RIPC and received the standard from Division Commander General Henri Sauvagnac (1956-1958) in Batna on 11 November.

The parachute regiment did not take part in the 1961 Algiers putsch and after the end of the Algerian War, the regiment moved to Toulouse on mainland France. The regiment later took part in numerous operations in Lebanon. The parachute regiment served extensively within the United Nations Interim Force in Lebanon (UNIFL) and the Multinational Force in 1983 where the regiment lost 3 paratroopers during the 1983 Beirut barracks bombing. Three years later, the parachute regiment was quick to take part again in the United Nations Interim Force Lebanon in 1986 and 1998-1999 while also participating in other foreign operations. The 9th parachute regiment merged in 1999 as part of a restructuring of the 11th Parachute Brigade of the French Army.

=== Timeline ===
- 1956 : Regiment was created on June 1 as the 9th Parachute Chasseur Regiment from the 18th Choc Parachute Chasseur Regiment (18^{e} RIPC) in Algeria.
- 1968 : the 9th Parachute Chasseur Regiment based in Saint-Sulpice-la-Pointe deployed in a formed battalion to New Caledonia.
- 1979 : Reconnaissance and Support Company of the 9th Parachute Chasseur Regiment deployed to Southern Lebanon on a peacekeeping mission under the United Nations Force Protection (UNIFIL) for a period of 6 months.
- 1981 : Installation of the 9th Parachute Chasseur Regiment at base quartier Capitaine-Beaumont in Pamiers
- 1983 : The 9th Parachute Chasseur Regiment participated in maintaining peace order in Southern Lebanon and particularly in Beirut. Three paratroopers died in the 1983 Beirut barracks bombings.
- 1986 : Within the battle contingent forming the peacekeeping mission in Lebanon under the United Nations; the 9th Parachute Chasseur Regiment under command orders of Colonel Godinot engaged in several battle clashes against armed groups.
- 1987-1999 : The 9th Parachute Chasseur Regiment deployed to the four corners of the globe engaged in numerous foreign military operations - Gabon, Central Africa Republic, Tchad, Burundi, Saudi Arabia, Kuwait, Ex-Yugoslavia, Irak, Turkey as much as in the Overseas departments and territories of France.
- 1993 : The 9th Parachute Chasseur Regiment deployed to Mogadishu, Somalia.
- 1994 : The 9th Parachute Chasseur Regiment under command orders of Colonel Oberto under BATINF 2 engaged in Sarajevo under mandate United Nations Force Protection.
- 1998 - 1999 : The 9th Parachute Chasseur Regiment engaged the regiment's Reconnaissance and Support Company one more time in maintaining order in Southern Lebanon in United Nations Interim Force in Lebanon (UNIFIL).
- 1999 : The 9th Parachute Chasseur Regiment merged with the 1st Parachute Chasseur Regiment part of the restructuring of the 11th Parachute Brigade.

== Traditions ==
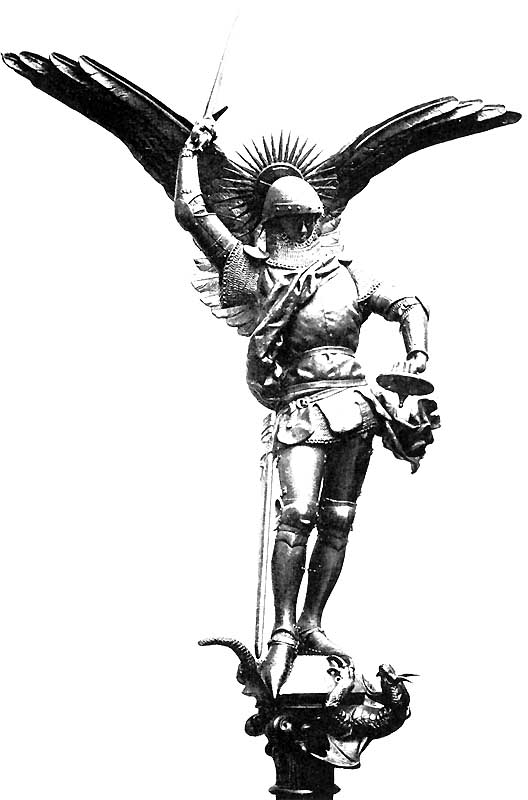
The Archangel Michael featured in Mont Saint-Michel and the Insignia of the 9th Parachute Chasseur Regiment.

Except for the Legionnaires of the 1er REG, 2^{e} REG, 2^{e} REP that continue to wear the Green Beret; the remainder of the French army metropolitan and marine paratroopers forming the 11th Parachute Brigade wear the Red Beret.

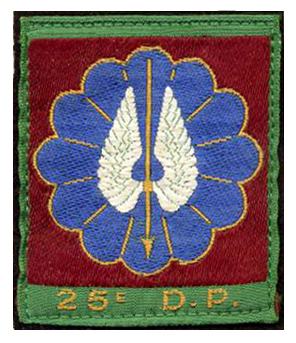
Shoulder Arm Insignia of the 25th Parachute Division of France

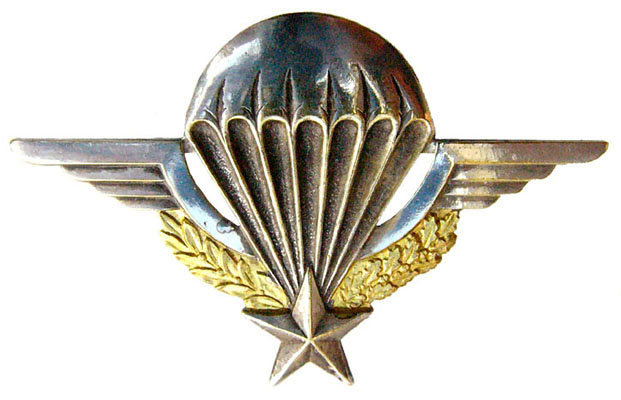
French Parachute Brevet.

The Archangel Saint Michael, patron of the French paratroopers is celebrated on September 29.

The prière du Para (Prayer of the Paratrooper) was written by André Zirnheld in 1938.

=== Insignias ===
Just like the paratrooper Brevet of the French Army; the Insignia of French Paratroopers was created in 1946. The French Army Insignia of metropolitan Paratroopers represents a closed "winged armed dextrochere", meaning a "right winged arm" armed with a sword pointing upwards. The Insignia makes reference to the Patron of Paratroopers. In fact, the Insignia represents "the right Arm of Saint Michael", the Archangel which according to Liturgy is the "Armed Arm of God". This Insignia is the symbol of righteous combat and fidelity to superior missions. The French Army Insignia of Marine Infantry Paratroopers is backgrounded by a Marine Anchor.

The paratroopers of the regiment wear the red berets with the Fourragère with colors of the Croix de Guerre.

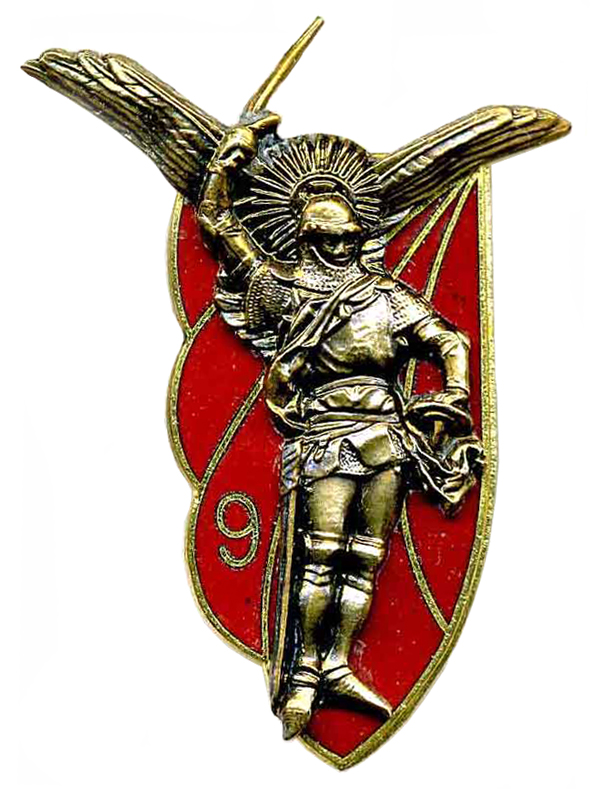
Insignia of the 9th Parachute Chasseur Regiment

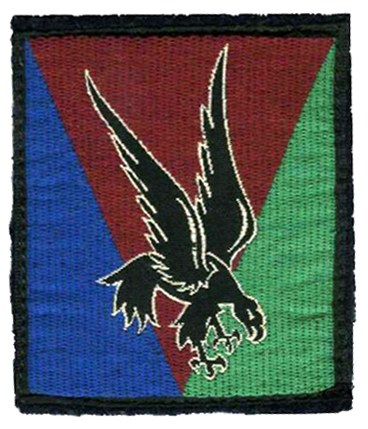
Shoulder Arm Insignia of the 10th Parachute Division of France

=== Regimental Colors ===
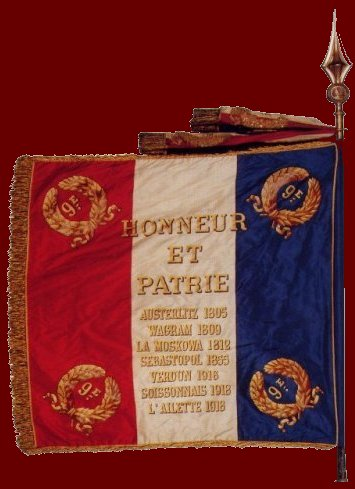

=== Regimental Song ===
The regimental song is "En avant Normandie".

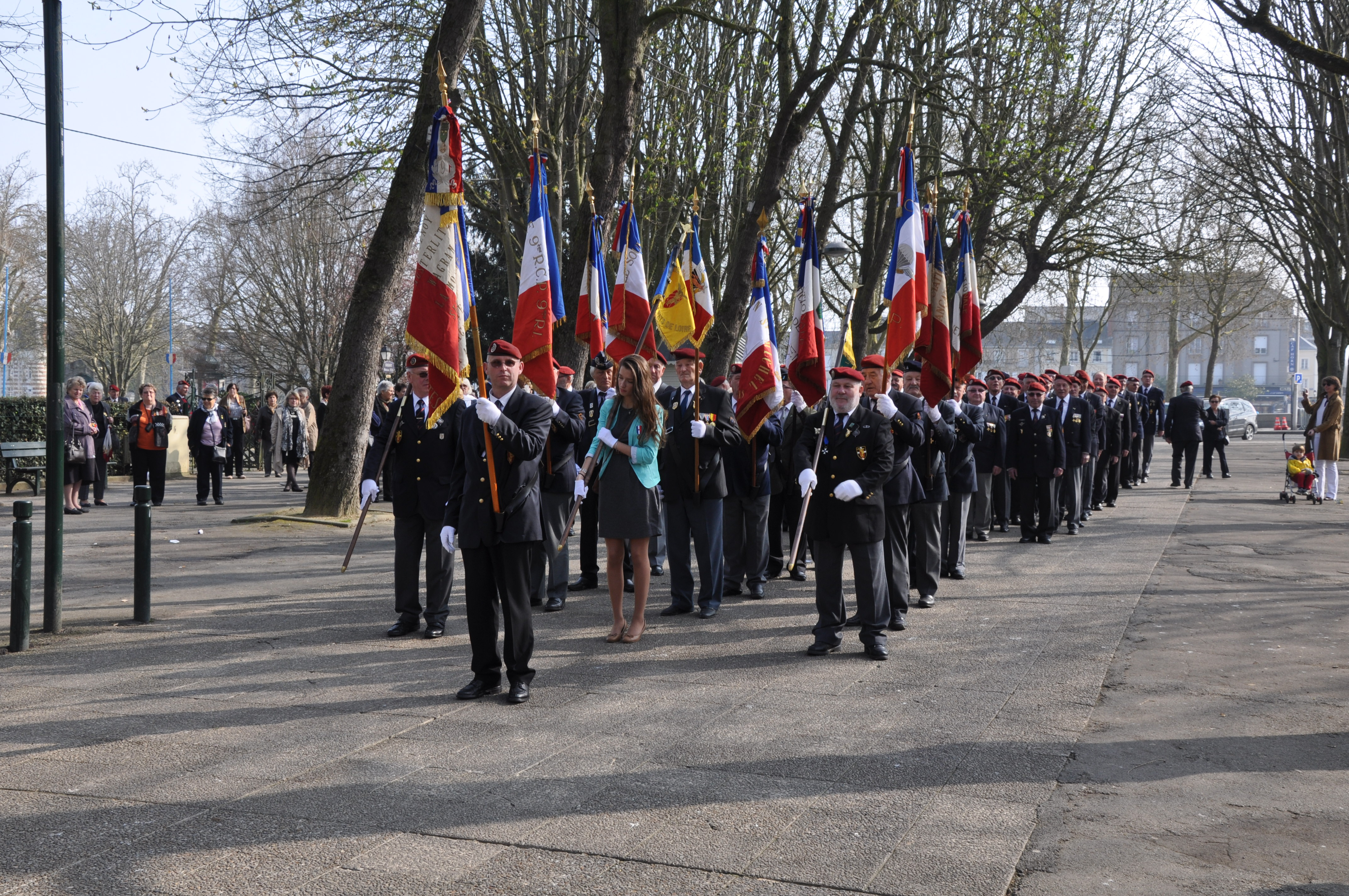
the 9th Parachute Chasseur Regiment at Laval, Mayenne for the general assembly in March 2012.

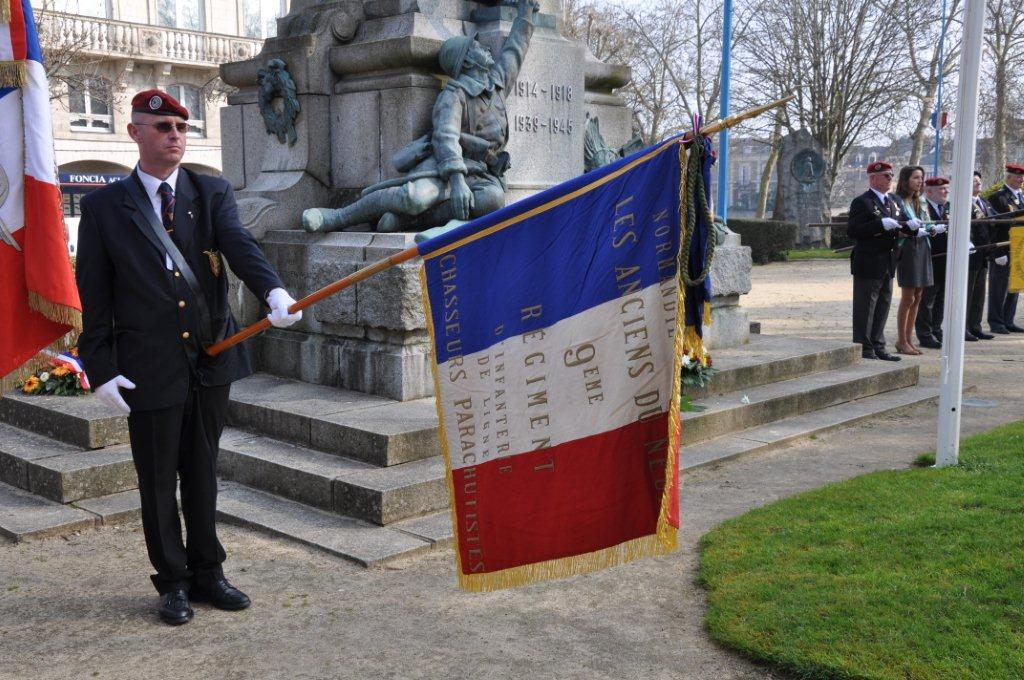
Ancien Flag honors at a Ceremony

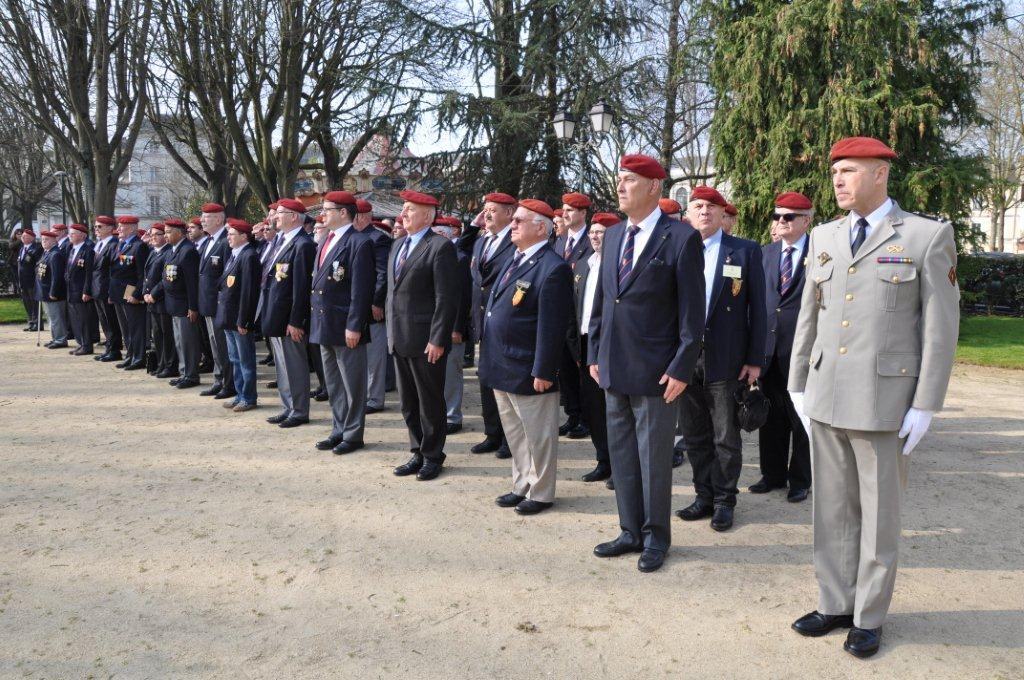
Ceremony held by the old combatants of the 9th Parachute Chasseur Regiment at Laval in March 2012

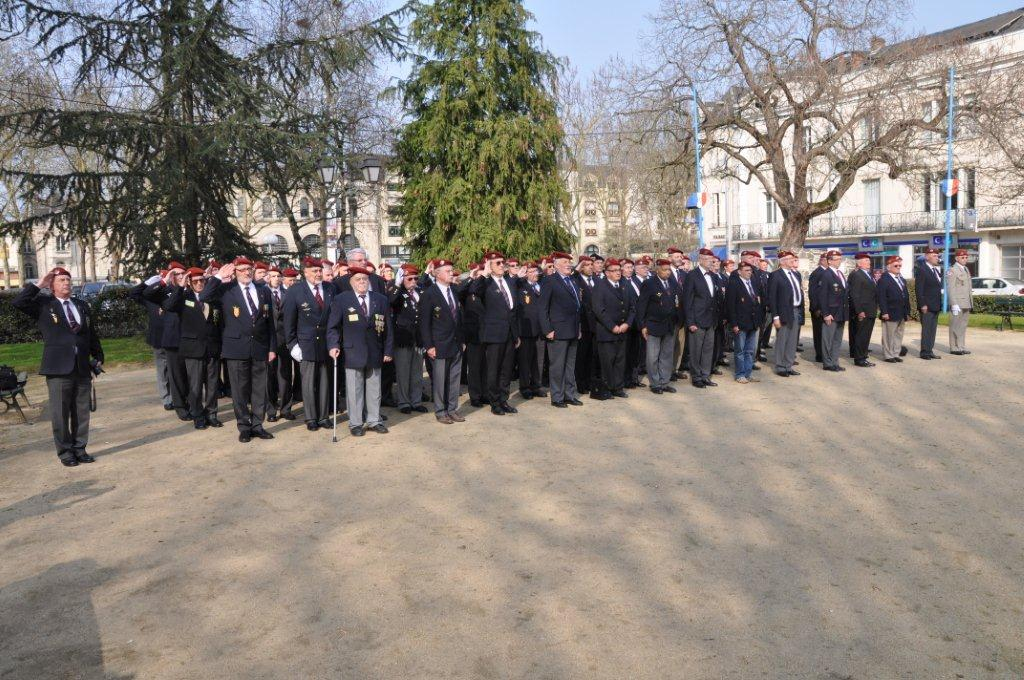
Ceremony held by the old combatants of the 9th Parachute Chasseur Regiment at Laval in March 2012

=== Decorations ===
- Croix de guerre 1914–1918 with three palms, one vermeil star and one argent star
- Gold Medal of the City of Milan
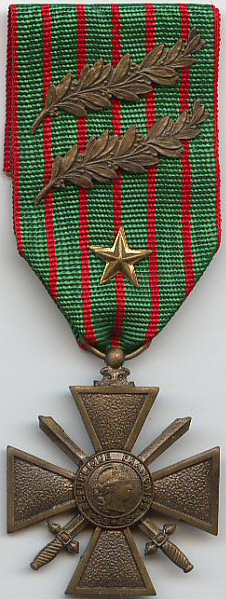
Croix de guerre 1914-1918

Médaille d'or de la ville de Milan

=== Honours ===
==== Battle honours ====
9th Infantry Regiment

- Austerlitz 1805
- Wagram 1809
- La Moskova 1812
- Sebastopol 1856
- Verdun 1916
- Soissonnais 1918
- L’Ailette 1918

9th Parachute Regiment

- AFN 1952–1962

== Regimental Commanders ==
Name	Rank	Tenure	Note
Buchoud	Lieutenant Colonel	1956-1959	Operations with Pierre Jeanpierre and 1st Foreign Parachute Regiment 1^{er} REP
Jean Bréchignac	Lieutenant Colonel	1959-1961	
Defert	Lieutenant Colonel	1961	
Cordier	Lieutenant Colonel	1961-1965	
Audema	Lieutenant Colonel	1965-1967	
Barthez	Lieutenant Colonel	1967-1969	
Liron	Lieutenant Colonel	1969-1971	
Lartigue	Lieutenant Colonel	1971-1973	
Guichard	Lieutenant Colonel	1973-1975	
Granger	Lieutenant Colonel	1975-1977	
Bechu	Lieutenant Colonel	1977-1979	
De Courreges	Lieutenant Colonel	1979-1981	
Loridon	Lieutenant Colonel	1981-1983	
Pormente	Lieutenant Colonel	1983-1985	
Godinot	Lieutenant Colonel	1985-1987	
Pinatel	Lieutenant Colonel	1987-1989	
Champtiaux	Lieutenant Colonel	1989-1991	
Amarger	Lieutenant Colonel	1991-1993	
Oberto	Lieutenant Colonel	1993-1995	
Buchoud	Lieutenant Colonel	1995-1997	
Servera	Lieutenant Colonel	1997-1999	

== See also ==
- Claude Barrès
