= Gold Medal of the City of Milan =

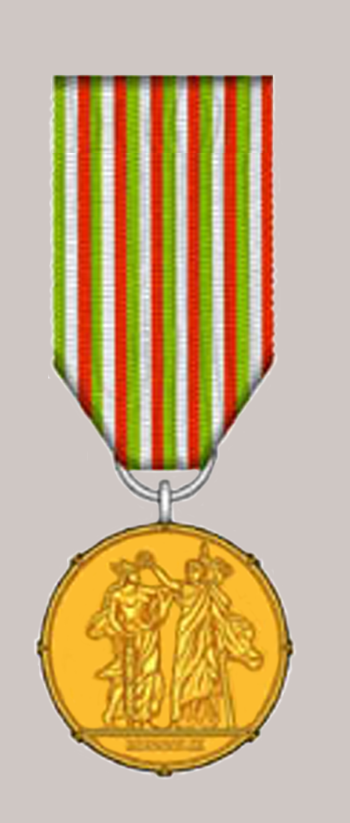

The Gold Medal of the City of Milan (French: Médaille d'or de la Ville de Milan) was a French medal issued in 1909 to commemorate the fiftieth anniversary of France's 1859 Italian campaign, an intervention in the Second Italian War of Independence, it was predominantly awarded to the colours of French regiments that had participated in the campaign.

== Regiment recipients ==
- 9th Hussar Regiment
- 12th Cuirassier Regiment
- 13th Parachute Dragoon Regiment
- 1st Foreign Regiment
- 2nd Foreign Infantry Regiment
- Foreign Legion Pioneers
- 1st Tirailleur Regiment
