= Camp Warehouse =

International Security Assistance Force during the War in Afghanistan

- Kabul, Kabul Province; Near Kabul in Afghanistan
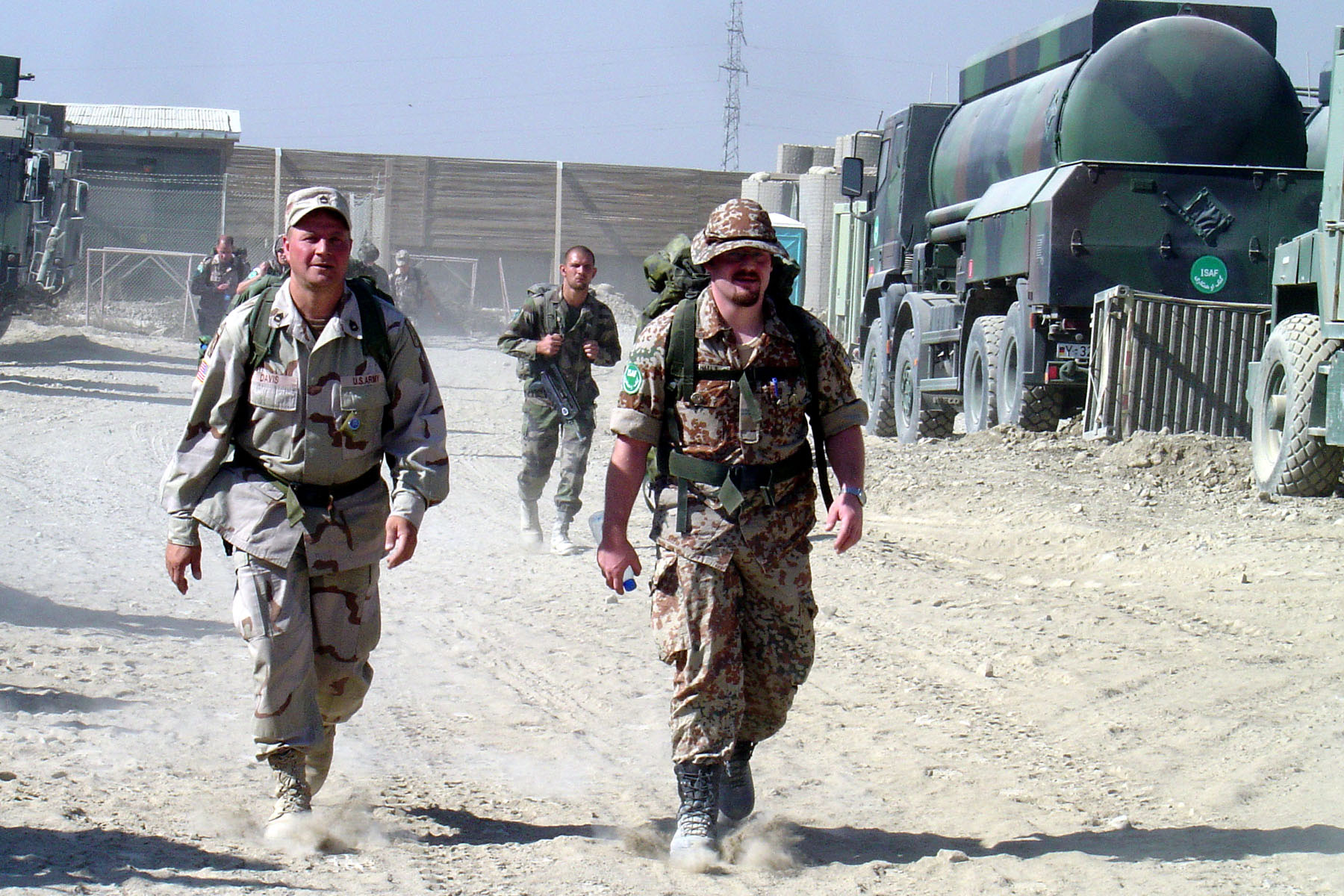
- American and Danish soldiers at Camp Warehouse, Afghanistan

Site information
- Type: Military camp
- Owner: International Security Assistance Force
- Condition: Abandoned

Location
- Coordinates: 34°32′29″N 69°18′16″E

Site history
- Built: 2002
- In use: 2002–2021
- Fate: Taken by Islamic Army of Afghanistan during the Fall of Kabul
- Battles/wars: War in Afghanistan

Camp Warehouse was an International Security Assistance Force (ISAF) during the War in Afghanistan (2001–2021). It was located 10 km east of Kabul, Kabul Province in Afghanistan. Initially constructed by German soldiers, Camp Warehouse was a major coordination centre for ISAF, hosting detachments from multiple countries. The base was used to co-ordinate multi-national forces in and around Kabul hosting equipment from a large number of countries in the multi-national force, as well as maintaining an ISAF Signal Operations Centre used for managing ISAF air sorties and patrols.

Camp Warehouse was additionally the site of the German built Camp Warehouse Field Hospital, run by the Multinational Medical Task Force. The hospital operated on more than 600 Afghan men, women and children.

== History ==
The facility was largely abandoned following the drawdown of ISAF forces in 2014. Following the Fall of Kabul to the Taliban in 2021, the status of Camp Warehouse is unknown, but is presumed to be abandoned.

== Garrison information ==
=== Former occupants ===
- Austria
- Bulgaria
- Canada
- Croatia
- Netherlands
- [Norway, or] Norwegian soldiers from Forsvarets Spesialkommando and Norwegian Intelligence Service had a base within Camp Warehouse.
- New Zealand soldiers from the NZSAS in Kabul were headquartered at camp Warehouse.
- France
- Germany
- Georgia
- Hungary
- Portugal
- Turkey
- Finland
- Denmark

== Current use ==
The current use of Camp Warehouse is unknown following the capture of Kabul by Taliban forces. However, no foreign presence remains garrisoned at the camp.

== Legacy ==
A memorial to 26 German and other coalition soldiers killed as part of commitments to ISAF from 2002 to 2007 was initially located at Camp Warehouse. In November 2014, this memorial was moved to the "Forest of remembrance", located at the German Joint Forces Command in the vicinity of Potsdam.
