= 13th Parachute Dragoon Regiment =

- 13^{e} Régiment de Dragons Parachutistes
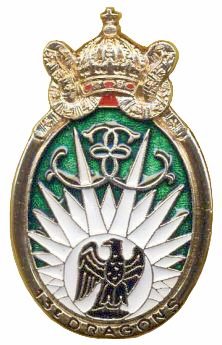
- Active: October 4, 1676 – present
- Country: France
- Branch: French Army
- Type: Special Forces
- Role: Special Reconnaissance
- Part of: French Army Special Forces Command
- Garrison/HQ: Martignas-sur-Jalle
- Mottos: Au-delà du possible (Beyond the possible)
- Abbreviation: 13^{e} RDP

The 13^{e} Régiment de Dragons Parachutistes (English: 13th Parachute Dragoon Regiment) or 13^{e} RDP is a special reconnaissance unit of the French Army. It belongs to the French Army Special Forces Command, and therefore to the Special Operations Command. The regiment is based in Martignas-sur-Jalle.

First raised in 1676 in the form of a regiment of dragoons (mounted infantry) during the Ancien Regime by the Marquis de Barbezières in Languedoc, this cavalry regiment, one of the oldest, adopted the appellation of 13^{e} Régiment de dragons (13th Dragoon Regiment) during the reorganization of the French cavalry units in 1791. The regiment was then transformed into an armoured unit in 1936, then an airborne-capable reconnaissance unit in 1952.

== Creation and lineage ==
Like many regiments in European militaries of the 17th and 18th centuries the regiment often changed name to reflect its current commander or patron.

- 1676, 4 October: formation of the regiment in Languedoc by the Marquis de Barbezières, as Dragoon de Barbezières.
- 1714: designated as Dragoon de Goesbriand.
- 1724, 12 December: designated as Dragoon de Condé.
- 1744: designated as Dragoon de Bartillat
- 1774: designated as Dragoon Comte-de-Provence, then, in the same year designated as Dragoon de Monsieur.
- 1791: designated as 13^{e} Dragoon Regiment.
- 1815: dissolution of the regiment after the Napoleonic wars.
- 1855: Reformation of a Dragoon regiment designated as the Dragoon Regiment of the Empress in reference to The Empress Eugénie de Montijo.
- 1870: re-designated as the 13^{e} Dragoon Regiment.
- 1936: Mechanized as an armoured regiment, receiving Somua and Hotchkiss tanks.
- 1940: again disbanded, after losing 90% of its strength.
- 1944: New formation
- 1946: Regiment disbanded post-WW2
- 1952: reorganization and re-trained as the 13^{e} Parachute Dragoon Regiment.

== Campaign history since 1792 ==
13th Dragoon Regiment
(1792 to 1815)
- 1792: Valmy, Vouziers
- 1793: Armée de Belgique, La Roer
- 1794: Armée du Nord, Grave, Capture of Breda
- 1797: Rhine Crossing, Diersheim, Hasslach
- 1799: Frauenfeld, Rapperschwyl, First Battle of Zurich
- 1800: Fregelhurts, Gorges, Enfer, sieges of Ingolstadt and Hohenlinden
- 1805: Crossing the Rhine, Crossing the Danube, Enns, Hollabrun, Austerlitz
- 1806: Prussian and Polish Campaigns, Jena, Nasielsk, Pułtusk
- 1809: Peninsular War, La Corogne, Oporto, Crossing the Tage
- 1811: Ciudad-Real
- 1812: La Rosas, Borodino
- 1813: German Campaign, Leipzig
- 1814: French Campaign, Vauchamps, Mormant, Saint-Dizier
- 1815: Wavre, Battle of Rocquencourt

Dragoon Regiment of The Empress
(1855 to 1870)

- 1870: Metz

13th Dragoon Regiment
(1870 to 1945)

- 1870: Siege of Paris
- 1914–1918: Frontiers, Marne, Ypres, St Mihiel
- 1939–1940: Hannut, Dunkirk, France 1940
- 1944–45: Operations Vénérable and Mousquetaire

13th Parachute Dragoon Regiment 13^{e} R.D.P
(1952 – present)

- 1956–1961: Algeria
- 1977: Mauritania
- 1978–1980: Chad
- 1978: Zaïre
- 1979: Central African Republic
- 1980–1986: RCA
- 1983–1986: Chad
- 1986–1992: Chad
- 1986: Togo
- 1990–1991: Kuwait
- 1991: Rwanda
- 1991: Zaïre
- 1992: Yugoslavia
- 1992–1993: Somalia
- 1993: Cambodia
- 1994: Rwanda
- 1995: Comores
- 1996–1997: RCA
- 1997: Albania
- 1998: Gabon
- 1999: Macedonia
- 1999: Kosovo
- 2001: Afghanistan, Cameroon, Lebanon, Mali, Ivory Coast

== History since 1945 ==
=== Post–World War II ===
After World War II the regiment was designated as a parachute unit in 1952 and witnessed yet another transformation. The regiment first integrated the 25th Parachute Division constituted in June 1956, following which the regiment was then transferred on July 1, 1957, to the 10th Parachute Division during the Algerian War. From May 1, 1963, to July 31, 1963, the regiment was part of the 11th Light Intervention Division 11^{e} DLI.

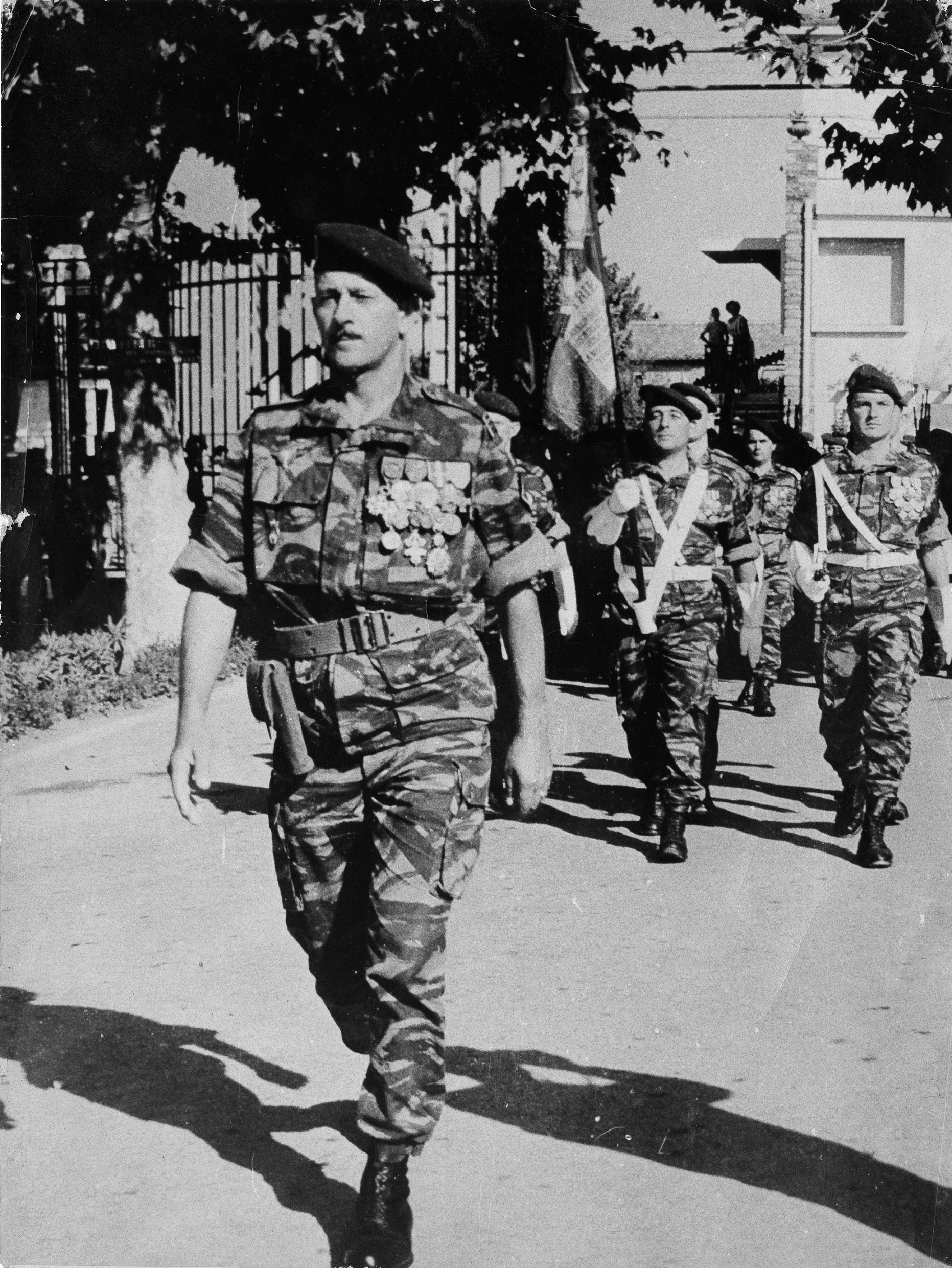
Jedburgh Larrieu Jean-second in command at the head of the 13th RDP on his return to France in Castres, he parades the regiment in camouflage uniform and singing-19620826

The 13^{e} RDP was transformed into a long-range recon unit. During the Cold War, the main mission of the 13^{e} RDP was to provide intelligence for the 1st Army, while each company of the 1st Marine Infantry Parachute Regiment 1^{er} RPIMa would provide intelligence for one Army Corps.

Since the end of the Cold War, the 1st Marine Infantry Parachute Regiment 1^{e} RPIMa has become a direct-action unit while the 13^{e} RDP specialized in reconnaissance/surveillance operations in hostile environment, gathering intelligence for special operations. In a way they're similar to the role of the U.S. Army Long Range Surveillance Detachment or Long Range Surveillance Company.

The 13^{e} RDP took part in the Gulf War. This was highlighted when three operators were captured by the Iraqis in late 1990. The 13^{e} RDP was, along with other French units, heavily involved in the Kosovo War and used tactics and technology to force Serbian armour to attempt to engage Kosovo Liberation Army and other Allied forces in the open, which enabled them to be destroyed by Allied bombing, particularly by the United States Air Force and the Royal Air Force. The 13^{e} RDP also contributed to the capture of Momčilo Krajišnik in 2001 by close range recons.

== Mission ==
The mission for the regiment is to acquire human intelligence at any time and in any hostile environments (aquatic, cold mountain, equatorial forest, desert), behind enemy lines, using small autonomous and discreet units, able to position itself closer to acquire intelligence, and transmit. For this kind of mission, units of the 13th practice what they call "hideout", that is to say, operations camouflage living areas for observation and transmission, but also evolved into more modern and urban modes of action (installation of cameras / sensors and remote viewing). The regiment is officially in charge of the research of strategic intelligence.

The high skill level of 13^{e} RDP operatives in special reconnaissance means that they are often requested by other forces. The Groupe d'Intervention de la Gendarmerie Nationale keeps a close relationship with the 13^{e} RDP to train its gendarmes in forward recon for hostage rescue operations in hostile environments. The Équipes d'Observation en Profondeur (EOP, forward control teams) of French artillery regiments use the standard operating procedures of the 13^{e} RDP. 13^{e} RDP operators are also reported to be highly requested to join the Service Action of the Direction générale de la sécurité extérieure (D.G.S.E, French Intelligence Service).

== 13^{e} RDP and Intelligence role ==
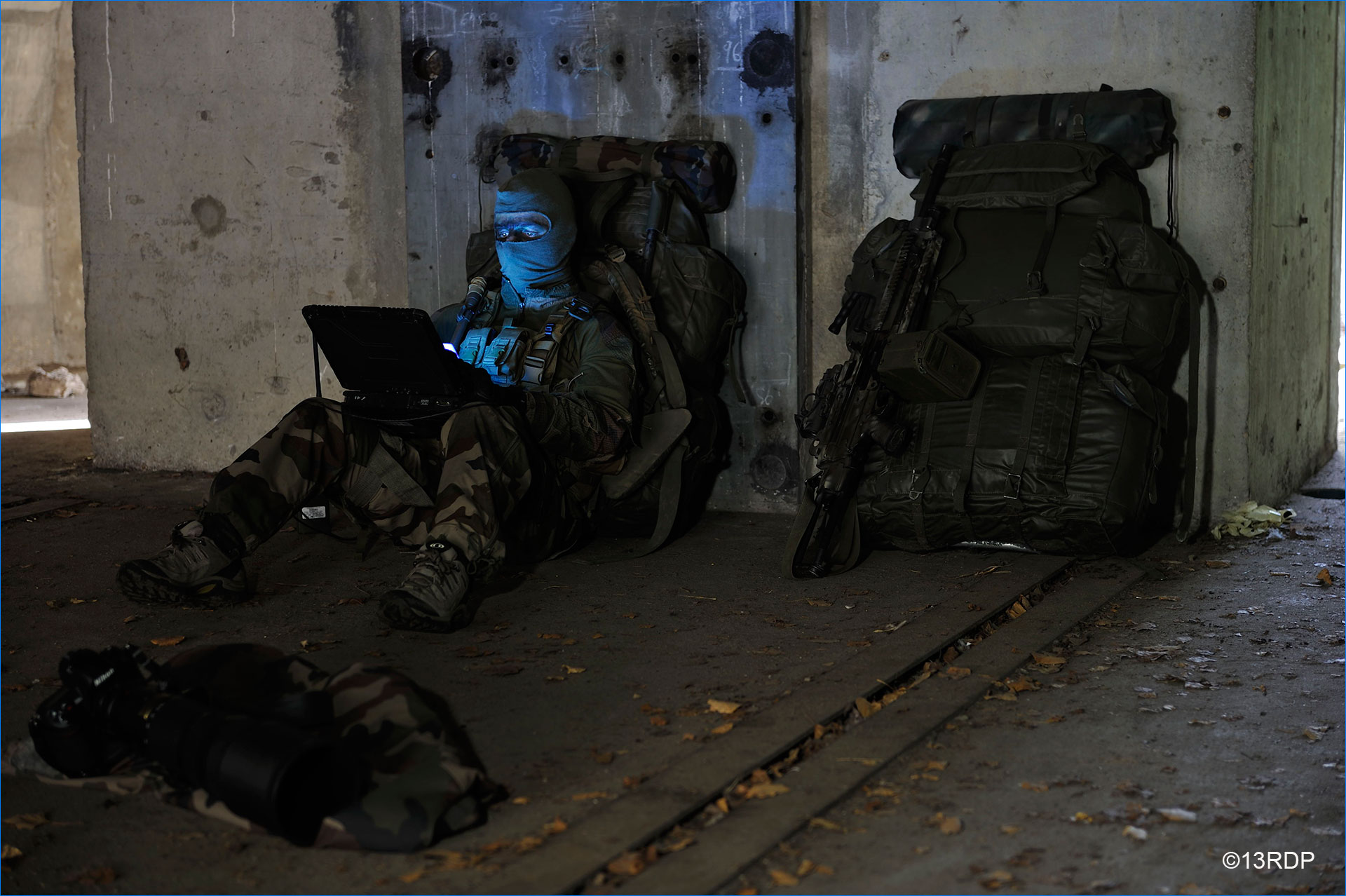
13th Parachute Dragoon Regiment Scouts

In April 1960, the French Army in Germany decided to form an experimental long range intelligence company, the 7th company of Commandos, based on earlier work in Indochina and Algeria. The 7th company developed survival and reconnaissance procedures for operating behind enemy lines. These methods and procedures and personnel are absorbed by the 13^{e} RDP. This led to the 13^{e} RDP from 1963 being formally tasked with its current 'Long Range Reconnaissance Patrol' missions.

Finally in 1968, the French Army laid out a plan for conversion of the regiment completely to its new task. Pending the creation of the new 1st Army in 1972, EMA decided to implement this plan, restructuring the regiment. The 13^{e} RDP is then made available to the Army to be used in Germany in a stay-behind role in case of war.

The Regiment was initially subordinate to the BRGE (French Army's military intelligence and electronic warfare Brigade). Nowadays, the 13^{e} RDP is part of the French Special Operations Command

=== Organization ===
The Regiment is currently composed of seven squadrons:

- Four "search", or intelligence, squadrons. They provide the Regiment's recon teams.
- One long-range communications squadron. They provide a secure communications link between deployed recon teams and higher headquarters.
- One exploitation squadron.
- One training squadron. They are responsible for providing in-house training courses and certifying new unit members.

=== Equipment ===
13^{e} RDP is equipped with standard French Army material, but has access to specialized weapons and equipment when needed. In the event that a "silenced" weapon is required teams can be equipped with MP5SD submachine guns. When heavy fire power is considered necessary, recon teams are known to carry the M-203 40 mm grenade launcher, and the 5.56mm Minimi LMG. Vehicle mounted teams may arm their vehicles with a variety of heavy weapons including Browning .50 cal heavy machine guns, US MK-19 40 mm automatic grenade launchers, and light machine guns.

The vehicle-mounted teams are equipped with Panhard VPSs, heavily armed P-4 Jeeps and Peugeot motorcycles.

=== Training ===
Each member of the 13^{e} RDP are trained in the hand-to-hand combat system of Techniques of Close Operational Interventions (French: Technique d'intervention opérationnelle rapprochée, TIOR) which is a mix of Krav Maga & boxing

== Traditions ==
=== Motto ===
The motto of the 13^{e} RDP, is Au-delà du possible ("Beyond the possible").

=== Insignia ===
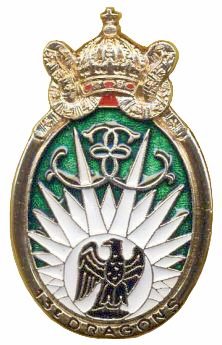
13^{e} R.D.P

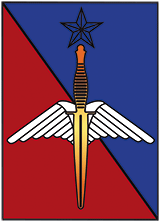

=== Honours ===
==== Battle honours ====
- Valmy 1792
- Hohenlinden 1800
- Austerlitz 1805
- Iéna 1806
- La Moskowa 1812
- Ypres 1914
- Verdun 1916
- AFN 1952–1962

=== Decorations ===
The regimental colours of the 13th Parachute Dragoon Regiment are decorated with:

- Croix de guerre 1939–1945 with 1 palm.
- Croix de la Valeur militaire with 3 palms.
- Gold Medal of the City of Milan

== Personalities who served in the regiment ==
- Pierre Denis de La Châtre (1763–1820), colonel of the Empire;
- Jean Charles Edmond Wattel (1878–1957), future general of Cadre noir;
- Jean Larrieu (1912–1969), Jedburgh then parachuted into Laos in 1945 for the Action Service of the DGER supported by Force 136, second in command between 1961 and 1963. The only Jedburgh within the Regiment, he was integrated at the end of 1960 so that on his return, in France at Castres, then at Dieuze), he could accompany it in its transformation into an in-depth intelligence unit by transmitting and training it in all the combat techniques learned in 1944 within the Special Forces at Milton Hall Jedburghs in England, in 1945–46 within the Action Service of the DGER with Force 136 in Laos (model for the GCMA) and within the Stay-behind networks to which he belonged: parachuting far behind enemy lines, hiding, camouflage, observations, transmissions by long-distance coded radio links, return and extractions, etc. He was the only one in the regiment to have really .
- Daniel Divry (1912–2001), Compagnon de la Libération, director of training at the 13th RDP.
- Maxime Le Forestier did his national service there in 1969. Reluctant about military matters, he composed the anti-militarist song Parachutiste after having fulfilled his obligations under the flag.

== See also ==
- List of French paratrooper units
