= 10th Parachute Division (France) =

- 10^{e} Division Parachutiste
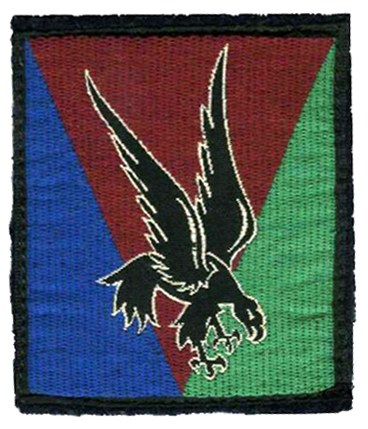
- 10^{e} DP Shoulder Arm Insignia
- Active: 1956–1961
- Country: France
- Branch: French Army
- Type: Airborne forces
- Size: Division
- Anniversaries: Saint Michael, September 29
- Engagements: Suez Crisis; Algerian War

Commanders
- Notable commanders: Jacques Massu (1956–1959); Jean Gracieux (1959–1960); Bernard Saint-Hillier (1960–1961)

Insignia
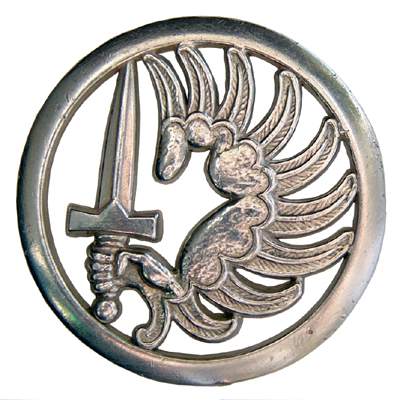
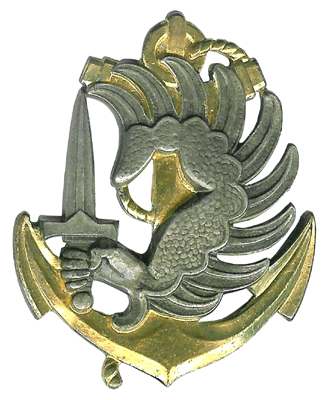
- Identification symbol
- Abbreviation: 10^{e} D.P

The 10th Parachute Division (French: 10^{e} Division Parachutiste, 10^{e} D.P) was an airborne forces division of the French Army. It consisted predominantly of infantry troops, and specialized in air assault and airborne operations, artillery observer, close-quarters battle, combined arms, counter-battery fire, counterinsurgency in desert warfare, maneuver warfare, military logistics, raiding with small unit tactics, and reconnaissance.

Established in 1956, it fought primarily in the Suez Crisis and the Algerian War. It was dissolved immediately after the Algiers putsch of 1961.

== Composition ==
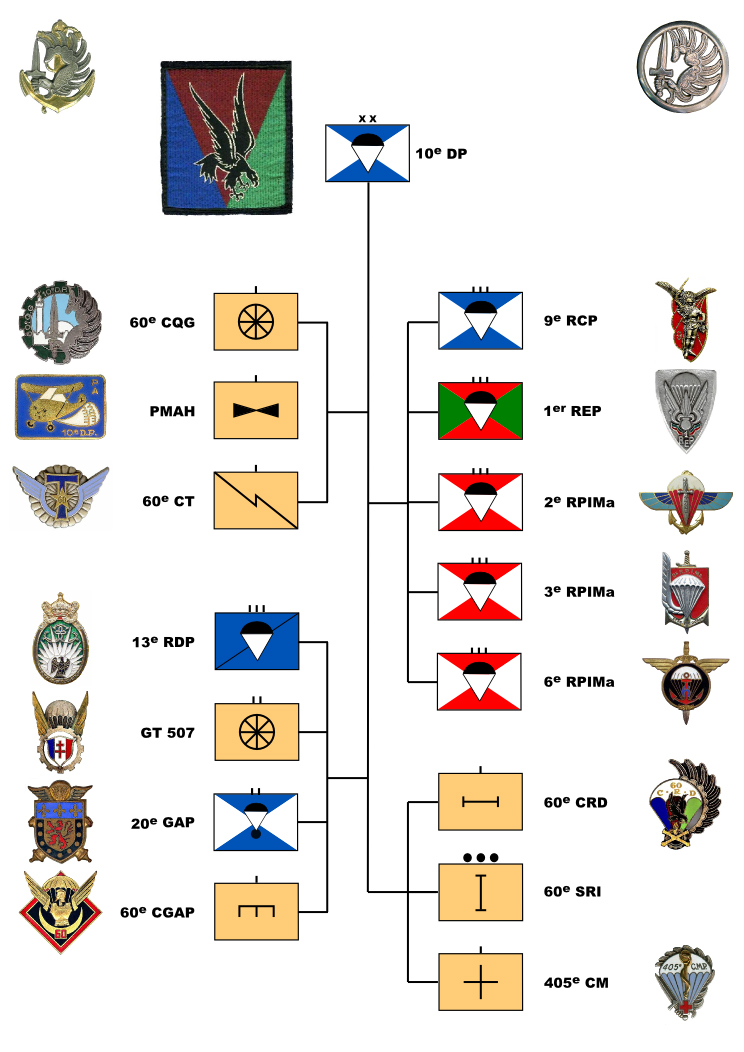
Organizational chart of the 10e D.P.

On July 1, 1956, the 10e D.P. was created with the following units:

- Support:
  - 60th Headquarters company (60^{e} CGQ)
  - 60th Transmission company of (60^{e} CT)
  - Platoon of Army Light Aviation (ALAT)
  - Transport group n°507 (GT 507)
  - 60th Airborne Engineers Company (60^{e} CGAP)
  - 60th Divisional Maintenance company (60^{e} CRD)
  - 405th Medical company (405^{e} CM)
  - 60th Military logistics section (60^{e} SRI)
- Airborne infantry:
  - 1st Foreign Parachute Regiment, French Foreign Legion
  - 1st Parachute Chasseur Regiment (1er RCP), replaced by the 9th Parachute Chasseur Regiment (9e RCP) in April 1960
  - 2e régiment de parachutistes coloniaux (2e RPC)
  - 3e régiment de parachutistes coloniaux (3e RPC)
  - 13th Parachute Dragoon Regiment (from July 1957)
  - 6e régiment de parachutistes coloniaux (6e RPC) (from July 1957)
- 20th Parachute Artillery Group (20e GAP)

On the 1 December 1958, the "Colonial Troops" was renamed "Troupes de marine".

== History ==
=== Operation Musketeer ===
Barely created, the 10e D.P. took part in the Suez Crisis in Egypt, in an operation named "Operation Musketeer". The 10e D.P was reinforced for this purpose with:

- One squadron of the 2nd Foreign Cavalry Regiment (2^{e} R.E.C) comprising 148 men and 17 AMX-13.
- 10 LVT Alligator with 40 men
- A platoon of 6 Delahaye jeeps with SS.10 anti-tank missiles
- The 453rd anti-aircraft artillery group (453e GAAL): 803 men

On 5 November 1956, elements of the 10e D.P. were dropped on Port Fuad and Port Said, completed the next morning by amphibious assaults on both towns. Although the battle was a military success, allied troops had to withdraw due to pressure from the United States.

=== Battle of Algiers ===
In Algiers, the National Liberation Front (FLN) was carrying out a wave of terrorist attacks an urban guerilla which made many casualties, mostly Muslim civilians. In January 1957, Robert Lacoste, Minister Resident in Algeria, reacted by giving full powers to General Massu over the Algiers area. Massu sent the 10^{e} D.P. to search out, arrest and question FLN members. The battle of Algiers proved to be a clear success for the French military, with most prominent FLN leaders killed or arrested and terrorist attacks effectively stopped. However, the use of torture against some FLN members led to an increasing opposition to war in France and internationally.

=== Battle of the Frontiers ===
In 1956, the newly independent Republic of Tunisia was helping the FLN by smuggling weapons and men through its territory. The electrified fence known as the Morice Line was built up to prevent Algerian FLN guerrillas from entering the French colony of Algeria from Tunisia. The 10^{e} D.P. was assigned to the surveillance of a portion of the electrified border, in order to intercept rebel bands that have managed to cross it. The Morice Line had a significant impact of the reduction of guerrillas activities by forces that originated from Tunisia. However, general Massu, the commanding officer of the 10e D.P. was relieved of his command as he criticized President Charles de Gaulle's actions.

=== Algiers Putsch ===
French Prime Minister Michel Debré's government started secret negotiations with the anti-colonialist FLN in order to grant independence to Algeria. French settlers and soldiers were stunned by this decision and a putsch was organized in Algiers. With the exception of the 3e RPIMa, the rest of the 10^{e} D.P. supported the coup. When the putsch failed the 25^{e} D.P. along with the 10^{e} D.P. were dissolved. However, the 1st Foreign Parachute Regiment was the only regiment disbanded.

=== Insignias ===
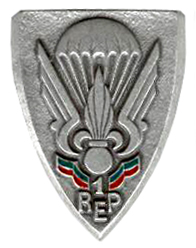
Insignia of the 1st Foreign Parachute Regiment

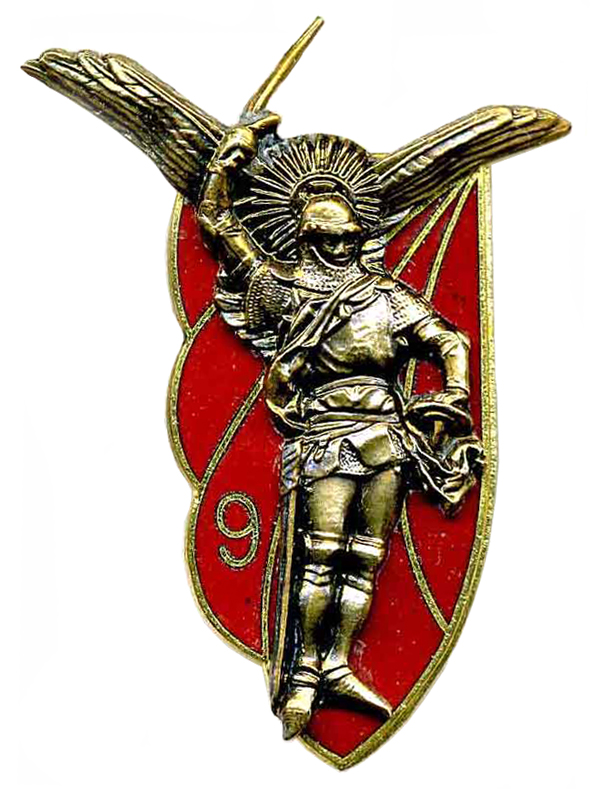
Insignia of the 9th Parachute Chasseur Regiment

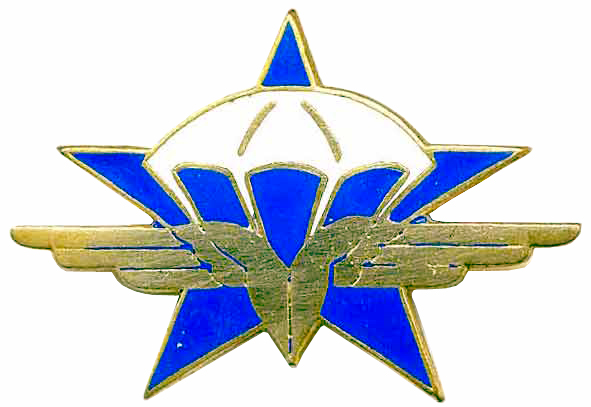
Insignia of 1st Parachute Chasseur Regiment
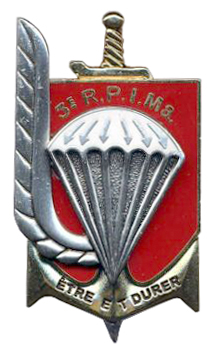
Insignia of 3rd Marine Infantry Parachute Regiment

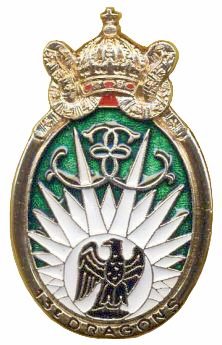
Insignia of 13th Parachute Dragoon Regiment

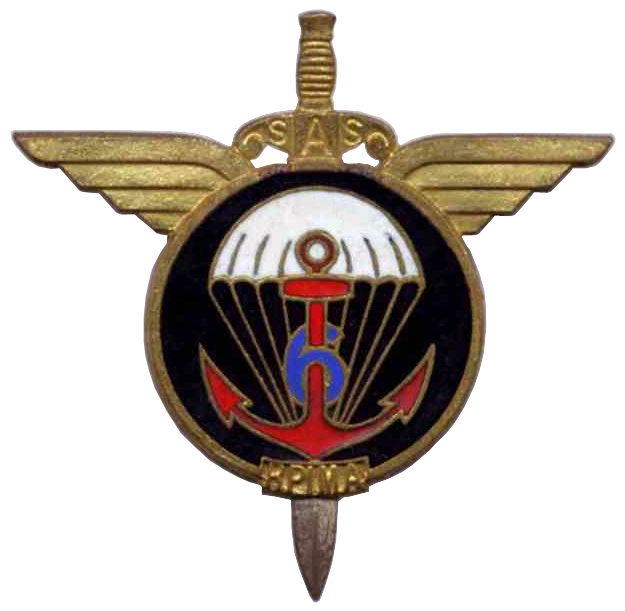
Insignia of 6th Marine Infantry Parachute Regiment

== See also ==
- Airborne Units of France
- 25th Parachute Division
- 11th Parachute Brigade
- Pierre Côme André Segrétain
- Pierre Paul Jeanpierre
- Barthélémy Rémy Raffali
- Paul Arnaud de Foïard
- Hélie de Saint Marc
- Georges Hamacek
