= 25th Parachute Division =

- 25^{e} Division Parachutiste
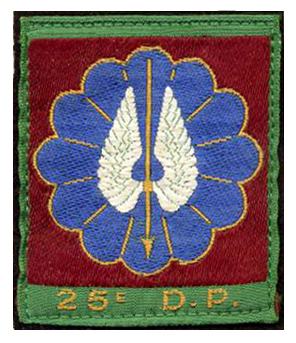
- 25^{e}D.P. Shoulder Arm Insignia featuring Golden White Winged Spear
- Active: 1956–1961
- Country: France
- Branch: French army
- Type: Airborne forces
- Size: Division
- Anniversaries: Saint Michael, September 29
- Engagements: Algerian War

Insignia
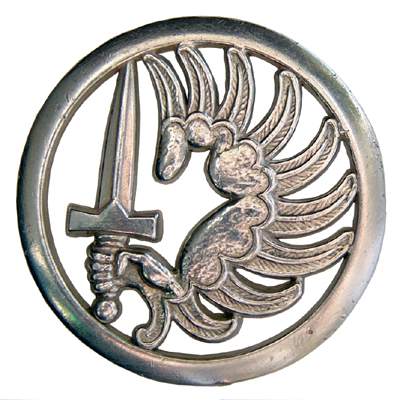
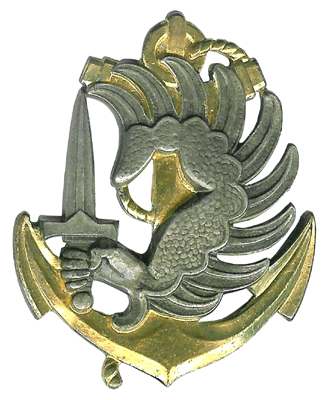
- Identification symbol
- Abbreviation: 25^{e} D.P

The 25th Parachute Division (French: 25^{e} Division Parachutiste, 25^{e} D.P) was an airborne forces division of the French Army, part of the French Airborne Units. Consisting mainly of air assault infantry (helibornes) and airborne forces that specialized in air assault and airborne operations, artillery observer, close-quarters battle, combined arms, counter-battery fire, counterinsurgency in desert warfare, maneuver warfare, military logistics, raiding with small unit tactics, and reconnaissance.

It was established in 1956; the Parachute Division took principal part only in the Algerian War.

== Creation and different designations ==
- 1 June 1956 : Creation of the 25th Parachute Division
- 30 April 1961: the 25th Parachute was dissolved
- In 1961 : following the putsch, the 10th Parachute Division and 25th Parachute Division were dissolved and formed on 1 May 1961 with the 11th Infantry Division (French: 11^{e} Division d'Infanterie), the 11th Light Intervention Division, which would later become the 11th Parachute Brigade.

=== Constitution ===
On 1 June 1956 the 25th Parachute Division was created in the 5th military region from the 25e DIAP and the Colonial Parachute Brigade. The division included five airborne infantry Regiments, two airborne cavalry regiments and one unit of Parachute Artillery:

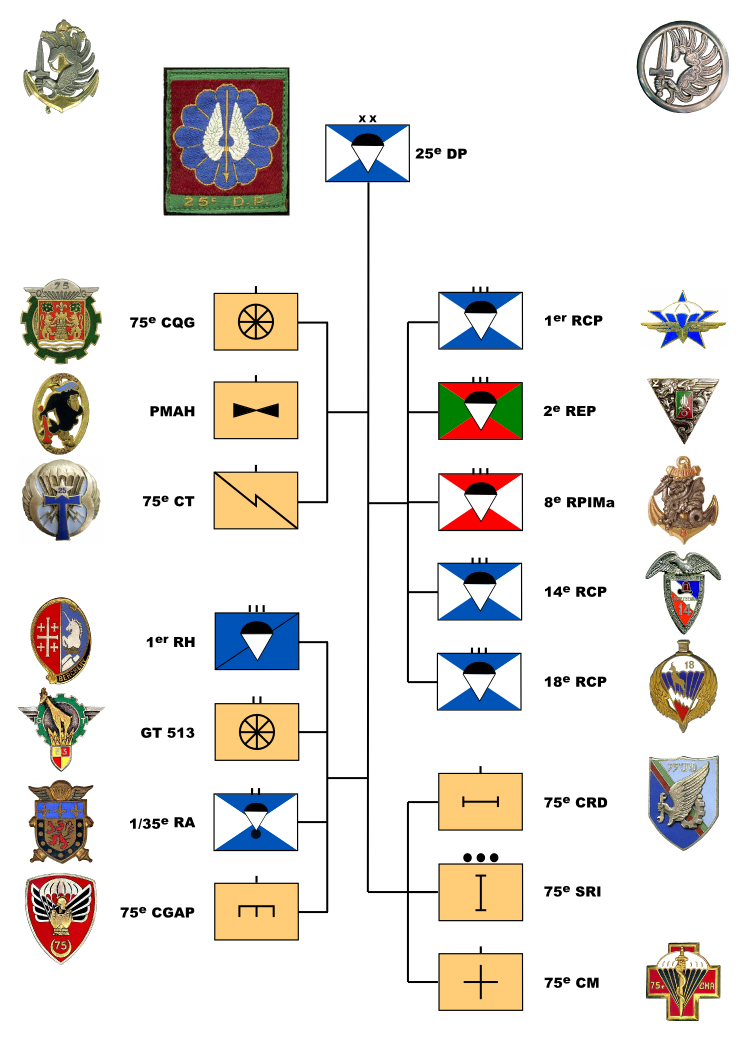
Organizational Chart of the 25th Parachute Division in April 1960

- Command and Support Structure
  - 75th Headquarters Company (75^{e} CGQ)
  - 75th Transmission Company (75^{e} CT)
  - French Army Light Aviation (ALAT) Platoon
  - 513th Transport Group ( GT 513)
  - 75th Parachute Engineer Company (75e CGAP)
  - 75th Repair Division Company (75^{e} CRD)
  - 75th Medical Company (75e CM)
  - 75th SRI
  - General Command Staff of the 1st Brigade
  - General Command Staff of the 2nd Brigade
- Airborne Infantry and artillery
  - 2nd Foreign Parachute Regiment (1956-1961).
  - 1st Parachute Chasseur Regiment (1e RCP)
  - 14th Parachute Chasseur Regiment (14e RCP)
  - 18th Parachute Chasseur Regiment (18e RCP)
  - 8th Colonial Parachute Regiment (8e RPC), created 28 February 1951 in Hanoi as the 8th Colonial Parachute Battalion; recreated on 1 May 1956 as the 8th Colonial Parachute Regiment; renamed on 1 December 1958 the 8th Marine Infantry Parachute Regiment.
- 35th Parachute Artillery Regiment (35e RAP)
- Parachute Cavalry Structure
  - 13th Parachute Dragoon Regiment (13^{e} RDP)
  - 1st Parachute Hussar Regiment (1^{er} RHP)

During tenure, the Division witnessed changes:

- On 1 July 1957 the 13th Parachute Dragoon Regiment was reassigned and attached to the 10th Parachute Division.
- On 1 April 1960 the 9th Parachute Chasseur Regiment relieved the 1st Parachute Chasseur Regiment, part of the 10th Parachute Division.

On 1 December 1958 the Colonial Parachute Regiments underwent a designation change to Marine Infantry Parachute Regiments while retaining their numerical designation.

== Division Commanders ==
- 1956 - 1956 : General Jean Gilles
- 1956 - 1958 : General Henri Sauvagnac
- 1958 - 1960 : General Ducournau
- 1960 - 1961 : General Autrand

== History ==
=== Battle of the Frontiers ===
Two of the five airborne infantry regiments of the division; mainly, the 8th Colonial Parachute Regiment and the 14th Parachute Chasseur Regiment; participated from January to May 1958 in the Battle of Frontiers. Accordingly, General Raoul Salan, superior commander in Algeria, delegated all five airborne infantry regiments to General Paul Vanuxem; commander of the zone est-constantinois (ZEC). The battle took place at both the Morice Line and Challe Line and lasted for about 5 months.

== See also ==
- Airborne units of France
- 10th Parachute Division
- 11th Parachute Brigade
- Pierre Côme André Segrétain
- Pierre Paul Jeanpierre
- Barthélémy Rémy Raffali
- Paul Arnaud de Foïard
- Hélie de Saint Marc
- Georges Hamacek

== Sources and bibliography ==
- Collectif, Histoire des parachutistes français, Société de Production Littéraire, 1975.
- J. Baltzer & E. Micheletti, Insignes et brevets parachutistes de l'armée française, Histoires et collections, 2001, ISBN 2-913-903-118.
