= Raymond Duc =

- Born: 31 October 1917; Aïcirits-Camou-Suhast, France
- Died: 19 September 1950 (aged 32); Co-Thiet, Vietnam
- Military career
- Allegiance: France
- Branch: French Army
- Service years: 1938-1940; 1943-1945; 1947-1950
- Rank: Adjudant
- Nickname: Ramuntcho
- Conflicts: World War II; *Battle of France; *Battle of Normandy; *Liberation of Paris; First Indochina War
- Awards: Knight of the Légion d’honneur Médaille militaire Croix de Guerre 1939–1945; Croix de guerre des TOE

Raymond Duc (31 October 1917 – 19 September 1950), also known by his nickname Ramuntcho Duc, was a French soldier who fought in World War II and the First Indochina War. He fought in a raiding party during the early part of World War II, but was demobilized after the Battle of France. In 1943 he fled France and joined the Free French Forces in North Africa. He joined the Tchad March Regiment of the 2nd Armored Division, taking part in its campaigns in France and Germany, most notably the Liberation of Paris. After the war he left the army, but rejoined after two years and served three years in Indochina as a paratrooper with three different battalions before being killed in action.

== Biography ==
=== Early years and World War II ===
Duc was born on 31 October 1917 in Aïcirits-Camou-Suhast, a small Basque village near the border with Spain. After studying at the Lycée de Bayonne and Collége de Betharam in Lourdes, he was just starting a career as a sports instructor when he was called up for military service in 1938. He was sent to the 107th Infantry Regiment based at Angoulême. He served in a Corps Franc (a small unit that conducted raids on the German Siegfried Line), in the early part of World War II, during which he received two citations. He was demobilized in August 1940 after the French defeat in the Battle of France.

After leaving the military, Duc returned to his Basque home, but in February 1943 he was designated to be sent as forced labour to Germany. He choose to leave France by crossing the border into Spain, where he was interned at Pamplona for three months and at Miranda for five, before he reach Casablanca in November. There he joined the Tchad March Regiment of the 2nd Armored Division of General Leclerc and was sent to the 7th Company, under Captain Fonde of the 2nd Battalion under Major Massu. He was shipped with his battalion to England in April 1944, landing in Normandy on 31 July. He took part in the campaigns of Paris, the Vosges, Alsace and Germany. He particularly distinguished himself during the fighting at Villacoublay (24 August 1944) and Dompaire (12 September 1944). He received six citations during the 1944–45 campaign.

=== Indo-China ===
Duc was demobilized in 1945, but after spending two years as a civilian, he enlisted for Indochina in October 1947. He gained his parachute wings in December the same year and served in the 2nd Colonial Commando Parachute Battalion (2e BCCP) under Major Dupuis, then Major Trinquier. Promoted to Adjudant (Warrant Officer) in July 1948, he joined the 5e BCCP under Major Grall, then Major Romain-Desfossés, and took part in the operations of Commando Group 1 under Captain Picherit, as second-in-command, in central and northern Vietnam. When the 5e BCCP returned to France, he extended his tour by joining an Indochinese parachute company that was later integrated with the 7e BCCP. He was killed in action on 19 September by a shot to the head during Operation Gregoire, the first operation of the 7e BCCP. Duc received four citations during the First Indochina War.

In 1981, the 99th class of Saint-Maixent Military School was named in his honour. A commemorative plaque to his memory was placed on his grave in the Suhast cemetery on 2 March 1982 in the presence of Colonel Bernard Messana, commander of the 1er RPIMa.

== Decorations ==
- Knight of the Légion d’honneur
- Médaille militaire
- Croix de Guerre 1939–1945
- Croix de guerre des théâtres d'opérations extérieures
- Médaille des Évadés de France
- Médaille des FFL
- Silver Star (US)
- Bronze Star (US)
- Distinguished Service Cross

He received 14 citations during his career.

== See also ==
- List of companions of the Liberation
