= Battle of Timimoun =

- Part of Algerian War
Date	November – December 1957
Location	Timimoun, Algeria

Belligerents
(France) French Army	ALN

Commanders and leaders
(France) Marcel Bigeard (France) Colonel Brunet	Commandant Ferhat; Cdt. Ben El Hachemi

Strength
1750 men 11 planes 6-12 helicopters ~100 motorized vehicles	150-200 moujahideen

Casualties and losses
16 killed and 18 injured 4 helicopters crashed	95 dead

The Battle of Timimoun or Operation Timimoun involved several military confrontations in Timimoun between the French Armed Forces and the ALN.

== Prelude ==
The Battle of Timimoun was preceded on October 15 by the desertion of the Touat camel company in Hassi-Sekka. The camel soldiers ("méharistes") of this company executed 8 French soldiers, including three non-commissioned officers, and brought reinforcements of 60 or even 100 men to the ALN, with 225 camels, 75 weapons, 10,000 cartridges, as well as 3 radio sets and various equipment.

After this desertion, ground and air search operations were carried out, without much result.

On November 6 (also mention November 8) in Hassi-Tasselgha a convoy of the French Petroleum Company of Algeria escorted by legionnaires of the 4th Saharan Company of the Legion (4th CSPL) was attacked by deserting camel soldiers, the results were as follows: two engineers, five legionnaires were killed, several engineers, legionnaires and Muslim workers (who were in reality accomplices) were taken prisoner, nine jeeps were set on fire, at the end of the fighting the head of mission and six topographers were killed

Following the attack on Hassi-Tasselgha, the region of the Grand Erg Occidental was declared a forbidden zone and the nomadic populations of the region were moved to Hassi-Sakka where a regroupment camp was erected.

The media shockwave forced General Salan, commander-in-chief of the French army in Algeria, to call on Lieutenant-Colonel Bigeard, commanding the 3rd R.P.C., to locate and eliminate the deserting camel soldiers.

On November 13, Lieutenant Colonel Bigeard arrived in Timimoun and collaborated with General Katz and the 1st R.E.P of Colonel Jeanpierre positioned in the region of El-Goléa, after a week of searching some of the deserting camelbacks were located on November 20 in Hassi-Ghambou, 80km from Timimoun.

At the time when Bigeard was preparing to launch men to attack the mujahideen of the ALN, he had at his disposal 1750 men [including 1570 paratroopers], 11 planes, 6 helicopters [then 12 commanded by the colonel Brunot] and all the necessary vehicles [~a hundred]

The ALN strength for this battle was as follows: 150 and 200 mujahideen (deserters and other ALN elements) divided into two large groups after the attack on Tasselgha, the groups were commanded by Commander Ferhat and Ben El Hachemi.

== The Battle ==
=== Opération Timimoun I - Hassi-Rhambou ===
On November 21, the 3rd company of the 3rd RPC was airlifted near the Hassi-Rhambou well where the ALN mujahideen were located. At 12:30 p.m., the 4th company was airdropped, then a section of the squadron was airlifted. The fighting, which began at 9:30 a.m., raged, and the T6s then appeared and targeted the 65 mujahideen (14 of whom had no weapons). The fighting was fierce and lasted until 6:45 p.m.

According to the academic Dahmane Touati at the end of the fighting the ALN deplores 40 mujahideen killed. The French army deplores 12 killed including Lieutenant Pierre Rhoer, Sergeant-Major René Sentenac, Voltigeur Jackie Schneidenbach of the 4th company and medic Roland Fialon of the 3rd company, and 8 wounded.

But the analysis of seized documents and the interrogation of prisoners confirmed that the ALN mujahideen had split into three, and the French army was then to continue its operations in the region.

=== Opération Timimoun II - Hassi-Ali ===
On December 7, after Bigeard intensified the ground and air searches, a plane spotted a man near the Hassi-Ali well, several units were airlifted to the mujahideen and fighting began. At the end of the day, the ALN deplores 45 killed and 6 prisoners and the paratroopers of the French army deplore 4 killed and 6 wounded as well as the loss of a plane.

After successfully breaking the encirclement of the French army, Commander Ferhat and his men reached the region of Figuig, in Morocco.

Operation Timimoun began on November 21 and continued until December 8, 1955. The 3rd RPC left the Timimoun region on December 22. During the operation, four helicopters crashed into the dunes.

== Battle Outcome ==
The Battle of Timimoun and the events that preceded it (desertion of Hassi-Sakka and ambush of Tasselgha) allowed the FLN to undermine the plans of the OCRS by threatening French oil activity and to demonstrate the strategic and political importance that it had for the Sahara. Operation Timimoun cannot be considered a French victory, given the considerable resources mobilized: 1,750 paratroopers and legionnaires benefiting from the use of planes and helicopters as well as media propaganda against an adversary (the ALN) with infinitely weaker resources (150-200 mujahideen not all armed and 225 camels) and given the poor results obtained in relation to the objectives that were set: the location of deserting camel riders and other ALN elements (they will be located a week after the arrival of Bigeard despite the land and air operations started since mid-October), the elimination of the latter (which was partial, some of the fighters and Commander Ferhat succeeded in breaking the encirclement and establishing contact with the ALN in the region of Figuig) and the creation of a psychological shock (which was a failure, the fighting continued in the region of Timimoun and the attachment of the population already acquired to the FLN remained intact).
