= 2nd Marine Infantry Parachute Regiment =

French military unit

- 2^{e} Régiment de Parachutistes d'Infanterie de Marine
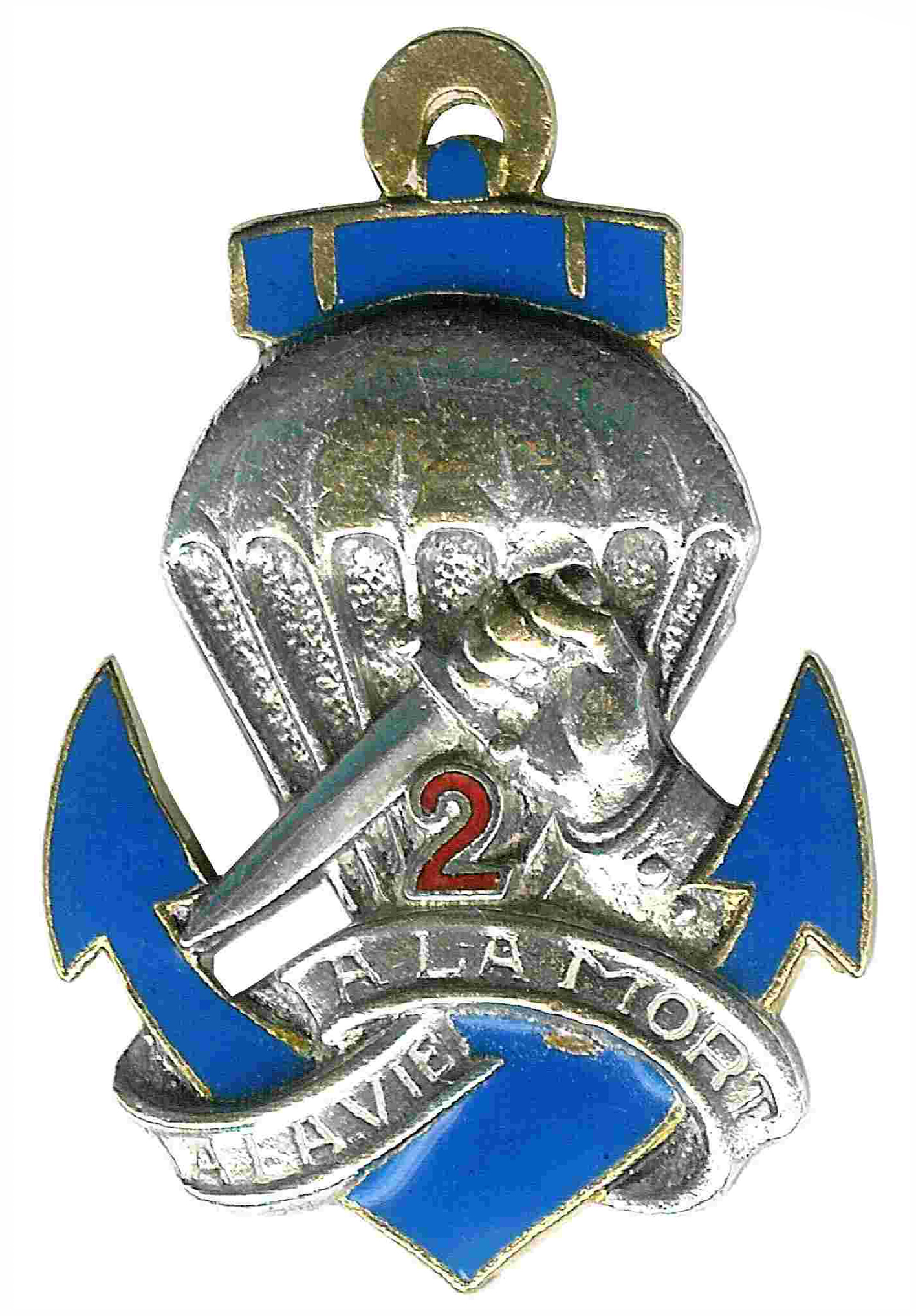
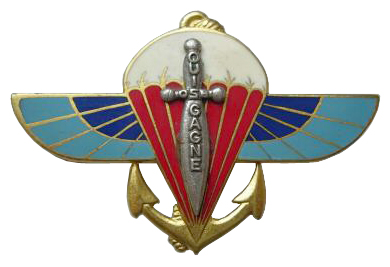
- Regimental Insignia of the 2^{e} BCCP; Regimental Insignia of the 2^{e} RPIMa
- Active: 1947 - present (same unit, different designations) 1947-1953; 1955-1962; 1965-present
- Country: France
- Branch: Marine Troops; French Army
- Type: Airborne regiment
- Role: Air assault Amphibious warfare Raiding; Parachuting
- Garrison/HQ: Saint-Pierre, Réunion
- Motto: "À la vie. À la mort" (until July 5, 1962) Since : Ne pas subir
- Anniversaries: Saint-Michel Day
- Engagements: First Indochina War; Algerian War; Suez Crisis

Commanders
- Current commander: Thierry Chigot
- Notable commanders: Roger Trinquier

Insignia
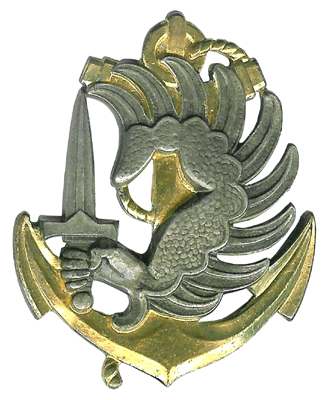
- Insignia of the 2nd Marine Infantry Parachute Regiment
- Abbreviation: 2^{e} RPIMa

The 2nd Marine Infantry Parachute Regiment (French: 2^{e} Régiment de Parachutistes d'Infanterie de Marine, 2^{e} RPIMa) is an airborne regiment of the Troupes de Marine created in 1947. The regiment is heir to the traditions of the 2nd Colonial Commando Parachute Battalion 2^{e}B.C.C.P. As of 2008, the regiment is stationed at Saint-Pierre, Réunion.

== History ==
In 1947, the 2nd Colonial Commando Parachute Battalion 2^{e}B.C.C.P was posted to Indochina, combat engaging until 1953 in two rounds (1947-1949 and 1950-1953), being cited three times at the orders of the armed forces.

In 1954, the 2nd Colonial Parachute Battalion 2^{e} BPC was moved to Morocco and was then subsequently dissolved on July 31, 1955.

In 1955, the regiment was redesignated as the 2nd Colonial Parachute Regiment 2^{e} RPC by regrouping the dissolved components of the 1^{e} BPC, 5^{e} BPC and 8^{e} BPC and then in 1958, designated again as the 2nd Marine Infantry Parachute Regiment. The unit served from 1955 until 1962 in North Africa with the 10th Parachute Division. On 5 November 1956, the unit jumped in the second wave of the French/British attack on the Suez Canal over Port Said and was cited at the orders of the armed forces.

In July 1961, the regiment jumped over Bizerte and broke the Tunisian siege of the French airport installations. The regiment was then dissolved on 5 July 1962 and recreated 1 January 1965 in Ivato, Madagascar from the 5th Marine Infantry Parachute Battalion (5^{e} BPIM).

The regiment was then transferred to Reunion in 1973. Since then, the regiment has participated in various operations: Djibouti (1993/1994), Comoros (1990), Rwanda (1994) and Comors (1995/1996).

In May and October 2009 the regiment performed a parachute jump and participated in a major military exercise in the Bay of Saint-Paul with GAM (Groupe d'assaut par mer).

== Traditions ==
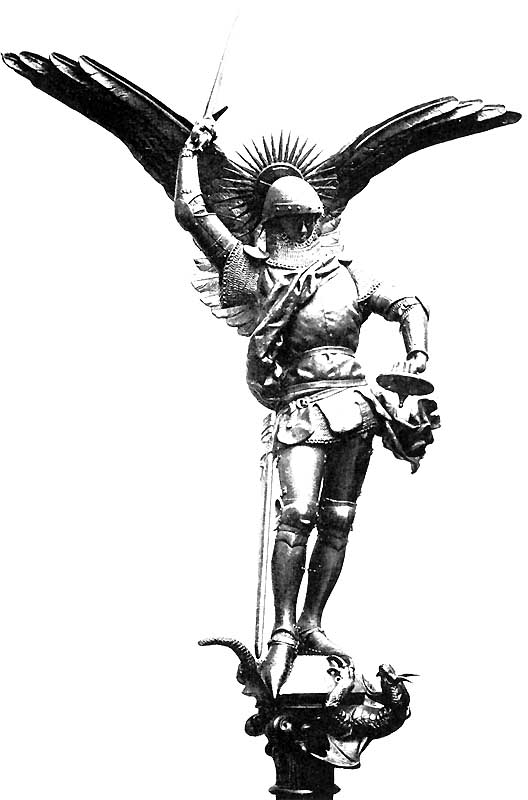
The Archangel Michael featured in Mont Saint-Michel and the Insignia of the 9th Parachute Chasseur Regiment.

Except for the Legionnaires of the 1^{ème} REG, 2^{ème} REG, 2^{ème} REP that retain the Green Beret; the remainder of the French army metropolitan and marine paratroopers forming the 11th Parachute Brigade wear the Red Beret.

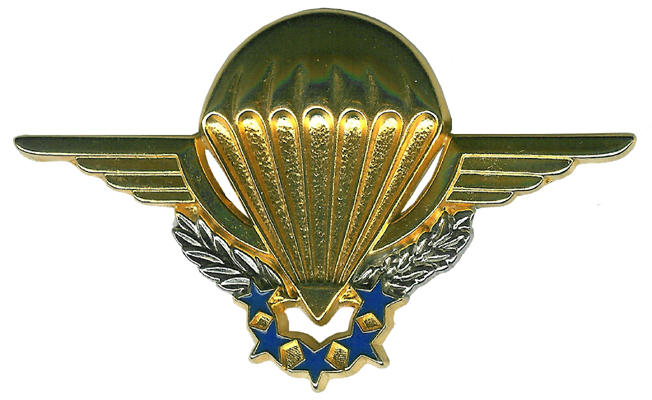
French Commando Parachute Group Brevet of Chuteur Opérationnel

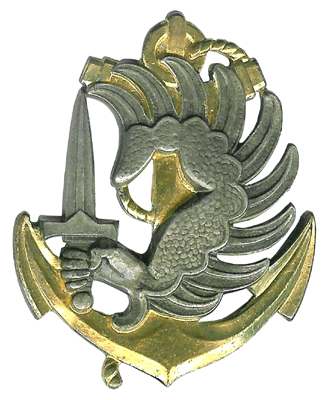
Anchored Winged Armed Dextrochere of French Army Troupes de Marine Paratroopers

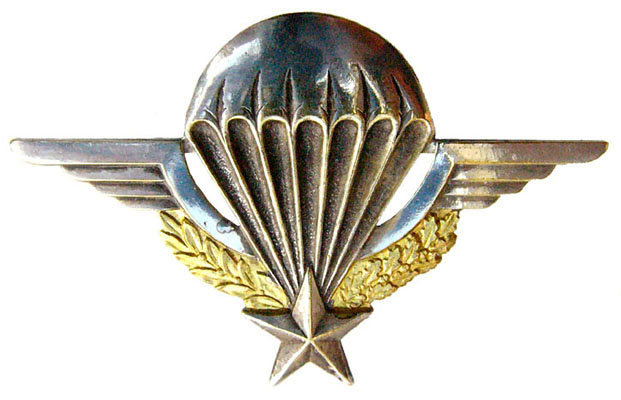
French Parachute Brevet.

The Archangel Saint Michael, patron of the French paratroopers is celebrated on September 29.

The prière du Para (Prayer of the Paratrooper) was written by André Zirnheld in 1938.

=== Insignias ===
Just like the paratrooper Brevet of the French Army; the Insignia of French Paratroopers was created in 1946. The French Army Insignia of metropolitan Paratroopers represents a closed "winged armed dextrochere", meaning a "right winged arm" armed with a sword pointing upwards. The Insignia makes reference to the Patron of Paratroopers. In fact, the Insignia represents "the right Arm of Saint Michael", the Archangel which according to Liturgy is the "Armed Arm of God". This Insignia is the symbol of righteous combat and fidelity to superior missions. The French Army Insignia of Marine Infantry Paratroopers is backgrounded by a Marine Anchor.

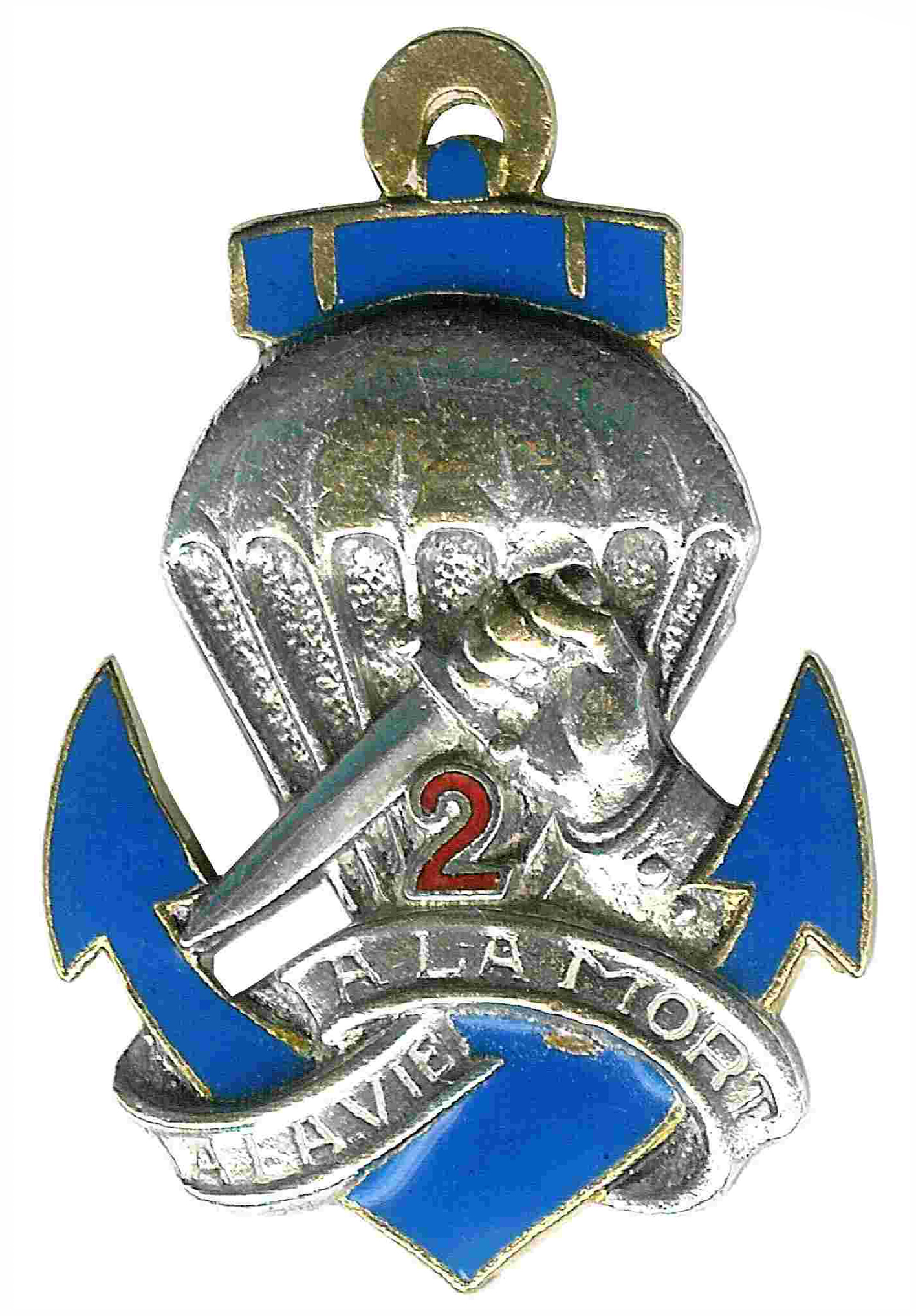
2^{e} B.C.C.P

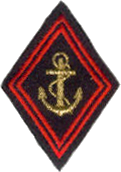
Left arm insignia of the Troupes de Marine

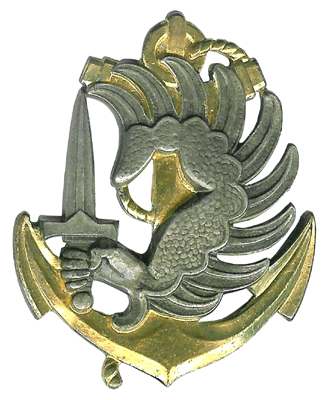
Beret insignia of the Marine Parachute Units

=== Regimental colors ===
Regimental Colors of the 2nd Marine Infantry Parachute Regiment.

Sewn in gold letters in the respective folds, the following inscriptions:

=== Decorations ===
The regimental colors of the 2nd Marine Infantry Parachute Regiment is decorated with:

- Cited 4 times at the orders of the armed forces.

The regiment bears wearing the Fourragère:

- Fourragère bearing the colors of the Croix de guerre des théâtres d'opérations extérieures.
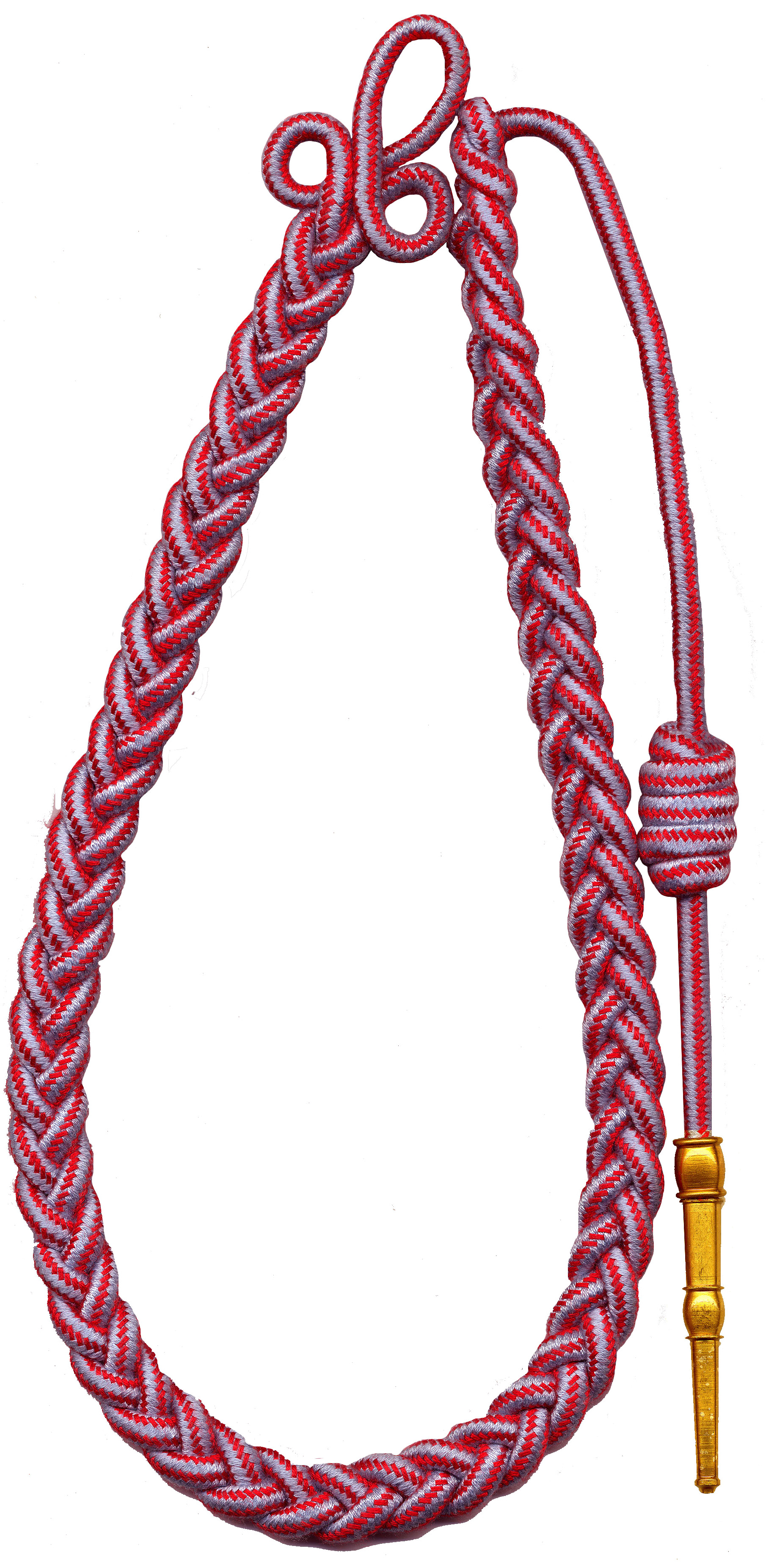
Fourragère aux couleurs de la Croix de guerre des théâtres d'opérations extérieures

=== Honors ===
==== Battle Honors ====
- Indochine 1947-1954
- Port Saïd 1956
- AFN 1952-1962

== Regimental Commanders ==
- Major André Dupuis (1947–1948)
- Captain Roger Trinquier (1948–1949)
- Captain Toce (1950–1952)
- Captain Lenoir (1952–1953)
- Major Ferrano (1955)
- Colonel Pierre Chateau-Jobert (1955–1957)
- Lieutenant Colonel Albert Fossey-François (1957–1958)
- Colonel Olivier Le Mire (1958–1960)
- Colonel Toce (1960–1961)
- Major Mollo (1961–1962)
- Major Yves Gras (1965–1966)
- Lieutenant Colonel Le Borgne (1966–1968)
- Lieutenant Colonel Le Boudec (1968–1970)
- Lieutenant Colonel Foucher (1970–1972)
- Lieutenant Colonel Ralph Firth (1972–1974)
- Lieutenant Colonel Subregis (1974–1976)
- Lieutenant Colonel Salaun (1976–1978)
- Lieutenant Colonel Viard (1978–1980)
- Lieutenant Colonel Sepulchre (1980–1982)
- Colonel Cluset (1982–1984)
- Colonel Fruchard (1984–1986)
- Colonel Meaudre-Desgouttes (1986–1988)
- Colonel Raffenne (1988–1990)
- Colonel Joana (1990–1992)
- Colonel Jean Brantschen (1992–1994)
- Lieutenant Colonel Soum (1994–1996)
- Colonel André Helly (1996–1998)
- Colonel Philippe Beny (1998–2000)
- Colonel Fernand Georges (2000–2002)
- Colonel Franck Reignier (2002–2004)
- Colonel Eric de Vathaire (2004–2006)
- Colonel T. de la Doucette (2006–2008)
- Colonel Chigot (2008–2010)
- Colonel Lafargue (2010-2012).
- Colonel Alexandre (2012-2014).
- Colonel Demont (2014- 2016).
- Lieutenant-colonel Murat (2016-).

== Officers and marines ==
- Raymond Duc
- Elrick Irastorza

=== Sources and bibliography ===
- Collective,"History of French paratroopers, Literary Production Company, 1975".
- Colonel Roger Fleming, Paras "Free France, Editions Presses de la Cité, 1976".
- Henry Corta,"The Red Berets, Association of Former SAS paratrooper, 1952".
