= Marcel Bigeard =

French military officer and politician (1916–2010)

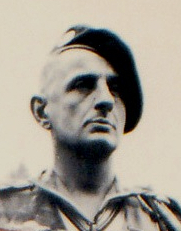
- Marcel Bigeard during his military service
- Born: Marcel Maurice Bigeard; February 14, 1916; Toul, Meurthe-et-Moselle, France
- Died: June 18, 2010 (aged 94); Toul, Meurthe-et-Moselle, France
- Military career
- Branch: French Army Marine Troops
- Service years: 1936–1938; 1939–1976
- Rank: Général de corps d'armée
- Nickname: Bruno
- Units: 23rd Fortress Infantry Regiment (23e RIF); 79th Fortress Infantry Regiment (79e RIF); 23rd Colonial Infantry Regiment (23e RIC); 10th Parachute Division
- Commands: 3rd Thai Battalion; Indochinese Marching Battalion; 6th Colonial Parachute Battalion (1952–1954); Airborne Groupment; 3rd Colonial Parachute Regiment (1955–1958); 6th Colonial Infantry Outremer Regiment (6e RIAOM); 20th Parachute Brigade; 25th Parachute Brigade; Area Forces of the Indian Ocean; 4e RM
- Conflicts: World War II; Battle of France; First Indochina War; Operation Castor; Battle of Dien Bien Phu; Algerian War: Battle of Algiers; Battle of Agounennda; Battle of Timimoun
- Awards: Grand Cross of the Légion d'honneur Croix de Guerre 1939–1945; Croix de guerre des TOE; Cross for Military Valour; Resistance Medal; Escapees' Medal; Colonial Medal; 1939–1945 Commemorative war medal Indochina Campaign commemorative medal North Africa Security and Order Operations Commemorative Medal; Insignia for the Military Wounded; Order of the Dragon of Annam; Order of the Million Elephants and the White Parasol (Laos); Distinguished Service Order (UK); Legion of Merit (US); Order of Merit (Senegal); Order of Merit (Togo); Order of Merit (Comores); Order of Merit (Mauritania); Order of Merit (Centrafrique); Order of Merit (Thailand)
- Other work: Bank clerk, author, deputy

Signature
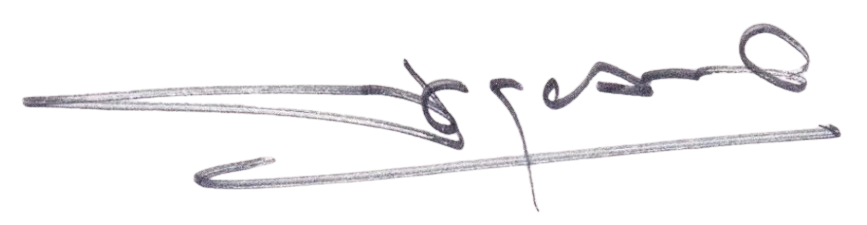

Marcel Maurice Bigeard (French pronunciation: [maʁsɛl biʒaʁ]; February 14, 1916 – June 18, 2010), personal radio call-sign "Bruno", was a French military officer and politician who fought in World War II, the First Indochina War and the Algerian War.

Bigeard was one of the commanders in the Battle of Dien Bien Phu and is thought by many to have been a dominating influence on French "unconventional" warfare thinking from that time onwards. He was one of the most decorated officers in France, and is particularly noteworthy because of his rise from being a regular soldier in 1936 to ultimately concluding his career in 1976 as a lieutenant general and serving as Secretary of State for Defence (1975–1976) under the presidency of Valéry Giscard d'Estaing.

After leaving the military, Bigeard was elected a deputy of Meurthe-et-Moselle from 1978 to 1988 and became a prolific author. His final years were marked by a controversy surrounding allegations that he had overseen torture during the Algerian conflict; he denied the allegations of personal involvement, though defended the use of torture during the war as a necessary evil.

== Early life ==
Marcel Bigeard was born in Toul, Meurthe-et-Moselle on February 14, 1916, the son of Charles Bigeard (1880–1948), a railway worker, and Sophie Bigeard (1880–1964), a domineering housewife. Bigeard's working-class family were staunchly patriotic, and believed France was the greatest nation in the world; Bigeard's often stated belief that France was worth fighting for stemmed from this upbringing.

He also had an older sister, Charlotte Bigeard, four years his senior. Lorraine instilled a strong patriotism in him and his mother a will to win; those two would remain his strongest driving forces. At fourteen, Bigeard quit school to help his parents financially by taking a position in the local Société Générale bank, where he did well.

== Pre-war career ==
Following a 6-year career in Société générale, Marcel Bigeard conducted his military service in France at Haguenau at the corps of the 23rd Fortress Infantry Regiment (French: 23^{e} Régiment d'Infanterie de Forteresse). Incorporated in the regiment as a soldat de deuxième classe in September 1936, caporal-chef, he was relieved of duty and military obligations with the rank of reserve sergent in September 1938.

== World War II ==
Six months following his relief of duty, in anticipation of imminent conflict, he was recalled on March 22, 1939, to duty at the corps of the 23rd Fortress Infantry Regiment and promoted to the rank of sergent.

In September 1939, with the arrival of the reserves, the battalions of the 23rd Fortress Infantry Regiment (23^{e} RIF), served each in a chain link to form new Fortress infantry regiments of "mobilization", Bigeard was assigned to the 79th Fortress Infantry Regiment (79^{e} Régiment d'Infanterie de Forteresse) in the under fortified sector of Hoffen and the Maginot Line. Volunteer for the franc corps, he led a combat group at Trimbach in Alsace and became quickly a sergent-chef then adjudant (warrant officer) at the age of 24.

On June 25, 1940, he was captured (post-armistice) and made prisoner of war, spending 18 months in captivity in a stalag (German POW camp). Following his third attempt to escape on November 11, 1941, he managed to make his way to the unoccupied zone in France, and from there, he went to Senegal.

Volunteering for the French Occidental Africa (French: Afrique-Occidentale française, AOF), he was assigned in February 1942 to a camp in Senegal, in a Senegalese Tirailleurs Regiment of the Armistice Army. Promoted to sous-lieutenant in October 1943, he was directed with his regiment to Morocco.

Recruited as a paratrooper of the Free French Forces, he trained with the British Commandos, near Algiers during three months, then was assigned the preliminary rank of Chef de bataillon (major) at a directorate. In 1944, after paratrooper training by the British, he was parachuted into occupied France as part of a team of four with the mission of leading the resistance in the Ariège département close to the border with Andorra. One of these audacious ambushes against superior German forces gained him a British decoration. His nickname of "Bruno" has its origins in his radio call sign.

At the beginning of 1945, Bigeard created and managed during a scholastic semester, the regional cadres school of Pyla-sur-Mer, near Bordeaux, destined to form officers issued from the French Forces of the Interior. Decorated with the Légion d'honneur and the British Distinguished Service Order for his actions in Ariège, Bigeard was promoted to an active captain in June 1945.

== Indochina ==
Bigeard was first sent to Indochina in October 1945 to assist with French efforts to reassert their influence over the former French colonies. He commanded the 23rd Colonial Infantry and then volunteered to train Thai auxiliaries in their interdiction of Viet Minh incursions around the Laos border along the 'road' R.C. 41 (Route Coloniale).

In the middle of 1945, Captain Bigeard was entrusted with the command of the 6th company of the 23rd Colonial Infantry Regiment (French: 23^{e} Régiment d'Infanterie Coloniale, 23^{e} RIC). Designated to participate to the expeditionary corps in Indochina, the regiment disembarked in Saigon on October 25, 1945, and served until March 1946 in various sectors of operations. During this epoque, the "Bruno" surname started to circulate.

On March 8, 1946, a detachment of the 2nd Armored Brigade 2^{e} DB and 9th Colonial Infantry Division (French: 9^{e} Division d'Infanterie Coloniale, 9^{e} DIC), which the 23rd Colonial Infantry Regiment 23^{e} RIC was part of, disembarked in Tonkin. As a paratrooper, Bigeard was legendary in the French Army for his toughness and physical endurance as the American diplomat Howard Simpson noted that anyone who visited Bigeard could expect only "a thin slice of ham and one small, isolated boiled potato washed down with steaming tea".

On July 1, 1946, Bigeard left the 23^{e} RIC and formed south-east of Dien Bien Phu, a unit constituted of four commandos of 25 volunteers at the corps of the autonomous Thai Battalion. At the return of his men in metropole, mid-October 1946, he assumed command of the 3rd company, constituted of almost 40 men. He then left Indochina on September 17, 1947, and reached France three days later.

Volunteering for another tour in Indochina, Bigeard was assigned on February 1, 1948, to the 3rd Colonial Parachute Commando Battalion 3^{e} BCCP.

On October 1, 1949, Bigeard set on foot the 3rd Tai Battalion, consisting of 2,530 men divided in five regular companies and nine companies of civilian guards with military supplementaries. Relieved from this post, he assumed on April 5, 1950, the command of an Indochinese marching battalion who received, in August, the regimental color of the 1st Tonkin Tirailleurs Regiment (French: 1^{er} Régiment de Tirailleurs Tonkinois) which was decorated by the croix de guerre with palm. On November 12, 1950, Bigeard embarked on a paquebot and left again Indochina.

In the spring of 1951, Bigeard was assigned at Vannes, the colonial demi-brigade of colonel Jean Gilles and was confined with a passing battalion. In September 1951, he was assigned the command of the 6th Colonial Parachute Battalion 6^{e} BPC at Saint-Brieuc. He was ranked then as a Chef de bataillon in January 1952.

On July 28, 1952, Bigeard, at the head of the 6th Colonial Parachute Battalion 6^{e} BPC, disembarked at Haiphong for a third deployment in Indochina. Over half of Bigeard's men were Vietnamese while the other half were French, thus requiring considerable leadership on his part to tie together a mixed unit to allow it to function effectively. On October 16, 1952, the battalion was parachuted on Tu Lê. and confronted during eight days the opposing regimental divisions. During the Battle of Tu Lê, the battalion was encircled by an entire Vietnamese division, being outnumbered ten to one. In the course of extremely fierce fighting, Bigeard fought off the attempts of the Vietnamese to destroy his unit and led his men into a successful break-out into the jungle marching for days and carrying all of their wounded until finally reaching a French fort. The 6^{e} BPC distinguished savoir-faire again during the Battle of Nà Sản, during an operation on Lang Song July 17, 1953, and during Operation Castor on Dien Bien Phu November 20, 1953.

Bigeard was a keen self-publicist, welcoming journalists among his troops, which assisted his cause by getting the materials needed to help him succeed. His units were noted for their dedication to physical fitness above the normal requirements by the army. This unique style included creating the famous 'casquette Bigeard' cap from the 'excess' material of the long shorts in the standard uniform. A fitness fanatic known for his austere lifestyle and working out several hours every day, Bigeard was famous for being one of the fittest men in the entire French Army. He exuded a peculiar sort of French machismo; he always led from the front while refusing to carry a weapon, never asked his men to do anything that he would not do himself, and was well known for his saying: "It is possible, it will be done. And if it is impossible, it will still be done". A colorful man, Bigeard was extremely popular with the troops under his command for his courage and for always leading from the front, but his contempt for superior officers who did not suffer the same hardships as ordinary soldiers, the "generals with middle-aged spread" as Bigeard called them, made for tense relations with his commanding officers. He participated in many operations including a combat drop on Tu Lê in November 1952. It was also in 1952 that he fully qualified to be a flying pilot of a military transport helicopter so as to be fully capable of commanding a paratrooper battalion. An extremely able military tactician, Bigeard was called by the British military historian Martin Windrow the "intuitive master of terrain, who could conduct a battle by map and radio like the conductor of an orchestra".

On November 20, 1953, Bigeard and his unit took part in Operation Castor, the opening stage of the Battle of Dien Bien Phu. Bigeard and the 6^{e} BPC returned to Dien Bien Phu on March 16, 1954, parachuting in to reinforce the now besieged garrison. He acted as deputy to Pierre Langlais, and was a member of the "parachute mafia" – a unit of the high-ranking paratroopers at the camp who oversaw combat operations. Historian Bernard Fall asserts that an armed Bigeard, along with Langlais, took de facto command of the camp from General Christian de Castries in mid-March. The historian Jules Roy, however, makes no mention of this event, and Martin Windrow argues that the 'paratrooper putsch' is unlikely to have happened. Both Langlais and Bigeard were known to be on good relations with their commanding officer.

On December 31, 1953, Bigeard took command of the Airborne Groupment constituted of the 1st Parachute Chasseur Regiment 1^{er} RCP and the 6^{e} BPC, intervening to intercept opposing divisions.

Parachuted on March 16, 1954, while the outcome of Dien Bien Phu was being sealed, Bigeard was promoted to lieutenant-colonel (along with other commanders) during ongoing fighting, making of him a recognized figure while leading his battalion on strongpoints Éliane 1 and 2. Bigeard called Dien Bien Phu a "jungle Verdun", the final and most intense battle in Vietnam as the Vietnamese used their Soviet-built artillery on the hills above to rain heavy fire on the French positions; every day the Vietnamese staged huge "human wave" attacks, sending thousand of infantrymen to try to storm the French lines, only to be repulsed time after time. Bigeard's paras were engaged in the heaviest fighting at Dien Bien Phu, and of his 800 men, only forty had not been killed by the end of the battle.

Bigeard was made a prisoner of war on May 7, 1954, during the fall of the camp. After the battle, the Vietnamese forced the French prisoners on a death march to POW camps, making them march through a hot, humid jungle while refusing to provide food, water or medicine. It was a tribute to Bigeard's intense physical fitness regime that he emerged from Vietnamese captivity in relatively good health. He was liberated four months later, leaving Indochina for good on September 25, 1954. Upon returning to France, Bigeard told the French press he "would do better the next time".

== Algerian War ==
In 1956, Bigeard was sent to the bled (countryside) of Algeria to hunt down the FLN using helicopters to rapidly deploy his men. On June 5, 1956, during a skirmish, Bigeard took a bullet to his chest that narrowly missed his heart. On September 5, 1956, Bigeard was the victim of an assassination attempt by the FLN, being shot in the chest twice by FLN assassins while jogging alone by the Mediterranean. The American pundit Max Boot wrote it was a tribute to Bigeard's toughness and the robust state of his health that he could take three bullets in his chest over the course of four months in 1956 and still be back to duty shortly afterwards.

At the beginning of 1956, the regiment participated at the corps of the elite 10th Parachute Division of General Jacques Massu in the battle of Algiers. The mission of the paratroopers was to re-establish peace in the city in the autumn of 1956 and until the summer of 1957. In late 1956, the FLN had launched the Battle of Algiers, a campaign of assassinations and bombings targeting civilians designed to be the "Algerian Dien Bien Phu". The FLN had decided to deliberately target pied-noir citizens as a way of breaking French power. As one FLN directive put it: "A bomb causing the death of ten people and wounding fifty others is the equivalent on the psychological level to the loss of a French battalion." As such, the FLN set off bombs almost daily at restaurants, cafes, bus stops, football stadiums, and marketplaces, and anybody known to be pro-French was murdered. The FLN favored murdering pro-French Muslims and pied-noirs by making them wear the "Algerian smile" – cutting out the throat, ripping out the tongue and leaving the victim to bleed to death. As the carnage mounted, the 10th Parachute Division was deployed to Algiers as the police simply could not cope.

In March 1957, the 3^{e} RPC made way south of Blida and participated in numerous operations in Atlas and Agounnenda. The regiment relieved the 1st Parachute Chasseur Regiment in July 1957 in Algiers. Bigeard revitalized the unit by weeding out laggards and the uncommitted and then put the remainder through an intense training regime. He led the 3^{e} RPC through numerous operations, the most famous being the 1957 Battle of Algiers. It was known that the FLN was conducting its bombing campaign that was terrorizing Algiers out of the Casbah, the overcrowded medieval quarter of Algiers with narrow, serpentine streets. Bigeard had the 10th Parachute Division build barbed wire fences around the Casbah and imposed a curfew where anyone found on the streets of the Casbah would be shot down and their bodies left out to rot until the morning to show the people of the Casbah that the 10th Parachute Division was a force "even more extreme than the FLN." In January 1957, a map was drawn up of the Casbah, a census was conducted and using files from the Algiers police department the paras started to staged raids to capture suspected fellagha.

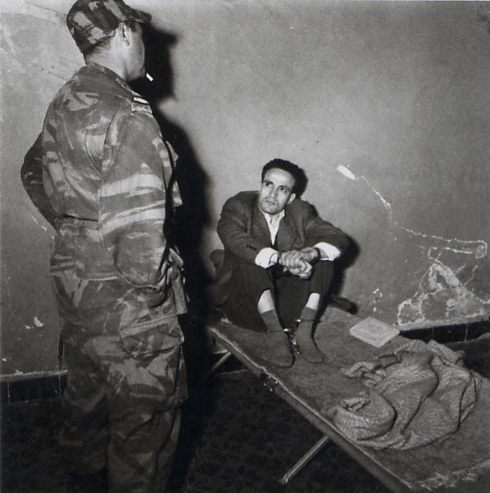
Larbi M'Hidi (seated), whom Bigeard arrested during the Algerian War

=== Capture of M'Hidi ===
Torture was freely used to break suspected FLN members, with a particular favorite tactic being the gégène, where wires from a small generator were attached to the genitals and intense electrical currents were sent through either the penis or the vagina until the suspect started to provide information. Using information gained through such tactics as the gégène, those named by the suspect were then arrested and the whole process repeated. Over the course of the Battle of Algiers, the 10th Parachute Division arrested about 24,000 Muslims of whom about 4,000 "disappeared", as those who were murdered were euphemistically described. During the Battle of Algiers, Bigeard captured Larbi Ben M'hidi, one of the FLN's top leaders, but Bigeard refused to torture him on the grounds that M'hidi was a warrior who deserved respect. During the course of a dinner with his enemy, Bigeard asked M'hidi if he was ashamed that he had bombs planted in baskets at restaurants and cafes designed to kill the patrons, saying "Aren't you ashamed to place bombs in the baskets of your women?", leading to the reply "Give me your planes. I'll give you my baskets."

When Massu ordered M'hidi executed, Bigeard declined the order, and instead Major Paul Aussaresses was sent to take M'hidi away to hang him to "make it look like suicide." As Aussaresses was taking M'hidi out to the countryside to hang him, Bigeard had his troops give the doomed M'hidi full military honors as he was led away.

=== Promotion to colonel ===
After the initial apparent victory in Algiers, in April 1957 Bigeard moved the 3^{e} RPC back into the Atlas Mountains in pursuit of FLN groups in that province. In May he was in the area near Agounennda to ambush a large force of about 300 djounoud of the FLN group Wilaya 4. This group had already attacked an Algerian Battalion on May 21 causing heavy casualties. From a 'cold' start Bigeard estimated the attacking group's probable route of withdrawal and laid a wide ambush along a valley of 100 km². The ensuing battle and followup lasted from May 23 to 26, 1957, but resulted in eight paras killed for 96 enemy dead, twelve prisoners and five captives released. For this exemplary operation he was nicknamed "Seigneur de l'Atlas" ("Lord of the Atlas mountains") by his boss General Massu.

In November 1957, Bigeard and his 3^{e} RPC were despatched to Timimoun in the Sahara to track and destroy a company of méharistes (camel mounted desert troops in French service) who had mutinied and killed their French officers and NCOs before ambushing a convoy of petrol transporters.

Promoted to colonel in January 1958, Bigeard directed the 3^{e} RPC with others to the Battle of the Frontiers from January to June. After other urban, desert and mountain operations, Bigeard was replaced as the commander of 3^{e} RPC in March 1958 by Roger Trinquier. In 1958, Time magazine wrote of Bigard that he was "a martinet, but the idol of his men, who made them shave every day, no matter where they were, and doled out raw onions instead of the traditional wine ration because 'wine reduces stamina'." The senior officers of the French Army, most of whom had graduated from Saint-Cyr, made no secret of their dislike for Bigeard, whom they viewed as a "jumped-up ranker" who disregarded orders if he thought them to be stupid. As a punishment, Bigeard was removed from his front-line duties in Algeria and sent to Paris to train officers in "revolutionary warfare".

Accordingly, Bigeard went back to Paris where the minister of the armies, Jacques Chaban-Delmas, asked him to establish a center of instruction for cadres that opened at the end of April near Philippeville. The École Jeanne d'Arc in Philippeville (modern day Skikda) was to provide field officers with a one-month training course in counter-insurgency techniques. Bigeard created the school and was placed in charge. He did not take any part in the events of May 13, 1958.

After fourth months in Toul, Bigeard went back to Algeria, taking command of a sector in Saida and Oranie on January 25, 1959. Bigeard became adjutant to General Ducournau at the 25^{e} DP Under his disposition were around 5,000 men, formed from the 8th Infantry Regiment, the 14th Algerian Tirailleurs Regiment, the 23rd Moroccan Spahis Regiment 23^{e} RSM, one group of DCA, one artillery regiment, and two mobile groups.

Following a meeting with Charles de Gaulle on August 27, 1959, he assumed command on December 1 of the Ain-Sefra, with an effective strength of 1,500 men. Unlike many fellow officers who were closely associated with the war, he did not take part in the Algiers putsch in 1961.

== Military career after 1960 ==
From July 1960 to January 1963, Bigeard took command of the 6th Colonial Infantry Outremer Regiment 6^{e} RIAOM at Bouar in the Central African Republic.

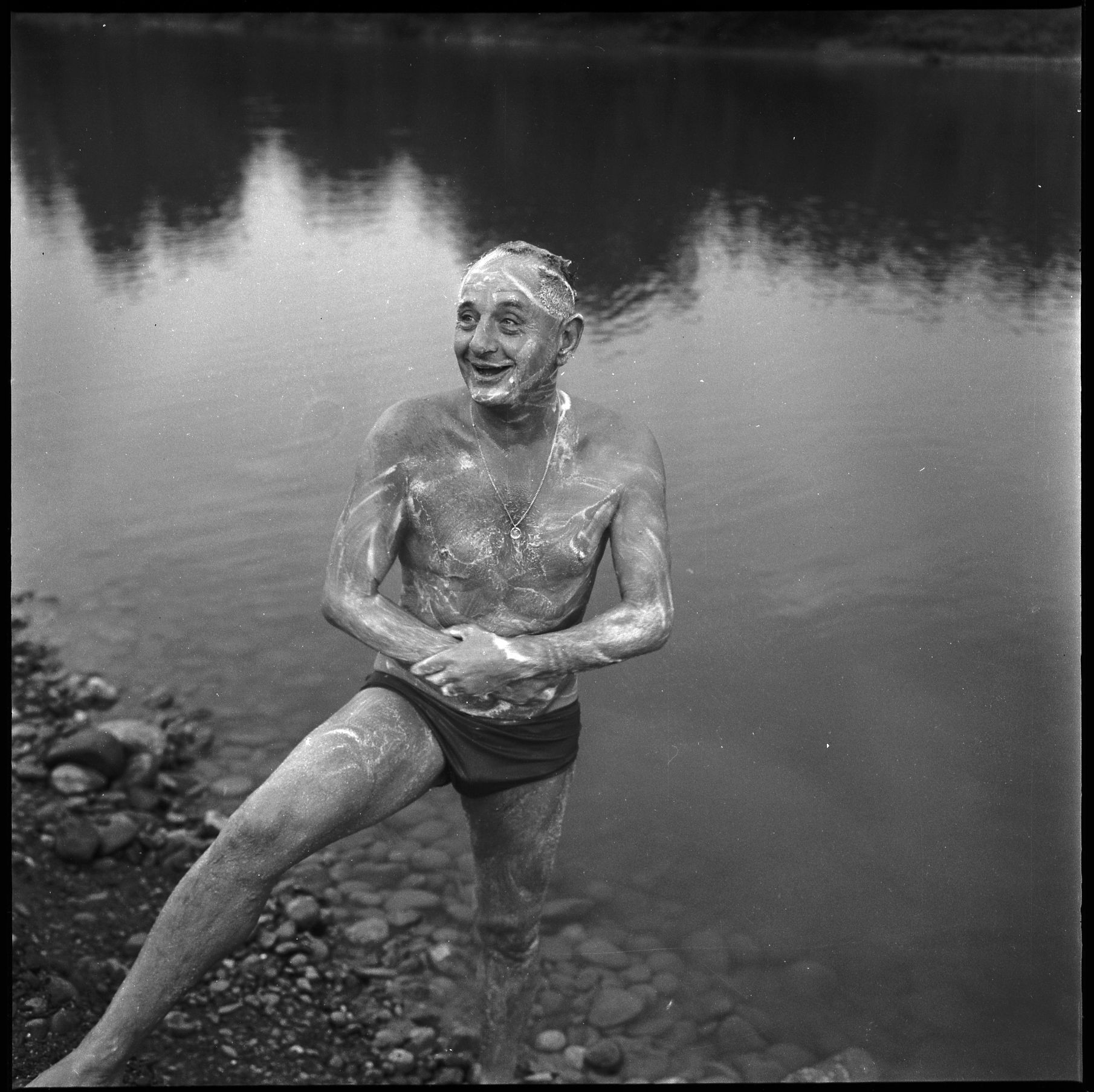
Bigeard in 1966

Following a brief passage by the École supérieure de guerre from June 1963 to June 1964, he took command of the 25th Parachute Brigade (France) which included the 1st Parachute Chasseur Regiment and the 9th Parachute Chasseur Regiment at Pau on August 31, 1964. Following that post, he also held the command of the 20th Parachute Brigade succeeding Général Langlais, which included the 3rd Marine Infantry Parachute Regiment the 6th Marine Infantry Parachute Regiment and the 9th Parachute Chasseur Regiment at Toulouse. Accordingly, he was promoted to the rank of brigadier general on August 1, 1967.

Following an encounter with de Gaulle, he was designated to the post of Commandant superior des forces terrestes in Senegal, which included 2000 men (French Army 1100, French Navy 500, French Air Force 400) and accordingly arrived at Dakar on February 7, 1968.

In July 1970, Bigeard was back in Paris and was assigned for ten months to the army headquarters staff. On August 7, 1971, he became commander of the fr:Forces armées de la zone sud de l'océan Indien at Antananarivo and gained a third star on December 1, 1971. He left Madagascar on July 31, 1973. Bigeard was known for his unusual way of taking command, namely by parachuting in to his post while saluting his men, which nearly led to disaster in Madagascar when the wind blew him into the Indian Ocean that was full of sharks, thus requiring his men to dive in to save him.

=== Promotion to general ===
Following his return to France, he became from September 1973 to February 1974, the second adjoint to the Military governor of Paris. Promoted to général de corps d'armée on March 1, 1974, he assumed command of the 4th Military Region, comprising 40,000 men out of which 10,000 were paratroopers.

He met on January 30, 1975, President Valéry Giscard d'Estaing who proposed the post of secretary of state attached to minister Yvon Bourges. He held that post from February 1975 to August 1976, the date on which he leaves the service.

== Political career ==
Following a brief retirement at Toul, he presented himself to the elections and became a deputy of Meurthe-et-Moselle from 1978 to 1981. During this first legislation, he would also be assigned the function tenure of président de la commission de défense. He was reelected to the first round in June 1981 then to the proportionnelle in March 1986. In 1988, following the dissolution of the assembly, he retired. During his retirement, he spent much of his time writing his memoirs and wrote books on his military career and thoughts on the evolution of France.

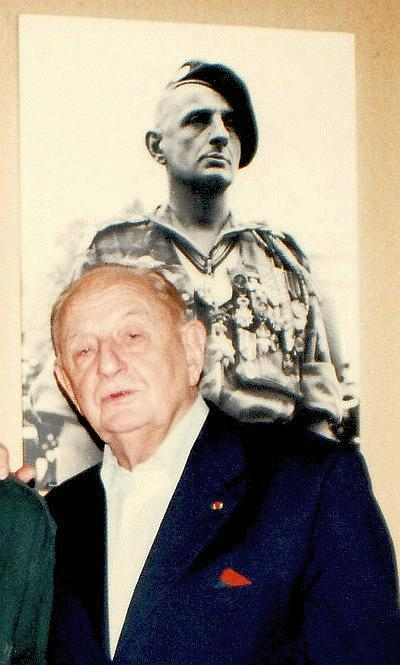
Bigeard at age 80, in his home standing in front of a photo of him some 40 years earlier.

In his last book, Mon dernier round, published in 2009, Bigeard strongly denounced de Gaulle for his treatment of the harkis (Algerian Muslims who served in the French Army), writing that de Gaulle shamefully abandoned thousands of harkis and their families to be slaughtered by the FLN in 1962, and that even those harkis who did escape to France were shunted aside to live in the banlieues, writing that these men and their families who sacrificed so much for France deserved much better.

== Torture accusations ==
In his later life, Bigeard was drawn into the controversy over the use of torture in the Algerian war. The admission by senior military officers such as Massu and Aussaresses that torture was used systematically by the French in Algeria put the spotlight on all figures involved. In a memoir published in 1999, Bigeard admitted to using "muscular interrogations" to make FLN suspects talk, but denied engaging in torture himself while at the same time justifying torture as an interrogation method writing "Was it easy to do nothing when you had seen women and children with their limbs blown off by bombs?". In July 2000 Bigeard justified the use of torture during the Algerian War as a "necessary evil" in Le Monde newspaper, and confirmed its use while denying any claim of his involvement in personally using torture.

Aussaresses stated that the corpses of Algerians executed by French forces and dropped by aircraft into the sea had been dubbed crevettes de Bigeard ("Bigeard's shrimp"). However there is no evidence that Bigeard authorised or participated in such practices, while Aussaresses would later serve as an advisor to the regimes of Augusto Pinochet and Jorge Rafael Videla during Operation Condor where "death flights" were used to dispose of dissidents.

In June 2000 Louisette Ighilahriz, a writer and member of the FLN, alleged that Bigeard and Massu had been present when she was tortured and raped at a military prison from late September to December 1957. Ighilahriz had come forward with her story as she wanted to thank one "Richaud", an Army doctor at the prison for saving her life, saying that Richaud was a most gentle man who always treated her injuries and saved her life. Bigeard rejected Ighilarhiz's claims that she was tortured and raped in his presence, saying that Ighilarhiz's story was a "tissue of lies" designed to "destroy all that is decent in France", and going to say this "Richaud" had never existed. Bigeard was, however, contradicted by Massu, who confirmed the existence of "Richaud", saying that Ighilahriz was referring to Dr. François Richaud, who had been the doctor stationed at the prison in 1957. Bigeard stated that Ighilahriz's claim she had been tortured by him was part of a campaign waged by the same left-wing intellectuals whom Bigeard blamed for undermining the French will to win in Algeria. Bigeard denied having engaged in torture himself, but maintained that the use of torture against the FLN had been a "necessary evil". Canadian historian Barnett Singer claims that Ighilarhiz claims were "full of fabrications", that torture was "never [Bigeard's] modus operandi" and Bigeard was on operations away from Algiers at the relevant time.

== Death ==
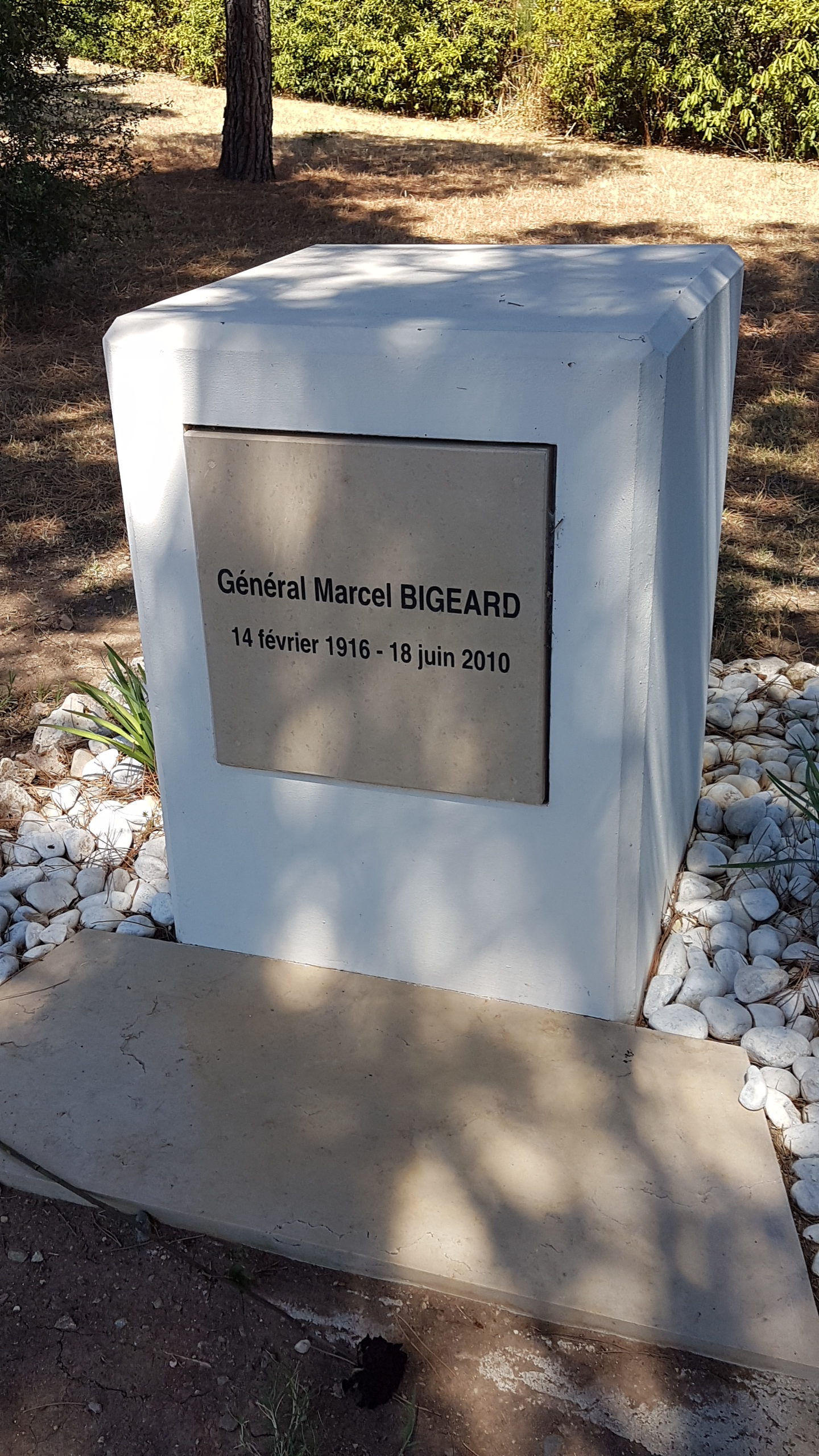
Grave of General Marcel Bigeard at the Mémorial des guerres en Indochine at Fréjus

Bigeard died on June 18, 2010, at his home in Toul.

=== Funeral ===
His funeral procession was held at the Cathédrale Saint-Étienne de Toul on June 21, in presence of former French president Valéry Giscard d'Estaing and Minister of Defense Hervé Morin. Full military honours were accorded to Bigeard on June 22 at Les Invalides by the country's prime minister, François Fillon. In an obituary, the American historian Max Boot wrote that Bigeard's life disproved the popular canard in the English-speaking world that the French are soft and cowardly soldiers, the so-called "cheese-eating surrender monkeys", writing that Bigeard was the "consummate warrior" and one of "the great soldiers of the 20th century".

=== Posthumous controversy ===
Allegations about Bigeard's actions during the Algerian conflict led to significant public controversy surrounding the general's being laid to rest. Bigeard had originally expressed a desire that his ashes should be scattered at Dien Bien Phu. However, the Vietnamese government refused to allow this, as it did not wish to set a precedent. Attempts by the French government to inter him in Les Invalides were "reversed because of public outrage" surrounding allegations of torture, most prominently a petition in the left-wing newspaper Libération that called him an "unscrupulous adventurer" who used "heinous methods". This led to a lengthy controversy over where to bury Bigeard, which was ended in September 2012 when Minister of Defense Jean-Yves Le Drian decided to inter him at the Mémorial des guerres en Indochine in Fréjus. Le Drian's attendance of the burial ceremony in November was criticized by the French Human Rights League, which suggested that praise for Bigeard "would amount to elevating torture to a military discipline worthy of being honoured by the state." However the decision was welcomed by French veterans organizations.

Writing in the French Studies Bulletin, in 2021, Christopher Hogg concluded Bigeard and his fellow officers had used torture on a large scale, but doing so had won France a battle:

"Bigeard gave France a victory in the Battle of Algiers in 1956. But he had to use torture to do it. Even though torture was used on an industrial scale by Bigeard and his fellow colonels, the guilt for what he had done was never quite pinned on him at the time."

== Honors and awards ==
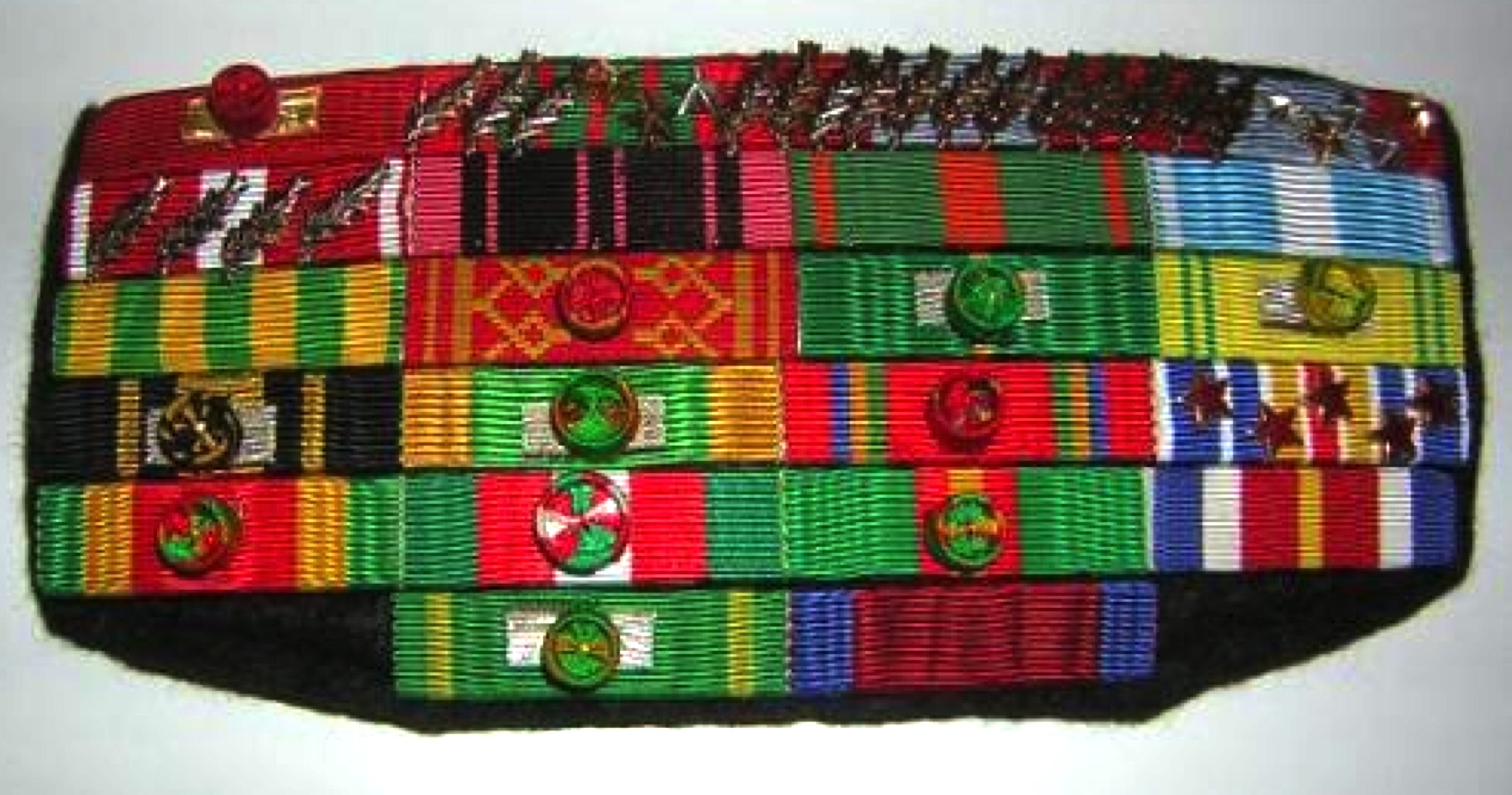
Bigeard's decorations plate

=== Decorations ===
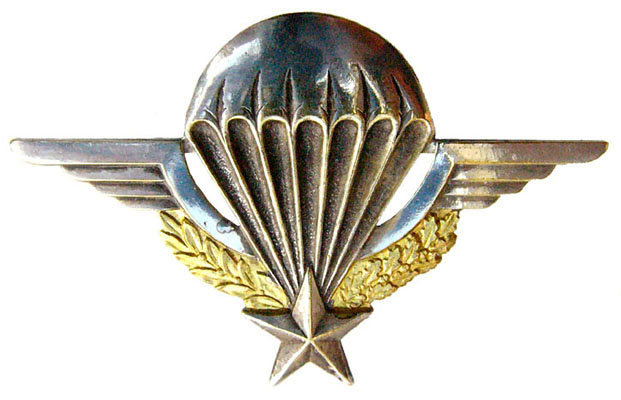

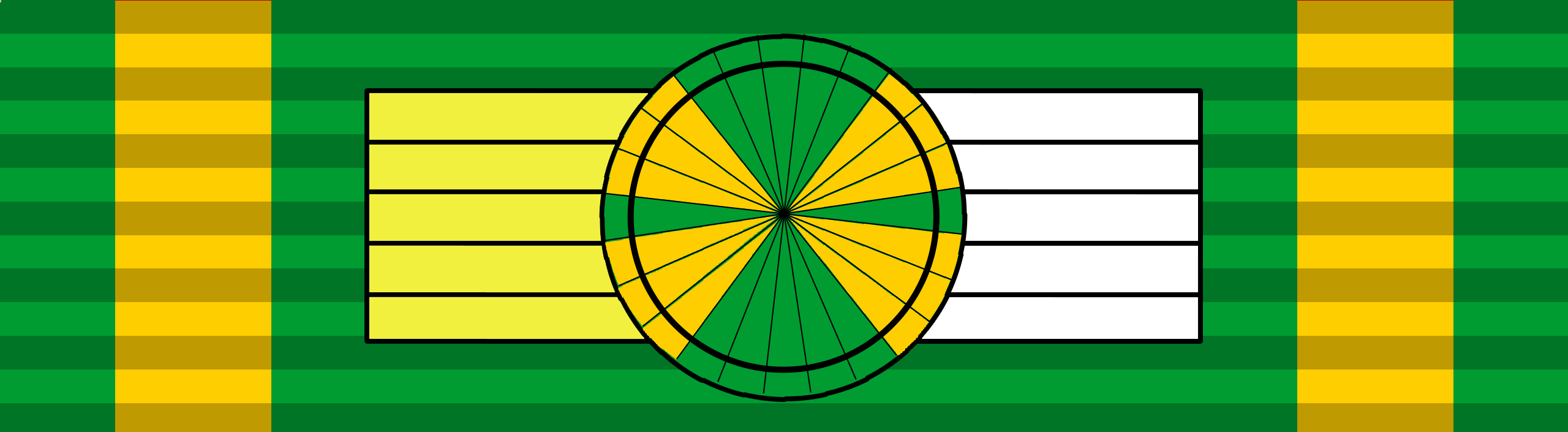

French Honors

- Grand Cross of the Légion d'honneur
- Croix de Guerre 1939–1945 with 6 citations out of which 3 at the orders of the armed forces (3 palms).
- Croix de guerre des Théatres d'Opérations Exterieures with 17 citations out of which 12 at the orders of the armed forces.
- Croix de la Valeur Militaire with 4 citations at the orders of the armed forces.
- Médaille de la Résistance decree of (6/09/1945)
- Escapees' Medal
- Colonial Medal with "Extrême-Orient" (Far East) clasp
- Commemorative Medal of the 1939–1945 War
- Indochina Campaign commemorative medal
- Algeria Commemorative Medal
- Medaille des blessés with 5 stars (5 wounds)
- Honorary Légionnaire de 1ère classe of the Foreign Legion in 1954

Foreign Honors

- Distinguished Service Order (UK)
- Commander of the Legion of Merit (US)
- Grand Officer of the National Order of Merit of Senegal (Grand officier du Mérite Sénégalais)
- Grand Officer of the Order of Merit of Togo (Grand officier du Ordre national du Mérite togolais)
- Grand Officer of the Order of Merit of the Comoros (Grand officier du Mérite Comorien)
- Grand Officer of the Order of King Abdulaziz Al Saud (Grand officier du mérite Saoudite)
- Officer of the Order of the Million Elephants and the White Parasol (Officier de Ordre du Million d'Éléphants et du Parasol blanc du Laos)
- Commander of the National Order of Merit of Mauritania (Commandeur de l'ordre du Mérite national mauritanien)
- Commander of the Order of Central African Merit (Commandeur du Mérite centrafricain)
- Commander of the Order of Civil Merit of the Tai Federation (Commandeur fédération pays Thaï)
- Commander of the Order of the Dragon of Annam (Commandeur du Dragon d'Annam)

General Bigeard was awarded 27 citations, including 19 palms and 8 stars.

== Legacy ==
Bigeard served as an inspiration for Colonel Raspeguy in Lost Command and Jean Mathieu in The Battle of Algiers.

=== Posthumous homages ===
A 3.65 m stele representing Bigeard in profile was inaugurated on June 29, 2012, at the 3 RPIMa base at Quartier Laperrine in Carcassonne.

=== Homages in France ===
In France, several avenues, places and roads bear his name:

- Avenue du Général Bigeard à Toul (Meurthe-et-Moselle)
- Rond-Point du Général Bigeard à Aix-en-Provence (Bouches-du-Rhône)
- Place du Général Marcel Bigeard à Tellancourt (Meurthe-et-Moselle)
- Square Marcel Bigeard à Aix-les-Bains (Savoie)
- Rue du général Marcel Bigeard à Briey (Meurthe-et-Moselle).
- Rue du général Marcel Bigeard à Villeneuve-Loubet (Alpes-Maritimes)
- Rue du Général Bigeard à Trimbach (Bas-Rhin)
- Rue du Général Bigeard à Lexy (Meurthe-et-Moselle)
- Rond-Point du Général Bigeard à Lagord (Charente-Maritime)
- Rond-Point Général Marcel Bigeard à Banyuls-sur-Mer (Pyrénées-Orientales)
- Rue Marcel Bigeard à Scionzier (Haute-Savoie)
- Rond-Point du Général Bigeard à La Rochelle

== Works ==
During his career Bigeard authored or co-authored a number of books which also featured homages to adversaries. In retirement he continued to write, his last work was published in 2010, a few months after he died.

- Le Manuel de l’officier de renseignement (The Intelligence Officer's Handbook)
- Contre guérilla (Counter guerilla), 1957
- Aucune bête au monde..., Pensée Moderne, 1959
- Piste sans fin (English: Tracks without end), Pensée Moderne, 1963
- Pour une parcelle de gloire (English: For a piece of glory), Plon, 1975
- Ma Guerre d'Indochine (English: My Indochina War), Hachette, 1994
- Ma Guerre d'Algérie (English: My Algerian War), Editions du Rocher, 1995
- De la brousse à la jungle, Hachette-Carrère, 1994
- France, réveille-toi! (English: France, awake!), Editions n°1, 1997 ISBN 2-86391-797-8
- Lettres d'Indochine (English: Letters from Indochina), Editions n°1, 1998–1999 (2 Volumes)
- Le siècle des héros (English: The Century of the Heroes), Editions n°1, 2000 ISBN 2-86391-948-2
- Crier ma vérité, Editions du Rocher, 2002
- Paroles d'Indochine (English: Words of Indochina), Editions du Rocher, 2004
- J'ai mal à la France (English: My France is sore), Edition du Polygone, 2006
- Adieu ma France (English: Good-bye my France), Editions du Rocher, 2006 ISBN 2-268-05696-1
- Mon dernier round (English: My last show), Editions du Rocher, 2009 ISBN 2-268-06673-8
- Ma vie pour la France (English: My life for France), Editions du Rocher, 2010 ISBN 2-268-06435-2
- Ma Guerre d'Indochine, documentaire de 52 minutes Réalisation: Jean-Claude Criton – Production L. Salles/Carrère (1994)
- Ma Guerre d'Algérie, documentaire de 52 minutes Réalisation: Jean-Claude Criton – Production L. Salles/Carrère (1994)
- Portrait de Bigeard, documentaire de 52 minutes Réalisation: Jean-Claude Criton – Production L. Salles/Carrère (1994)

== See also ==
- Ferdinand Foch
- Jean de Lattre de Tassigny
- List of French paratrooper units
- Pierre Segretain
- Pierre Jeanpierre
- Rémy Raffalli
- Paul Arnaud de Foïard
- Hélie de Saint Marc
- Bigeard cap – a French Army hat whose invention is attributed to Marcel Bigeard
