= Roger Trinquier =

French Army officer and counter-insurgency theorist (1908–1986)

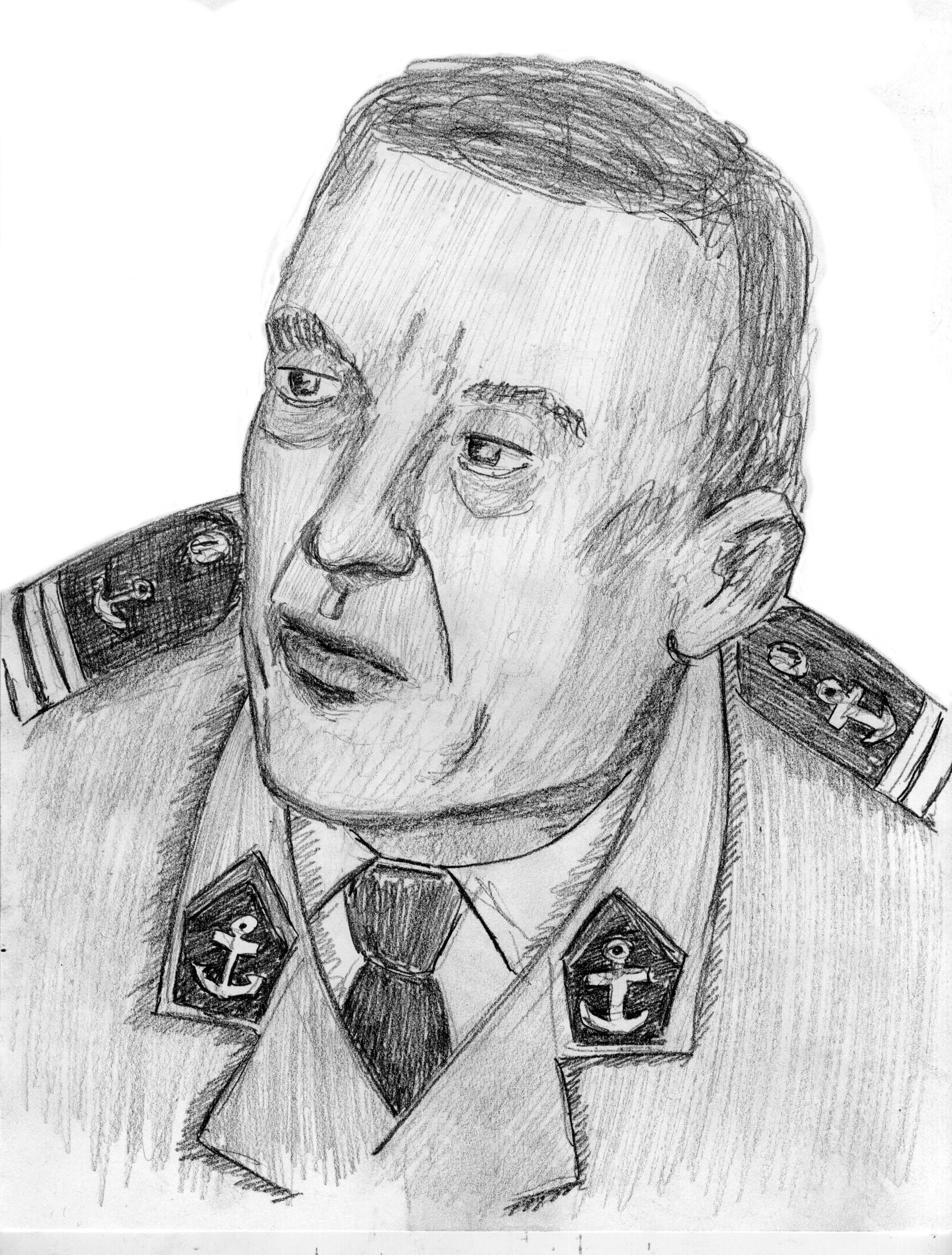
- A sketch of Roger Trinquier
- Born: 20 March 1908; La Beaume, France
- Died: 11 January 1986 (aged 77); Vence, France
- Military career
- Allegiance: France
- Branch: French Army/Marine Troops
- Service years: 1931–1961
- Rank: Colonel
- Commands: 2e BCCP; GCMA; 3e RPIMa
- Conflicts: World War II; First Indochina War; Algerian War; Katanga rebellion
- Awards: Commander of the Légion d'honneur
- Other work: Mercenary, Author

Roger Trinquier (French pronunciation: [ʁɔʒe tʁɛ̃kje]; 20 March 1908 – 11 January 1986) was a French Army officer during World War II, the First Indochina War and the Algerian War, serving mainly in airborne and special forces units. He was also a counter-insurgency theorist, mainly with his book Modern Warfare.

== Early life ==
Roger Trinquier was born on 20 March 1908 in La Beaume, a small village in the Hautes-Alpes department, to a peasant family. He studied at a one-room village school in his home village until 1920, when he entered the Ecole Normale of Aix-en-Provence. He graduated in 1928 at twenty and was called up for 2 years' compulsory military service, being sent to the French Army's reserve officers' school, where unlike most of his classmates he became interested in the military.

When Trinquier's two years of compulsory military service came to an end, he decided to remain in the army and was transferred to the active officers' school of Saint-Maixent, from which he graduated in 1933 as a second lieutenant. He now joined the colonial infantry. After some time with the 4th Senegalese Tirailleur Regiment at Toulon, he embarked on a ship bound for Indochina on 11 May 1934. He was first stationed at Kylua, near Lang Son, in Tonkin (Northern Vietnam). He then took command of a French outpost at Chi Ma on the Chinese border. Trinquier returned to France in 1936 and was assigned to the 41st Colonial Infantry Machine-gun Regiment (41e Régiment de Mitrailleurs d'Infanterie Coloniale, 41e RMIC) at Sarralbe, where he commanded a company until he was sent to China in early August 1938.

He served in the French concessions in China, first in Tianjin, then Beijing and finally Shanghai in January 1940. While stationed there he also learned Chinese. Promoted to captain, he commanded a company of the French military detachment there until 3 January 1946. The detachment's circumstances became increasingly difficult during the Japanese invasion and occupation of large parts of China, as the Japanese confined the French troops to their barracks and confiscated their weapons. When Japan surrendered, the French recovered the weapons that had escaped search and resumed a degree of autonomy, living on credit until the arrival of the "Gaullist" authorities. Trinquier was under the authority of Vichy France in China for five years. Under suspicion as "collaborators" with the Japanese, the battalion's officers had to fill in a detailed questionnaire about their activities during the 40/46 period. He didn't play any role in the Liberation of France, a situation which hindered him in his later career.

== Indochina ==
He arrived at Saigon in early 1946 and was assigned to Commando Ponchardier, a combined army and navy commando unit named after its commander Captain Pierre Ponchardier. Trinquier became commander of B4, one of the sub-units of the commando, recruited from the colonial infantry.

He returned to France in the summer of 1946, charged with the responsibility of recruiting and training volunteers for a colonial parachute battalion that was being formed for combat in Indochina against the Viet Minh. Trinquier returned to Indochina with the 2nd Colonial Commando Parachute Battalion (2e BCCP), during November 1947. The battalion was assigned to Lai Thieu, a refuge for the 301st Viet Minh Regiment, located around 20 km from Saigon. He took part, as second-in-command, in operations in Cambodia and on the Plain of Reeds in southern Vietnam. He took command of the battalion when its commander, Major Dupuis, was killed in action on 9 September 1948, and was promoted to Major on 1 October. Leading the battalion in combat in central Annam and the area around Saigon, he became aware of the inefficiency of the operations launched by the French high command and proposed to General Pierre Boyer de Latour du Moulin, the commander of the French forces in southern Vietnam, a new approach to pacifying areas with strong Viet Minh presence. Trinquier's troops occupied the terrain and laid ambushes against the Viet Minh at night instead of the normal policy of taking a few positions, where refuge could be taken at night and then reopening the roads in the morning. Trinquier's tactics proved effective, reassured people and pacified the Laï Thieu area. On 12 December 1949, after thirty airborne operations and numerous ground operations, Trinquier and the battalion embarked on Pasteur, a French transport ship, and returned to France.

In late December 1951, Trinquier was again in Indochina for his third tour – this time in the newly formed Groupement de Commandos Mixtes Aéroportés (GCMA) (Composite Airborne Commando Group) commanded by Edmond Grall. Trinquier took over the command of the GCMA in early 1953 and directed the fighting behind Viet Minh lines, creating a maquis in the Tonkinese upper region and in Laos, totaling around 30,000 men. Trinquier's maquis contributed to the successful evacuation of the fortified airhead at Na San, in August 1953, and the reoccupation of the Phong Saly and Sam Neua provinces. After the French withdrawal following the defeat of Dien Bien Phu, Trinquier's maquis was left behind and hunted down by Ho Chi Minh's forces.

== Algeria ==
Trinquier returned to France in January 1955, being promoted to lieutenant colonel and assigned to the staff of General Gilles, commander of the airborne troops. He was posted to Algeria in August 1956 at the airborne base of French North Africa as the war against the FLN was becoming more intense. He then served as second-in-command to General Massu, commander of the 10th Parachute Division, during the Battle of Algiers, where he was one of the leading figures behind the creation of the DPU (Dispositif de Protection Urbain).

After a brief stay in France as a director to the airborne school, Trinquier returned to Algeria in March 1958 to take over command of the 3rd Colonial Parachute Regiment, soon to be the 3rd Marine Infantry Parachute Regiment, when its commanding officer, Marcel Bigeard, was recalled to France. He became a member of the committee for public safety formed by Generals Massu and Salan during the May 1958 crisis, which brought Charles de Gaulle back to power; Trinquier resigned from the committee on 11 June and returned to his regiment. He led it during the fighting in southern Algeria and in the Kabylie, where he captured Si Azzedine, a senior FLN leader. Trinquier had been the field superior and mentor of Capt. Paul-Alain Léger, the mastermind and executor of the "Bleuite", an "intoxication" campaign (disinformation spread by subverted FLN agents of lists & rumors about supposed traitors) which triggered widespread internal purges within the FLN.

During the first half of 1959, Trinquier led the regiment during the Challe Offensive, proposed by the French commander in Algeria, Maurice Challe, to cripple the FLN. In March 1959, he handed over the command of the regiment to Louis Bonnigal and in July, took command of the El Milia sector in Constantine department. He was recalled to France in July 1960 and in December assigned to Nice and the staff of the general commanding that group of sub-divisions.

== Later life ==
On 26 January 1961, Trinquier asked for early retirement from the army into the reserve. He was then hired by Moise Tshombe, the leader of the State of Katanga rebellion in Congo, to train his forces. Trinquier only stayed a few weeks in Congo before being thrown out by the United Nations. Returning from Congo, when staying in Athens, he learned of the failed Algiers putsch against de Gaulle, after which he asked to be retired from the reserve as well. In retirement he devoted himself to viniculture and writing about his career and experiences.

With Colonel Buchoud, he was one of the founders of the National Union of Paratroopers (Union Nationale des Parachutistes, UNP), for veterans of the French airborne force. Trinquier was also its first president from 1963 to 1965, before stepping down for General Jean Gracieux.

== Modern Warfare ==
Trinquier is a theorist on the style of warfare he called Modern Warfare, an "interlocking system of actions – political, economic, psychological, military – which aims at the overthrow of the established authority in a country and its replacement by another regime." (Modern Warfare, Ch. 2). He was critical of the traditional army's inability to adapt to this new kind of warfare. These tactics included the use of small and mobile commando teams, torture, the setting-up of self-defense forces recruited in the local population, and their forced relocation in camps, as well as psychological and educational operations.

Perhaps his most original contribution was his study and application of terrorism and torture as it related to this Modern Warfare. He argued that it was immoral to treat terrorists as criminals, and to hold them criminally liable for their acts. In his view terrorists should be treated as soldiers, albeit with the qualification that while they may attack civilian targets and wear no uniform, they also must be tortured for the very specific purpose of betraying their organization. Trinquier's criteria for torture was that the terrorist was to be asked only questions that related to the organization of his movement, that the interrogators must know what to ask, and that once the information is obtained the torture must stop and the terrorist is then treated as any other prisoner of war. (See Chapter 4 of Modern Warfare).

The French Army applied Trinquier's tactics during the Algerian War. In the short run these tactics resulted in a decisive victory in the Battle of Algiers. These tactics were exposed by the press, with little or no effect at the time, as they were generally regarded as a necessary evil. In the longer term the debate on the tactics used, particularly torture, would re-emerge in the French press for decades to come (with the trial of Paul Aussaresses).

== Popular culture ==
The character of Julien Boisfeuras in the novels The Centurions and The Praetorians by Jean Larteguy was according to Larteguy not based on anyone, but believed by many to be at least partially inspired by Trinquier and Paul Aussaresses. The character of Colonel Jean-Marie la Roncière in another of Larteguy's novels, The Hounds of Hell (Les chimères noires), was certainly based on Trinquier and his activities during the Katanga rebellion. Larteguy's fiction is rather critical of Trinquier's theories on subversive war which clearly could not be applied in the Congo. The colonel la Roncière seems rather clumsy and unprepared for the situation he faces in Elisabethville where his total lack of knowledge of the post-colonial situation in Central Africa soon puts him in trouble with his European and African mentors. He is forced to flee the Katangese capital after helping Secessionists win the first round of fighting against UNO troops.

== Bibliography ==
Writings by Trinquier:

- Modern Warfare: A French View of Counterinsurgency (1961)
- Roger Trinquier, La Guerre moderne, Paris: La Table ronde, 1961.
- Roger Trinquier, Le coup d’État du 13 mai. Esprit Nouveau, 1962. Trinquier denounces the foundation of the French Fifth Republic as a coup d'état.
- Roger Trinquier, Jacques Duchemin, and Jacques Le Bailly, Notre guerre au Katanga. Paris: La Pensée Moderne, 1963. Trinquier relates his implication in Katanga.
- Roger Trinquier, L’État Nouveau. Nouvelles Editions Latines, 1964.
- Roger Trinquier, Modern Warfare: A French View of Counterinsurgency, trans. Daniel Lee (New York: Frederick A. Praeger, 1964).
- Roger Trinquier, La Bataille pour l’élection du président de la république. L'Indépendant, 1965
- Roger Trinquier, Guerre, subversion, révolution. Paris: Robert Laffont, 1968.
- Roger Trinquier, Les Maquis d’Indochine. Les missions spéciales du service action. Paris: Albatros, 1976.
- Roger Trinquier, Le premier bataillon des Bérets rouges: Indochine 1947–1949. Paris: Plon, 1984.
- Roger Trinquier, La Guerre. Paris: Albin Michel.

== See also ==
- Groupement de Commandos Mixtes Aéroportés
- David Galula
