= La Beaume =

- Commune
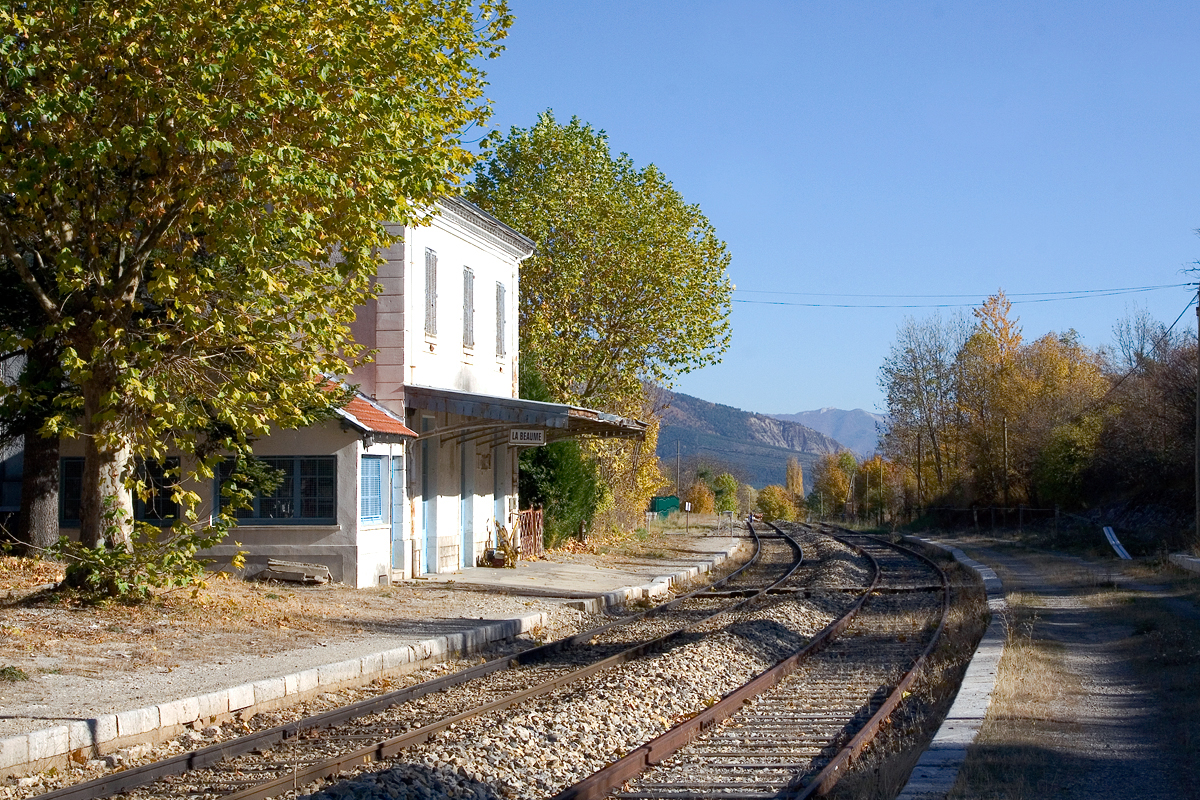
- The La Beaume railway station, on the line between Livron and Aspres-sur-Buëch
- Location of La Beaume
- Location within France Location within Provence-Alpes-Côte d'Azur
- Coordinates: 44°33′11″N 5°38′15″E
- Country: France
- Region: Provence-Alpes-Côte d'Azur
- Department: Hautes-Alpes
- Arrondissement: Gap
- Canton: Serres
- Intercommunality: Buëch-Dévoluy

Government
  - Mayor (2026–32): Jean Rousseau
- Area^{1}: 29.64 km^{2} (11.44 sq mi)
- Elevation: 882 m (2,894 ft)
- Highest elevation: 1,640 m (5,380 ft)
- Lowest elevation: 786 m (2,579 ft)
- Population (2023): 153
  - Density: 5.16/km^{2} (13.4/sq mi)
- Time zone: UTC+01:00 (CET)
  - Summer (DST): UTC+02:00 (CEST)
- INSEE/Postal code: 05019 /05140
- ^{1} French Land Register data, which excludes lakes, ponds, glaciers > 1 km^{2} (0.386 sq mi or 247 acres) and river estuaries.

La Beaume (French pronunciation: [la bom]; Occitan: La Bauma) is a commune in the Hautes-Alpes department in southeastern France.

== Population ==
Historical population
Year	Pop.	±% p.a.
1968	192	—
1975	155	−3.01%
1982	131	−2.37%
1990	145	+1.28%
1999	140	−0.39%
2007	160	+1.68%
2012	159	−0.13%
2017	154	−0.64%
2023	153	−0.11%
Source: INSEE

== See also ==
- Communes of the Hautes-Alpes department
