= 3rd Marine Infantry Parachute Regiment =

- 3^{e} Régiment de Parachutistes d'Infanterie de Marine
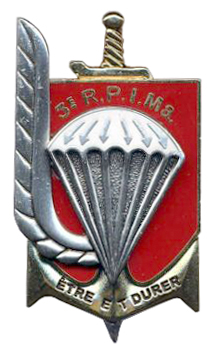
- Regimental insigne
- Active: January 8, 1948–present (same unit, different designations) 3^{e} BCCP 1948; 3^{e} GCCP 1950; 3^{e} BCCP 1951; 3^{e} BCCP 1951; 3^{e} BPC 1952; 3^{e} BCCP 1955; 3^{e} RPC 1955; 3^{e} RPIMa 1958–present
- Country: France
- Branch: Marine Troops; French Army
- Type: Airborne regiment
- Role: Air assault Reconnaissance Parachuting Long-range penetration Close-quarters combat Direct action Urban warfare
- Size: ~1,120
- Part of: 11th Parachute Brigade; 3rd Division
- Garrison/HQ: Carcassonne, France
- Mottos: Être et durer (To Be and endure)
- Colors: Red and blue
- Anniversaries: Saint-Michel Day
- Engagements: First Indochina War; *Battle of Route Coloniale 4; *Operation Lorraine; *Battle of Nà Sản; Algerian War: Battle of Agounennda; Lebanese Civil War: United Nations Interim Force in Lebanon; Multinational Force in Lebanon; Gulf War; War on terror (2001–present): War in Afghanistan (2001–present)

Commanders
- Current commander: Philippe Pottier
- Notable commanders: Marcel Bigeard; Roger Trinquier; Guy Le Borgne

Insignia
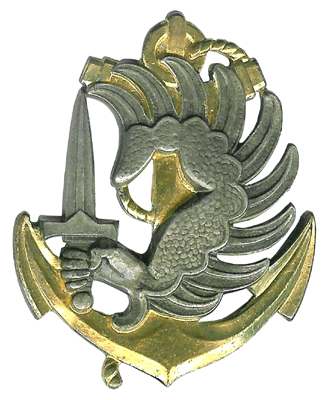
- Insignia of the 3rd Marine Infantry Parachute Regiment
- Abbreviation: 3^{e} RPIMa

The 3rd Marine Infantry Parachute Regiment (French: 3^{e} Régiment de Parachutistes d'Infanterie de Marine, 3^{e} RPIMa) is one of the airborne force regiments of the Troupes de Marine. It is heir to the 3rd Colonial Commando Parachute Battalion created in 1948 and the 3rd Colonial Parachute Regiment . The regiment is part of the 11th Parachute Brigade.

The battalion filled the ranks with the thousands throughout the various campaign battle courses of dissolutions and reformations. The battalions of this regiment are heir to the 1st Colonial Parachute Commando Demi-Brigade, another heir of the paratroopers of Free France, the Demi-Brigade of the SAS, of the Parachute Choc Groupment Battalions, whose regimental colors was decorated with the Légion d'honneur in July 1954.

== Creation and different nominations ==
- On January 8, 1948 : creation of the battalion at Vannes.
- On November 9, 1948 : administrative creation of the 3rd Colonial Parachute Commando Battalion] (3^{e} BCCP).
- On October 1, 1950 : became the 3rd Colonial Parachute Commando Group (3^{e} GCCP).
- November 1, 1950 : dissolution of the 3^{e} GCCP.
- January 1, 1951 : recreation of the battalion at Saint-Brieuc.
- December 27, 1951 : became the 3rd Colonial Parachute Commando Battalion, 3^{e} BCCP.
- May 28, 1952 : became the 3rd Colonial Parachute Battalion (3^{e} BPC).
- June 1, 1955 : recreation of the 3rd Colonial Parachute Battalion at Mont-de-Marsan.
- November 1, 1955 : became the 3rd Colonial Parachute Regiment (3^{e} RPC).
- December 1, 1958 : became the 3rd Marine Infantry Parachute Regiment (3^{e} RPIMa).

== History since 1948 ==
Created in January 1948, the 3rd Colonial Parachute Commando Battalion (3e BCCP) went to Indochina on November of the same year. Cited twice at the orders of the armed forces, the battalion was dissolved in October 1950 after having been destroyed in the Battle of Route Coloniale 4 along the Chinese border. During this episode, 3 BCCP of Captain Cazaux and the 1st Foreign Parachute Battalion of Commandant Pierre Segretain, disappeared.

Recreated on December 27, 1951, the battalion was designated as the 3rd Colonial Parachute Battalion (3e BPC), gaining another citation at the orders of the armed forces.

The battalion was then dissolved again, providing the reformation of another battalion.

Recreated again, the battalion was designated as the 3rd Colonial Parachute Regiment (3e RPC) in November 1955 under the orders of Lieutenant Colonel Marcel Bigeard.

=== 3rd Marine Infantry Parachute Regiment (1958–present) ===
Designated as the 3rd Marine Infantry Parachute Regiment in December 1958, the regiment joined the metropole and stationed in July 1962. The regiment formed a part of the 11th Light Intervention Division.

In 1968, the regiment intervened in Chad during the first civil war.

The regiment took part in various peacekeeping missions in Lebanon with the United Nations Interim Force in Lebanon first then integrated the corps of the Multinational Force in Lebanon. During one of these various peacekeeping interventions, the regimental commander, Colonel Jean Salvan was severely wounded.

The regiment then deployed in Djibouti, again in Chad, Central African Republic, New Caledonia, Togo, Gabon, the Gulf War, Turkey, Zaire, Ex-Yugoslavia, Congo, and Kosovo where the regiment acquired the fifth respective citation.

The regiment has been deployed in combat, combat support, peacekeeping and multipurpose mission operations throughout the world after the September 11, 2001, terrorist attacks.

During an "open day" for the public on Sunday June 29, 2008, at Laperrine Barracks, Carcassonne, a Sergeant fired a rifle using a magazine containing live bullets rather than blanks as intended. The magazine had remained loaded after an earlier exercise. 17 people were hit by bullets including 15 civilians, including at least four children, the youngest aged 3 who was hit in the heart and arm The most senior of six officers who lost their jobs because of the incident was the Chief of Staff of the French Army, General Bruno Cuche, who resigned two days after the incident after intense criticism from the President of the Republic, Nicolas Sarkozy. Another was the Commander of the Regiment.

=== Campaigns ===
3rd Colonial Parachute Commando Battalion (1948–1950)

- 1948 : First Indochina War

3rd Colonial Parachute Regiment (1955–1958)

- 1956–1961 : Algeria

3rd Marine Infantry Parachute Regiment (1958–present)

- 1978 : Lebanon, UNIFIL
- 1983 : Lebanon, Multinational Force in Lebanon
- 1990– 1991: Gulf War
- 1990 : Chad
- 1990 : Gabon
- 1990 : Rwanda
- 1991 : Togo
- 1991 : Zaire
- 1992 : Chad
- 1993 : Zaire
- 1993 : Rwanda
- 1994 : Rwanda
- 1995–1996 : Yugoslavia, UNPROFOR
- 1995 : Chad
- 1995 : Bosnia
- 1996 : Bosnia
- 1996 : Chad
- 1997 : Congo
- 1998 : Congo
- 1999 : Congo
- 1999 : Kosovo
- 2000 : Congo
- 2000 : Kosovo
- 2001 : Bosnia and Herzegovina, SFOR
- 2003 : Afghanistan, ISAF
- 2006 : Ivory Coast
- 2007 : Central African Republic
- 2008 : Afghanistan, ISAF
- 2013 : Mali

== Composition ==
The regiment is composed of 1120 personnel organized into 8 companies:

- Compagnie de commandement et de logistique (CCL) – Command and logistics company
- Compagnie d'administration et de soutien (CAS) – Administration and support company
- Compagnie d'éclairage et d'appui (CEA) – Reconnaissance and support company
- 1^{re} Compagnie de combat – 1st Combat company
- 2^{e} Compagnie de combat – 2nd Combat company
- 3^{e} Compagnie de combat – 3rd Combat company
- 4^{e} Compagnie de combat – 4th Combat company
- Compagnie de réserve (CR) – Reserve company

== Traditions ==
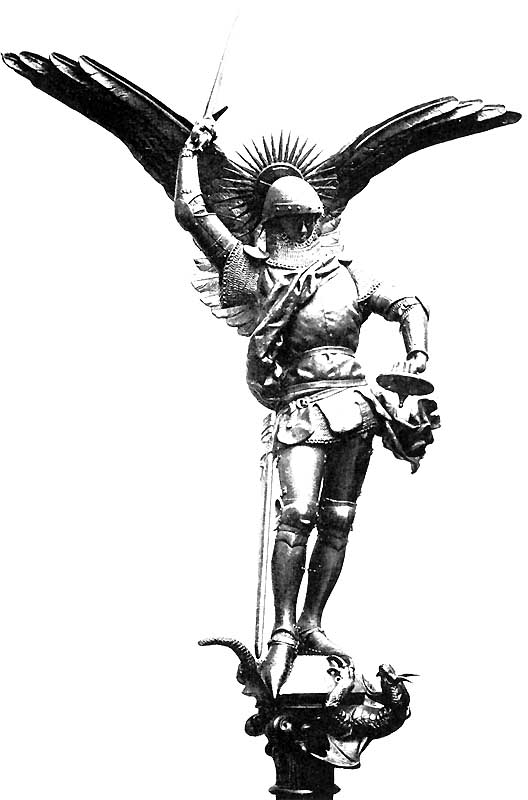
The Archangel Michael featured in Mont Saint-Michel and the insignia of the 9th Parachute Chasseur Regiment

Marine paratroopers forming the 11th Parachute Brigade wear the Red Beret.

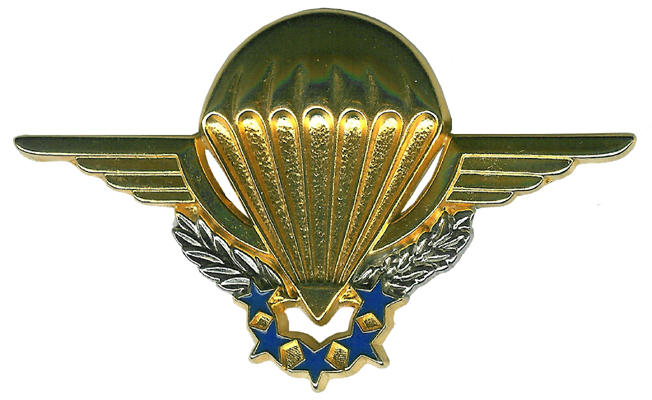
French Commando Parachute Group Brevet of Chuteur Opérationnel

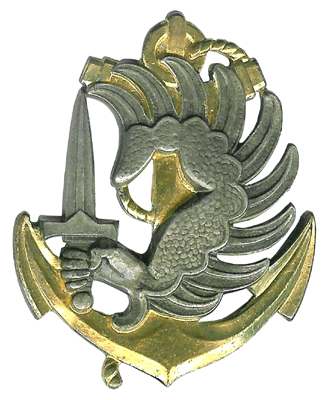
Anchored Winged Armed Dextrochere of French Army Marine Infantry Paratroopers

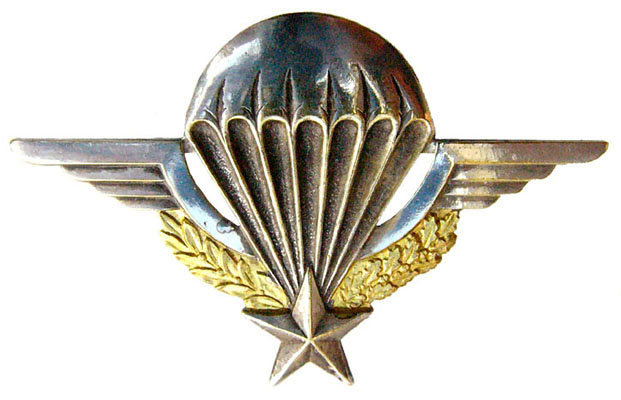
French Parachute Brevet.

The Archangel Saint Michael, patron of the French paratroopers is celebrated on September 29.

The prière du Para (Prayer of the Paratrooper) was written by André Zirnheld in 1938.

=== Insignia ===
Just like the paratrooper Brevet of the French Army, the insignia of French Paratroopers was created in 1946. The French Army insignia of metropolitan Paratroopers represents a closed "winged armed dextrochere", meaning a "right winged arm" armed with a sword pointing upwards. The insignia makes reference to the Patron of Paratroopers. In fact, the insignia represents "the right Arm of Saint Michael", the Archangel which according to Liturgy is the "Armed Arm of God". This insignia is the symbol of righteous combat and fidelity to superior missions. The French Army insignia of Marine Infantry Paratroopers is backgrounded by a Marine Anchor.

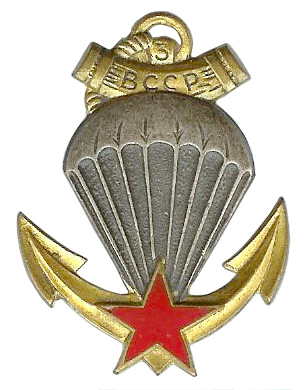
Insignia of the 3^{e} B.C.C.P

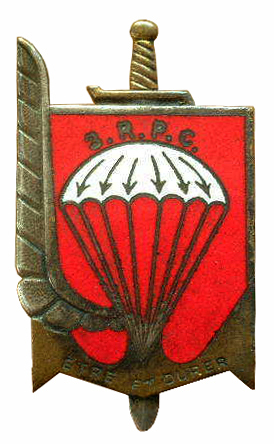
Insignia of the 3^{e} R.P.C

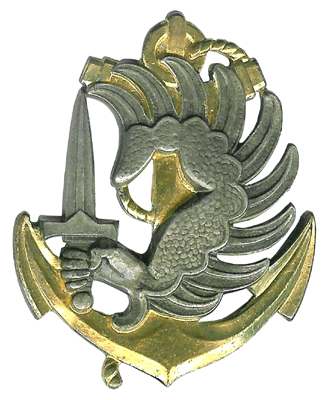
Insignia of the Marine Parachute Units

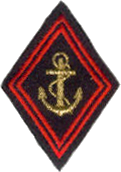
Left arm insignia of the Troupes de Marine

=== Regimental colors ===
Regimental Colors of the 3rd Marine Infantry Parachute Regiment

Since its creation, the regiment has endured the loss of 476 Officers, Sous-Officiers and paratroopers of the 3^{e} RPIMa.

=== Regimental song ===
Hymne du 3^{e} RPIMa
"Rien ne saurait t'émouvoir"

Rien ne saurait t'émouvoir,
Para, rude parachutiste
C'est ta loi dans les dangers de la piste,
Rien ne saurait t'émouvoir.

Tes Anciens ont souffert sur la piste
Comme des chevaliers et des preux
Toi le vaillant parachutiste,
Toujours prêt à faire aussi bien qu'eux.
Car il faudra para, car il faudra para
En découdre par le poignard et par la poudre

Ton chemin sera toujours la piste
Dans la nuit, la chaleur ou le froid
Où sans cri tombe un parachutiste
Piste sans fin toujours devant toi.
Car il faudra para, car il faudra para
En découdre par le poignard et par la poudre

Si tu dois en finir sur la piste,
Que ce soit en beauté comme ceux
Qui sont morts en vrais parachutistes
comme des chevaliers et des preux.
Car il faudra para, car il faudra para

En découdre par le poignard et par la poudre

"Être et durer"

Si tu crois en ton destin,
Si tu crois aux lendemains,
L'ami faut pas hésiter,
Prends ton sac et viens sauter,
Avec nous tu pourras marcher
Tu pourras être et durer.
Refrain

Pour aimer et pour souffrir
Y a pas de moyens de trouver tout ça
Pour toi sans aucun doute
Viens chez les paras.

Si tu retournes au Pays
Si tu vas revoir ta mie
Pour nous tu lui conteras
Nos chants, nos cris, nos combats,
Mais qu'elle t'attende ou qu'elle t'oublie
Pense à ceux qui sont là-bas.

Si tu vas au bout du risque,
Si tu restes sur la piste
La piste sauvage et belle
La piste garce et cruelle,
Mourant, tu sauras l'aimer

Car elle t'aura tout donné.

==== Decorations ====
The regimental colors of the 3rd Marine Infantry Parachute Regiment (3^{e} RPIMa) are as follows:

- Croix de guerre des théâtres d'opérations extérieures is decorated with:
  - 3 palms (3 citations at the orders of the armed forces)
  - one bronze star (citation at the orders of the brigade)
- Croix de la Valeur militaire is decorated with:
  - 2 palms (two citations at the orders of the armed forces)

The regiment has received one citation sans croix at the orders of the armed forces for the peace intervention in Lebanon in 1978, which was replaced with a citation bearing attribution of the Croix de la Valeur militaire with palm.

The citation at the orders of the brigade was awarded for action while leading allied forces in Kosovo in 1999.

On May 21, 2012, the regimental colors were decorated again with the croix de la valeur militaire with palm for service in Afghanistan within the cadre of ISAF.

The regiment bears wearing Fourragère:

- Fourragère bearing the colors of the Croix de guerre des théâtres d'opérations extérieures.
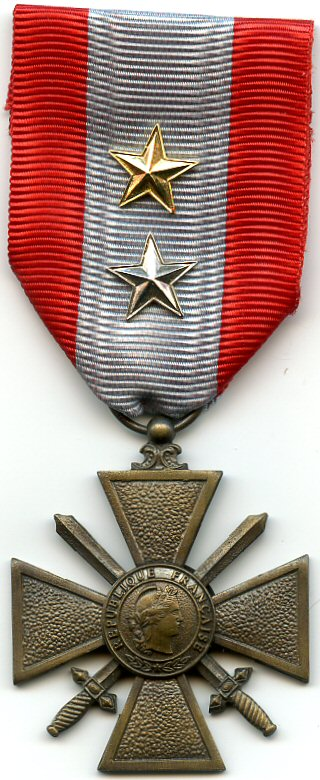
Croix de Guerre TOE

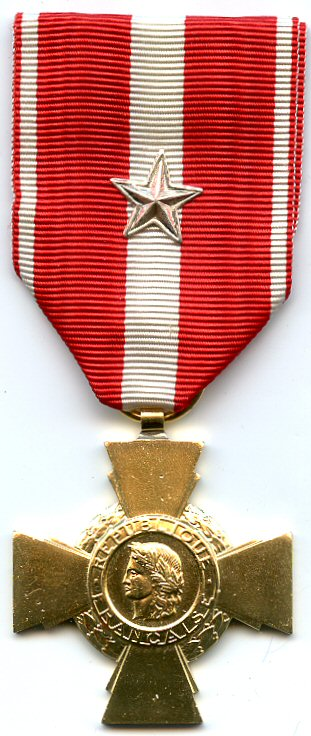
Croix de la Valeur militaire

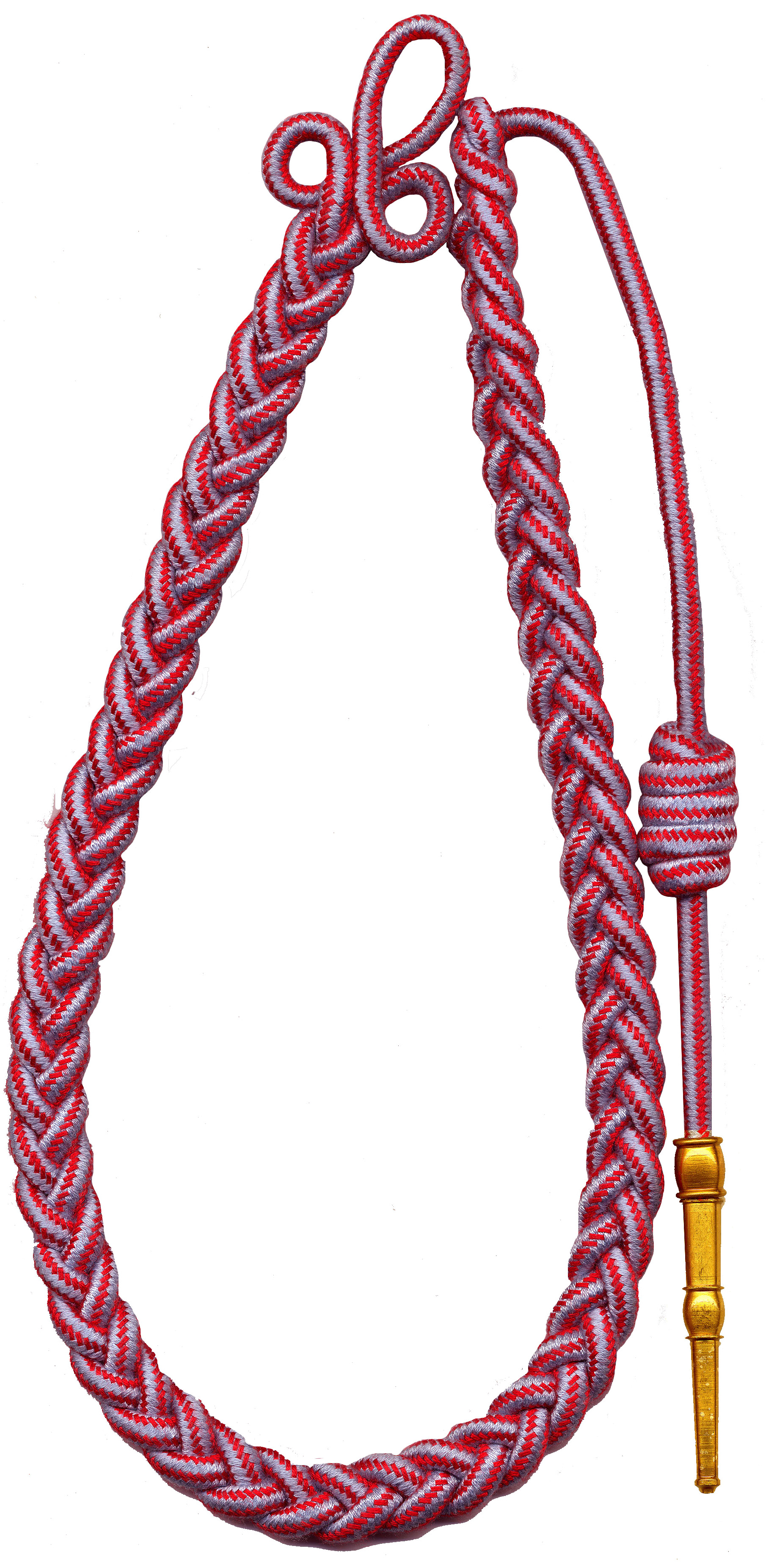
Fourragère aux couleurs de la Croix de guerre des théâtres d'opérations extérieures

=== Honours ===
==== Battle honours ====
- Indochine 1948–1950 1952–1953
- Algerian War (Afrique française du Nord (AFN)) 1952–1962

== Regimental Commanders ==
3rd Colonial Parachute Commando Battalion, 3^{e} BCCP

- Chef de bataillon (major) Henri Ayrolles (1948–1949)
- Captain Paul Cazaux (1949–1950)
- Chef de bataillon Decorse (1950)

3rd Colonial Parachute Battalion, 3^{e} BCP

- Captain Louis Bonnigal (1951–1953)
- Captain Jacques Bouvery (1953)
- Chef de bataillon Albert Lenoir (1955)

3rd Colonial Parachute Regiment, 3^{e} RPC

- Colonel Marcel Bigeard (1955–1958)
- Lieutenant-Colonel Roger Trinquier (April 1958 – December 1958)

3rd Marine Infantry Parachute Regiment, 3^{e} RPIMa

- Lieutenant Colonel Roger Trinquier (1958–1959)
- Lieutenant Colonel Louis Bonnigal (1959–1961)
- Lieutenant Colonel Guy Le Borgne (1961–1962)
- Lieutenant Colonel Marcel Mollo (1962–1963)
- Lieutenant Colonel Maurice Escarra (1963–1965)
- Lieutenant Colonel Robert Courtiade (1965–1967)
- Lieutenant Colonel Pierre de Haynin de Bry (1967–1970)
- Lieutenant Colonel Jean Garnier (1970–1972)
- Lieutenant Colonel Raymond Chabanne (1972–1974)
- Colonel Michel Datin (1974–1976)
- Colonel Jean Salvan (1976–1978)
- Lieutenant Colonel Hugues Mircher (1978–1980)
- Lieutenant Colonel Olivier Leblanc (1980–1982)
- Colonel Daniel Roudeillac (1982–1984)
- Colonel Michel Billot (1984–1986)
- Colonel Serge Ménard (1986–1988)
- Colonel Michel Stouff (1988–1990)
- Colonel Pierre Ribeyron (1990–1992)
- Colonel Henri Poncet (1992–1994)
- Colonel Patrick Marengo (1994–1996)
- Colonel Philippe Six (1996–1998)
- Colonel Didier Legrand (1998–2000)
- Colonel Olivier Tramond (2000–2002)
- Colonel Jean-François Hogard (2002–2004)
- Colonel Bruno Guibert (2004–2006)
- Colonel Frédéric Merveilleux du Vignaux (2006–2008)
- Colonel Jean-Pierre Perrin (2008–2010)
- Colonel Philippe Pottier (2010–2012)
- Colonel Mabin (2012–2014)
- Colonel Journé (2014–2016)
- Colonel Durville (2016–2018)
- Colonel Aunis (2018–2020)
- Colonel Barbarin (2020-2022)
- Colonel Cussac (2022-2024)
- Colonel de Pontcharra (2024-20..)

== Notable members of the 3^{e} RPIMa ==
- Général Marcel Bigeard (1916 -2010), regimental commander 3rd Colonial Parachute Regiment 3^{e} RPC (1955–1958) and the 20th Parachute Brigade which included the 3rd Marine Infantry Parachute Regiment along with other regimental, brigade, area forces and regional commands.
- Général François Cann, regimental commander 8th Marine Infantry Parachute Regiment 8^{e} RPIMa (1977–1979)
- Adjudant-Chef Henri Georges Simon
- Jean Yves Socard

== See also ==
- Jean de Lattre de Tassigny
- Pierre Jeanpierre
- Hélie de Saint Marc
- List of French paratrooper units
