= Operation Sea Guardian =

Maritime security operation

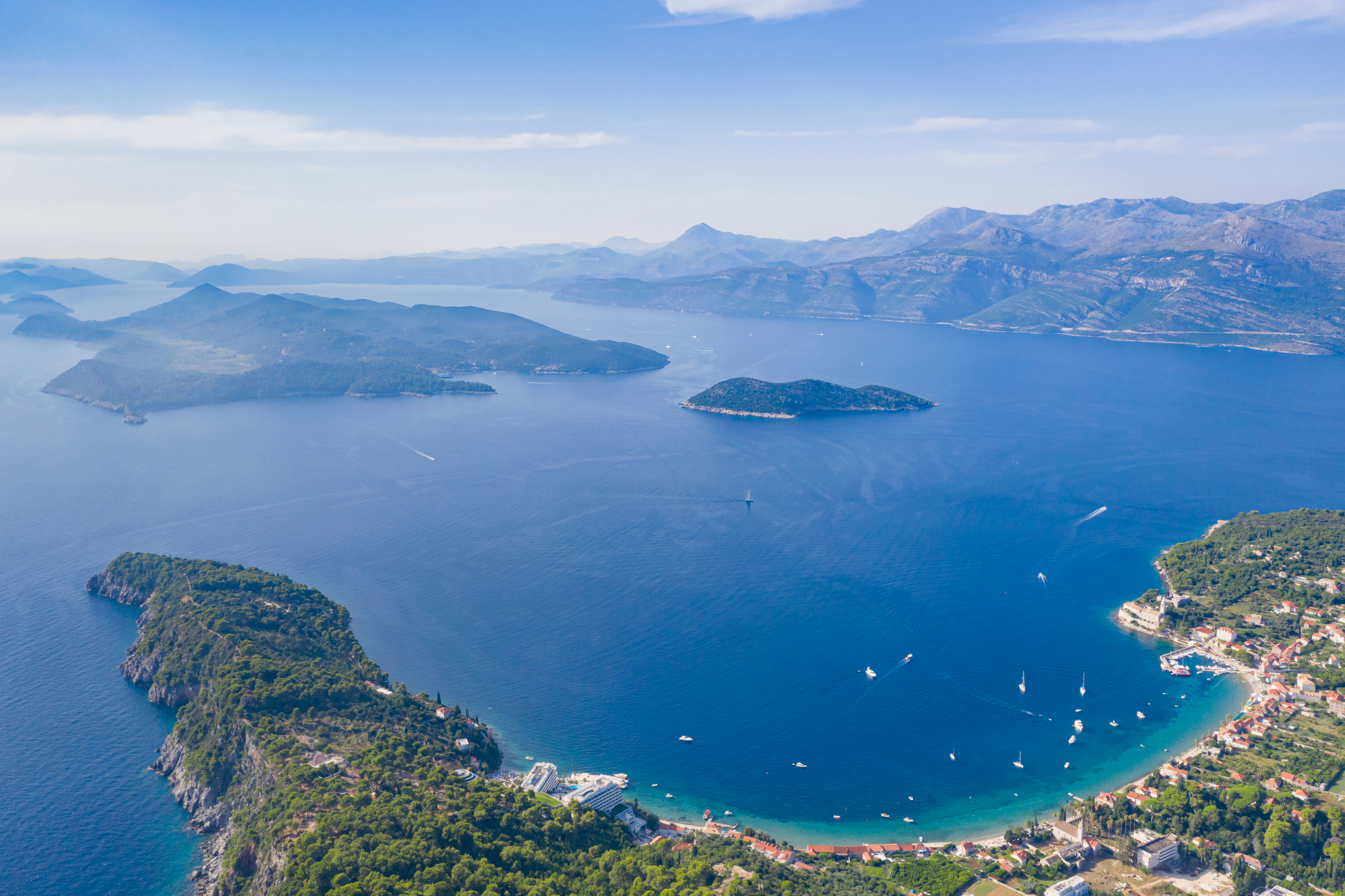
NATO's Operation Sea Guardian was completed in July 2016 on the Mediterranean Sea to combat heightened illicit seafaring activity.

Operation Sea Guardian was launched as a maritime security operation by the North Atlantic Treaty Organization (NATO) during the Warsaw Summit in July 2016, aiming to expand NATO's role within the Mediterranean Sea. The operation was carried out by NATO member states Albania, Belgium, Bulgaria, Croatia, France, Greece, Italy, Portugal, Spain, Turkey, as well as the United Kingdom and United States.

Operation Sea Guardian took over from and transformed the role of Operation Active Endeavour, with its counter-terrorism mission being modified to encompass a considerably broader non-Article 5 maritime security operation.

== Command ==
Operation Sea Guardian is led by the Allied Maritime Command (MARCOM), which is headquartered in Northwood, United Kingdom. MARCOM serves as the hub of maritime security information sharing in this region for NATO, creating a comprehensive picture of day to day maritime activities in the Mediterranean which is sustained by the information provided through Operation Sea Guardian.

The operation is supported by active, standby, or associated provision from Allied nations, as requested by NATO. This can lead to varying numbers of ships, aircraft, personnel, and operation centres as nations partake in different activities. Operation Sea Guardian additionally has access to the assets that compose the NATO Standing Naval Forces – including ships, submarines, and maritime patrol aircraft.

Operation Sea Guardian acts as a standing maritime security operation (MSO), functioning within the framework of the Allied Maritime Strategy (AMS), which is a strategic framework assigned to NATO forces in the name of maritime defence and security operations, promoting NATO's interests and values in the maritime domain. Operation Sea Guardian represents the operationalisation of the fourth task of the AMS, and therefore is designed to ensure maritime protection through the implementation of a full regime of maritime security operations.

== Mission ==
Operation Sea Guardian encompasses many functions that contribute to NATO's role in the maritime security domain in the Mediterranean.

Its three fundamental missions are to:

1. Provide the highest degree of maritime situational awareness
2. Counter terrorism and human trafficking
3. Contribute to regional capacity building

The overarching purpose of the operation is to ensure that the Mediterranean and the Southern European border remains safe and protected. Jens Stoltenberg, Secretary General of NATO, stated that "to protect our territory, we must be willing to project stability beyond our borders. If our neighbours are more stable, we are more secure".

== Tasks ==
To ensure and maintain maritime security in the Mediterranean, Operation Sea Guardian provides crisis response and management alongside logistical support and surveillance for the European Union (EU). Through doing so, it aims to promote dialogue and cooperation between NATO and the EU through the enhancement of collaborate security and exchange of information.

This tactical and operational cooperation between NATO and the EU within the maritime security sphere embodies NATO’s comprehensive approach to maritime security. As stated by the Allied Maritime Command, Operation Sea Guardian is "aimed at working with Mediterranean stakeholders to deter and counter terrorism and mitigate the risk of other threats to security".

Another key function of Operation Sea Guardian is the application of NATO's Counter-Terrorism Policy Guidelines. NATO considers maritime terrorism in the Mediterranean to pose a direct threat to the security of citizens in both NATO and EU countries, as well as to international stability and prosperity. This regime aims to combat terrorism and the proliferation of weapons of mass destruction by conducting checks on vessels suspected of being connected to terrorist organisations or illegally carrying arms, and by promoting a shared awareness of the terrorism threat level.

The responsibilities of Operation Sea Guardian also include the safeguarding of freedom of navigation and protection of critical infrastructure in the maritime environment. The expansion of NATO maritime engagement within the Mediterranean has been seen as imperative to uphold freedom of navigation and protect the blue economy and shipping industry from illegal activities.

Additionally, Operation Sea Guardian aims to prevent loss of life at sea by disrupting human trafficking networks, drug smuggling rings, and deterring terrorism. Combatting these issues allows for the reduction of the subsequent instability, insecurity, and threat of acts of terror that mass migration may pose. This helps achieve NATO's goal to counter terrorism as terrorists can manipulate migration flows, penetrating EU borders.

== Implementation ==
These maritime activities are performed every two months, for a period of three weeks. A constant situational awareness is maintained despite the lack of a permanent presence through the utilisation of the NATO Maritime Command information network. This allows for constant logistical support and exchange of information between the EU and NATO, increasing the deterrence of potential criminals while building trust and confidence between both NATO and the EU.

== History ==
Following the September 11 attacks in 2001, NATO launched Operation Active Endeavour in an attempt to deter and disrupt terrorism activities in the Mediterranean Sea, invoking Article 5 of the Washington Treaty, the collective defence clause. This was the first time that Article 5 was activated, tasking Operation Active Endeavour with the objective of disrupting terrorist activities, dissuading and preventing future attacks.

For almost 15 years, Operation Active Endeavour monitored, gathered information, patrolled, and boarded merchant ships; making use of readily available surface units, submarines, and maritime patrol aircraft and vessels for these counter-terrorism activities. By the end of its mission, Operation Active Endeavour had become an extended aero-naval surveillance mission, securing Mediterranean maritime routes and traffic against terrorism.

At the 2016 Warsaw summit, Operation Active Endeavour was transformed into Operation Sea Guardian, allowing for its mission to perform a much larger and broader range of responsibilities. The knowledge, expertise, and lessons learnt from Operation Active Endeavour, including capabilities and proficiencies in the deterrence of maritime criminal and terrorist activities, were encapsulated into Operation Sea Guardian, before being built upon and expanded through its significantly broader scope.

Following the 2016 Warsaw summit, NATO stated that: "We have transitioned Operation Active Endeavour, our Article 5 maritime operation in the Mediterranean, which has contributed to the fight against terrorism, to a non-Article 5 Maritime Security Operation, Operation Sea Guardian, able to perform the full range of Maritime Security Operation tasks, as needed".

The integration of maritime policing tasks into Operation Sea Guardian's agenda enabled NATO to pre-emptively secure the Mediterranean and the legitimate order of international freedom of maritime circulation, allowing for the prioritisation of preventative and containment actions. This transition from Operation Active Endeavour to Operation Sea Guardian is indicative of a greater focus being placed on terrorism, human trafficking, and organised crime rather than on large scale conflicts.

Operation Sea Guardian became centred around the objective of securing maritime security. It encompassed the role of Operation Active Endeavour in ensuring safety in the Mediterranean whilst moving to strategically focus on permanent surveillance. While in practice this transition can be considered "mainly a change in terminology", it satisfied many diplomatic actors and resolved many political-military tensions, allowing the justification of collective self-defence. The pre-emptive rationale of Operation Active Endeavour allowed for Operation Sea Guardian to extend surveillance to domains such as migration, and enabled the construction of a considerably larger maritime security capacity.

== Cooperation with the European Union ==
Operation Sea Guardian has the overarching role of securing the maritime environment, enabling NATO to offer a maritime presence through enhanced partnerships, dialogue, and cooperation, mitigating gaps in the capacities of individual countries to enforce maritime law. Within the Mediterranean, this coordination has primarily manifested between NATO and the EU. The provision of situational awareness and logistical support to the existing European Union Naval Force (EUNAVFOR) Operation Irini (and previously EUNAVFOR Operation Sophia) is a primary task of Operation Sea Guardian, embodying NATO’s comprehensive approach to maritime security.

=== Joint Declaration ===
In July 2016, the Joint Declaration between the European Council and the European Commission was signed, allowing for Operation Sea Guardian to cooperate with the European Union Naval Force (UNAVFOR), recognising that this would further facilitate and enhance the European Union's Operation Sophia (and later Operation Irini) with the provision of information, surveillance, and logistical support.

The Joint Declaration allowed the EU and NATO (and their twenty-two common member states) to systematically engage in closer strategic and operational cooperation. This renewed effort to address safeguarding as a long-term interest of both institutions led to a mutual reliance on each other with further collaboration including mutual invitations to summits and cooperation on numerous projects across a broad range of policy areas as they aim to tackle global challenges and manage crises.

The launch of Operation Sea Guardian and subsequent implementation of the EU-NATO Joint Declaration allowed for greater crisis management in the Mediterranean Sea – laying out a new framework for the promotion of greater levels of regional dialogue and an improvement of maritime security cooperation through increased presence and surveillance. A networked approach was achieved by leveraging of expertise and financial resources of both institutions.

The agreement also strengthened cooperation in counterterrorism, giving substance to their strategic partnership by creating a shared vision of combatting common security threats. This catalysed cooperation in the fight against terrorism by stepping up the exchange of information, coordinating their counter-terrorism support for partner states, and working to improve national resilience against terrorist attacks.

=== Operation Sea Guardian and Operation Sophia ===
NATO's Operation Sea Guardian was designed to operate in parallel with the EU's Operation Sophia, especially in terms of their counter-smuggling networks mandates. Both maritime operations were able to benefit from real-time information sharing and logistical support. This support ranged from offering assistance in refuelling to the exchange of advice

Operation Sophia was established predominantly to impede human trafficking and smuggling, aiming to prevent loss of life at sea The core mandate of the operation was to identify, capture, and dispose of vessels and enabling assets used or suspected of being used by migrant smugglers or traffickers. Following the peak of the migration crisis in 2015, the operation was additionally tasked with fighting illegal weapon trafficking and training the Libyan Coast Guard, as well as gathering information on all types of illegal smuggling – from humans and weapons to drugs and oil. In July 2017, NATO agreed to support Operation Sophia in the implementation of United Nations Security Council resolutions 2236 (2016) and 2357 (2017), linked to the arms embargo on Libya. Both organisations further enhanced their fight against people smuggling networks by instigating counter-terrorism activities in Libya.

Throughout the period of the establishment of Operation Sea Guardian in 2016 to the end of Operation Sophia in 2020, their similar mandates and operational convergence led to a very successful pattern of collaboration, enhancing both operations. To avoid competition and overlap between their security echelons in a shared maritime security domain, this coordination was essential. The information shared between the operations included daily operations, situational reports, sailing intentions, and schedules; preventing a duplication of tasks.

=== Operation Sea Guardian and Operation Irini ===
When the EUNAVFOR Operation Sophia ended in March 2020, it was replaced by Operation Irini. While Operation Irini has similarities in mandate and geographical focus to that of Operation Sophia, the primary task changed to a greater focus on the implementation of the UN Arms embargo on Libya.

The mandates of Operation Irini and Operation Sea Guardian are aligned as they are both oriented around the goal of upholding maritime security. Both are focused on the prevention of human smuggling and monitoring of maritime crime networks – Irini within the Libyan conflict and Sea Guardian through counterterrorism.

== Çirkin incident ==
On the 10th of June 2020, a maritime incident occurred between France and Turkey. The French frigate Courbet, flagship of the Sea Guardian force, was illuminated three times by targeting radar as it attempted to approach the Tanzanian-flagged cargo ship, Çirkin, which was under Turkish Navy escort. The radar targeting acted as a "last warning" before a missile attack. This incident occurred when Courbet acted on suspicion that the cargo ship may have been breaching UN Security Council Resolution 2473 – the United Nations arms embargo. Previously, the ship had also been stopped by a Greek frigate operating under Operation Irini, but the Turkish navy had stepped in to prevent the ship from being searched.

The Turkish government denied the French accusation that Çirkin had been carrying arms to Libya and demanded an apology, stating that the ship was instead transporting humanitarian supplies.

On 21 September 2020, the European Union sanctioned the Turkish maritime company Avrasya Shipping, which operates the freighter Çirkin, as the vessel was "found to have violated the arms embargo" imposed upon Libya in May and June 2020. The Council of the European Union made this decision in accordance with the 2011 United Nations Security Council arms embargo, after confirming that Çirkin had been used for military cargo smuggling and transportation.

As a result of this incident, France withdrew from NATO's Operation Sea Guardian. The French Defence Minister described the actions of the Turkish Navy as being "hostile" according to NATO's rules of engagement, further criticising the alliance by stating that it is not possible to "pretend that there is not, at present, a Turkish problem in NATO. It is necessary to see it, to affirm it and to address it." President Macron also brought up that the signatory states of the Berlin Conference have the commitment to "refrain from interference in the armed conflict or in the internal affairs of Libya" – stating that there had been a "explicit and serious infringement" of this agreement by Turkey. France now only participates in the EU's Operation Irini (Marghelis, 2021), ending the French Operation Sea Guardian contributions.
