= Christophe Prazuck =

French admiral (born 1960)

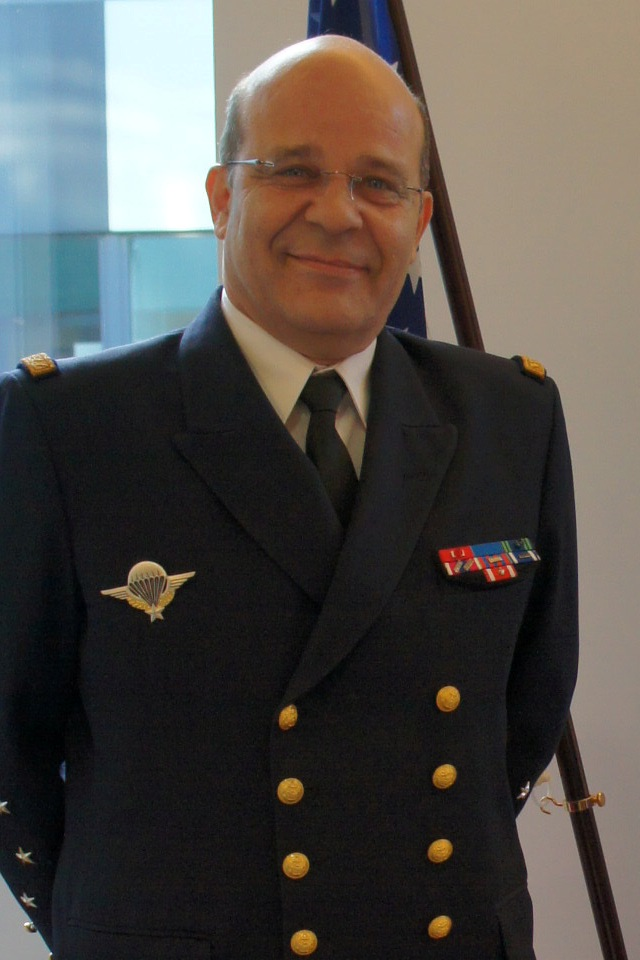
- Admiral Prazuck in 2016
- Born: Christophe Julien Roman Prazuck; 11 October 1960 (age 66); Oran, French Algeria
- Military career
- Allegiance: France
- Branch: French Navy
- Service years: 1982–2020
- Rank: Amiral
- Commands: Chief of Staff of the French Navy; FORFUSCO; SIRPA Marine; Floréal; Amphibious ship Champlain
- Awards: Grand Officer of the Legion of Honour; Knight of the National Order of Merit; Commander of the Order of Maritime Merit

Christophe Julien Roman Prazuck (French pronunciation: [kʁistɔf pʁazyk]; born 11 October 1960) is a French retired admiral who served as Chief of Staff of the French Navy from 13 July 2016 to 31 August 2020. In 2021 he was appointed director of the Institut de l'Océan at Sorbonne University.

== Early life and first assignments ==
The son of contre-amiral Stéphane Prazuck, Christophe Prazuck entered to the École navale in September 1979. After the application school on the Jeanne d'Arc, he was assigned from 1982 to 1984 on the patroller Altaïr then on the Amphibious disembarking transport ship Champlain, based in Réunion. He remained primarily in the zone around the Indian Ocean until his next posting as second commanding officer of the patroller Épée in Mayotte.

From 1984 to 1989, Prazuck joined the Submarine Forces, serving first on the Ouessant, then on the Doris as an operations officer; he was then an officer marked armes at the commission of practical studies.

From 1989 to 1991, Prazuck was a candidate at the United States Naval Postgraduate School at Monterey, California, where he obtained a Doctor of Philosophy in Physical oceanography. Following that formation, he directed naval environmental cell of Toulouse.

== Senior naval career ==
=== Commands ===
In 1994, Prazuck became second in command of the command and supply ship Var, before assuming command of the amphibious ship Camplain the following year.

In 1996, Prazuck integrated the Inter-arm Defense College (École de guerre), and became chief of the operations group (CGO) on board the anti-submarine frigate Tourville. In 1999, he assumed command of the Floréal based in Réunion.

=== Public relations ===
In 2000, Prazuck joined the Information Service and Public Relations of the Armies (French: Service d'informations et de relations publiques des armées) – Marine (SIRPA – Marine) where he exercised the function of second in command, before assuming the lead role in 2001 for a period of three years. In 2004, he was placed at the head of the Media department of Communication and Information Defense Delegation (French: Délégation à l'information et à la communication de la Défense, DICoD), then in 2006, he became the communication counselor to the Chief of the general staff headquarters of the Armies (CEMA).

=== General officer ===
On 1 August 2009, Prazuck was nominated to the rank of contre-amiral (counter admiral) and assumed, in August 2010, the commandment of Maritime Force of the Fusiliers Marins and Commandos (FORFUSCO) in Lorient.

Promoted to vice-amiral d'escadre (squadron vice-admiral), he became, in August 2010, the director of military personnel of the French Navy and deputy chief of the general staff headquarters – human resources – of the general staff headquarters of the French Navy (French: état-major de la Marine).

By a Council of Ministers decree on 6 July 2016, Prazuck was appointed Chief of Staff of the French Navy (French: Chef d'état-major de la Marine, CEMM) and was elevated to the rank designation of amiral, as of 12 July, by replacing Amiral Bernard Rogel, who had been promoted to Chief of the Military Staff of the President of the Republic (Chef d'état-major particulier du président de la République).

== Post-naval career ==
Following his retirement from the French Navy in 2020, Prazuck was appointed director of the Institut de l'Océan at Sorbonne University in 2021.

== Decorations and medals ==
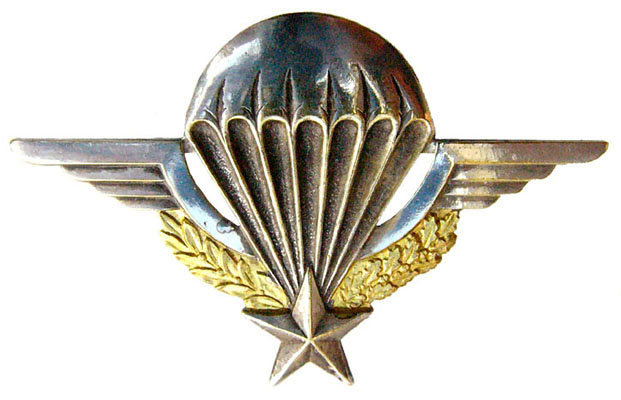

- French Parachutist Badge
- Grand Officer of the Legion of Honour (2020)
- Knight of the National Order of Merit (1997)
- Commander of the Order of Maritime Merit (2018)
- National Defence Medal (silver degree)
- French commemorative medal
- NATO Medal for ex-Yugoslavia
- Commander's Cross Order pro Merito Melitensi, military version (Sovereign Military Order of Malta)
- Order of Naval Merit, Grand Officer (Brazil)
- Order of Merit "Tamanduré" (Brazil)
- Honorary Officer of the Order of Australia (Australia) – For distinguished service to developing the defence relationship between Australia and France through commitment, leadership and strategic foresight as Chief of Staff of the French Navy.
- Order of Merit of the Italian Republic, Commander

== Notes and references ==
Military offices
Preceded by Bernard Rogel	Chief of Staff of the French Navy; 2016–2020	Succeeded by Pierre Vandier
