= European Maritime Force =

Non-standing rapid reaction force capable of naval, air and amphibious operations

- Active: 1995–present
- Country: France; Italy; Portugal; Spain
- Branch: Navy
- Type: Rapid reaction force
- Motto: At Sea for Peace

Commanders
- Current commander: Vice-Almirante José Rafael Salvado de Figueiredo

Insignia
- Flag

The European Maritime Force (EUROMARFOR or EMF) is a non-standing, military force with the current participation of France, Italy, Portugal, and Spain. The force may carry out naval, air and amphibious operations, with an activation time of 5 days after an order is received.

The force was formed in 1995 to fulfill missions defined in the Petersberg Declaration, such as sea control, humanitarian missions, peacekeeping operations, crisis response operations, and peace enforcement.

The force can also be deployed for other international organizations, such as NATO, the United Nations, or the Organization for Security and Co-operation in Europe.

== History ==
- 19 June 1992: Petersberg Declaration. The concept for forces answerable to the Western European Union is established.

In June 1992, the Petersberg tasks were set out, defining which potential missions that could be assumed by the Western European Union in the new post-Cold War situation. Consequently, the identification of forces needed to carry out such missions was required.

- 28 October 1993: Ministers meeting in Grosseto, Italy. The wish to create an international maritime force is stated.

The following September a ministerial meeting between the governments of Spain, Portugal, France and Italy resolved their willingness to create an international maritime force. This led to the signing of the constitutive document of the European Maritime Force in Lisbon on 15 May 1995. The force came into existence on 2 October 1995, with the appointment of the Spanish Admiral Acedo Manteola (then Alflot) as its first commander.

- 15 May 1995: Lisbon Conference, signing of the Constitutive Document.

The first activation of the force was made with exercise EOLO 96 in April 1996.

A number of operations and exercises were undertaken in the following years. The first was Operation Coherent Behaviour in the eastern Mediterranean Sea in 2002. During this operation, EMF was in close cooperation with NATO in the frame of Operation Active Endeavour. This was the first autonomous operation in the history of the force, and was carried out based on a mandate given by the participating nations.

Upon the completion of this first participation in RWO (Real World Operation), another challenge was taken up by EMF and the force activated to take part in a new RWO. Thus, in 2003, EMF took part in Operation Resolute Behaviour in Indian Ocean in support of an international coalition's Operation Enduring Freedom and gradually embedded into it between 2003 and 2005. The participation of EMF in an operation like this, demonstrated the EMF Nations' cohesion and their commitment to fight together with the international community against terrorism.

During this period, by the participation in RWO but also through a demanding program of co-operational exercises with the countries of the south Mediterranean Sea, the visibility and the international recognition of EMF were increased significantly. EMF participated also in Operation UNIFIL between 2008 and 2009, under the aegis of the United Nations. During this activation, the EMF at sea Commander acted as CTF 448. Once again EMF demonstrated its flexibility and its capability of acting under the aegis of a different organization. This was a historical milestone not only for EMF, but even for the UN, because it was the first UN direct operation.

The highlight of the cooperation with EU occurred between 2011 and 2016, where for nine rotations (36 months), the EUROMARFOR, assumed the Command of EUNAVFOR’s Counter Piracy Operation ATALANTA, with extremely good results.

In 2020 (27 May – 16 June), EMF supported NATO’s Operation SEA GUARDIAN in the CMED, under COM MARCOM’s Operational Control.

In 2025, the cooperation with EU restarted with the involvement of EMF on 3 ATALANTA rotations, starting on February 19, 2025, with EMF assuming the tactical command of the Force.

== Structure ==
The EMF is a non-standing force, and its composition, drawing on participating states' navies, varies depending on the nature of each mission. The size of EMF may range from a small Task Group to a large Task Force including carrier and amphibious groups, escorts and support vessels. Additionally, maritime patrol aircraft, mine countermeasure units, submarines or other types of naval units could be employed, depending on the mission and its related tasks.

From the moment when the member nations take the decision to intervene in a crisis by employing the EMF, the CIMIN directs COMEUROMARFOR to activate the force. After consultation with the CIMIN, CEMF and national authorities, participating nations define the volume and nature of their involvement. Subsequently, they assign units to EMF. COMEUROMARFOR assembles the assigned units and gets their operational control as required.

EMF members.

=== Commander ===
Name	Title	Nationality	Term of office
Manuel Acedo Manteola	Almirante	Spain	2 October 1995
Philippe Durteste	Vice-Amiral d’Escadre	France	7 October 1996
Umberto Guarnieri	Ammiraglio di Squadra	Italy	22 October 1997
Paolo Giardini	Ammiraglio di Squadra	Italy	14 February 1998
Reis Rodrigues	Vice-Almirante	Portugal	9 October 1998
Francisko Rapallo Comendador	Almirante	Spain	14 October 1999
Quinto Gramellini	Ammiraglio di Squadra	Italy	14 September 2001
Alain Dumontet	Vice-Amiral d’Escadre	France	16 September 2003
Angel Tello Valero	Almirante	Spain	20 September 2005
Fernando Armada Vadillo	Almirante	Spain	31 August 2006
Giuseppe Lertora	Ammiraglio di Squadra	Italy	17 September 2007
Luigi Binelli Mantelli	Ammiraglio di Squadra	Italy	29 April 2009
José Saldanha Lopes	Vice-Almirante	Portugal	15 September 2009
José Monteiro Montenegro	Vice-Almirante	Portugal	28 November 2010
Xavier Magne	Vice-Amiral d’Escadre	France	15 September 2011
Santiago Bolibar Piñeiro	Almirante	Spain	18 September 2013
D. Francisco Javier Franco Suanzes	Almirante	Spain	29 July 2015
Filippo Maria Foffi	Ammiraglio di Squadra	Italy	17 September 2015
Donato Marzano	Ammiraglio di Squadra	Italy	16 September 2016
Henrique Gouveia e Melo	Vice-Almirante	Portugal	19 September 2017
Jean-Philippe Rolland	Vice-Amiral d'Escadre	France	19 September 2019
Xavier Baudouard	Vice-Amiral d'Escadre	France	1 August 2020
Eugénio Diaz del Rio	Almirante	Spain	22 September 2021
Aurelio De Carolis	Ammiraglio di Squadra	Italy	26 September 2023
José Rafael Salvado de Figueiredo	Vice-Almirante	Portugal	15 September 2025

=== High Level Inter-Ministerial Committee ===
The High Level Inter-Ministerial Committee (CIMIN) is at the top level of EMF organization. The body is composed by Chiefs of Defence (CHOD), Political Head Directorates of Defence and Foreign Affairs Ministries and credited representatives of participating nations. The CIMIN ensures the politico-military direction of the participating countries establishes the conditions for the employment of the force and issues directives to COMEUROMARFOR. CIMIN meetings are convoked when necessary, at the request of any of the member states.

==== Politico-Military Working Group ====
The Politico-Military Working Group (POLMIL WG) is the executive body of CIMIN. The POLMIL WG is composed by the representatives from the CHOD's and from the Ministry of Foreign Affairs of the member countries. It takes care of all the activities related to the development and external relations of the Force and ensures the implementation of the CIMIN decisions. The POLMIL WG also appoints a Staff of the EMF countries to act as CIMIN Secretariat, for the conduct of its daily activities and to act as the permanent interlocutor of the CEMF.

===== Sub working group =====
Under the POLMIL WG is the EUROMARFOR Sub working group (EMF SWG). EMF SWG is composed by representatives from each one of the Nation's Naval General Staffs mainly to advise the POLMIL WG on specific Naval issues and to express the single National Naval Staff's view on specific issues of own competence and co-ordinate positions and actions to be taken.

=== Operational level ===
At the operational level of the chain of command, there is the Commander of the European Maritime Force (CEMF or COMEUROMARFOR), who is designated every two years among the National Naval Authorities (NNAs) entities namely:

- Commandant de la Force d'action navale (ALFAN)
- Comandante in Capo della Squadra Navale (CINCNAV)
- Comando Naval (COMNAV)
- Almirante de la Flota (ALFLOT)

The CEMF relies both on his own existing National Staff and the EMF Permanent Cell (EMFPC) for the accomplishment of the assigned duties. The EMF is composed by Director who is an Officer of the same nationality as the CEMF and four representatives (Commanders or Lieutenant Commanders), one from each EMF Nation. Additionally, from 2001 to 2018 one Officer from Greece and one from Turkey joined the permanent cell as observers.

== Operations ==
- October – 30 November 2002: First activation for an Operation Coherent Behaviour, in the Eastern Mediterranean
- 14 January 2003 – 12 December 2005: Second activation for an Operation Resolute Behaviour, in the framework of Operation Enduring Freedom, in the Indian Ocean;
- 29 February 2008 – 28 February 2009: Third Activation for an Operation: EMF held UNIFIL Maritime Task Force (MTF) command responsibilities in the UN Peacekeeping Operation Impartial Behavior in Lebanon. 12 months of EMF leadership, for the first time under UN aegis;
- 6 December 2011 – 23 March 2016: Nine activations carried out for participating in the EUNAVFOR Operation Atalanta in the Indian Ocean;
- 27 May 2020 – 16 June 2020: EMF supported NATO’s Operation SEA GUARDIAN in the CMED, under COM MARCOM’s Operational Control;
- 19 February 2025 - ongoing: EMF activated again in the EUNAVFOR Operation Atalanta in the Indian Ocean.

== Relationship with EU Defence Policy ==
The EMF is presently not established at the EU level (referred to as the Common Security and Defence Policy, CSDP); it is for instance not a project of the Permanent Structured Cooperation (PESCO) of the CSDP. The EMF may however contribute in the implementation of the CSDP, when made available as a multinational force in accordance with article 42.3 of the Treaty on European Union (TEU). A Letter of Intent was signed by the Director General EUMS (LtGen van der Laan) and the commander pro-tempore of the EUROMARFOR (Vice-admiral de Carolis) on January 16, 2025, in order to provide an agreed-upon framework for potential bilateral cooperation in accordance with the revised EU Maritime Security Strategy (EUMSS).

== See also ==
- Common Security and Defence Policy
- European Corps
- European Gendarmerie Force
- European Rapid Operational Force, a related, now-defunct force established by the same four participating states as the EMF
- EU Battlegroup
