= Bernard Rogel =

French admiral (born 1956)

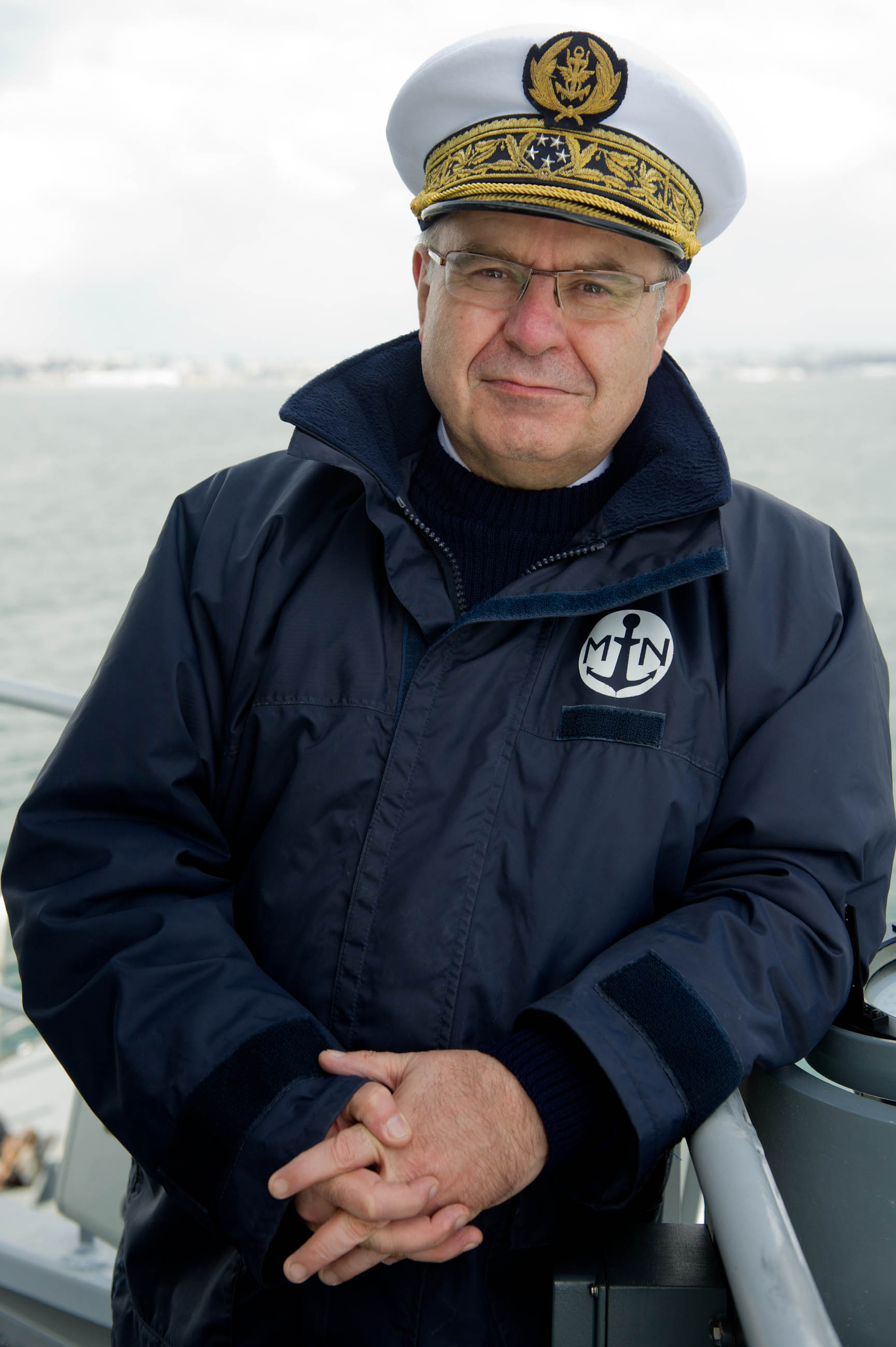
- Portrait, 2012
- Born: Bernard Émile Marc Rogel; 5 January 1956 (age 70); Brest, Finistère, France
- Military career
- Allegiance: France
- Branch: French Navy
- Service years: 1976–2020
- Rank: Amiral
- Commands: Chief of the Military Staff of the President of the Republic; Chief of Staff of the French Navy; Force Océanique Stratégique; Submarine Forces of France; L'Inflexible; Saphir; Casabianca
- Awards: Grand Officer of the Legion of Honour; Grand Cross of the National Order of Merit; Commander of the Order of Maritime Merit

Bernard Émile Marc Rogel (French pronunciation: [bɛʁnaʁ ʁɔʒɛl]; born 5 January 1956) is a French admiral who served as Chief of Staff of the French Navy from 12 September 2011 to 6 July 2016 and Chief of the Military Staff of the President of the Republic from 13 July 2016 until 1 August 2020.

== Early life and career ==
Bernard Rogel entered to the École navale (French: École navale) in 1976. He was first assigned to serve on nuclear attack submarines and nuclear ballistic missile submarines; in 1989, he obtained his Atomic brevet.

== Naval career ==
=== Commandments ===
Rogel assumed commandment of the nuclear attack submarine Casabianca and Saphir from 1990 to 1992. He became the drill officer in charge of executive instructions and tactical maneuvering at the corps of the Submarine Squadron of the Mediterranean, with the particular responsibility of training and qualifying competent boat commandants and crew members, capable of fitting service on nuclear attack submarines, in addition to the placement effects of materials and tactical submarine evolutions.

Admitted as a candidate at the Inter-Arm Defense College (French: École de Guerre) at Paris in 1994, Rogel became then second-in-command of the anti-submarine frigate Tourville then SNLE L'Indomptable.

Rogel then worked at the general staff headquarters of the Armies EMA, as an assistant «Mer» (sea) to the cabinet of the Chief of the general staff headquarters of the Armies from January 1998 until April 2000. He reassumed a commandment from April 2000 until December 2011, on the French nuclear ballistic missile submarine SNLE L'Inflexible with whom he conducted two operational patrols, then joined in January 2002 the general staff headquarters of the amiral, commanding the Force océanique stratégique FOST, where he was division chief of «Conduite des opérations» (operations conduit), then chief of that general staff headquarters function.

=== General staff headquarters functions ===
Auditor of the Institut des hautes études de Défense nationale IHEDN and the Centre des hautes études militaires CHEM during the academic years 2003–2004, Rogel joined after the Élysée as assistant to the Chief of the Military Staff of the President of the Republic, charged with the concerned maritime dossiers and the sequence of exterior military operations.

From September 2006 to August 2009, Rogel was the cabinet chief to the Chief of the general staff headquarters of the Armies CEMA, then deputy chief of general staff «Opérations» (operations) of the general staff headquarters of the Armies EMA directing for two years the inter-arm exterior operations. Simultaneously under his responsibility featured various commands including the inter-arm space commandment, the cyber defense of the Armies, the inter-arm commandment of helicopters and assumed the lead role of numerous other divisions of the EMA. Admiral Rogel totalized 27,000 hours of diving.

On 12 September 2011, Rogel assumed the functions of Chief of Staff of the French Navy CEMM and was elevated to the rank designation of amiral on the same date. By a decree on 6 July 2016, he was nominated by President François Hollande to become Chief of the Military Staff of the President of the Republic as of 13 July. He was confirmed in his functions by the new President of the Republic, Emmanuel Macron.

== Decorations and medals ==
Grand Officer of the Order of the Legion of Honour
Grand Cross of the Order of National Merit
Commander of the Order of Maritime Merit
National Defence Medal (Silver)
Grand Officer with swords of the Order pro Merito Melitensi, Military
Portugal, Grand Cross of the Military Merit Medal
Grand Officer of the Order of Naval Merit (Brazil)
Order of Merit of the Federal Republic of Germany, Commander's Cross
Commander of the US Legion of Merit
Commander of the National Order of the Ivory Coast
National Order of Chad, Officer
Central African Republic, Knight of the Order of National Recognition
Morocco, Order of Military Merit, 3rd Class
Mauritania, Commander of the National Order of Merit
Polish Army Medal in bronze
Spain, Grand Cross of Naval Merit with white decoration

== See also ==
- Édouard Guillaud
- Pierre-François Forissier

== Notes and references ==
Military offices
Preceded by Pierre-François Forissier	Chief of Staff of the French Navy; 2011–2016	Succeeded by Christophe Prazuck
Preceded by Benoît Puga	Chief of the Military Staff of the President of the Republic; 2016–2020	Succeeded by Jean-Philippe Rolland
