= Fabien Mandon =

French Air and Space Force officer (born 1969)

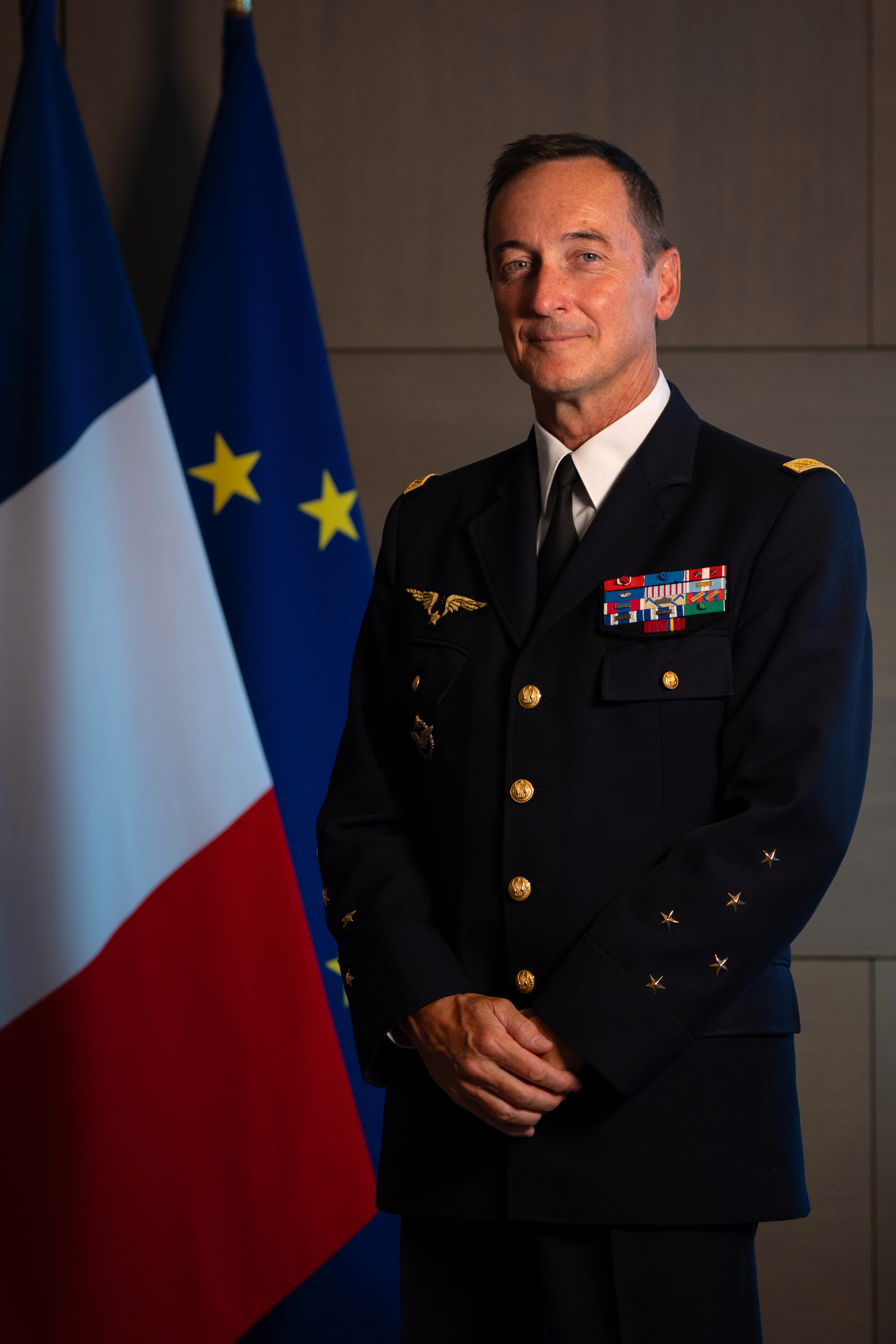
- Official portrait, 2025

Chief of the Defence Staff
- Incumbent
- Assumed office 1 September 2025
- Preceded by: Thierry Burkhard

Chief of the Military Staff of the President of the Republic
- In office 1 May 2023 – 1 September 2025
- Preceded by: Jean-Philippe Rolland
- Succeeded by: Vincent Giraud

Personal details
- Born: Fabien André Hervé Mandon; 19 October 1969 (age 56) Montmorency, Val-d'Oise, France
- Education: École de l'air et de l'espace

Military service
- Allegiance: France
- Branch/service: French Air and Space Force
- Years of service: 1993 – present
- Rank: Air Army General
- Commands: Chief of the Defence Staff; Chief of the Military Staff of the President of the Republic; Head of the Minister of Defence's Military Cabinet; Avord Air Base (BA 702); Escadron de Chasse 2/3 Champagne; Colmar Squadron, Escadron de chasse 1/30 Alsace
- Battles/wars: Operation Almandin; Second Congo War (Operation Artemis); War in Afghanistan (International Security Assistance Force (ISAF)); NATO intervention in Libya (Operation Harmattan, Operation Unified Protector); Chadian–Libyan War (Operation Épervier)

Air Force General Fabien André Hervé Mandon (French pronunciation: [fabjɛ̃ mɑ̃dɔ̃]; born 19 October 1969) is a French Air and Space Force officer who currently serves as the incumbent Chief of the Defence Staff of the French Armed Forces since 1 September 2025. Prior to his appointment to the post, Mandon served as the Chief of the Military Staff of the President of the Republic from 1 May 2023 to 1 September 2025 and as Head of the Minister of Defence's Military Cabinet from 1 September 2020 to 30 April 2023.

A local of Montmorency, Val-d'Oise, Mandon was commissioned in the French Air and Space Force after graduating from the École de l'air et de l'espace in 1993 and later completed fighter pilot training in 1994. Mandon would later serve as fighter pilot of the Dassault Mirage F1 and the Dassault Mirage 2000D. As a fighter pilot, Mandon completed a total of 144 missions across his deployments in Afghanistan and Western Africa. Mandon is also the 6th Air and Space Force officer and the first officer in 27 years to be named as the Chief of Defence Staff.

== Early life and education ==
Mandon was born on 19 October 1969 in Montmorency, Val-d'Oise, and is a son of an engineer and a physiotherapist who became a shopkeeper. During his younger years, Mandon developed a love and passion for football and eventually joined the youth team of the Olympique Lyonnais professional football club. Mandon developed a fascination in piloting and prepared for entering the entrance exam in military schools. Mandon would entered the École de l'air et de l'espace in 1990 as part of the "Lieutenant Poznanki" class and was commissioned as a second lieutenant on 1 August 1993. He completed his training as a fighter pilot in 1994. Aside from completing his fighter pilot training, Mandon also completed the Armed Forces Staff Course at the Spanish Armed Forces Higher School (ESFAS) in 2004 to 2005 and the Advanced Officer Course at the Institut des hautes études de défense nationale in 2015.

== Military career ==
After completing his pilot training in 1994, Mandon was first assigned under the Escadron de chasse 1/30 Alsace, where he flew the Dassault Mirage F1 and was later promoted to the rank of captain on 1 August 1996. He would later be deployed to the Central African Republic to assist in French operations under Operation Almandin, which focuses on negotiations between the Central African Armed Forces and coup leaders. Mandon would later serve as commander of the Colmar Squadron under the same squadron from 1999 up to his promotion to the rank of commandant on 1 November 2001 until the end of his time in the squadron in 2002, where he was later assigned as an aerospace advisor under the Delegation for Strategic Affairs (DAS). Mandon would also later be deployed into the Democratic Republic of Congo, where he was involved in Operation Artemis during the Second Congo War. On 1 November 2005, Mandon was promoted to the rank of lieutenant colonel and would later serve as commander of the Escadron de Chasse 2/3 Champagne, where he would eventually fly the Dassault Mirage 2000D.

During his time as commander of the Escadron de Chasse 2/3 Champagne, Mandon was deployed to Dushanbe Airport in Tajikistan and in Kandahar Airfield in Afghanistan, where he carried out aerial missions such as ground support and bombardment runs during the War in Afghanistan until 2007. In 2008, Mandon served under the office of the Deputy Chief of Staff and Programmes and was later promoted to the rank of colonel on 1 September 2009. Mandon would later be involved in the Operation Épervier during the Chadian–Libyan War and eventually both Opération Harmattan and Operation Unified Protector in 2011 as part of the NATO intervention in Libya as the NATO task force's deputy chief for air strategy.

In 2012, Mandon was named as commander of the Avord Air Base, and in 2014, he was named as the auditor for the 64th session of the Centre des Hautes Études Militaires (CHEM) and the 67th session of the Institut des hautes études de défense nationale (IHEDN). Mandon would eventually join the Direction Générale des Relations Internationales et de la Stratégie (DGRIS) in 2015 and was placed in charge of the international relations matters of the Ministry of Defence. From July 2017 to September 2019, Mandon served as the air deputy of the Chief of the Military Staff of the President of the Republic and was eventually promoted to the rank of brigadier general on 1 July 2018. After his term, Mandon was later named as the chief of the capability coherence division of the Defence Staff Office and held the position from September 2019 to 1 September 2020, where he was promoted to the rank of air division general. After his term at the Defence Staff Office, Mandon would later be named as the Head of the Minister of Defence's Military Cabinet on 1 September 2020 and earned the rank of air corps general.

After his stint as Head of the Minister of Defence's Military Cabinet, Mandon would later serve as the Chief of the Military Staff of the President of the Republic from 1 May 2023 to 1 September 2025 and later earned the rank of air army general. On 23 July 2025, Mandon was appointed by President Emmanuel Macron as the new Chief of the Defence Staff, and eventually took the position on 1 September 2025, where he replaced Army General Thierry Burkhard. Throughout his career as a fighter pilot, Mandon completed a total of 144 missions across his deployments in Afghanistan, Chad, Central African Republic, and the Democratic Republic of Congo. As Chief of the Defence Staff, Mandon highlighted his key priorities under his command, namely capability modernization, strengthening national and operational resilience, and streamlining the armed forces' adaptability & command structure through integration, delegation, and strengthening the local defense industry.

During his stint as the Chief of Defence, Mandon became known for his straightforward approach as he stated during the congress of mayors that France must "prepare to lose its children in war", and cited that the biggest weakness in the current volatile situation is "the lack of a will to fight". Mandon also urged mayors that they have a role to play as the country also lack spirit, stating that "the spirit which accepts that we will have to suffer if we are to protect what we are". Mandon's comments drew criticisms from some members of the left and the nationalist right, as they view the comments as "out of place" and "warmongering" while other politicians, as well as the Minister of the Armed Forces Catherine Vautrin and Government Spokeswoman Maud Bregeon state that Mandon is right and came to the defence of Mandon's comments, adding that "Our policy is to do everything to avoid war but at the same time prepare, and consolidate that collective moral force without which no nation can survive the test". Mandon's comments also earned him the moniker of " General faux Bisounours" (fake Care Bear general) by the L'Express.

== Dates of promotion ==
Cadet	Aspirant	Sub-lieutenant	Lieutenant	Captain	Commandant
1990	1991	1992	1993	1 August 1996	1 November 2001
Lieutenant colonel	Colonel	Brigade general	Division general	Corps general	Army general
1 November 2005	1 September 2009	1 July 2018	1 July 2020	1 September 2021	1 May 2023

== Awards in military service ==
=== National honours ===
- Grand Officier, Legion of Honour – awarded in 2026
- Commander, Legion of Honour – awarded in 2023
- Officer, Legion of Honour – awarded in 2017
- Knight, Legion of Honour – awarded in 2008
- Officer, Ordre national du Mérite – awarded in 2014
- Cross for Military Valour with two bronze stars
- Aeronautical Medal
- Combatant's Cross
- Overseas Medal with the Chad clasp
- Silver grade, National Defence Medal
- Medal of the Nation's Gratitude
- French Commemorative Medal
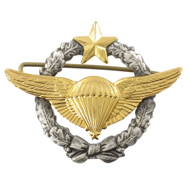
- French Air and Space Force Parachutist Badge (Badge de chuteur qualifié de l'armée aérienne)

=== Foreign honours ===
- Grand Officer of the Order of Merit of the Italian Republic (Italy, 2026)
- Officer of the Order of the Oak Crown (Luxembourg, 2026)
- Officer of the National Order of the Lion (Senegal)
- First Class of the Order of Merit (Ukraine, 2025)
- NATO Medal for ISAF
- NATO Medal for Operation Unified Protector

== Personal life ==
Mandon is married and has three children. Aside from his interests in aviation and football, Mandon is also known as an avid reader, and his favorite books are Pierre Clostermann’s "Le Grand Cirque" and Tom Wolfe’s "The Right Stuff".
