= Thierry Burkhard =

French Army general (born 1964)

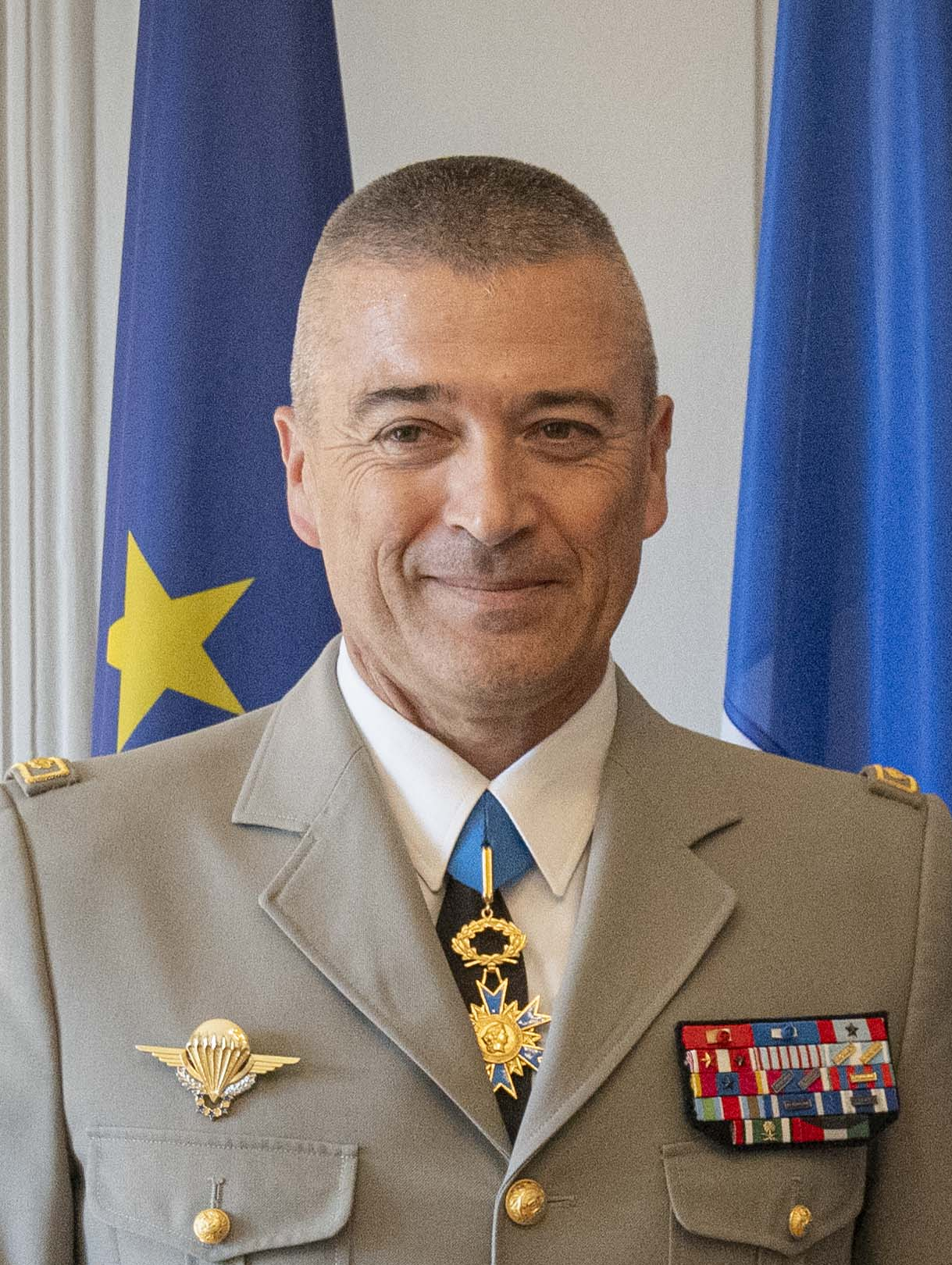
- General Burkhard in 2024

Chief of the Defence Staff
- In office 22 July 2021 – 1 September 2025
- Preceded by: François Lecointre
- Succeeded by: Fabien Mandon

Chief of Staff of the French Army
- In office 31 July 2019 – 21 July 2021
- Preceded by: Jean-Pierre Bosser
- Succeeded by: Pierre Schill

Personal details
- Born: Thierry Marcel Ernest Burkhard; 30 July 1964 (age 62) Delle, France

Military service
- Allegiance: France
- Branch/service: French Army
- Years of service: 1989–2025
- Rank: Army General
- Commands: Chief of the Defence Staff; Chief of Staff of the French Army; Inspector of the French Army; Centre for Planning and Execution of Operations; 13th Demi-Brigade of the Foreign Legion
- Battles/wars: Gulf War (Opération Daguet); UNPROFOR (Bosnian War); First Ivorian Civil War (Opération Licorne); ISAF

Thierry Marcel Ernest Burkhard (French pronunciation: [tjɛʁi byʁkaʁ]; born 30 July 1964) is a French Army general who served as Chief of the Defence Staff from 22 July 2021 to 1 September 2025. Prior to his appointment to the top post, Burkhard served as Chief of Staff of the French Army from 2019 to 2021 and Inspector of the French Army from 2018 to 2019.

As an officer, Burkhard was deployed overseas in a variety of missions. He served in the 2nd Foreign Parachute Regiment (2^{e} REP) and held command of the 13th Demi-Brigade of the Foreign Legion (13^{e} DBLE) in Djibouti.

== Early life and education ==
A native of Delle, Territoire de Belfort, Burkhard enrolled at Saint-Cyr Military Academy in 1985 and completed infantry courses at the École de l'infanterie from 1988 to 1989. Burkhard also completed the Advanced Staff Course at École supérieure de guerre in 2000.

== Military career ==
After a year of post-academy training, Burkhard graduated as infantry and was posted for continual service in the 2nd Foreign Parachute Regiment in Corsica. He served the regiment from 1989 to 1996, where he was first served in the operations command in overseas missions such as in Iraq during the Gulf War in 1991, where he was part of the units deployed for Opération Daguet and was later deployed to Bosnia during the Yugoslavia Crisis on 1992 to 1993 as part of the United Nations Protection Force during the Bosnian War. In 1996, Burkhard was appointed a member of the Joint Staff at the Centre for Planning and Execution of Operations (CPCO) in Paris. Burkhard later served as an operations officer in the 4th Foreign Regiment. He was deployed on missions in Gabon and Chad.

Burkhard served as the head of the operations division at the Armed Forces based in French Guiana from 2002 to 2004, and later served under Joint Staff as deputy to the J3 EUROPE/CPCO. Burkhard would later be involved on Opération Licorne in 2006 during the civil war in Ivory Coast, before serving as a deputy under Admiral Christophe Prazuck in 2007. Burkhard served as a deputy communications adviser to the Chief of the Defence Staff from 2007 to 2008, and was later deployed to Afghanistan as part of the International Security Assistance Force (ISAF). Burkhard would serve as the commander of the 13th Demi-Brigade of the Foreign Legion (13^{e} DBLE) in Djibouti from 2008 until 2010, at which date he joined the Information and Public Relations Service of the Armed Forces, being named as the communications adviser to the Chief of the Defence Staff, a position he held until 2013.

In 2013, he became the military adviser to the National Intelligence Coordinator at the presidency. He was named as deputy commander of the Centre for Planning and Execution of Operations from August 2015 to August 2017, and thereafter served as commander of the same unit. In August 2018, he was appointed Inspector of the French Army.

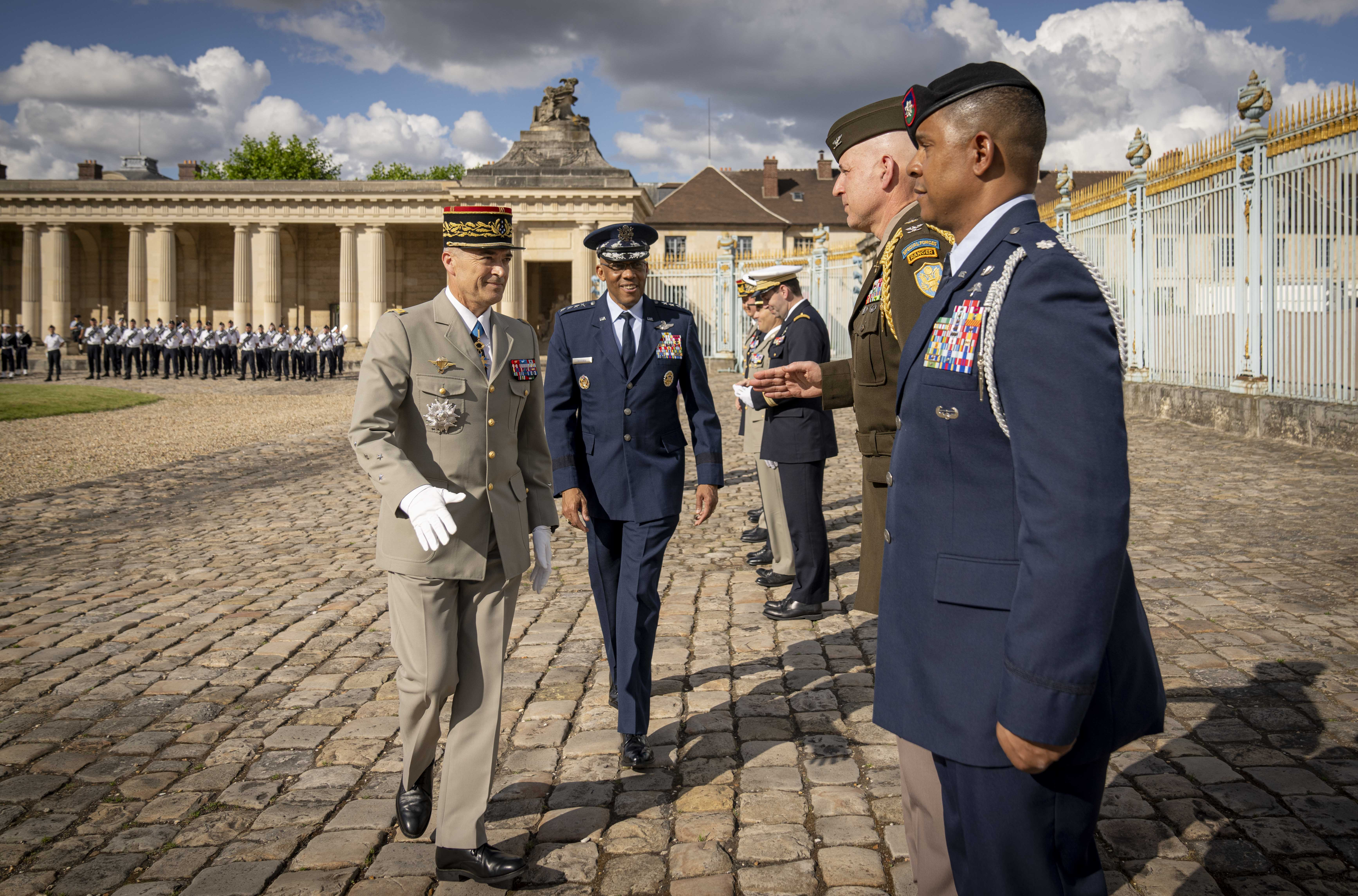
General Burkhard with Charles Q. Brown Jr. at the École Militaire, Paris on 5 June 2024

Burkhard was appointed Chief of the French Army in July 2019, before being named Chief of the Defence Staff in July 2021. His appointment came after the announcement of the resignation of General François Lecointre on 13 July 2021 as a move to avoid being dragged in political debates before the 2022 French presidential election and on the initiation of drawing down military operations in Mali. During the Russian invasion of Ukraine in 2022, General Burkhard supported the initiatives made by President Emmanuel Macron to deliver weapons, vehicles, and supplies to Ukraine. In March 2024, amidst the plans to the deployment of troops to Ukraine, Burkhard supported the proposal made by President Macron and echoed his words on the possibility of further involvement in Ukraine, which includes manning weapon systems, training Ukrainian troops, initiate cyber attacks on Russian positions and demining operations. On 23 July 2025, General Fabien Mandon was appointed to succeed him.

== Dates of promotion ==
Cadet	Aspirant	Sub-lieutenant	Lieutenant	Captain	Commandant
1985	1986	1987	1988	1992	1997
Lieutenant colonel	Colonel	Brigade general	Division general	Corps general	Army general
2001	2005	2014	2017	2018	2019

== Honours and decorations ==
=== National honours ===
- Grand Cross of the National Order of the Legion of Honour (5 September 2025)
- Commander of the National Order of Merit (26 April 2016)
- Cross for Military Valour – Silver-Gilt Star
- Croix de guerre des théâtres d'opérations extérieures – Bronze star
- National Defence Medal – Bronze star
- Combatant's Cross
- Overseas Medal
- Military Health Service honour medal
- French commemorative medal

=== Foreign honours ===
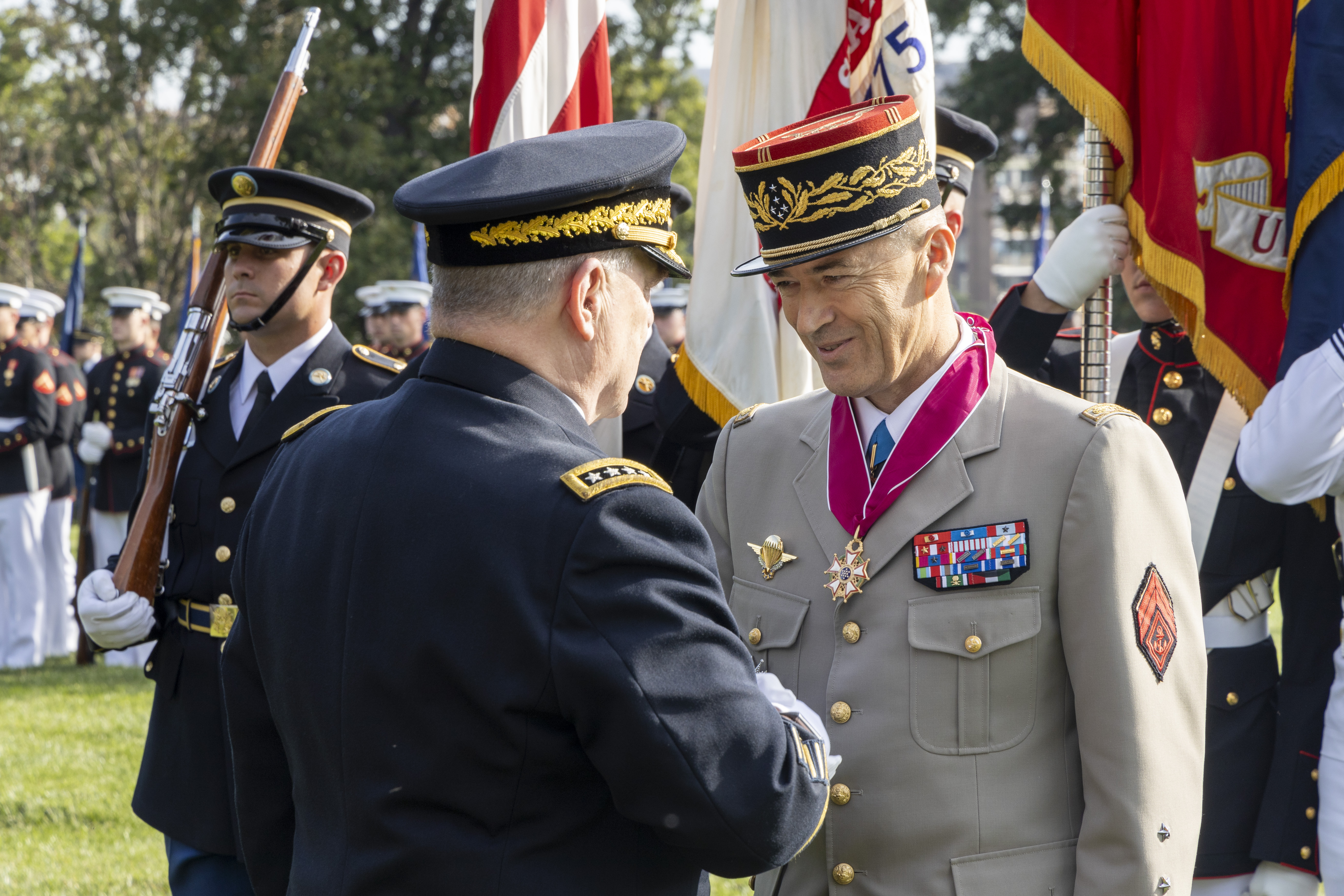
On 21 September 2023, in Virginia, General Burkhard was presented with the insignia of Commander of the Legion of Merit by General Mark Milley.

- Honorary Officer of the Order of Australia (Australia, 8 May 2024)
- Second Class of the Order of the Cross of the Eagle (Estonia, 24 February 2024)
- Commander of the Order of Merit of the Federal Republic of Germany (Germany, 22 November 2024)
- Grand Officer of the Order of Merit of the Italian Republic (Italy, 8 April 2023)
- Officer of the Order of the Oak Crown (Luxembourg, 26 August 2025)
- Kuwait Liberation Medal (Saudi Arabia) (KSA)
- Kuwait Liberation Medal (Kuwait)
- NATO Medal for the former Yugoslavia (NATO)
- NATO Kosovo Medal
- NATO Medal for Operation Unified Protector
- NATO Medal for ISAF
- Commander's Cross of the Order of Merit of the Republic of Poland (Poland, April 2026)
- Medal of the General Staff of the Polish Armed Forces (Poland, April 2026)
- Gold Polish Army Medal (Poland, 29 March 2024)
- Commander of the Order of the Star of Romania (Romania, 21 December 2022)
- Commander of the National Order of the Lion (Senegal, 19 March 2023)
- Commander of the Order pro Merito Melitensi (Sovereign Military Order of Malta)
- UNPROFOR Medal (United Nations)
- Commander of the Legion of Merit (United States, 21 September 2023)
- Order of the Rising Sun, 2nd Class, Gold and Silver Star (Japan, 3 November 2026)

=== Badges ===
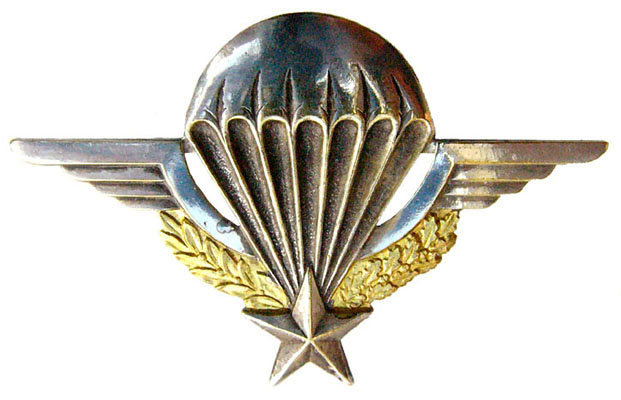
- French Parachutist Badge
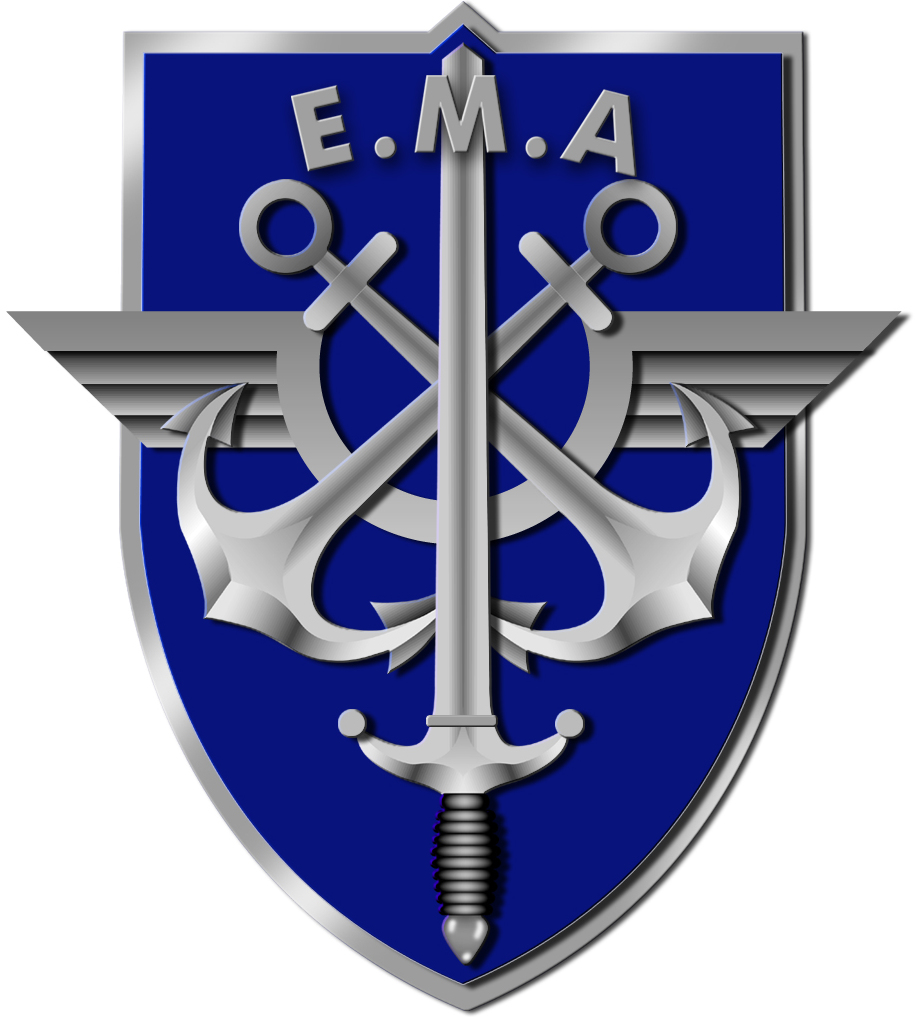
- Chief of the Defence Staff Badge

== Personal life ==
Burkhard came from a family of Protestants. He is married and has three children.

== Citations ==
- "France's army chief Lecointre steps down, replaced by general Burkhard". Arab News. Reuters. 13 June 2021.
- Anita (22 July 2021). "who is General Thierry Burkhard, future chief of staff of the armed forces". News.in.24.
- "Général d'armée Thierry BURKHARD – Chef d'état-major des armées" (PDF). North Atlantic Treaty Organization.
- "General Thierry Burkhard". AUSA. 4 November 2020.

Military offices
Preceded by Army General Jean-Pierre Bosser	Chief of Staff of the French Army; 2019–2021	Succeeded by Army General Pierre Schill
Preceded by Army General François Lecointre	Chief of the Defence Staff; 2021–2025	Succeeded by Army General Fabien Mandon
