= Jacques Lanxade =

French admiral

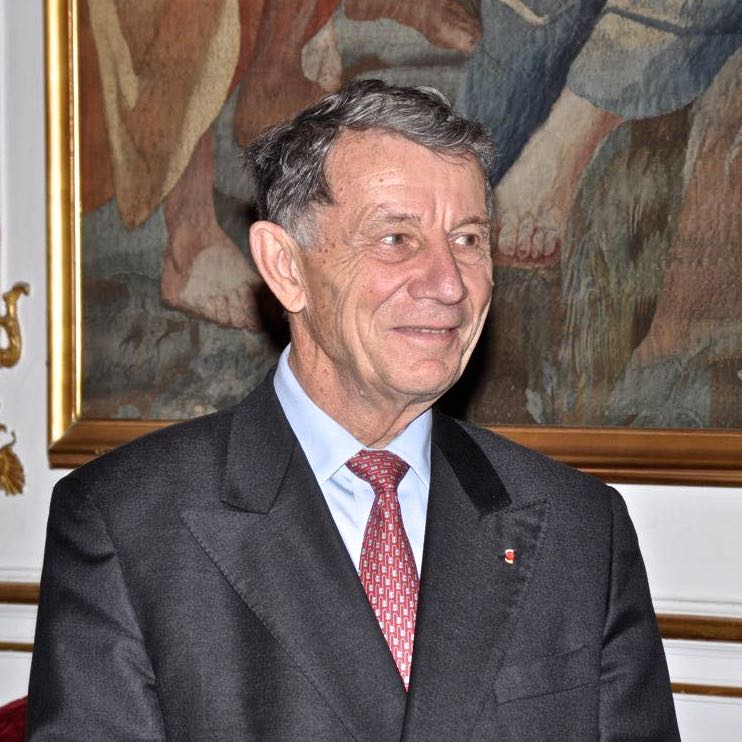
Jacques Lanxade, 2010

Jacques Lanxade (born 8 September 1934) is a French admiral and former navy chief, and co-author of a proposed reform of NATO.

He was a private chief of staff of François Mitterrand, President of the French Republic, from 1989 to 1991, and became chief of defense of the French Armed Forces from 1991 to 1995. It was during this period that the Rwandan genocide took place in 1994.

Lanxade is also a former ambassador to Tunisia. As of 2008, he is the chairman of the Académie de Marine, and President of the Mediterranean Foundation for Strategic Research. He is also a member of the international committee of patronage of the French journal Politique américaine, dedicated to the study of internal and international stratagems of the United States.

Military offices
Preceded by Maurice Schmitt	Chief of the Defence Staff; 24 April 1991 – 8 September 1995	Succeeded by Jean-Philippe Douin
