= COVID-19 vaccination in Portugal =

Immunization plan against COVID-19 in Portugal

Portuguese vaccination campaign against COVID-19
- Vaccination plan task force patch
- Date: 27 December 2020 – present
- Location: Portugal
- Cause: COVID-19 pandemic in Portugal
- Target: Full immunisation of people in Portugal against COVID-19
- Organised by: COVID-19 Vaccination Plan Task Force
- Participants: 9,821,414 people have received at least one vaccine dose 8,909,769 people have been fully vaccinated
- Outcome: 94.28% of Portugal's population have received at least one vaccine dose 85.53% of Portugal's population have been fully vaccinated
- Website: www.sns24.gov.pt/pt/tema/vacinas/vacinacao-gripe-e-covid-19/

The Portuguese vaccination campaign against COVID-19 is an ongoing mass immunisation campaign for coronavirus disease 2019 (COVID-19) during the COVID-19 pandemic in Portugal.

The Government of Portugal appointed a task force on 18 November 2020 to develop the COVID-19 Vaccination Plan. The COVID-19 Vaccination Plan Task Force was formalised on 23 November 2020. It was led by Francisco Ramos, former Undersecretary of State and Health, and composed of military personnel, technicians from the Shared Services of the Ministry of Health (SPMS), the General Directorate of Health and Infarmed. In 30 days, on 18 December, the task force presented the plan, which divided the vaccination into three phases, according to the priority of the people to be vaccinated.

Approval of vaccines within the European Union is done by the European Medicines Agency (EMA), and the first COVID-19 vaccine, Tozinameran from Pfizer/BioNTech, was approved on 21 December 2020. In concert with other EU countries, Portugal began vaccination on 27 December, followed by vaccination of healthcare professionals directly in contact with COVID patients. The first Portuguese to be vaccinated was António Sarmento, director of the infectious diseases department at the Hospital de São João.

Portugal stands out internationally as one of the countries with the highest percentage of vaccinated population: with data as of 11 October 2021 88% of the country's total population has received the first dose. Portugal also has the highest level of COVID-19 vaccination within the European Union as of the end of September 2021.

== Vaccines on order ==
There are several COVID-19 vaccines at various stages of development around the world.

Vaccine	Approval	Deployment
Pfizer–BioNTech	21 December 2020	27 December 2020
Moderna	6 January 2021	12 January 2021
Oxford-AstraZeneca	29 January 2021	7 February 2021
Janssen	11 March 2021	Yes
Novavax	20 December 2021	Pending
Valneva	Pending	Pending
Sanofi–GSK	Pending	Pending
CureVac	Request withdrawn	No
