= Henrique Gouveia e Melo =

Portuguese naval officer (born 1960)

Admiral Henrique Gouveia e Melo GCC GCA
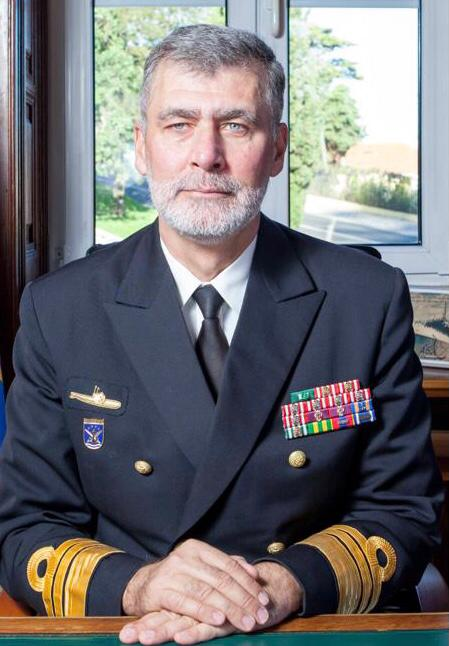
- Official portrait, 2021

Chief of the Naval Staff
- In office 27 December 2021 – 27 December 2024
- President: Marcelo Rebelo de Sousa
- Preceded by: António Mendes Calado
- Succeeded by: Jorge Nobre de Sousa

Coordinator of the COVID-19 Vaccination Plan Task Force
- In office 3 February 2021 – 28 September 2021
- Appointed by: João Gomes Cravinho (Minister of National Defence); Eduardo Cabrita (Minister of Internal Administration); Marta Temido (Minister of Health)
- Preceded by: Francisco Ramos
- Succeeded by: Office abolished

Commander of the European Maritime Force
- In office 19 September 2017 – 19 September 2019
- Preceded by: Donato Marzano
- Succeeded by: Jean-Philippe Rolland

Personal details
- Born: Henrique Eduardo Passaláqua de Gouveia e Melo; 21 November 1960 (age 66) Quelimane, Portuguese Mozambique, Portugal
- Citizenship: Portugal
- Party: Independent
- Spouse: Carol Costeloe (m. 1986; div. 2025)
- Domestic partner(s): Maria Cristina Castanheta (since 2019)
- Children: 2
- Education: Portuguese Naval School
- Awards: Military Order of Christ (2024)

Military service
- Allegiance: Portugal
- Branch/service: Portuguese Navy
- Years of service: 1979–2024 (active); 2024–present (reserve)
- Rank: Admiral

Admiral Henrique Eduardo Passaláqua de Gouveia e Melo (Portuguese: [ẽˈʁi.kɨ ɡo(w)ˈvɐj.ɐ i ˈmɛlu]; born 21 November 1960) is a retired Portuguese Navy officer. He mostly recently served as the Chief of the Naval Staff, from 2021 to 2024, and ran for President in the 2026 Portuguese presidential election as an independent.

Previously, while he was serving as Adjutant for Planning and Coordination of the Armed Forces General Staff, Gouveia e Melo rose to national prominence after being appointed coordinator of the Task Force for the successful national COVID-19 vaccination plan, that saw Portugal having the highest vaccination rates in the world. Gouveia e Melo had previously served as a Commander of the Portuguese Fleet (Comandante Naval) from 2017 to 2020 and, from 2017 to 2019, as Commander of the European Maritime Force (EUROMARFOR).

Due to his prominent role during the COVID-19 pandemic in Portugal, Gouveia e Melo was included in Jornal de Negócios's list of 50 Most Powerful People of 2021, which included both Portuguese and international personalities. His popularity made Gouveia e Melo be tipped by the media as a potential future presidential candidate. He officially announced his campaign for the 2026 Portuguese presidential election on 29 May 2025, but was ultimately unsuccessful.

== Early life and career ==
Henrique Gouveia e Melo was born in 1960 in Quelimane, Mozambique, which at the time was the Overseas Province of Mozambique, a territory under Portuguese rule. He was the son of Manuel Henriques Gomes de Frias de Melo e Gouveia, of a family of aristocratic roots in the Beira Interior region, and his wife Maria Helena Pereira Passaláqua, of Italian descent. Through his mother, he is a great-grandson of Viriato Zeferino Passaláqua (1850–1926), a brigade general, colonial administrator, and pioneer of the Spiritist movement in Portugal.

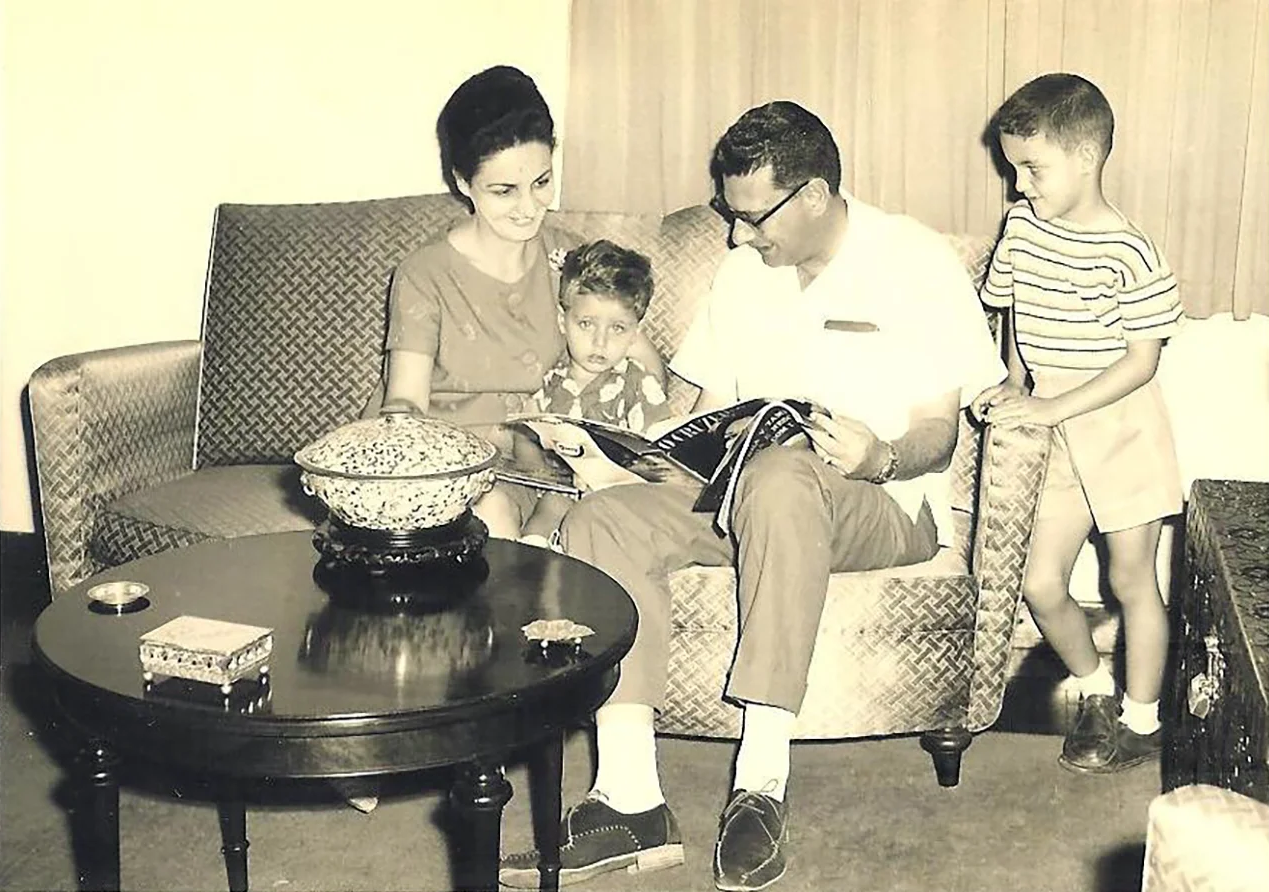
Gouveia e Melo as a child, with his parents and brother Manuel

He spent his youth between Quelimane and São Paulo in Brazil. As a young man, he earned the monicker "Marlon" — as in Marlon Brando — due to being sought after by the opposite sex. He finally went to Lisbon at age 18 to enroll at the Naval School as a cadet, in 1979. Each Naval School class is referred to by the name of an historical figure assigned to it as a patron; that year's was First World War hero Carvalho Araújo. In September 1984, at age 23, he finished his studies and was promoted to the rank of midshipman.

At age 24, in September 1985, he volunteered in the Submarine Escadrille (Esquadrilha de Submarinos) and sailed in the Albacora-class submarines NRP Albacora, NRP Barracuda, and NRP Delfim in several operational roles as a garrison officer and, later, in command positions as a chief officer aboard Albacora and Barracuda. During his long service in the Submarine Escadrille, which only ended in 2002, he also commanded the submarines Delfim and Barracuda, led the escadrille's Training and Assessment Service (Serviço de Treino e Avaliação) and the Staff of the National Submarine Operating Authority (Estado-Maior da Autoridade Nacional para o Controlo de Operações de Submarinos; SUBOPAUTH).

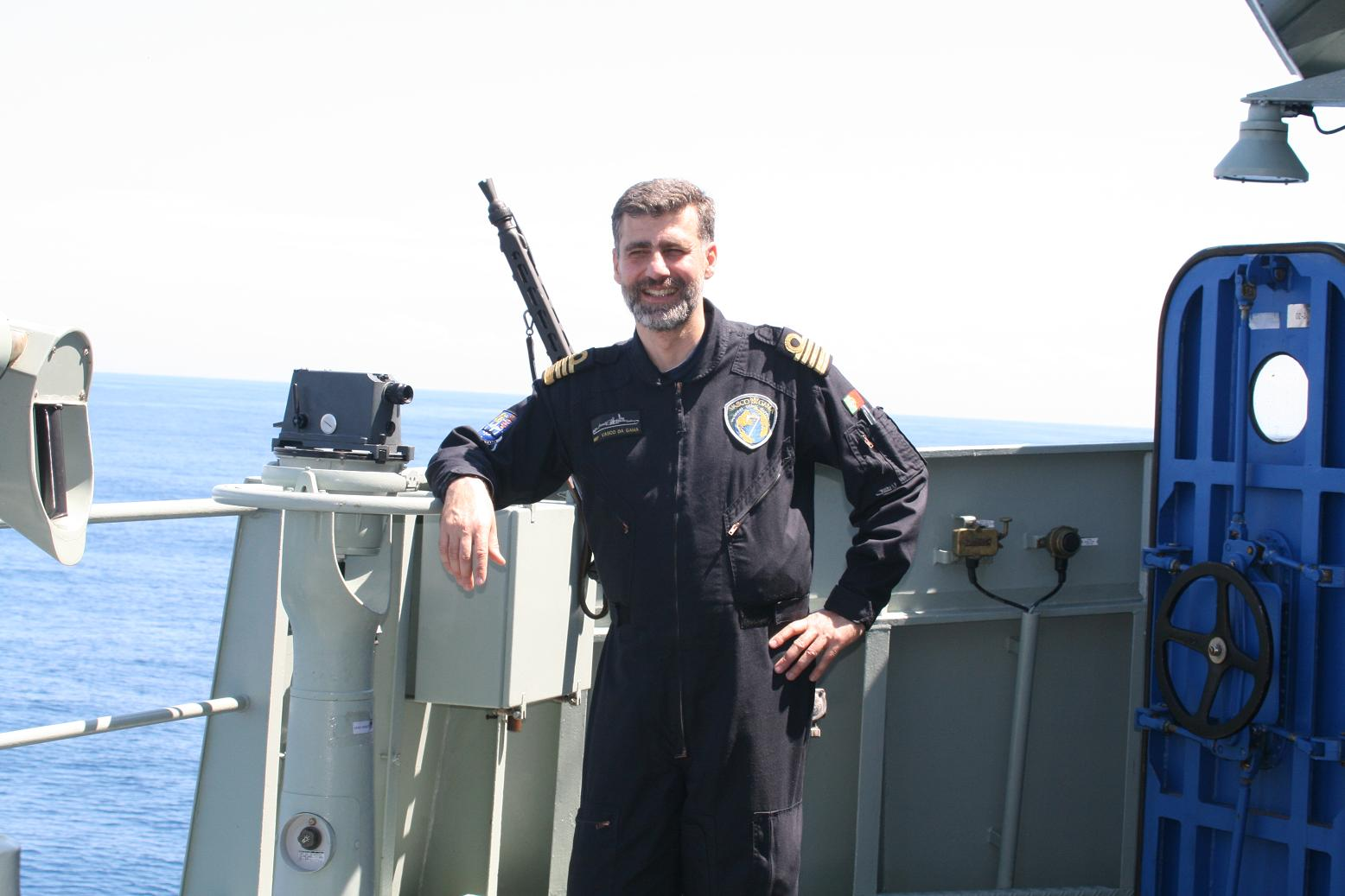
Gouveia e Melo as the commander of NRP Vasco da Gama, in 2008

After three years as a Navy Spokesman and having played a decisive role in the project for the acquisition of the new Tridente-class submarines, he commanded, from 2006 to 2008, the frigate NRP Vasco da Gama. He then returned to his activities as a submariner as the commander of the Submarine Escadrille, overseeing the necessary changes to adapt the military unit to the new submarines, namely, the sea trials and the commissioning of NRP Tridente. Before his promotion to general officer ranks, he served as the Second Commander of the Naval Fleet, Director of Lighthouses, and Director of the Sea Rescue Institute (Instituto de Socorros a Náufragos).

He was promoted to rear admiral in April 2014, after which he was appointed chief of staff to the Chief of the Naval Staff, until 2016, and then briefly served as the Second Commander of the Naval Fleet, leading it in an interim capacity. He was promoted to vice admiral in January 2017, after which he served as Commander of the Portuguese Fleet. At this time, he additionally served as Commander of the European Maritime Force (EUROMARFOR) until September 2019. From January 2020, he was named Adjutant for Planning and Coordination of the Armed Forces General Staff.

== COVID-19 pandemic ==
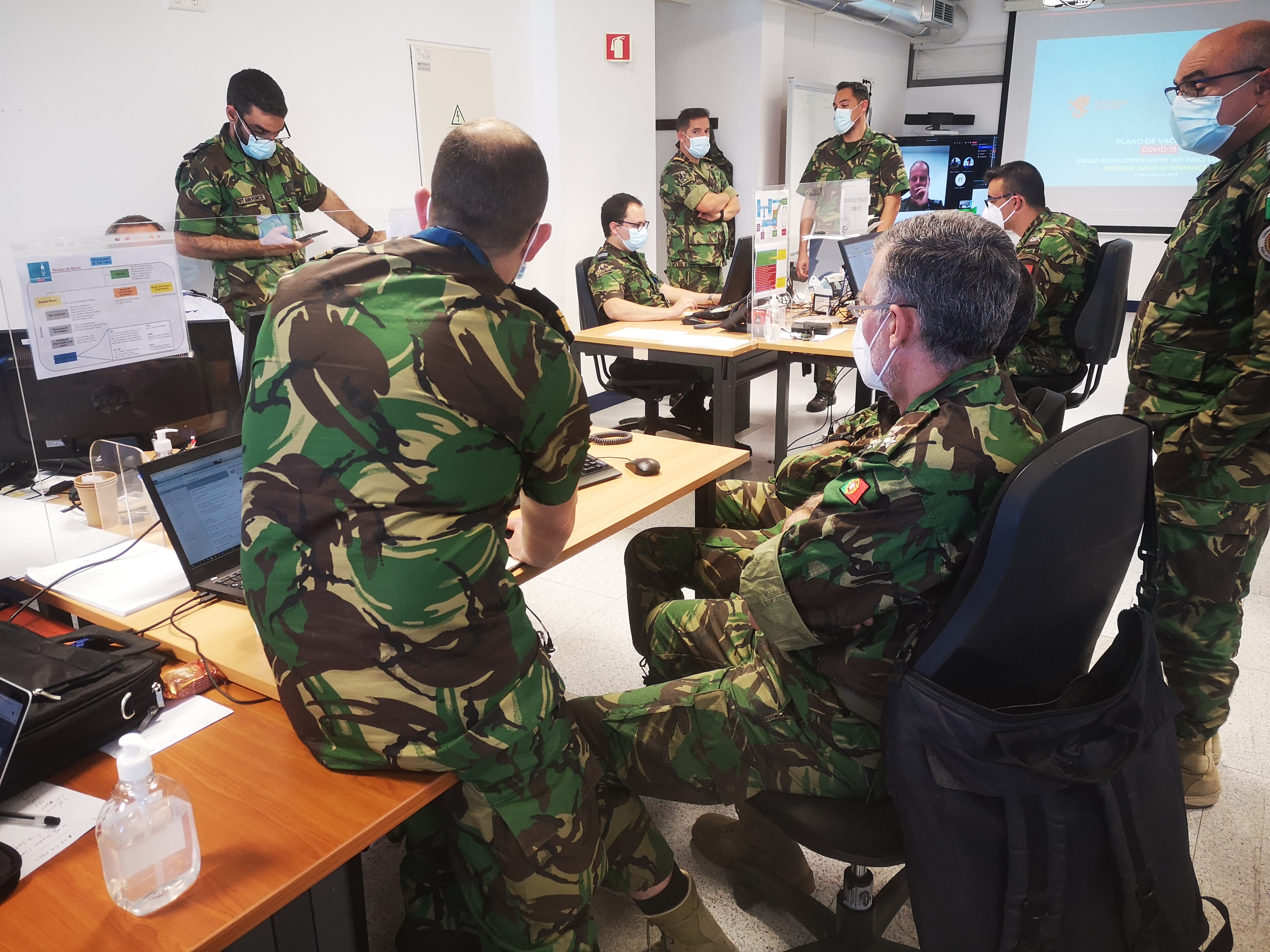
A meeting of the COVID-19 Vaccination Plan Task Force in 2021

Gouveia e Melo took on a high-profile role during the COVID-19 pandemic, following his appointment as Coordinator of the COVID-19 Vaccination Plan Task Force, the unit set up by the Portuguese government to assure the strategic planning and logistics for the national mass immunization campaign. Gouveia e Melo was appointed to head the task force on 3 February 2021, following the resignation of the first coordinator, former Secretary of State for Health Francisco Ramos, over a "queue jumping" scandal, in which people not belonging to priority groups allegedly were receiving their vaccines before their turn.

After being relatively spared during the first surge of the pandemic due to an internationally-praised timely and effective response, Portugal was at the time under a second national lockdown as it was being particularly severely hit by a second wave: the country had the highest seven-day average of new coronavirus cases per 100,000 inhabitants in the world, and the record numbers of new cases and hospital admissions threatened to overwhelm the struggling National Health Service.

Gouveia e Melo began to wear only his green combat uniform in public as well and used not only "the language of war" but military language in public outreach attempts. By October 2021, 98% of the eligible population and 86% of the total population was vaccinated against COVID-19. On 4 October 2021, shortly after the Vaccination Task Force disbanded, Gouveia e Melo was awarded the Golden Globe for Merit and Excellence in a ceremony in Coliseu dos Recreios. As he was presented with the award by Francisco Pinto Balsemão, former Prime Minister and Chairman of Grupo Impresa, he received a standing ovation, and on his speech thanked every Portuguese that had contributed to the success of the vaccination effort and voiced his intention of leaving the trophy at the Ministry of Health.

== Chief of the Naval Staff ==
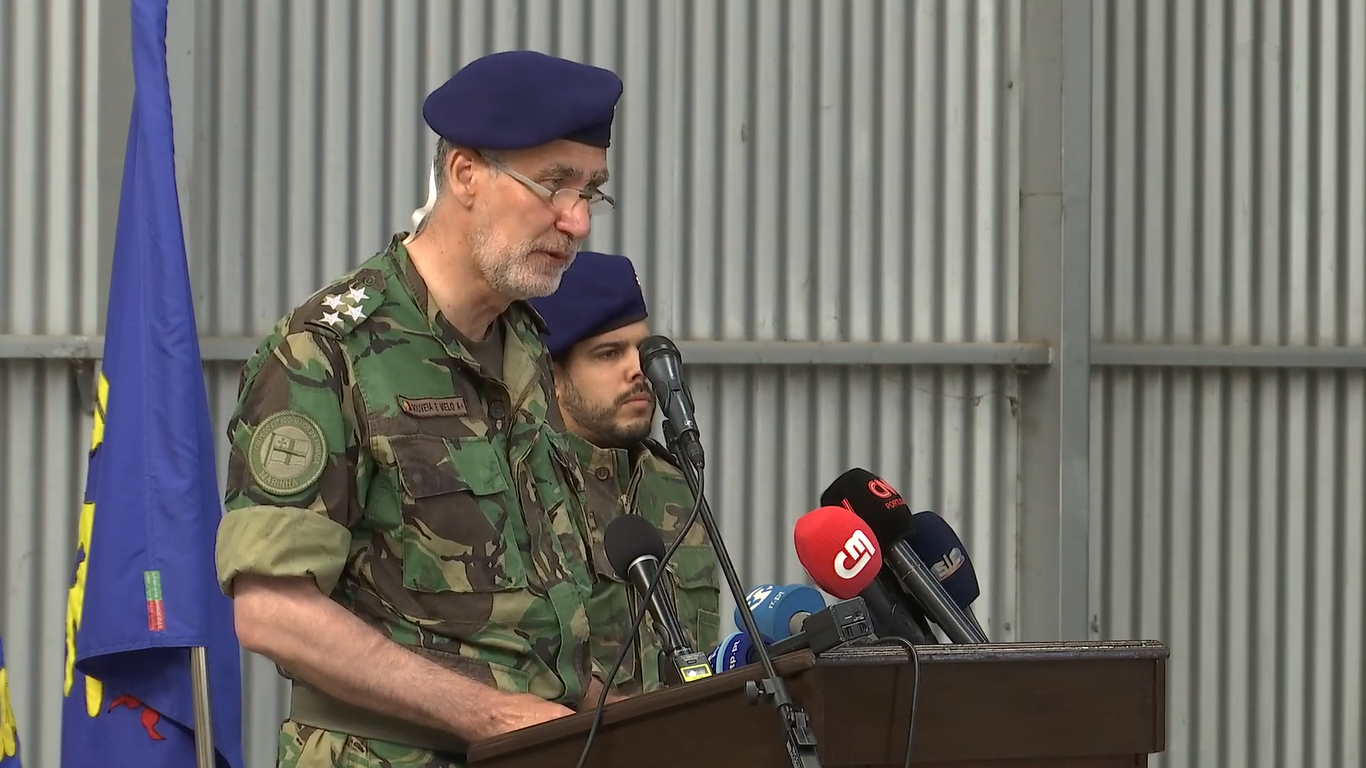
Admiral Gouveia e Melo, Chief of the Naval Staff, speaks to a force of Portuguese Marines before they are deployed to a NATO mission in Lithuania, on 1 June 2022.

Gouveia e Melo was appointed Chief of the Naval Staff and promoted to the rank of Admiral, on 27 December 2021. The appointment was not without controversy. His predecessor as Chief of the Naval Staff, Admiral António Mendes Calado, had been in office since 2018 and had in February 2021 been reappointed for a second term of no more than two years. Just as the COVID-19 Vaccination Task Force disbanded in September, the Minister of National Defence, João Gomes Cravinho, prematurely announced that the Government had petitioned the President of the Republic to dismiss Mendes Calado and to replace him with Gouveia e Melo.

Earlier that year, Mendes Calado had openly criticised and shown reservations over the Government's proposal to make significant changes to the National Defence Law (Lei de Defesa Nacional) and the Organic Basic Law of the Organisation of the Armed Forces (Lei Orgânica de Bases da Organização das Forças Armadas, LOBOFA) in parliamentary hearings, with the Admiral's dismissal being considered by some as retaliation; former Chief of the Naval Staff Admiral Fernando Melo Gomes called it a "political purge" (saneamento) that was reminiscent of the PREC. President Marcelo Rebelo de Sousa called the minister's announcement premature and a mistake, and did not dismiss Mendes Calado at the time. In December, the President announced that as the new National Defence laws with which Mendes Calado disagreed were about to be promulgated, the "new political cycle" made it now "the right moment" to replace the Chief of the Naval Staff. Mendes Calado publicly announced he was leaving his office "not of his own accord".

Gouveia e Melo was sworn in by the president on 27 December, in a short ceremony at Belém Palace, without any speeches, and with the noted absence of his predecessor, Admiral Mendes Calado. Just before the ceremony, he was awarded a Gold Military Medal for Distinguished Services by Admiral António da Silva Ribeiro, Chief of the General Staff of the Armed Forces.

=== NRP Mondego insubordination ===
On 11 March 2023, NRP Mondego, a Portuguese Navy patrol vessel specifically stationed to police Portugal's exclusive economic zone around Madeira, was tasked to track a Russian ship sailing in the vicinity, north of Porto Santo Island. The vessel failed to carry out the mission, after 13 personnel refused to board the ship claiming her to be unseaworthy. The Navy rejected the claim, and the sailors were relieved of their duties.

Gouveia e Melo personally went to Madeira where he publicly reprimanded the crew on the deck of NRP Mondego, on a speech underscoring the personnel's indiscipline and the damage caused to the image of the Navy and of the country; he went as far as comparing the insubordination to the mutiny on HMS Bounty. The Navy mounted an inquiry and initiated disciplinary proceedings that resulted in the insubordinates' suspension, which was overruled by decision of the South Administrative Central Court due to a series of procedural errors. The Navy unsuccessfully appealed the case to the Supreme Administrative Court; the seamen considered making demands to the Chief of the Naval Staff for financial compensation for "moral damages". In 2025, the Public Prosecution Service charged the personnel with the crime of "insubordination by disobedience" provided for in the Code of Military Justice.

== 2026 presidential campaign ==
2026 Henrique Gouveia e Melo presidential campaign
- Campaign: President of Portugal in the 2026 Portuguese presidential election
- Candidate: Henrique Gouveia e Melo, former Chief of the Naval Staff (2021–2024)
- Affiliation: Independent; People's Monarchist Party
- Status: Announcement: 14 May 2025; Campaign launch: 29 May 2025; Formalized candidacy: 10 December 2025; Defeat: 18 January 2026
- Key people: Rui Rio (campaign chair); Luís Bernardo (communication director)
- Slogan: O meu partido é Portugal (My party is Portugal)

Website
- gouveiamelopresidente.pt

Gouveia e Melo retired from active service on 27 December 2024, and was succeeded as Chief of the Naval Staff by Jorge Nobre de Sousa. That same day, President Marcelo Rebelo de Sousa granted him the Grand Cross of the Military Order of Christ. Gouveia e Melo officially announced his candidacy for the 2026 Portuguese presidential election during a public ceremony on 29 May 2025, held at the Alcântara Maritime Terminal.

At the time of the announcement, it was called "the worst-kept secret in national politics". Rumours of a possible presidential bid had been circulating since at least 2021, shortly after he had risen to national prominence as leading the COVID-19 Vaccination Plan Task Force with widely recognised effectiveness. Gouveia e Melo had initially denied the possibility: in October 2021 when asked to comment on a possible entrance into the world of politics during a lunch organised by the International Club of Portugal, he said "If that ever happens, hand me a rope to hang myself"; in 2023, in an interview for Renascença, he categorically denied any such intention.

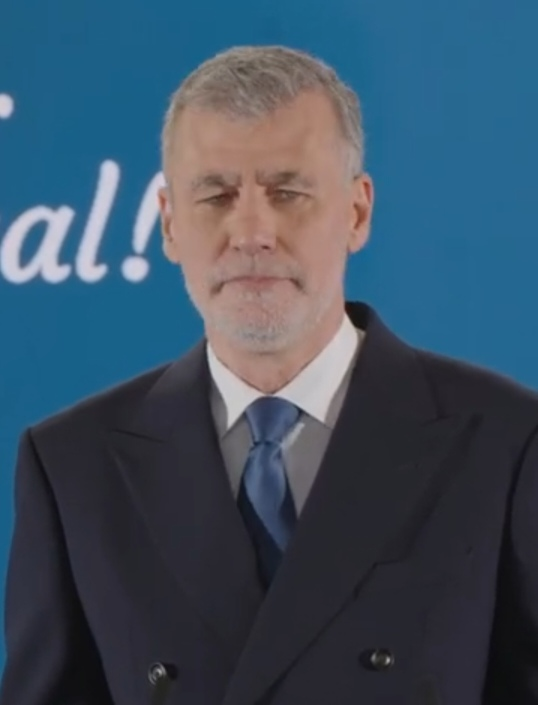
Gouveia e Melo during a campaign rally, in 2025

At the same time, some public statements were seen as hints to the contrary. In a December 2021 interview for Expresso, he described himself as being politically in "the pragmatic centre"; in August 2024, in an interview for Euronews, he called the idea that military personnel cannot participate in politics "antidemocratic"; by September 2024, in an interview for RTP3's "Grande Entrevista", he did not "include or exclude" the possibility of a presidential campaign. In February 2025, he wrote an article for Expresso titled "Honouring Democracy", in which he outlined his political profile, without commenting on a potential presidential bid. In it, he situated himself as "between socialism and social-democracy" (referring to the centre-left and centre-right major parties in Portugal) and defended liberal democracy.

Around the time of his announcement in mid-to-late 2025, Gouveia e Melo was leading many opinion polls. His candidacy was formalized after meeting the signature threshold on 10 December 2025. Gouveia e Melo received endorsements in the election including from Alberto João Jardim and Rui Rio, as well as the support of the People's Monarchist Party. He ultimately received 12.32% of the vote in the first round, finishing fourth. He conceded defeat after the announcement of the results, saying that there was the "need to depoliticize the Presidency of the Republic". He ultimately endorsed António José Seguro in the second round.

== Personal life ==
Henrique Gouveia e Melo married clinical psychologist Carol Costeloe in a Catholic ceremony in Parede, Cascais, on 22 March 1986; the two have two children, vascular surgeon Ryan Gouveia e Melo, and software engineer Eduardo Gouveia e Melo. They have been separated since 2019, but have only been formally divorced since 18 March 2025. After his separation, Gouveia e Melo has lived in a domestic partnership with diplomat Cristina Castanheta (b. 1965).

Gouveia e Melo does not smoke or drink as he "dislikes losing self-control", the only exception being when he rarely acedes to a toast. He supports the football team Benfica, having been from a young age an admirer of Eusébio who, like himself, hailed from Portuguese Mozambique.

== Distinctions ==
=== National orders ===
- Grand Cross of the Military Order of Christ (27 December 2024)
- Grand Cross of the Military Order of Aviz (19 August 2021)
- Commander of the Military Order of Aviz (3 June 2004)

=== National military decorations ===
- Military Medal for Distinguished Services, Gold (4)
- Military Medal for Distinguished Services, Silver (5)
- Medal for Military Merit, 1st Class
- Medal for Military Merit, 2nd Class
- Medal for Military Merit, 3rd Class
- National Defence Medal, 1st Class
- Medal of the Naval Cross, 3rd Class
- Exemplary Behaviour Medal, Gold

=== Foreign orders ===
- Officer of the Legion of Honour, France (11 November 2024)

=== Other distinctions ===
- Honoris causa doctorate, NOVA University of Lisbon (16 December 2021)
- Honoris causa specialist degree, Guarda Polytechnic Institute (30 September 2021)

== Electoral history ==
=== Presidential election, 2026 ===
Ballot: 18 January and 8 February 2026
Candidate	First round		Second round	
Candidate	Votes	%	Votes	%
António José Seguro	1,755,563	31.1	3,502,613	66.8
André Ventura	1,327,021	23.5	1,737,950	33.2
João Cotrim de Figueiredo	903,057	16.0		
Henrique Gouveia e Melo	695,377	12.3		
Luís Marques Mendes	637,442	11.3		
Catarina Martins	116,407	2.1		
António Filipe	92,644	1.6		
Manuel João Vieira	60,927	1.1		
Jorge Pinto	38,588	0.7		
André Pestana	10,897	0.2		
Humberto Correia	4,773	0.1		
Blank/Invalid ballots	125,840	–	275,414	–
Turnout	5,768,536	52.39	5,515,977	50.03
Source: Comissão Nacional de Eleições

Military offices
Preceded by Donato Marzano	Commander of the European Maritime Force; 2017–2019	Succeeded by Jean-Philippe Rolland
Preceded by António Mendes Calado	Chief of the Naval Staff; 2021–2024	Succeeded by Jorge Nobre de Sousa
