= Mediterranean Foundation of Strategic Studies =

Independent foundation

The Mediterranean Foundation of Strategic Studies (French: Fondation méditerranéenne d'études stratégiques, FMES) is an independent think tank founded in 1989 with the aim of fostering cooperation between Mediterranean countries and the development of South Mediterranean countries.

== Aims ==
The FMES takes actively part in strategic thinking concerning relations, both between France and the European Union and between the Euro-Mediterranean area and the Arab-Muslim world. The foundation is involved in the development of a Euro-Mediterranean partnership in the political and security fields, through studies, consulting, and courses cycles to administrations, territorial collectivities, municipalities and companies. It fosters links between actors from civilian life, collectivities and military world so as to allow a better understanding of security matters in the economic environment of the regions.

== History ==
The FMES was founded in Toulon (Var, France) in 1989 thanks to the growing awareness of its founding father, François Charollais, of the need to broadcast to public and private leaders working in the area better knowledge of strategic, political, economic and social issues in the Euro-Mediterranean world.

Quickly a couple of local and national actors were asked to be founding members of the FMES. Among them the Institut des hautes études de défense nationales (IHEDN), the Région Provence-Alpes-Côte d'Azur and the Var department, but also the Secrétariat général de la Défense et de la Sécurité nationale and the CHEAr (Centre des hautes études de l'armement). The Ambassador of France Francis Gutmann agreed to hold the presidency. Networks with Algerians, Moroccans and Tunisians strategic studies institutes were rapidly created.

In the same time the FMES developed, with the CHEAr, its first course cycle. These Mediterranean Sessions of armament's advanced studies are aiming at raising awareness of political, social, economic and strategic issues in the Mediterranean region and foster their participants to work together. Willing to spread the initiative to the Western Mediterranean, the FMES created with the European Union the association Strademed, (Stratégie Développement Méditerrannée), from Belgium law, with the same goal of fostering that European ability to work together, North and South. Sessions took place in Milan, Madrid and Algiers.

In the years following its creation the FMES gradually gained academic recognition thanks to its conferences, meetings and studies on Euro-Mediterranean geopolitics.

In June, 2000 Admiral Jacques Lanxade, former Army Chief of Staff and former French ambassador in Tunisia, succeeded to Francis Gutmann. The FMES gathered its action upon its Mediterranean Session which kept on welcoming every year about thirty participants, whereas the Strademed sessions were suspended. The Foundation mainly pursued its studying efforts in the defence and strategic affairs fields, especially for the French Ministry of Defence. The FMES also focused on its relations with the French Foreign Office and kept on holding workshops and conferences on themes of national and international concern. All of them are supported by a scientific council compound of several scholars and experts of the Arab world.

== Toward the creation of an institute of strategic and maritime studies ==
From the 2010s a new direction has slowly been taken by the FMES for its works. It had become obvious that maritime issues, specially those tackling security, were becoming more and more important for France and the European Union, mainly due to waxing globalization and international trade. These issues were worldwide but the FMES could not ignore this intensification in maritime communication as well as the soaring traffic in the Mediterranean area.

Besides, the growing chaos in Middle-East encouraged the FMES to shift its reflexions' gravity point from West to East, and South, with the inclusion of the Sahel region in the eye of the FME studies, following the involvement of French troops there.

The FMES therefore took a shift, both strategic and maritime. The latter implies the annual organization of a conference at the French Parliament. In 2013 this conference addressed challenges associated with the gas fields in the Eastern Mediterranean Sea; in 2014 it addressed maritime safety in the Gulf of Guinea.

== Publications ==
The FMES often publishes studies it has made and abstracts of conferences organized.
