= COVID-19 Vaccination Plan Task Force (Portugal) =

Formation patch of the Military Staff of the Task Force Coordinator (Estado-Maior do Coordenador da Task Force) worn by members of the task force

The COVID-19 Vaccination Plan Task Force (Portuguese: Task Force para a Elaboração do Plano de Vacinação contra a COVID-19 em Portugal) was a task force set up by the Portuguese government during the COVID-19 pandemic to ensure the strategic planning and logistics for Portugal's mass immunization campaign for the disease.

The task force was created on 23 November 2020 by joint order (despacho) of the Minister of National Defence, João Gomes Cravinho, the Minister of Internal Administration, Eduardo Cabrita, and the Minister of Health, Marta Temido.

It was initially led by Francisco Ramos, former Secretary of State for Health, until his resignation on 2 February 2021, over a "queue jumping" scandal, in which people not belonging to priority groups allegedly received their vaccines before their turn. Ramos was replaced the following day by vice-admiral Henrique de Gouveia e Melo, a naval officer who was already part of the task force.
