= Operation Active Endeavour =

Military operation

- Part of the Global War on Terrorism
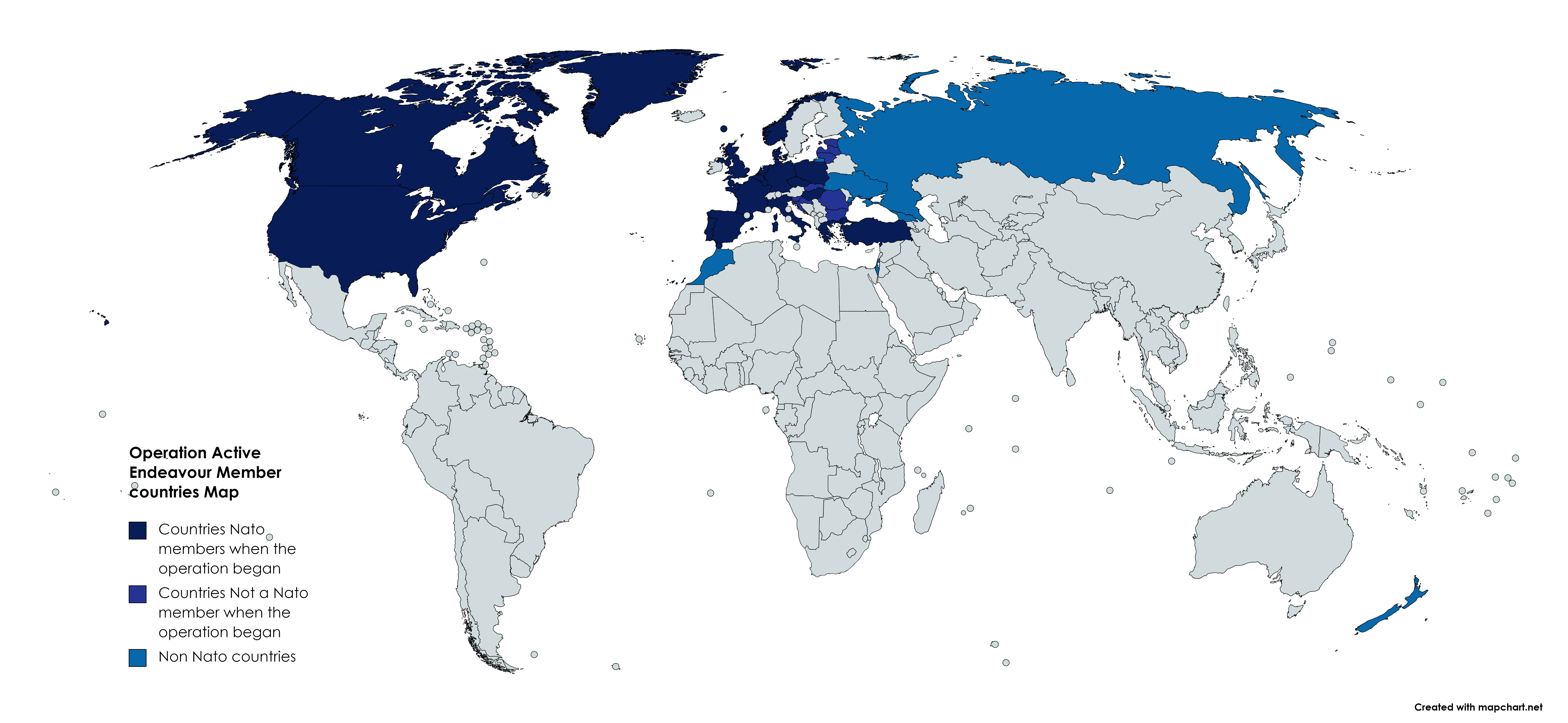
| Date | 4 October 2001 – 9 November 2016 (15 years, 1 month and 5 days) |
| Location | Mediterranean, Strait of Gibraltar |
| Result | Over 128,000 ships monitored (as of 2016); 172 ships boarded; 488 escorted ships (until May 2004); Indirect tightened control of black market trafficking lines in the Mediterranean; The rescue of civilians on various stricken oil rigs and sinking ships |

Belligerents
| NATO: Belgium; Canada; Czech Republic; Denmark; France; Germany; Greece; Hungary; Italy; Luxembourg; Netherlands; Norway; Poland; Portugal; Spain; Turkey; United Kingdom; United States; Bulgaria (from 2004); Estonia (from 2004); Latvia (from 2004); Lithuania (from 2004); Romania (from 2004); Slovakia (from 2004); Slovenia (from 2004); Albania (from 2009); Croatia (from 2009); Non-NATO: Georgia; Israel; Morocco; New Zealand; Russia (2006); Ukraine; Bulgaria (until 2004); Estonia (until 2004); Latvia (until 2004); Lithuania (until 2004); Romania (until 2004); Slovakia (until 2004); Slovenia (until 2004); Albania (until 2009); Croatia (until 2009) | Unspecified terrorist and smuggling groups |

Operation Active Endeavour was a maritime operation of the North Atlantic Treaty Organization. It operated in the Mediterranean Sea and was designed to prevent the movement of terrorists or weapons of mass destruction. It had collateral benefits in enhanced security of shipping in general. It was one of the first military actions taken by NATO in response to an invocation of Article 5 of the North Atlantic Treaty which provides for collective defense and the first-ever operation conducted by the Alliance in direct application of the defense clause of the Treaty. In November 2016 it was replaced by the non-Article-5 Operation Sea Guardian.

== History ==
The operation began on 4 October 2001 as one of the eight NATO responses to the 11 September attacks, although it did not formally begin until 16 October. The naval assets of Standing Naval Force Mediterranean (STANAVFORMED), which were participating in Exercise Destined Glory 2001 off the southern coast of Spain, were reassigned in order to provide an immediate NATO military presence in the Eastern Mediterranean. Prior to its cessation, the operation was conducted by a number of NATO military assets, including the Standing NATO Maritime Group 1 (SNMG1) and Standing NATO Maritime Group 2 (SNMG2).

On 4 February 2003, the North Atlantic Council (NAC) decided to extend Operation Active Endeavour to include escorting non-military ships traveling through the Strait of Gibraltar to maintain security in the area and to secure the safe transit of designated Allied ships.

On 29 April 2003, Task Force Endeavour began boarding operations following a NAC decision to enhance the effectiveness of the current naval operation against suspected terrorist activities in the Mediterranean. The boarding operations were conducted in accordance with the rules of international law and were of a compliant nature. Over 160 vessels had been boarded as of 1 June 2010.

Several submarines of the Royal Norwegian Navy Ula class have been deployed in the Mediterranean Sea in support of the NATO Operation Active Endeavour, where their intelligence-gathering abilities have surpassed expectations. Their operational availability proved to be the highest of all the ships taking part in the operation.

On 15 September 2006, NATO authorized the Russian ship Pytliviy to participate in Operation Active Endeavour.

Since its inception, the ships of Active Endeavour have monitored over 100,000 vessels (as of June 2010) and conducted voluntary boardings of over 100. They have also escorted over 480 vessels through the Strait of Gibraltar until escorting was suspended in 2004.

On 4 December 2001, STANAVFORMED ships Aliseo, Formion, and Elrod were called to assist in the rescue of 84 civilians from a stricken oil rig. In high winds and heavy seas, the Italian helicopter of the Aliseo removed all 84 workers from the oil rig in 14 flights.

On 2 January 2002, SNFL's Spanish frigate Extremadura and Netherlands oiler HNLMS Amsterdam, the UK naval vessel HMS Beagle and the Greek Coast Guard provided life-saving support to the passengers of a sinking ship in the Eastern Mediterranean off Crete. The Beagle's crew repaired the leaking hull and damaged propulsion to the Aydin Kaptan before the weather deteriorated and Greek helicopters began winching the children and women amongst the 254 refugees on board and carried them to Crete and the Amsterdam. On 3 January 2002, the Aydin Kaptan was towed by a Greek fishing vessel, under SNFL escort, to Greek territorial waters.

While conducting counter-terrorist operations in the Mediterranean Sea, ships assigned to Operation Active Endeavor have also assisted the Greek government with the prevention of illegal immigration. On 23 March 2006, NATO forces alerted the Hellenic Coast Guard to a vessel named MV Crystal. The coast guard units intercepted the ship and arrested the captain and crew who were attempting to smuggle 126 illegal immigrants.

In an interview with Rear Admiral Richard Leaman OBE, Chief of Staff of the Allied Maritime Component Command – Naples in June 2006, Jane's Navy International was told that the number of frigates involved in the operation had been systematically pared back, with now only three permanent frigates patrolling the Mediterranean, two standby corvettes from Greece and Turkey, and a small submarine force. However, during surge operations the number apparently can rise to 16 ships with forces from Standing NATO Maritime Groups 1 and 2.

Other Mediterranean Dialogue countries expressed interest in collaborating in OAE. An EOL with Morocco was completed on 2 June 2008. It was followed, on 22 October 2009, by a Tactical Memorandum of Understanding defining the modalities of Morocco's participation in the operation.

An EOL with Georgia was completed on 26 March 2008. The related TMOU was signed on 28 April 2010.

Building on the experience achieved over the years, the operation is now network-based and no longer relies on permanently assigned units. However, it continues to conduct "surge" operations and remains prepared to carry out at-sea inspections. New technologies, exploitation of developments in surveillance and information sharing capabilities, closer cooperation and information sharing with Mediterranean Dialogue (MD) and Partnership for Peace (PfP) countries have enabled a start to the transition from platform-based to network-based operation. A combination of surge operations and standby units will replace permanently deployed forces. Information exchange between NATO and non-NATO contributing nations, law enforcement agencies, international organisations and non-governmental organisations will be enhanced.

HMCS Vancouver deployed on Op Sirius, the Canadian contribution, in November 2011 as it is follow on mission to Operation Unified Protector.

Operation Active Endeavour changed command from Joint Forces Command (JFC), Naples, to Maritime Command Headquarters (HQ MARCOM), Northwood, United Kingdom in February 2013.

At the Warsaw Summit in July 2016, NATO leaders agreed to transition Operation Active Endeavour to a non-Article 5 maritime security operation, to be called Operation Sea Guardian. Operation Sea Guardian was formally launched on 9 November 2016, marking the end of Active Endeavour. It has a wider remit, including maritime situational awareness, freedom of navigation, maritime interdiction, countering the proliferation of weapons of mass destruction, protecting critical infrastructure, countering terrorism at sea and maritime security capacity-building.
