= Jean-Philippe Rolland =

Chief of the Military Staff of the President of the Republic
- Incumbent
- Assumed office 1 August 2020
- Preceded by: Bernard Rogel

Commander of European Maritime Force
- Incumbent
- Assumed office 19 September 2019
- Preceded by: Henrique Gouveia e Melo

Personal details
- Born: 7 May 1964 (age 61) Toulon, France

Military service
- Allegiance: France
- Branch/service: French Navy
- Years of service: 1983
- Rank: Admiral

Jean-Philippe Rolland is an admiral of the French Armed Forces, he was Commander of the Naval Action Force since August 31, 2017, and concurrent Chief of the Military Staff of the President of the Republic.

Jean-Philippe Rolland, an admiral of the Navy is also serving as the command of European Maritime Force since 19 September 2019, born May 7, 1964, in Toulon, France, he was enrolled into Naval School In 1983 through which after passing out in the training course of the helicopter carrier French cruiser Jeanne d'Arc (R97), he was assign to Light Transport Building of Dumont d'Urville Polynesia and of which he later was moved to L'Estafette Polynesia the Marquises Archipelago, although he specified in defense weapons systems even before he was in the frigate Jean Bart, he had Commands the FS Panthère training school ship in 1988 and the La Fayette, he participate in the Persian Gulf during the operation of the protection of maritime traffic in 1989, although in 1988 he led the surveillance missions in the Mediterranean onboard of the frigate Duguay-Trouin.

He took part in the operations of one was the former Yugoslavia crisis that was in 1994 before becoming the Aviso Commandant Bouan, he moved on to Joint Defense College 1999 for a year then of which he continues serving in the National Navy Staff in Paris as program officer. The frigate La Fayette was in his command in 2005 of which he led during the part of Operation Enduring Freedom in Indian Ocean to support mission in Afghanistan.

He partakes in the reforms of the anti-aircraft and the naval cruise missile, he was operations manager of the aircraft carrier Charles de Gaulle ship in 2003 and in commands of in 2009, and together as the Planning-Programming of the National Navy staff, HQ was in 2007, he was also part of support mission in Afghanistan and of the Libyan coasts military protection, and also participated in the 2008 and 2013 Military Planning Law.

== Other military schools ==
He also attended the French Naval War College, the Nuclear Engineering School and Center for Advanced Military Studies in 2008, he also attended the Institute for Higher National Defense Studies and served in the surface fleets on operational preparation.

== Commands and ranks ==
He was the Cabinet of the Chief of Staff of the French Navy under the office of the chief of staff before rosing up to become the Deputy Chief of Force Employment under the Defense Staff was in 2013 and got promoted to rear admiral in May 2014, under the Joint Staff, he was the head of Capability Coherence Division before a promotion to vice admiral (Vice-Amiral d’Escadre) and commands the Naval Action Force in 2017.

== Decorations ==
- Officer of the Legion of Honor (July 2012)
- Commander of the National Order of the Legion
- Honour and Commander of the National Order of Merit.

Military offices
Preceded by Henrique de Gouveia e Melo	Commander of European Maritime Force; 2019-present	Incumbent
Preceded by Bernard Rogel	Chief of the Military Staff of the President of the Republic; 2020–present	Incumbent
Unknown	Naval Action Force; 2017–2021	Unknown
