= Chief of the Military Staff of the President of the Republic =

The Chief of the Military Staff of the President of the Republic (French: Chef d'état-major particulier du président de la République) is a role in the military and government of France, heading the president's military staff until the present Fifth Republic.

== Heads of the president's military household (1879–1940) ==
The president's 'military household' (maison militaire) was formed by president Mac-Mahon but not institutionalised until 1880. This group of officers advised the president on army matters, especially (under the French Third Republic) matters of ceremony. Such an allocation was useful since it allowed its officers to nourish political contacts in Paris who could aid their army careers.

- 1879–1886: général de division François Pittié
- 1886–1892: général de brigade, then de division Henri Brugère
- 1892–1894: général de brigade, then de division Léon Borius
- 1894–1895: général de brigade Ulysse Berruyer
- 1895–1897: général de brigade Charles Tournier
- 1897–1898: général de brigade Alexis Hagron
- 1898–1900: général de brigade Maurice Bailloud
- 1900–1906: général de brigade, then de division Émile Dubois
- 1906–1907: colonel Charles Ebener
- 1908–1911: capitaine de vaisseau Alexandre Laugier
- 1911–1913: capitaine de vaisseau Marcel Grandclément
- 1913–1914: général de division Antoine Beaudemoulin
- 1919–1920: général de division Jean-Baptiste Pénelon
- 1920–1924: général de division Henri Lasson
- 1931–1940: général de corps d'armée Joseph Braconnier

== President's chief of the military staff ==
The 'chef d'état-major particulier' (CEMP) is the chief military adviser to the French president. The president serves as commander-in-chief of the French armed forces. As interface between the military and the president, the CEMP plays a vital role in putting into practice nuclear deterrence. The CEMP usually goes on to become chef d'état-major des armées.

- général de division Henri Grout de Beaufort: January 1959 – 1960
- général de corps d'armée Jean Olié: 1960 – 1961
- général Louis Dodelier: 1961 – 1962
- général de brigade aérienne Gabriel Gauthier: 1962 – 1964
- vice-amiral Jean Philippon: 1964 – 1967
- général de division André Lalande: 1967 – 1969
- général Jean Deguil: 1969 – 1971
- général d'armée Michel Thénoz: 1972 – 1974
- général d'armée Guy Méry: June 1974 – July 1975
- général d'armée Claude Vanbremeersch: July 1975 – 1979
- général Bertrand de Montaüdouin: 1979 – 1981
- général d'armée aérienne Jean-Michel Saulnier: 1981 – 1985
- général Gilbert Forray: 1985 – July 1987
- général Jean Fleury: 31 July 1987 – April 1989
- amiral Jacques Lanxade: April 1989 – 23 April 1991
- général de division Christian Quesnot: 24 April 1991 – 7 September 1995
- vice-amiral Jean-Luc Delaunay: 8 September 1995 – 29 April 1999
- général de division Henri Bentégeat: 30 April 1999 – 24 October 2002
- général d'armée Jean-Louis Georgelin: 25 October 2002 – 3 October 2006
- vice-amiral d'escadre Édouard Guillaud: 4 October 2006 – 24 February 2010
- général de corps d'armée Benoît Puga: 5 March 2010 – 6 July 2016
- amiral Bernard Rogel: 13 July 2016 – 1 August 2020
- amiral Jean-Philippe Rolland: 1 August 2020 – 30 April 2023
- général d'armée aérienne Fabien Mandon: 1 May 2023 – 31 August 2025
- général d'armée Vincent Giraud: since 1 September 2025
