= Maritime security operations =

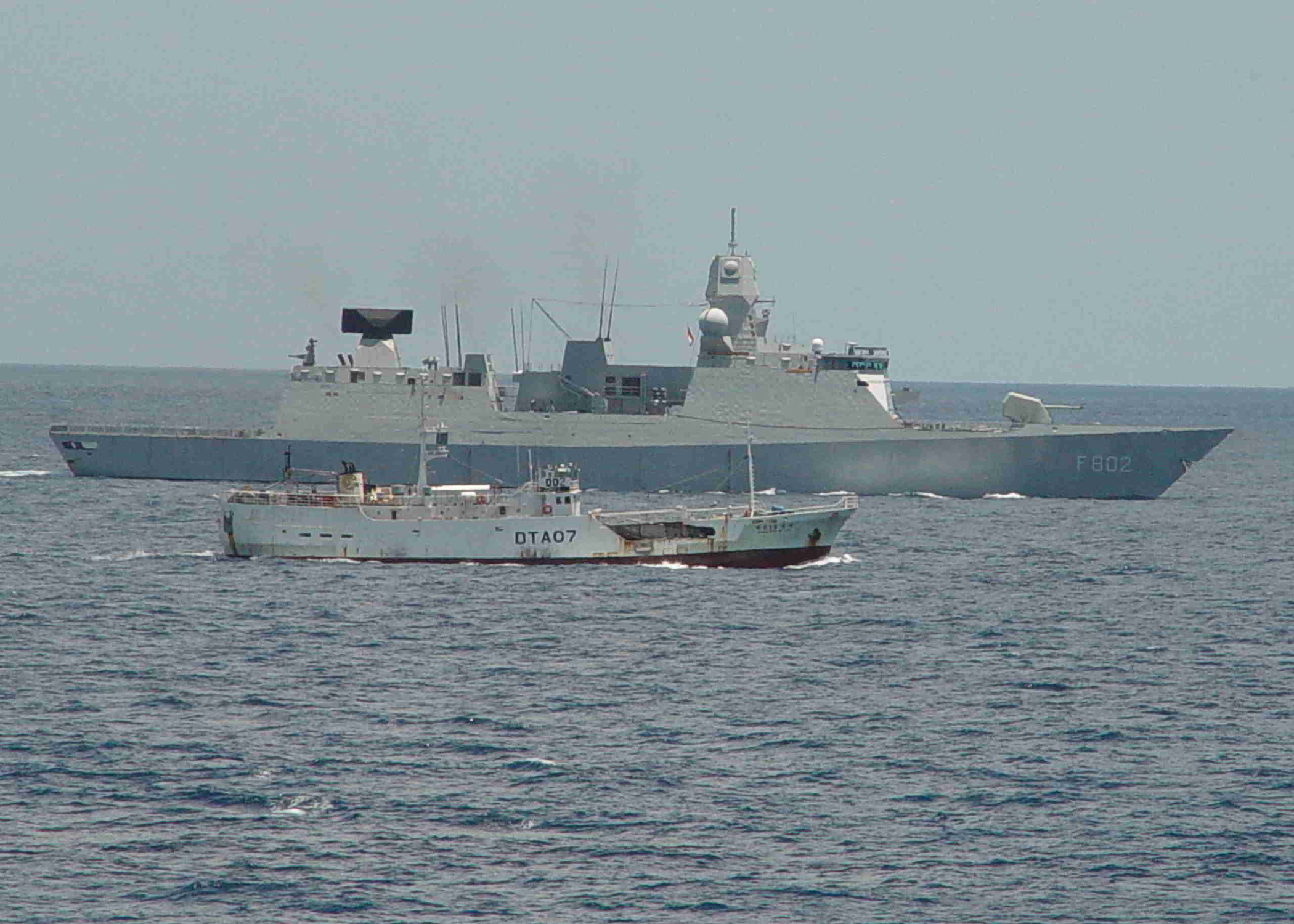
The Dutch ship HNLMS De Zeven Provinciën (F802) responding to the South Korean-flagged fishing vessel Dong Won (628) in the Indian Ocean, April 4, 2006

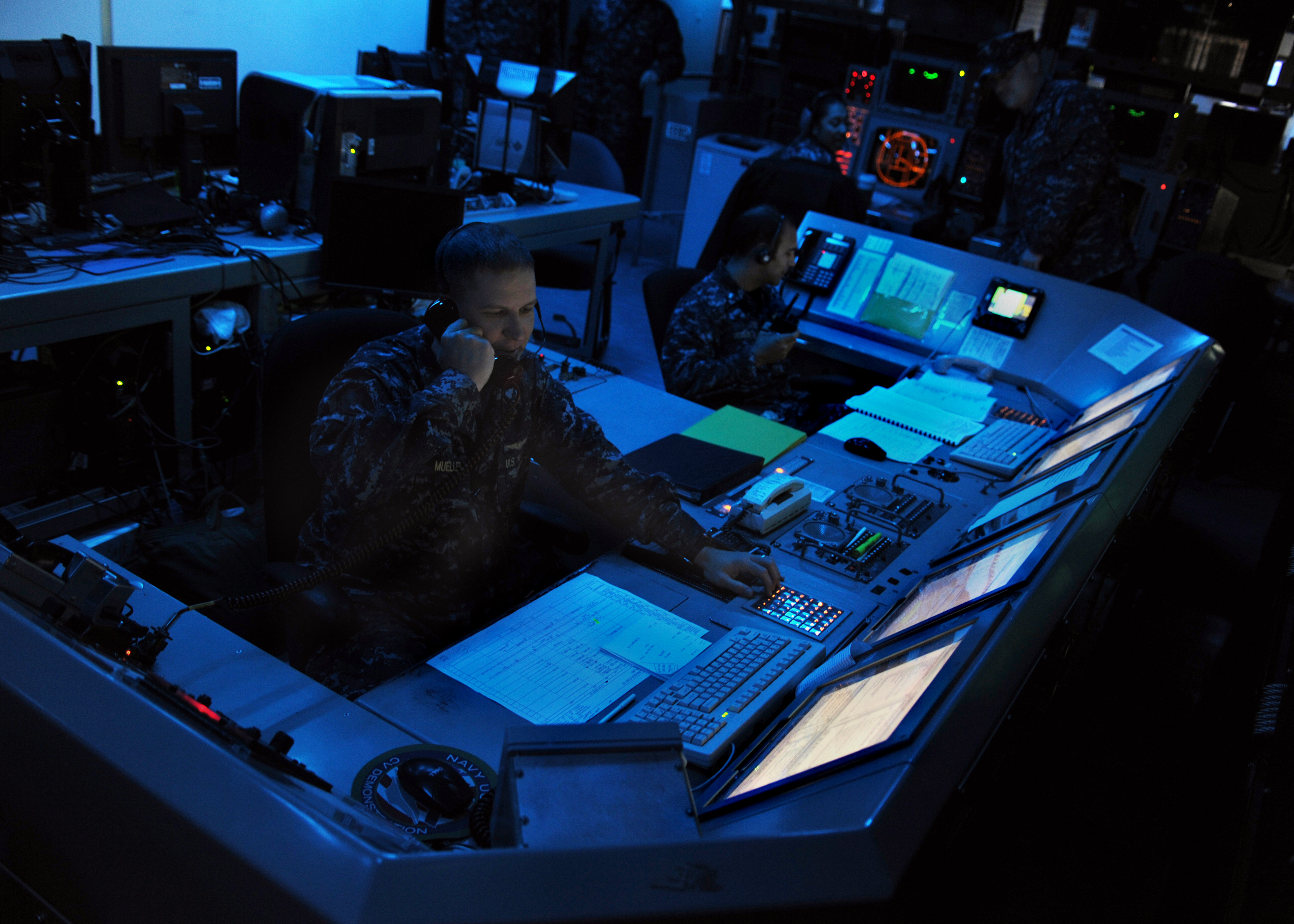
US Navy officers aboard the aircraft carrier USS Abraham Lincoln (CVN-72) monitor defense systems during maritime security operations.

Maritime security operations (MSO) are the actions of modern naval forces to "combat sea-based terrorism and other illegal activities, such as hijacking, piracy, and slavery, also known as human trafficking." Ships assigned to such operations may also assist seafaring vessels in distress. These activities are part of an overall category of activities which fall short of open warfare called military operations other than war (MOOTW). MSO also involve the marine environmental protection, creating a safer and clean environment.

The United States Coast Guard, along with several other agencies such as Navy, Maritime Administration, the Department of Transportation, the Environmental Protection Agency, and the Federal Maritime Commission are American agencies that have a role in the regulation of U.S. ports. Their mission is to create a safer and reliable international ocean transportation system, to protect the public from any unfair and deceiving practice.

A primary component of MSO requires inspections and, at times, forced boardings of vessels at sea. These actions are called visit, board, search, and seizure (VBSS). Also arrests and VBSS of ships which may have been sighted (via lookouts) from a distance to be underway and not responding to communications made to her or may have some form of smaller attached crafts which may be seen to be used as other means to attack larger crafts.

== Who ==
Maritime Security Operations are conducted by many international navies, coastguards and border forces.

In the United States there are two major naval forces that conduct such operations; the United States Coast Guard and the United States Navy. Although they both have very distinct jobs from one another, one of their major jobs is to be able to provide security operations.

The U.S. Coast Guard is a branch of the United States Armed Forces, they have eleven official missions. Their role is to provide port & waterway security, drug interdiction, search and rescue, marine environment protection, ICE operations, aids to navigation, living marine recourses, marine safety, defense readiness, law enforcement and migrant interdiction along with several other missions. Overall, their role is to provide a safer maritime industry.

Along with the U.S. Coast Guard, the U.S. Navy is also another branch of the United States Armed Forces. Unlike the Coast Guard, the Navy is a projection of force in areas beyond the U.S. shores. Their operations go beyond the shores; they provide aid to military out on the sea, carry troops to other countries, strategic plans for attacks and protect the sea lanes.

== Operations ==
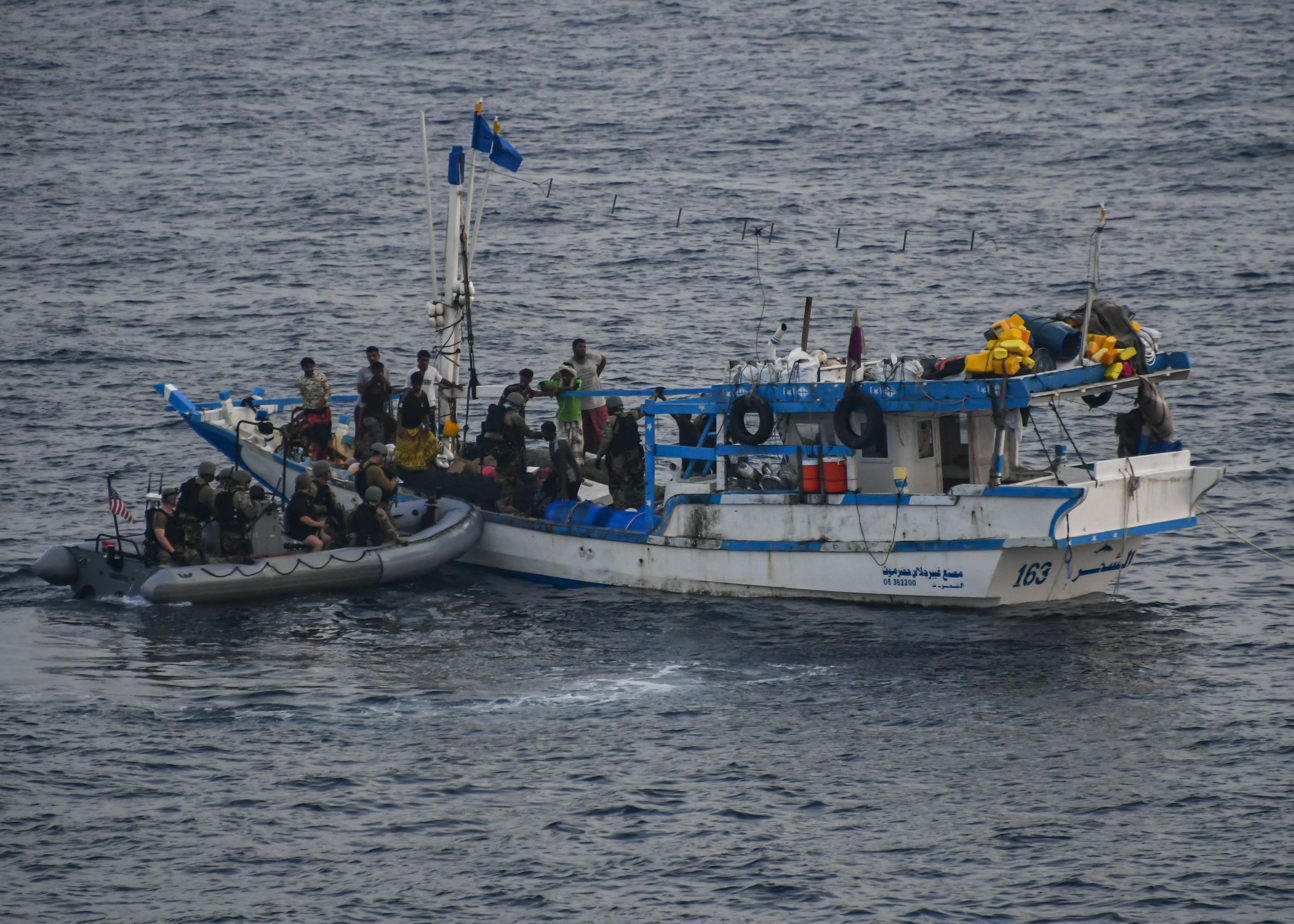
Sailors from the USS Normandy conduct visit, board, search, and seizure operations in the Gulf of Aden in 2019

Today's modern naval force have been able to detect, strategize, and prevent dozens of several illegal activities. Piracy, being one of the most known crimes in the maritime industry has not been able to control its activities. Piracy was known to have a great presence during the early 1500s, up to this day the number of piracy activity is still significantly large. From the beginning of the twentieth century, the number of piracy attack have been found to be cyclical in nature, taking its high points in 2003 and 2010. In spite of this high point, several organization against anti-piracy such as the Northern Atlantic Treaty Organization (NATO) have been able to disrupt pirates attacks protecting vessel and their crew member along with their cargo. As a safety measure, the U.S. Coast Guard encourage the ships' captain to know his crew, deliver a detailed plan of his sea trip to a trusted friend, final check before departing, notify Coast Guard of any suspicious activity, and finally consider clearing local customs before departing on a foreign cruise. Taking these protective measures will lessen the possibility of piracy or high jacking.

A significant amount of contraband such as drugs has entered many ports through vessels claiming to be caring different types of cargo. Drug Interdiction is one of the eleven Coast Guard official missions, they aim to prevent drug traffic by intersecting drug carrying vessels out at sea. Mariners aboard a vessel that have information that a ship is involved in narcotics trafficking are required to contact their nearest Coast Guard unit. Several cargo ships have been contained with thousands of kilos on board. In the mid-year of 2015, the USS Gary (FFG 51) marked its tenth successful interdiction since October 2014. Joining forces with the U.S. Coast Guard and the Canadian Navy they contained 11,700 kilograms of cocaine off the coast of Central America. While conducting a regular patrol the USS Gary tailed and located a small coastal freighter. After observing the crew discarding suspicious contraband overboard Gary launched a small boat to recover the suspected contraband.

Slavery, also known as human trafficking in modern days, is the act of forcing some type of labor or sexual act upon someone. As the years go by the number of men, women, and children being trafficking are significantly large, this is happening around the world including the United States. Human trafficking comes second to drug trafficking generating billions of dollars per year. This crime is hard to follow up due to the victim's language and fear to the traffickers and law enforcement. The Department of the Navy (DoN) and the Department of Defense (DoD) along with other offices have come together to fight and ensure that the Combating Trafficking in the Persons (CTIP) policies are properly implemented and integrated. In the month of January 2017, the SDPD was able to arrest 38 men involved with human trafficking during an undercover operation. Even though the Coast Guard and the Navy were not involved in this operation, they also have operations similar to drug trafficking.

Search and rescue missions is also considered a maritime security operation, it is one of the oldest Coast Guard missions. As the leader in the field of search and rescue missions, worldwide, to do so the coast guard keeps facilities on the East, West, and Gulf coasts. When a search and rescue(SAR) mission is being conducted, it involves cutter, aircraft, and boats. Their goal is to minimize the loss of life and injuries, to provide aid to those in need of it. Using the coordinates of the vessel in need gives the Coast Guard and an idea of where to look for. These coordinates are given by a device called a "Black Box".

An example of such operations is the involvement of the multinational coalition Combined Task Force 150, which performs Maritime Security Operations in the Indian Ocean and Persian Gulf. During the Somali Civil War, they provided anti-piracy operations along the coast of Somalia in international waters. During the 2006–2007 war, they performed a cordon along the coast to prevent the escape of Al-Qaeda operatives by sea.
