= Ordre du Mérite Maritime =

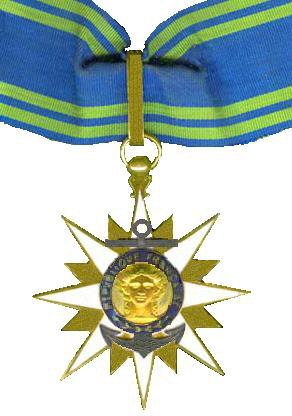
- Type: Order of merit with 3 degrees: Commandeur (commander); Officier (officer); Chevalier (knight)
- Awarded for: Distinguished service of professional sailors and the merit of civilian mariners
- Presented by: France
- Status: Active
- Established: 1930
- Commandeur Officier Chevalier Ribbon bars of the l'Ordre du Mérite Maritime

Precedence
- Next (higher): Order of Agricultural Merit
- Next (lower): Ordre des Arts et des Lettres

The Ordre du Mérite Maritime (French for 'Order of Maritime Merit') is a French order established on 9 February 1930 for services rendered by seafarers to recognise the risks involved and the services rendered by seamen, and reflect the important economic role of the Merchant Navy to the country. The order was reorganized in 1948, and again by decree on 17 January 2002.

== Categories ==
The order may be conferred on those who have rendered services to shipping, and covers:

- Merchant marine crew, civilian administrators, and the crews of lifeboats and rescues
- Naval military personnel.
- Individuals who have distinguished themselves in the maritime field.

Recipients must be over thirty and have at least fifteen years appropriate service.

The order has three classes:

- Chevalier (Knight): badge worn on the left chest on a ribbon.
- Officier (Officer): badge worn on the left chest on a ribbon bearing a rosette.
- Commandeur (Commander): badge worn around the neck.

There is also a Médaille d'Honneur des Marins (Sailors' Medal of Honour) associated with the Order.
