= Ministry of Armed Forces (France) =

Government ministry of France

- French: Ministère des Armées
- Official logotype

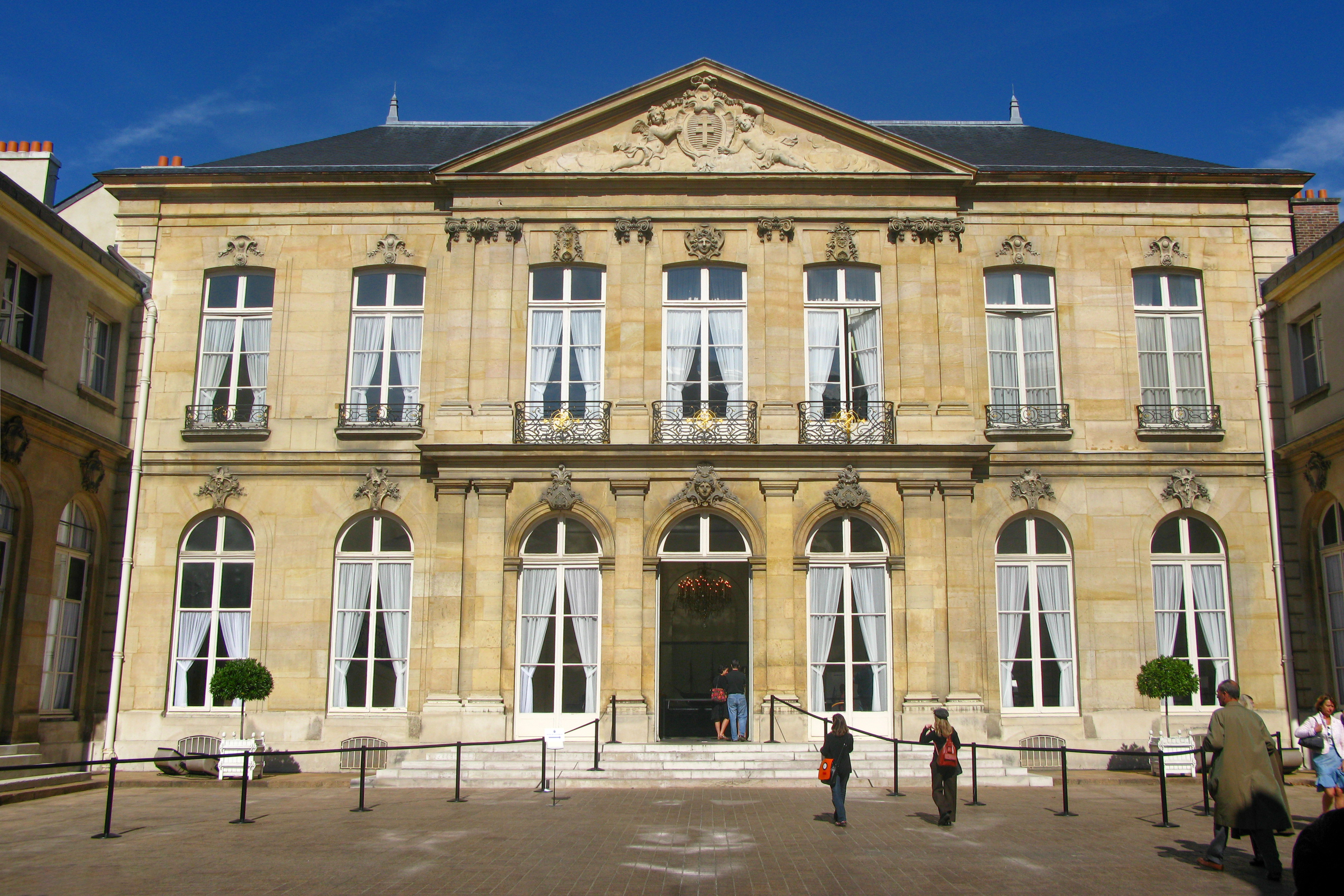
- Ministry of Armed Forces HQ

Ministry overview
- Formed: 31 October 1947; 78 years ago
- Preceding agencies: Ministry of War; Ministry of the Navy; Ministry of the Air
- Jurisdiction: Government of France
- Headquarters: Hôtel de Brienne; Paris 7e, French Republic: Hexagone Balard; Paris 15e, French Republic; 48°51′35″N 2°19′10″E; 48°50′8″N 2°16′34″E
- Annual budget: €54.494 billion
- Ministers responsible: Catherine Vautrin; Minister of the Armed Forces
- Ministry executive: Fabien Mandon, Chief of the Defence Staff
- Website: www.defense.gouv.fr

The Ministry of Armed Forces (French: Ministère des Armées, pronounced [ministɛʁ dez‿aʁme], lit. 'Ministry of the Armies') is the ministry of the Government of France in charge of managing the French Armed Forces inside and outside French territory. Its head is the Minister of the Armed Forces. From 1947 until 2017, the Ministry was designated the Ministry of Defence (French: Ministère de la Défense). It is France's ministry of defence.

== Organisation ==
=== Minister of the Armed Forces ===
The head of the department is the Minister of the Armed Forces. The current officeholder has been Sébastien Lecornu since 2022. He reports directly to the President of the Republic, the Commander-in-Chief of the French Armed Forces.

His mission is to organize and manage the country's Defence Policy in liaison with other departments. He is also in charge of mobilizing troops and managing the military infrastructure. He is responsible for the French Armed forces' security to Parliament.

=== Chief of the Defence Staff ===
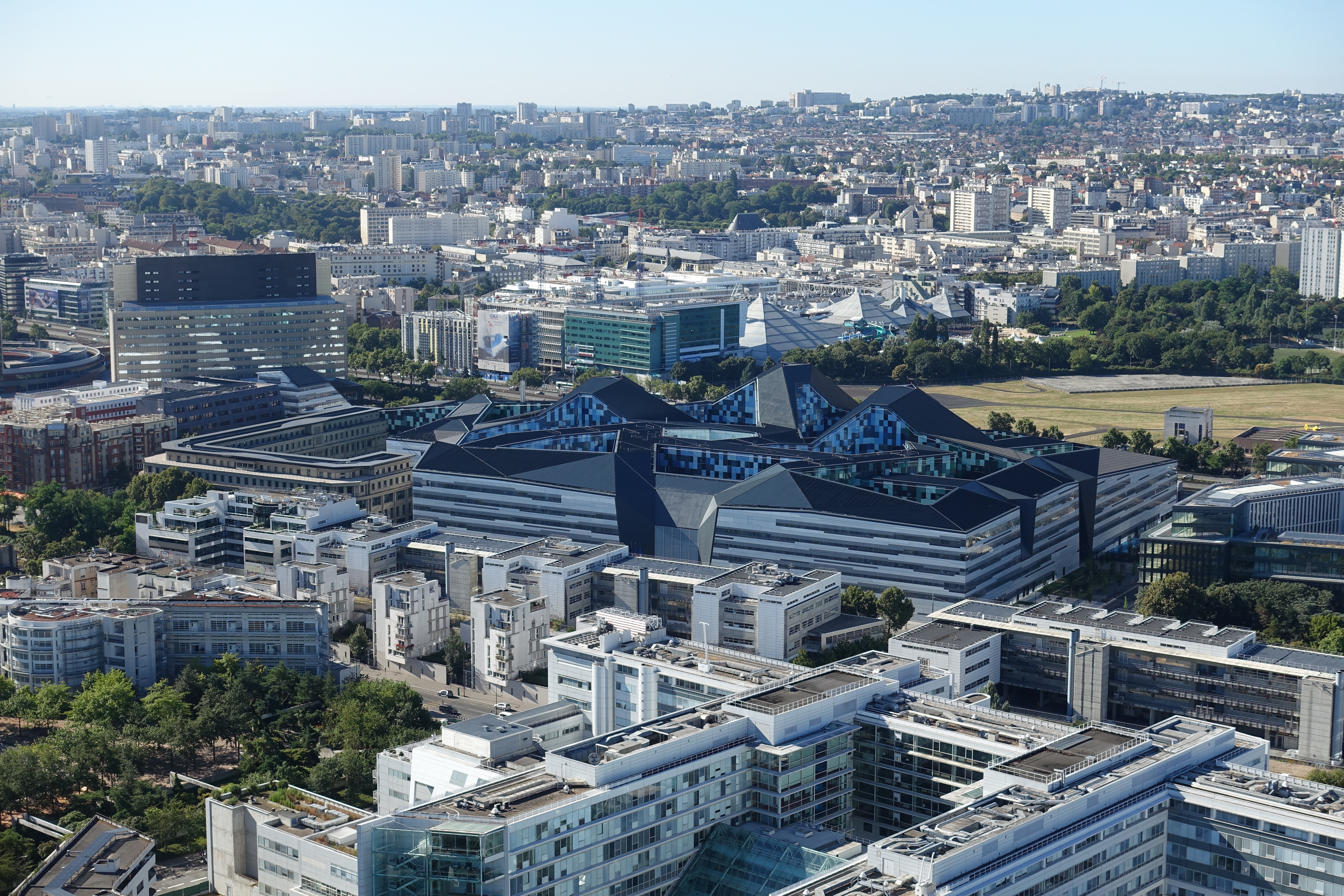
Hexagone Balard, the headquarters of the French Armed Forces

The Chief of the Defence Staff (CEMA) reports directly to the Minister. He is in charge of conducting operations, troops training, troops inspection, programming the force's future, and gathering and analyzing Intelligence. He is also in charge of maintaining relationships with other countries' armed forces.

The position of Chief of the Defence Staff was held by French Army General Pierre de Villiers until 20 July 2017, when he resigned without an official reason. However, sources suggest that this was done as a protest against the defence budget cuts announced contrary to previous assurances to increase defence spending. French Army General François Lecointre took over as Chief of Staff of the Armed Forces the following day.

=== SGA ===
The Secretary-General for Administration is in charge of the general administration of the Department. He assists the Minister for:

- Elaborating Budget
- Legal advice
- Human resources policy
- Housing resources
- Social Management

The position is held by Jean-Paul Bodin.

=== DGA ===
The Direction Générale de l'Armement is the research and development service of the Department. It is in charge of furnishing equipment to all branches of the Armed Forces and creating future equipment for them. The service manages more than 80 projects and contributed more than 7.5 billion euros to the national industry in 2011.

== Headquarters ==
The headquarters of the Ministry of the Armies is at the Hotel de Brienne, in the 7th Arrondissement of Paris, but all services have since been moved to a new headquarters.

On 5 November 2015, French president François Hollande inaugurated The new French Defence Ministry headquarters at Balard Site, nicknamed Hexagone Balard or "Balardgon" to mimic its American counterpart The Pentagon.

Hexagone Balard concentrates all components of the French Armed Forces, and houses the Chief of Staff of the Army, Chief of Staff of the Navy, Chief of Staff of the Air and Space Force, the Direction générale de l'armement, the General Secretary for the Administration and the Chief of the Defence Staff, while the office of the Minister of the Armed Forces remained in the Hotel de Brienne. It is a 250,000 square metres (2,690,978 Sq Ft) building on grounds measuring 39.5 acres (16.5 hectares).

Its nickname "Hexagon" was given to the project because of the shape of the ministry building. The centre of the quadrilateral that forms the whole of the West plot consists of two buildings of hexagonal shape.

== Agencies ==
- Bureau enquêtes accidents pour la sécurité de l'aéronautique d'État (BEA-É) - accident investigation agency for government and military aircraft
- Bureau enquêtes accidents défense mer (BEAD-mer) - agency for investigating accidents and incidents on government and military sea transport
- Bureau enquêtes accidents défense de transport terrestre (BEAD-TT) - Agency for such involving land transport.

== See also ==
- Chief of the Defence Staff
  - Chief of Staff of the French Army
  - Chief of Staff of the French Air and Space Force
  - Chief of Staff of the French Navy
  - Special Operations Command
  - Direction générale de la Gendarmerie Nationale
- Directorate General for External Security (DGSE)
