= Pierre de Villiers =

French Army general (born 1956)

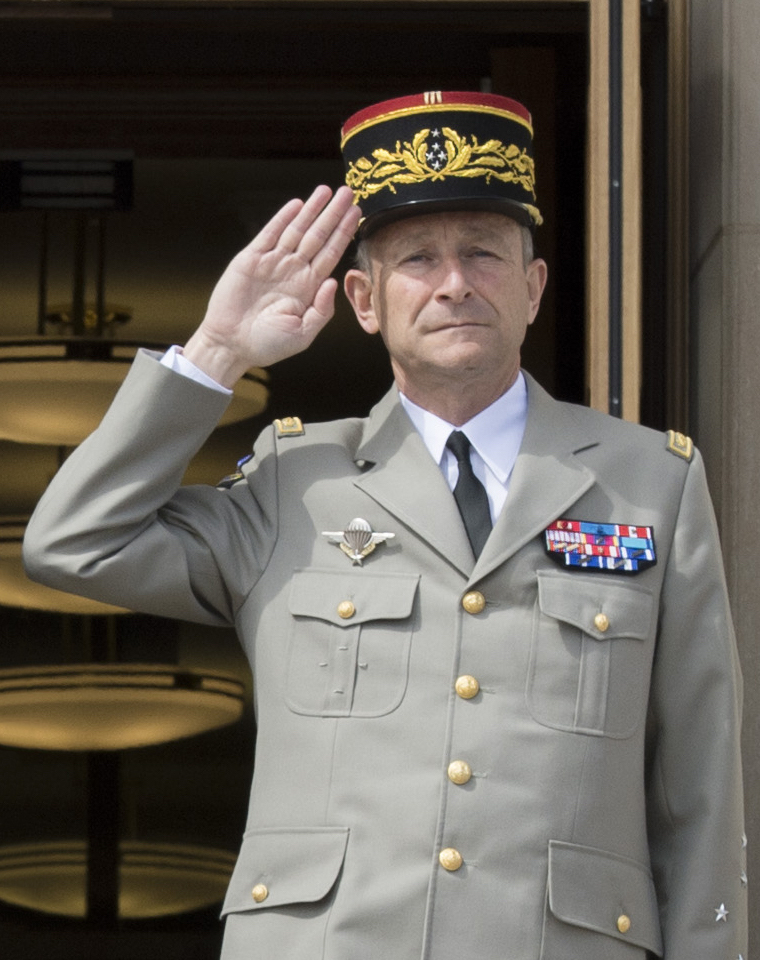
- General de Villiers in 2014

Chief of the Defence Staff
- In office 15 February 2014 – 19 July 2017
- Preceded by: Édouard Guillaud
- Succeeded by: François Lecointre

Major General of the Defence Staff
- In office 11 March 2010 – 15 February 2014
- Preceded by: Pierrick Blairon
- Succeeded by: Gratien Maire

Head of the Prime Minister's military cabinet
- In office 15 September 2008 – 11 March 2010
- Prime Minister: François Fillon
- Preceded by: Jean-Marc Denuel
- Succeeded by: Bernard de Courrèges d'Ustou

Personal details
- Born: Pierre François Marie Le Jolis de Villiers de Saintignon; 26 July 1956 (age 70) Boulogne, France
- Relations: Philippe de Villiers (brother)
- Children: 6
- Education: Prytanée National Militaire; École spéciale militaire

Military service
- Allegiance: French Republic
- Branch/service: French Army: Armoured Cavalry Arm
- Years of service: 1975 – 2017
- Rank: Army general
- Unit: 2nd Dragoon Regiment; 7th Armoured Division; 501st–503rd Combat Tank Regiment
- Commands: 2nd Armoured Brigade
- Battles/wars: Kosovo War; Afghanistan War; Mali Civil War; Operation Barkhane; Third Central African Civil War; Operation Sangaris; Second Iraqi Civil War; Syrian Civil War; Operation Chammal

Pierre François Marie Le Jolis de Villiers de Saintignon (French: [pjɛʁ də vilje]; born 26 July 1956) is a retired French Army general who served as Chief of the Defence Staff from 2014 to 2017.

Following a disagreement on policy orientations with newly-elected President Emmanuel Macron, commander-in-chief of the Armed Forces, he tendered his resignation, a first under the Fifth Republic. Since his retirement from active service de Villiers has published a number of essays on geopolitics.

His brother Philippe de Villiers was involved in politics and ran twice as a presidential candidate.

== Biography ==
=== House of Le Jolis de Villiers ===
Family coat of arms

Pierre Le Jolis de Villiers de Saintignon is a member of the House of Le Jolis de Villiers (French: Famille Le Jolis de Villiers) established in the 16th century. His brother is the French politician Philippe de Villiers.

== Early military career ==
=== 20th century ===
After two years of preparatory corniche (French: corniche) at Prytanée National Militaire, Pierre de Villiers was admitted to the École spéciale militaire de Saint-Cyr in 1975, promotion Captain Henri Guilleminot (French: Henri Guilleminot). He entered at the end of his scholarity the Armoured Cavalry Arm and joined the Saumur Cavalry School within his specialty, promotion Lieutenant Charles de Foucauld. He was a section platoon chief of AMX-30 tanks at the 2nd Dragoon Regiment in 1978.

Between 1979 and 1987 Pierre de Villiers served in the 4th Dragoon Regiment, which also housed a platoon of AMX-30 tanks. He commanded a divisionary reconnaissance squadron of the 7th Armoured Division. He was then on three different occasions an instructor of sous-officiers and lieutenants at Saumur. From 1989 to 1990, he was a candidate at the Superior War School of the 103rd promotion of the ESG, then from 1990–1991, he was a candidate at the Superior Inter-arm Course (XLII session of the CSI).

He was then designated as the regimental commander of the 501st–503rd Combat Tank Regiment. In June 1999, he commanded during five months the mechanized infantry battalion of the Leclerc brigade, which entered first in Kosovo with operation KFOR. During twelve years, he was in post in Paris at the general staff headquarters of the French Army, then at the inspection of the French Army and member of the financial affairs direction of the Ministry of Defence.

=== 21st century ===
From September to June 2004, he was an auditor at the Centre of High Military Studies and at the Institute of High National Defence Studies. Deputy to the Head of the Prime Minister's military cabinet on 1 July 2004, he was promoted to général de brigade on 1 September 2005.

He was designated commandant of the 2nd Armoured Brigade and arms commandant of the court of Orléans (French: commandant d'armes de la place d'Orléans) on 1 August 2006, a function which he occupied until 31 August 2008. In parallel, from December 2006 to April 2007, he commanded the Regional Capital Command RCC in Afghanistan which regrouped 2,500 military personnel from 15 nationalities.

He was nominated as Head of the Prime Minister's military cabinet on 15 September 2008, a function which he occupied until March 2010, date in which he was replaced by Bernard de Courrèges d'Ustou (French: Bernard de Courrèges d'Ustou). By decree on 11 March 2010, he was nominated to the functions of Major General of the Armed Forces at the general staff headquarters of the armed forces.

== Chief of the Defence Staff ==
De Villiers was appointed on 15 February 2014 Chief of the Defence Staff succeeding Admiral Édouard Guillaud. Charged with attacks against the Islamic State after the November 2015 Paris attacks, he judged that the necessary military attacks against this entity can only but guarantee peace and security, by recalling the comfort means of the French Armed Forces.

He coordinated the exterior operations of Operation Barkhane in Sahel, Operation Sangaris in Central African Republic and Operation Chammal in Syria and in Iraq. He was also equally in charge of the interior natured anti-terrorist operation, Opération Sentinelle.

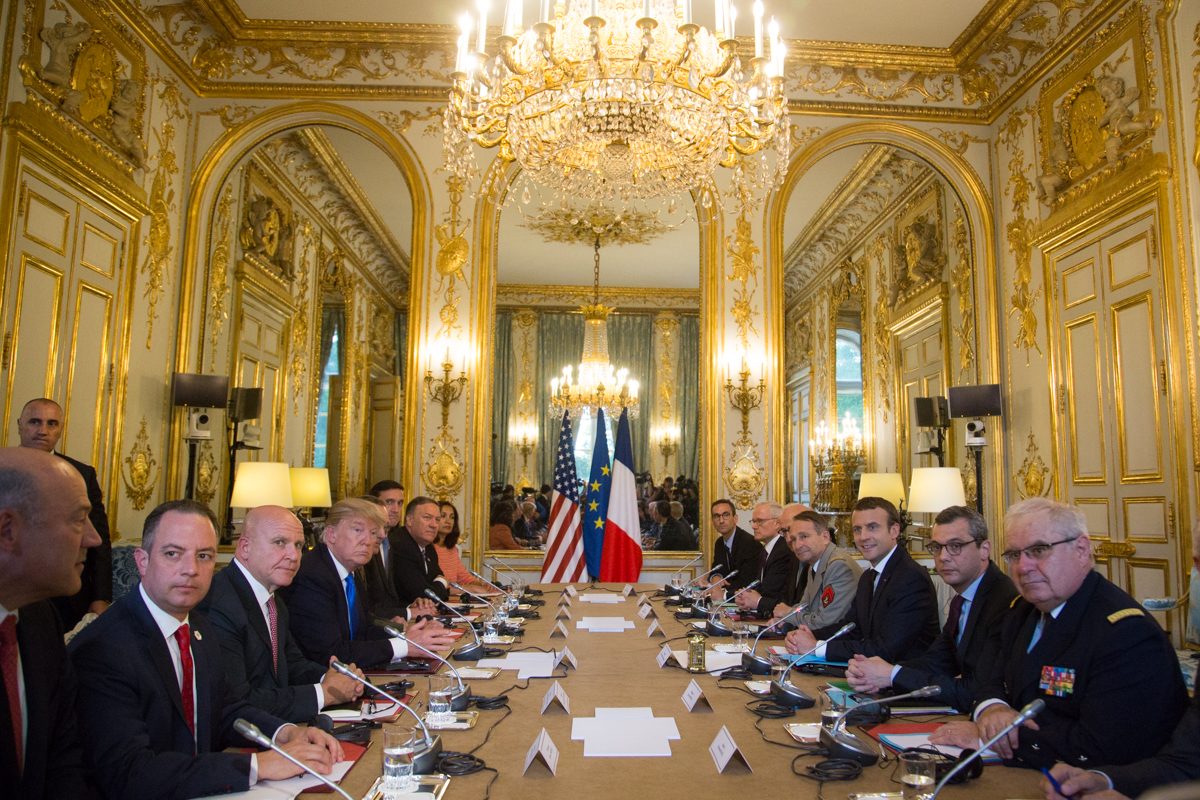
General Pierre de Villiers with President Macron at the Élysée Palace during a meeting with US President Trump, 13 July 2017.

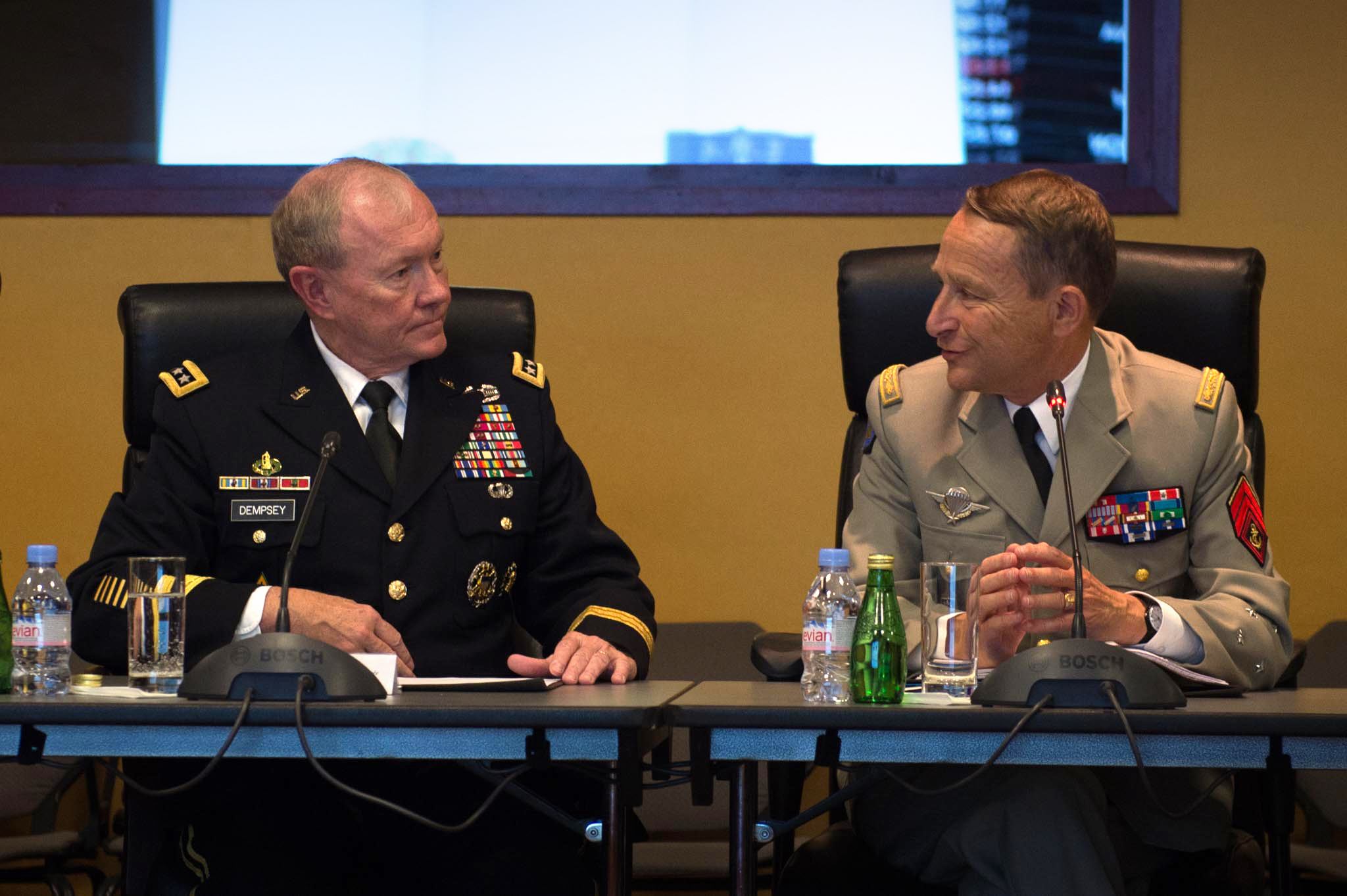
Pierre de Villiers with US General Martin E. Dempsey, on 18 September 2014

The French Foreign Legion, on 30 April 2015, commemorated their 152nd anniversary of Camarón in presence of Chief of the Defence Staff Pierre de Villiers. Commemorating also the 70th Liberation Anniversary, General Pierre de Villiers declared that "commemorating Camerone is commemorating the courage, the cult of the mission, the respect of senior veterans, giving the youth a formidable message of hope for the future", while also adding that "honour and fidelity are always values which gather".

During the ceremony, Adjudant-Chef François Monarcha, born in Poland 98 years prior, was part of the main parade as he was accompanied by a former Harki and a non-commissioned officer of British origin. Addressing the legionnaires, General de Villiers declared: "Your regimental colours and flags do not have enough folds and space in them to house and contain all your titles of glory".

=== Position on the defence budget ===
In December 2016, Pierre de Villiers called for an increase in armed forces' budget from 1.7% to 2% of gross domestic product (GDP) before 2022. This would allow France to meet the NATO defense spending requirements which at the time were only met by the United States, Greece, United Kingdom, Estonia and Poland.

In March 2017, Pierre de Villiers again expressed support for increasing the defence budget to 2% of GDP by 2022 - an increase of about three billion euros per year. Emmanuel Macron announced a promise to increase the defence budget to 2% by 2025 and Marine Le Pen announced in Lyon that she wishes to see the defence budget increased to 3% of GDP in order to build a new aircraft carrier, recruit 50,000 new military personnel, and progressively reintroduce compulsory military service, starting with a 3-month commitment.

=== Criticism of Macron and resignation ===
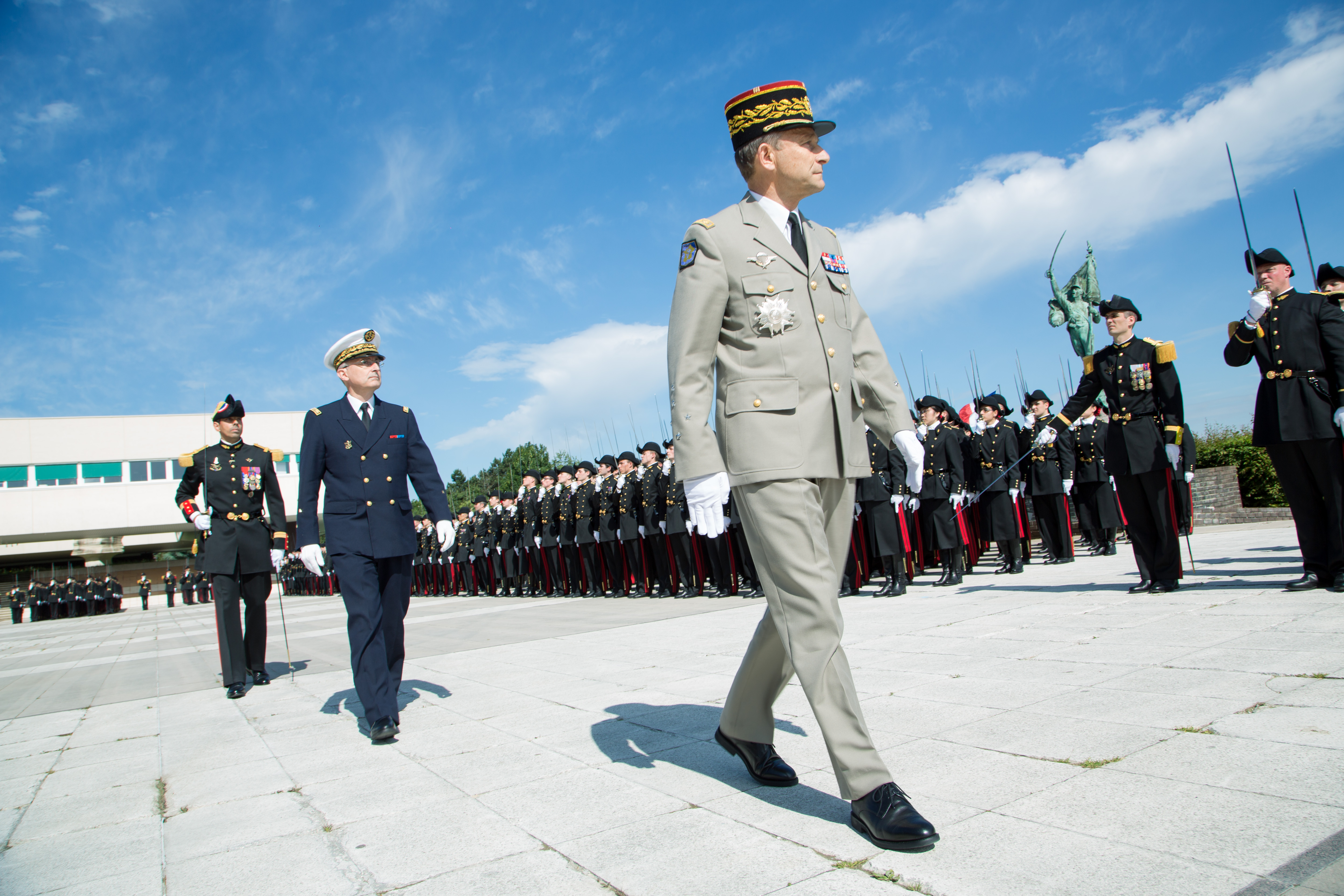
General Pierre de Villiers in 2014

On 11 July 2017, Minister of Public Action and Accounts Gérald Darmanin announced that part of the government's plan to reduce spending, the military were going to be cut by 850 million euros in 2017. The following day, Le Monde reported that de Villiers met with the Defence Committee in the National Assembly and told them "I will not get fucked over like this". The conversation was caught on tape and leaked by Le Monde. Also, accordingly to Le Figaro, de Villiers unleashed his fury, and added monumentally "I can no longer look my guys in the eyes if we reduce our means further".

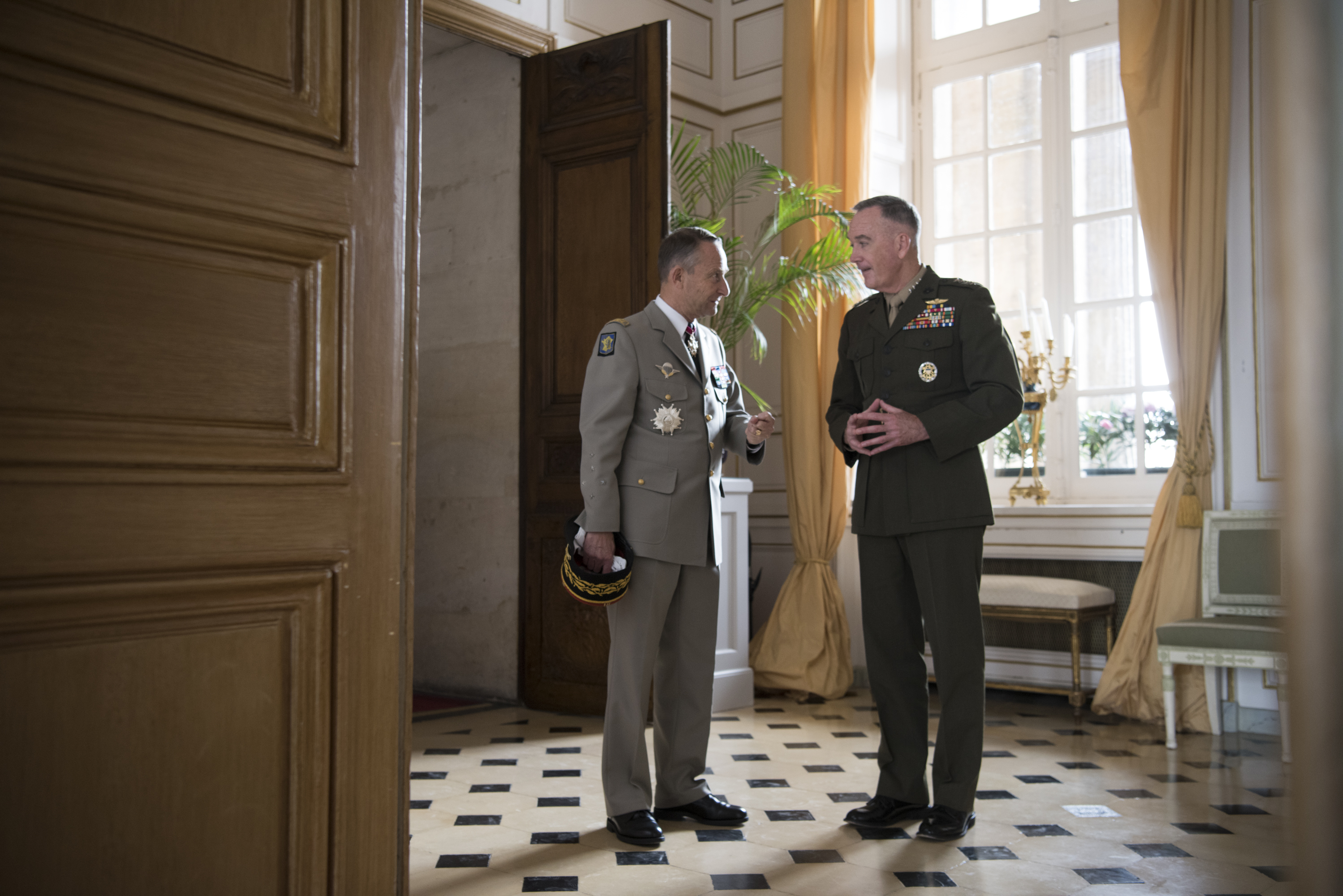
General Pierre de Villiers with General Joseph Dunford at Washington, DC (13 July 2017).

Emmanuel Macron, during a speech to the armed forces on 13 July 2017 in which he famously said "I am the boss", affirmed his plan to raise the defence budget to 2% of GDP by 2025. During the speech, Macron publicly called out de Villiers numerous times, addressing the recent leak reported by Le Monde. During Bastille Day military parade, General de Villiers and President Macron, as customary for the Chief and Commander-in-Chief of the French Armed Forces, rode together standing side by side in the same vehicle during the ceremonial parade.

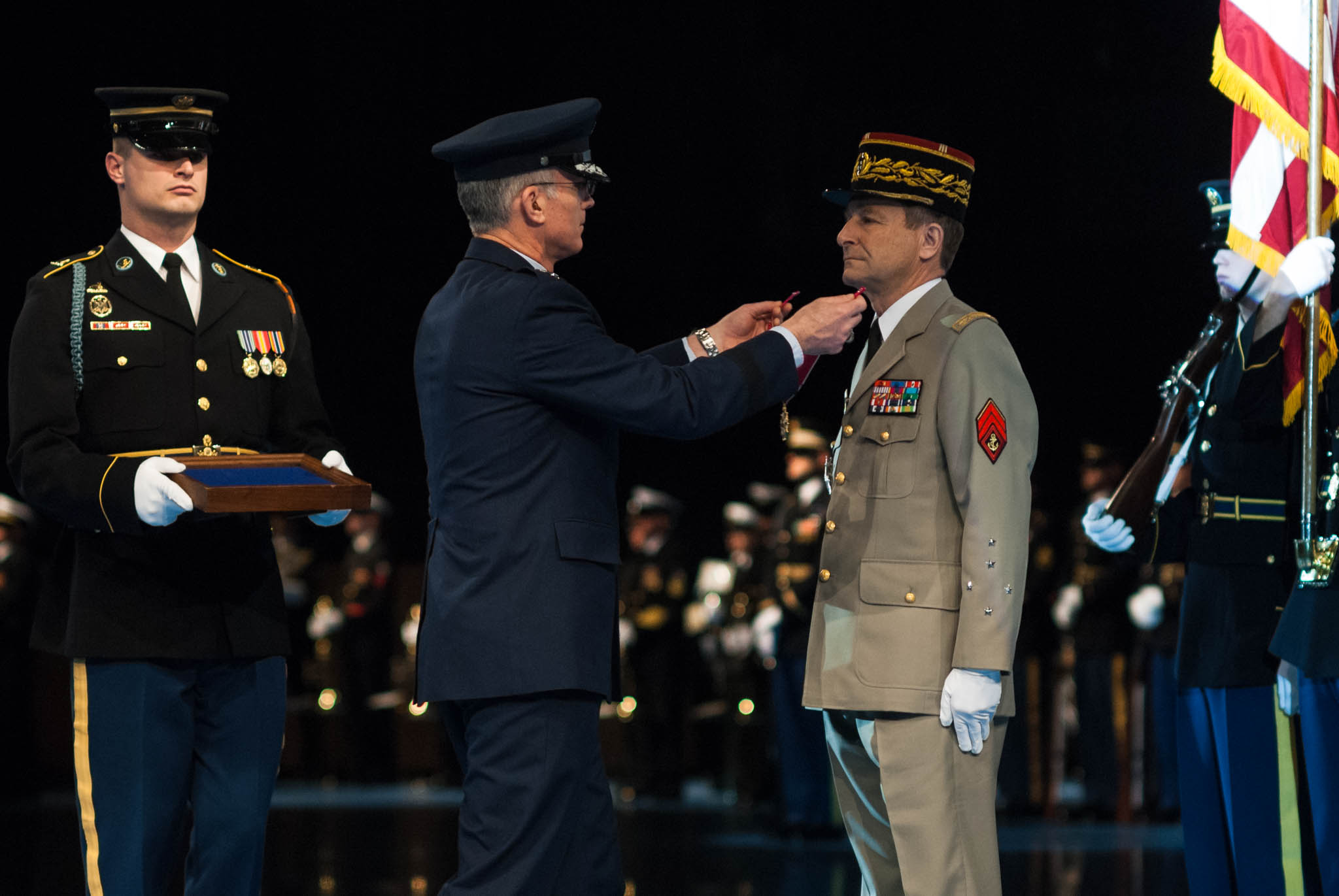
General Pierre de Villiers receives the Legion of Merit as the United States Navy Ceremonial Band stands at attention (6 February 2017).

Following the Bastille Day parade, de Villiers posted on Facebook a criticism of the government's plans to reduce defence spending. Le Journal du Dimanche reported on 16 July 2017 that Macron was possibly looking to replace de Villiers stating "The Republic doesn't work like this". Macron then went on to say that he has confidence in de Villiers.

General de Villiers stepped down on 19 July 2017 due to budget cuts and disagreements with President Macron. This was the first time under the Fifth Republic that a Chief of the Defence Staff has forcibly resigned. A press release was issued on francetvinfo's website. On the same day, Macron confirmed army general François Lecointre as de Villiers's replacement. Macron described de Villiers's behaviour surrounding his resignation as "undignified".

While de Villiers was leaving the Ministry of the Armed Forces, a crowd of soldiers and military personnel applauded him.

== In retirement ==
Following his resignation, speculation arose that he might enter politics: polling in 2020 found that 20% of French voters might have supported him in the 2022 presidential election.

== Military ranks ==
Ranks attained in the French Army
| Élève-officier (Note: First year of ESM Saint-Cyr) | Aspirant (Note: Second year of ESM Saint-Cyr) | Sous-lieutenant (Note: Third year of ESM Saint-Cyr) | Lieutenant (Note: Upon leaving ESM Saint-Cyr) | Capitaine | Chef d'escadrons |
| 1975 | 1976 | 1 August 1977 | 1 August 1978 | 1 August 1982 | 1 July 1988 |
| Lieutenant-colonel | Colonel | Général de brigade | Général de division | Général de corps d'armée (Note: Not a rank, but a position and style) | Général d'armée |
| 1 July 1992 | 1 December 1997 | 1 December 2005 | 1 July 2008 | 1 November 2009 | 11 March 2010 |

== Honours and decorations ==
Honours and decorations
National honours
| Ribbon bar | Name | Date | Source |
|---|---|---|---|
| | Grand Officer of the National Order of the Legion of Honour | 28 June 2013 | |
| | Commander of the National Order of the Legion of Honour | 17 July 2007 | |
| | Officer of the National Order of the Legion of Honour | 14 September 2005 | |
| | Knight of the National Order of the Legion of Honour | 22 July 1997 | |
| | Officer of the National Order of Merit | 10 December 2002 | |
| | Knight of the National Order of Merit | 17 January 1993 | - |
Military decorations
| Ribbon bar | Name | | Source |
| | Combatant's Cross - Two clasps | | - |
| | Cross for Military Valour - Bronze star (one citation) | | - |
| | National Defence Medal - Gold grade with bronze palm (one army level citation) | | - |
| | Medal of Youth and Sports - Bronze grade | | - |
| | French commemorative medal | | - |
| Croix de Guerre des Theatres d'Operations Exterieurs ribbon | Croix de guerre des théâtres d'opérations extérieures | | - |
| | NATO Medal - Ex-Yugoslavia clasp | | - |
| | NATO Medal - Kosovo clasp | | - |
| | NATO Medal - ISAF clasp | | - |
Foreign honours
| Ribbon bar | Name | Country | Source |
| ITA OMRI 2001 GUff BAR | Grand Officer of the Order of Merit of the Italian Republic | Italy | - |
| | Commander's Cross of the Order of Merit of the Federal Republic of Germany | Germany | |
| | Commander of the Legion of Merit | United States | - |
| | Commander of the National Order of the Lion | Senegal | - |
| | Commander of the Order of Merit | Niger | - |
| Mali Ordre national du Mali Commandeur ribbon | Commander of the National Order of Mali | Mali | - |
| Burkina Faso Ordre national Commandeur ribbon | Commander of the National Order of Burkina Faso | Burkina Faso | - |
| | Officer of the Order pro Merito Melitensi | SMOM | - |
| Ordre de l'Ouissam Alaouite Officier ribbon (Maroc) | Officier of the Order of Ouissam Alaouite | Morocco | - |
| | Officer of the National Order of Chad | Chad | |
| | Officer of the Order of Valour | Cameroon | |
| | Medal of Gratitude of the Armed Forces | Gabon | - |
Badges
| Insignia | Name | | |
| | French Parachutist Badge | | |
| | Chief of the Defence Staff Badge | | |

Pierre de Villiers is an Honorary Caporal (bestowed) of the Troupes de marine (2014).

== Publications ==
- Servir (Paris: ed. Fayard, 2017)
- Qu'est-ce-qu'un chef ? (Paris: ed. Fayard, 2018)
- L'équilibre est un courage (Paris: ed. Fayard, 2020)
- Paroles d'honneur (Paris: ed. Fayard, 2022)
- Pour le succès des armes de la France (Paris: ed. Fayard, 2025)

== See also ==
- Édouard Guillaud
- Bruno Dary
- Benoît Puga
- Jean Maurin
- Hervé Charpentier
- François Lecointre

== Notes and references ==
=== References ===
Military offices
| Preceded by Édouard Guillaud | Chief of the Defence Staff; 15 February 2014 – 19 July 2017 | Succeeded by François Lecointre |
