= Jean-Louis Georgelin =

French general (1948–2023)

Jean-Louis Georgelin

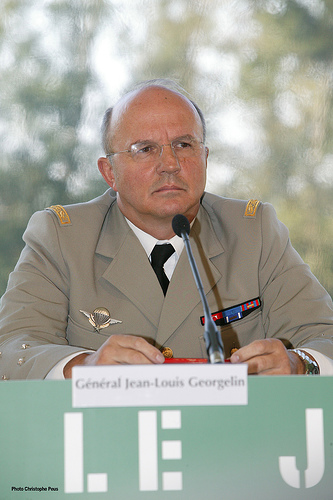
- Georgelin in 2007
- Born: Jean-Louis Marie Georgelin; 30 August 1948; Aspet, Haute-Garonne, France
- Died: 18 August 2023 (aged 74); Bordes-Uchentein, Ariège, France
- Military career
- Allegiance: France
- Branch: French Army
- Service years: 1967–2010
- Rank: General; Chief of the Military Staff; Chief of the Defence Staff
- Unit: 153rd Infantry Regiment
- Awards: Légion d'honneur Ordre national du Mérite; Bundesverdienstkreuz; Legion of Merit
- Other work: Grand Chancellor of the Légion d'honneur (2010–2016)

Jean-Louis Marie Georgelin (French pronunciation: [ʒɑ̃lwi ʒɔʁʒ(ə)lɛ̃]; 30 August 1948 – 18 August 2023) was a French Army general who served as Chief of the Defence Staff (Chef d'état-major des armées, CEMA) from 4 October 2006 to 25 February 2010. From 9 June 2010 until 31 August 2016 he served as Grand Chancellor of the Légion d'honneur, the French national order.

On 17 April 2019, Georgelin was appointed the special representative to oversee the reconstruction of Notre-Dame de Paris after it was severely damaged by fire, and continued in this role until his death.

== Biography ==
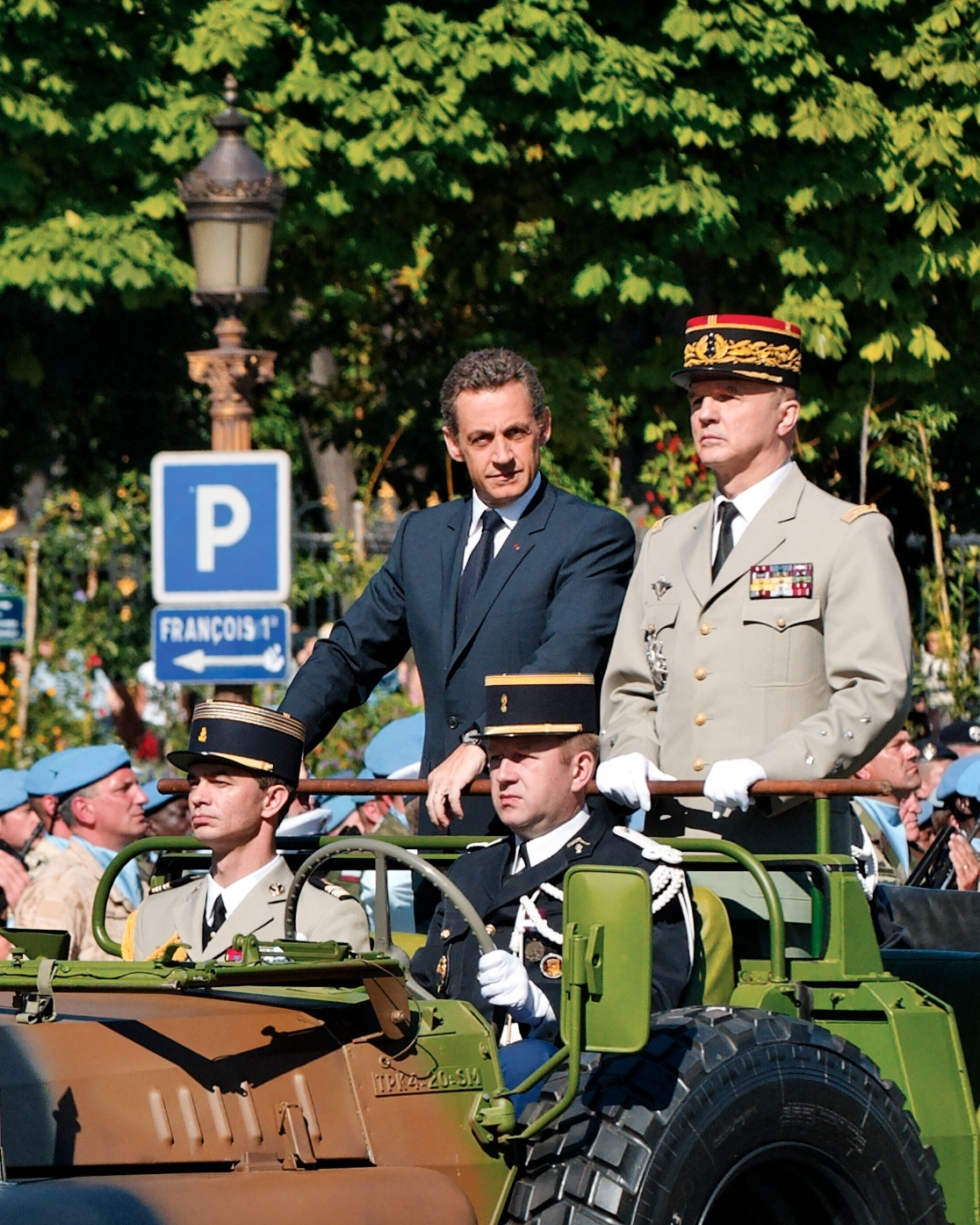
Jean-Louis Georgelin and President Nicolas Sarkozy at Bastille Day 2008

After nine years at the Prytanée National Militaire, Georgelin joined Saint-Cyr in 1967. As a lieutenant, he was Chef de Section (Platoon Commander) at the École d'application de l'infanterie (Infantry School) from 1975 to 1976, responsible for the training of non-commissioned officers. He served with the 153rd Infantry Regiment as a Captain.

As a Commandant (Major), he graduated from the United States Army Command and General Staff College at Fort Leavenworth and then from the Institute of Higher National Defence Studies (IHEDN) in Paris.

From 1985 to 1988, as a lieutenant-colonel, he was in charge of a class at Saint-Cyr (promotion Cadets de la France Libre). He then served as the chief of staff of the Army in the financial department from 1988 to 1991. He was an aide to the chief of cabinet of the Prime Minister from 1994 to 1997. From 1998 and 2002 he served at the general staff of the Army, directing the "plans, programmes and evaluations" division.

Georgelin was the personal chief of staff of President Jacques Chirac from 25 October 2002 to 4 October 2006. He was promoted to général d'armée on 3 October 2003.

Georgelin was promoted to Chief of the Defence Staff by the Council of Ministers on 20 August 2006. He was named the Grand Chancellor of the French national order of the Legion of Honour by the Council of Ministers on 9 June 2010.

On 17 April 2019, Georgelin was appointed special representative to oversee the reconstruction of Notre-Dame-de-Paris after it was severely damaged by fire.

On 18 August 2023, Georgelin died after falling off a mountain during an alpine hike. His body was discovered at Mont Valier peak in the Pyrenees mountains straddling the France-Spain border. Georgelin was 74, and his death was ruled as having likely been due to an accident. Civil servant Philippe Jost (fr) succeeded Georgelin in leading the reconstruction.

== Honours ==
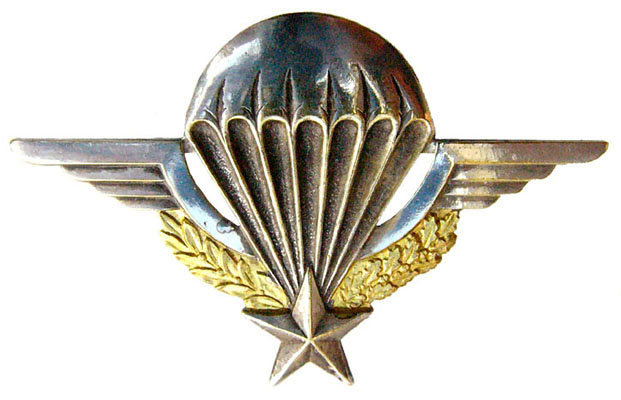
- French Parachutist Badge
- Grand Cross of the Légion d'honneur (France)
- Grand Cross of the Ordre national du Mérite (France)
- French Order of Academic Palms, Commander
- French Order of Arts and Letters, Commander
- French commemorative medal
- NATO Medal for the former Yugoslavia with bar
- Order of Merit of the Federal Republic of Germany, Commander's Cross
- Commander of the US Legion of Merit
- Sash of the Order of the Aztec Eagle (Mexico)
- Order pro Merito Melitensi (Order of Merit of the Sovereign Military Order of Malta), Grand Cross with swords
- Equestrian Order of the Holy Sepulchre of Jerusalem, Cross of Merit with Gold Star (Holy See)
- Distinguished Service Order (Military), Singapore
- Order of Excellence, Grand Cross (Pakistan)
- Order of Bernardo O'Higgins, Grand Cross (Chile)
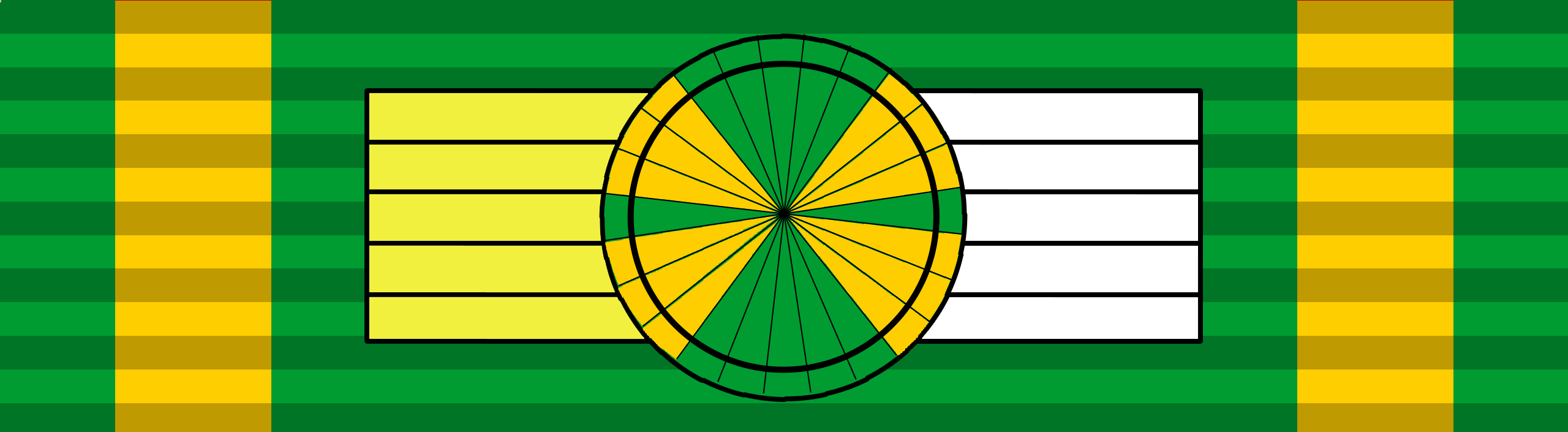
- Order of King Abdulaziz, Grand Officer (Saudi Arabia)
- Order of Aviz, Grand Officer (Portugal)
- Order of Saint-Charles, Grand Officer (Monaco)
- Order of Merit of the Italian Republic, Grand Officer (Italy)
- Military Order of Morocco, 2nd class
- Order of the British Empire, Honorary Knight Commander (Military)
- Order of Isabella the Catholic, Commander (Spain)
- Order of Léopold, Commander (Belgium)
- Order of the Crown, Commander (Belgium)
- Order of Merit of the Republic of Hungary, Commander
- Order of the Southern Cross, Commander (Brazil)
- Order of Merit of the Central African Republic, Commander
- National Order of Merit of Benin, Commander
- National Order of Mali, Commander
- National Order of Niger, Commander
- National Order of Chad, Commander
- Order of Merit of the Republic of Poland, Commander
- Order of Valour, Commander (Cameroon)

== Notes ==
Military offices
Preceded by Henri Bentégeat	Chief of the Military Staff of the President of the Republic; 10 May 2002 – 2 September 2006	Succeeded by Édouard Guillaud
Preceded by Henri Bentégeat	Chief of the Defence Staff; 4 October 2006 – 24 February 2010	Succeeded by Édouard Guillaud
Political offices
Preceded by Jean-Pierre Kelche	Grand Chancellor of the Legion of Honour; 9 June 2010 – 31 August 2016	Succeeded by Benoît Puga
