= Benoît Puga =

French Army general (born 1953)

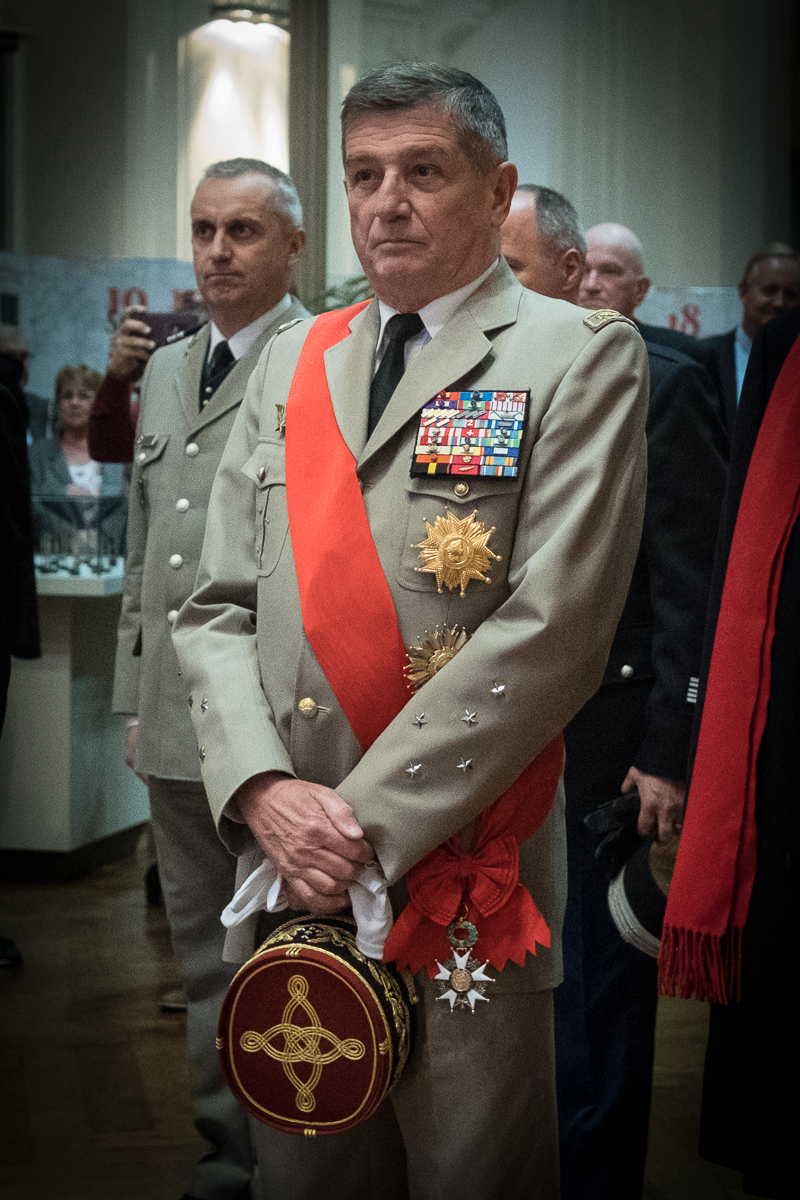
- General Puga in 2019

Grand Chancellor of the National Order of the Legion of Honour and the National Order of Merit
- In office 1 September 2016 – 31 January 2023
- Preceded by: Jean-Louis Georgelin
- Succeeded by: François Lecointre

Chief of the Military Staff of the President of the Republic
- In office 5 March 2010 – 6 July 2016
- President: Nicolas Sarkozy; François Hollande
- Preceded by: Édouard Guillaud
- Succeeded by: Bernard Rogel

Director of Military Intelligence
- In office 1 September 2008 – 4 March 2010
- President: Nicolas Sarkozy
- Preceded by: Michel Masson
- Succeeded by: Didier Bolelli

Personal details
- Born: Benoît Marie Puga; 30 January 1953 (age 73) Saint-Mandé, France
- Parent: Hubert Puga (father)
- Relatives: Denis Puga
- Education: École Spéciale Militaire; École Militaire; École de l'infanterie

Military service
- Allegiance: France
- Branch/service: French Army: Infantry; Foreign Legion
- Years of service: 1975–2016
- Rank: Army general
- Unit: 2nd Foreign Parachute Regiment
- Commands: 2nd Foreign Parachute Regiment; Special Operation Command; Directorate of Military Intelligence
- Battles/wars: Angolan Civil War; Battle of Kolwezi; Chadian–Libyan conflict; Operation Manta; Yugoslav Wars; Central African Armed Forces mutinies; Operation Almandin 2; Operation Almandin 3; Congo Civil War; Operation Pélican 1; Operation Pélican 2; Operation Pélican 3

Benoît Marie Puga (French pronunciation: [bənwa pyɡa]; born 30 January 1953) is a retired general in the French Army and former Grand Chancellor of the National Order of the Legion of Honour and the National Order of Merit (2016–2023). He previously served as Director of Military Intelligence (2008–2010) and Chief of the Military Staff of the President of the Republic (2010–2016).

== Military career ==
Puga joined the École spéciale militaire de Saint-Cyr in September 1973, at the age of 20, following which he joined the Infantry Application School in 1975 with a rank of sous-lieutenant.

In September 1976, Puga joined the 1st Chasseur Group at Reims as an infantry section chief (French: chef de section) before becoming a platoon missile section chief. From August to October, he conducted a tour at the corps of a reconnaissance helicopter unit of the 2^{e} ACR belonging to the VIIth U.S. Army Corps stationed at Nuremberg in Germany. He was promoted to the rank of lieutenant on 1 August 1976.

On 1 April 1978, Puga was assigned to the 2nd Foreign Parachute Regiment 2^{e} REP, where he was, in succession, section chief, assistant officer, and commander of a company in a unit combat capacity. Accordingly, he was promoted to the rank of captain. He participated in several operations and exterior deployment: at Kolwezy in Zaire in 1978, at Gabon in 1979, at Djibouti in 1980 and 1981, at Beirut in 1982, at Bangui in Central African Republic in 1983 and Tchad in 1984.

In August 1984, Puga joined the general staff headquarters of the French Army. He was appointed as quarter officer at the operational center, a post which he left in August 1986 to become chargé for a year. He was promoted to the rank of chef de bataillon in 1985.

A candidate at the Superior War School and the Superior Inter-Arm Course (CSI) from September 1987 to June 1989, Puga received the command of an officer promotion class at Saint-Cyr from 1989 to 1992 where, a lieutenant colonel, he successively commanded the 3rd, 2nd and 1st battalions.

In August 1992, Puga rejoined the general staff headquarters at Paris at the corps of the study bureau and participated in the reorganization of the operational command of the armed forces. From February 1994 to June 1996, he was detached, first as a military assistant to the commandant of FORPRONU in ex-Yugoslavia from March 1994 to April 1995, then as military counselor of the co-president of the international conference for ex-Yugoslavia and European negotiator for the peace accords of Dayton, from May to December 1995, a personality which was the High representative of the international community in Bosnia. He was promoted to the rank of colonel in 1994.

On 9 August 1996, Puga received the regimental colors of the 2nd Foreign Parachute Regiment 2^{e} REP and participated at the head of that regiment to operations in « Malabo » at Brazzaville in 1996, « Almandin II & III » at Bangui in RCA in 1996 and 1997, then Pelican I, II, III at Brazzaville in the Congo in 1997. He assumed particularly the command of operation Pelican III.

From September 1998 to August 1999, Puga was designated as cadre professor of the Inter-Arm Defense College (CID). During this period, he was detached from May to August 1999 near the special envoy for the Balkans of the Secretary General of the United Nations, as military counselor, and participated at this foreign title to the negotiations on the deployment of UNMIK in Kosovo and the stability pact in the Balkans.

From September 1999 to July 2000, Puga was an auditor for the 52nd session of IHEDN and the 49th session of the CHEM, then he occupied successively the functions of assistant « Terre » then inter-arms assistant to the chief Admiral at the Inter-Arms Operational Center (COIA) of the État-Major des Armées.

On 1 September 2004, Puga was designated as the head commandant of the Special Operation Command (COS).

On 1 July 2007, Puga assumed the functions of deputy chief (French: sous-chef) of operations at the general staff headquarters of the Armies and was elevated to the rank designation of général de corps d'armée. Director of the Direction du renseignement militaire in September 2008, he was designated as Chief of the Military Staff of the President of the Republic of President of France, Nicolas Sarkozy by replacing in the post Admiral Édouard Guillaud, who was nominated to Chief of the Defence Staff. During this time, Puga was maintained twice in his post by President Francois Hollande.

On 16 January 2014, Puga, Chief of the Military Staff of the President of the Republic was maintained in the 1st section of officer generals of the French Army until 30 August 2015. On 23 August 2016, Puga was designated by decree nomination as Grand Chancellor of the Legion of Honor (French: Grand Chancelier de la Légion d'honneur) GC-L.H succeeding Général Jean-Louis Georgelin.

== Honours and decorations ==
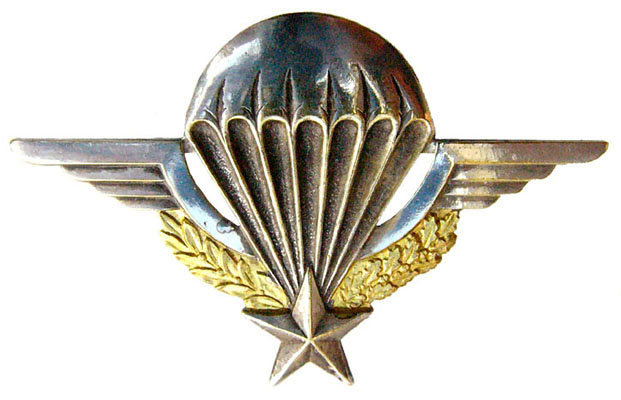

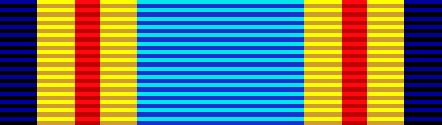

- French Parachutist Badge
- Grand Cross of the Legion of Honour
- Commandeur of the Légion d'Honneur (2006)
- Officier of the Légion d'Honneur (1998)
- Chevalier of the Légion d'Honneur (1991)
- Grand Croix de l'ordre national du Mérite
- Croix de la Valeur militaire (8 citations, 2 étoiles en vermeil et 6 en bronze)
- Ordre des Palmes académiques, Commander
- Order of Agricultural Merit, Commander
- Croix du combattant
- Overseas Medal (5 agrafes – clasps)
- Médaille de la Défense nationale (National Defence Medal in bronze)
- Médaille de reconnaissance de la Nation
- Médaille commémorative française
- United Nations Medal for Croatia with numeral 2
- Order of Prince Danilo I, Knight Commander (Montenegro)
- NATO Medal for the former Yugoslavia
- Order of the Holy Sepulchre, Cross of Merit with Gold Star (Holy See)
- Order pro Merito Melitensi, Military Grand Cross with swords (Malta)
- Order of the Nile, Grand Officer (Egypt)
- Order of the Military, 2nd class (Morocco)
- Ordre de la reconnaissance centrafricaine, commandeur
- Commander of the National Order of Merit (Mauritania)
- National Order of Niger, Commander
- National Order of Mali, Commander
- Legion of Merit, Commander
- Defense Intelligence Agency Director's Award
- Order of Merit of Germany, Grand Cross
- Order of the Lion, Commander (Senegal)
- Ordre National, Commandeur (Côte d'Ivoire)
- Order of Merit of Poland, Grand Cross
- Order of the White Lion, 3rd class (Czechoslovakia)
- Order of the Republic, Commander (Tunisia)
- Order of the Southern Cross, Grand Officer (Brazil)
- Order of Ouissam Alaouite, Grand Officer (Morocco)
- USSOCOM Medal
- Croix de la bravoure militaire de Zaire (Cross of Military Bravery of Zaire) with gold palm
- Inter-African Medal for the Protection of the Bangui Agreements
- Order of Patriotic Merit, Officer (Burundi)
- Order of the Aztec Eagle, Plaque (Mexico)
- Order of the British Empire (Military version), Honorary Commander
- Puga received every single degree of the Legion of Honor and the National Order of Merit.

Other awards

- GSOF Lifetime Achievement Award, from Global Special Operation Forces Foundation, 2017
