= Henri Bentégeat =

French general

Henri Bentégeat

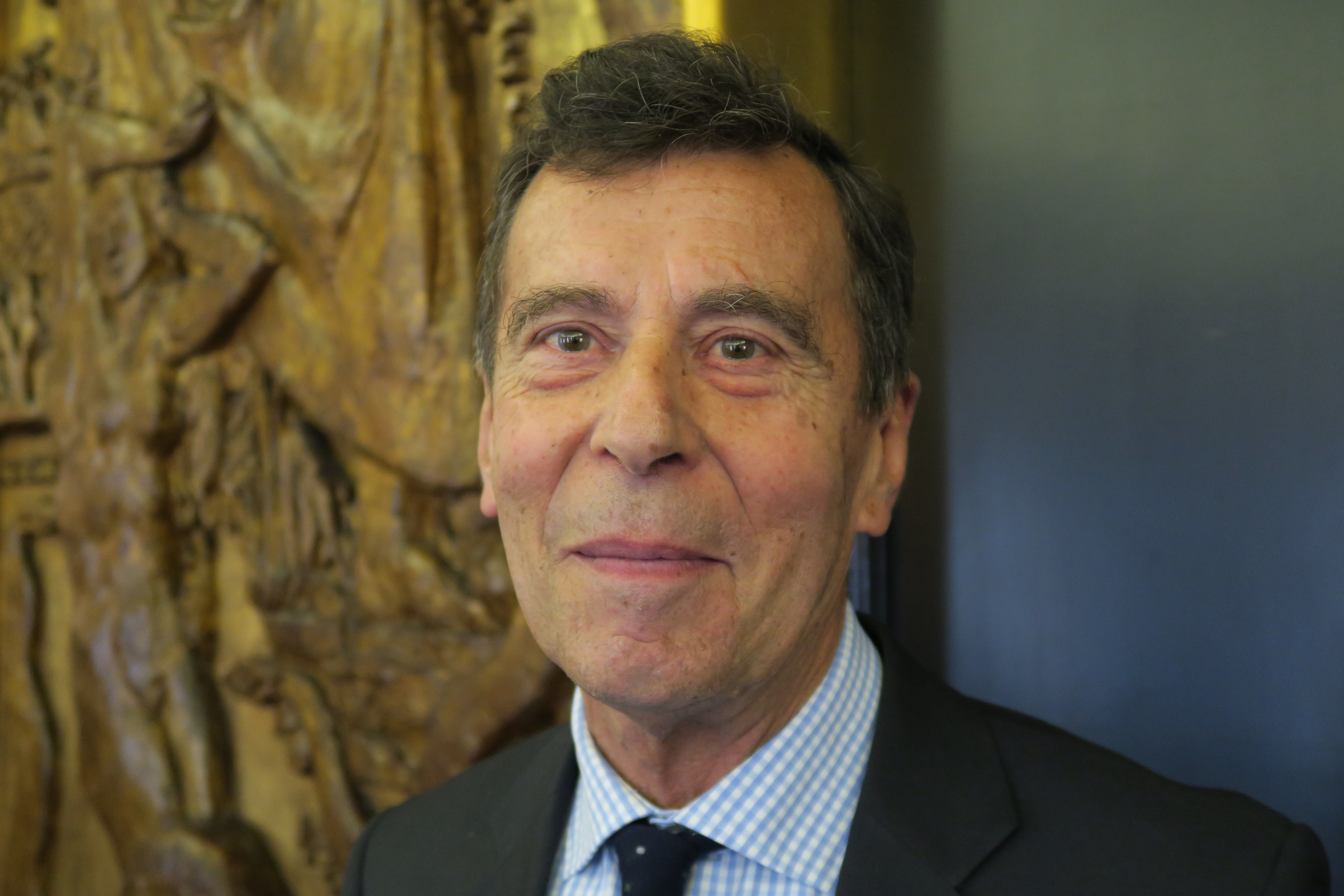
- Henri Bentégeat in November 2016
- Born: 27 May 1946 (age 80); Talence Nouvelle-Aquitaine
- Military career
- Allegiance: France
- Branch: French Army
- Service years: 1966–2009
- Rank: General; Chief of the Military Staff; Chief of the Defence Staff
- Commands: RICM; French Forces - Antilles; French Defense staff
- Awards: Légion d'honneur (Grand Croix); Ordre national du Mérite (Officer); Bundesverdienstkreuz; Legion of Merit

Henri Bentégeat (French: [ɑ̃ʁi bɑ̃teɡa]; born 27 May 1946 in Talence, France) is a French Army general who served first as the Chief of the French Defence Staff between 2002 and 2006 and then as the chairman of the European Union Military Committee between 2006 and 2009.

== Biography ==
Bentégeat graduated from the French military academy École spéciale militaire de Saint-Cyr in 1967 and opted for the Troupes de marine branch. He held various staff and command positions - including several deployments to Senegal, Chad and Central Africa - until he took command of Régiment d'infanterie-chars de marine (RICM), which already was a professional regiment at a time when most of the French Army was still drafted. From 1990 to 1992, he served as Assistant Defence Attaché in Washington, D.C. and from 1996 to 1998 was commander, French armed forces, West Indies (Lesser Antilles). He served as assistant to the Chief of the Military Staff of the President of the Republic from 1993.

Bentégeat was promoted to the rank of Brigade General in 1995 and to Divisional General in 1998, when he became assistant to the director for strategic affairs of the French Ministry of Defence. In April 1999, he was made Chief of the Military Staff of the President of the Republic, was promoted to Général de corps d'armée on 1 September 1999 and to Général d'armée on 4 January 2001. He became Chef d'état-major des armées (Chief of the Defence Staff) in October 2002.

On 6 November 2006, Bentégeat took up the position of chairman of the European Union Military Committee by appointment of the European Council. His term ended on 6 November 2009, when he was succeeded by Håkan Syrén.

Henri Bentegeat's education includes completion of the Junior Staff Course, Staff College in 1985 and of the Advanced Military Studies Course in 1992. He holds a bachelor's degree in history from La Sorbonne University in Paris and is a 1983 graduate from Institut d'Etudes Politiques in Paris.

In April 2023, he was elected to a seat in the Académie des Sciences Morales et Politiques.

He is married and the father of four.

== Promotions ==
Bentégeats promotions:

- 1968 – Lieutenant
- 1974 – Captain
- 1979 – Major (Commandant)
- 1983 – Lieutenant Colonel
- 1988 – Colonel
- 1995 – Brigadier General (Général de brigade)
- 1998 – Major General (Général de division)
- 1999 – Lieutenant General (Général de corps d'armée)
- 2001 – General (Général d'armée)

== Predecessors and successors ==
Military offices
Preceded by Jean-Luc Delaunay	Chief of the Military Staff of the President of the Republic; 27 April 1999–16 October 2002	Succeeded by Jean-Louis Georgelin
Preceded by Jean-Pierre Kelche	Chief of the Defence Staff; 30 October 2002 – 3 October 2006	Succeeded by Jean-Louis Georgelin
Preceded by General Rolando Mosca Moschini	Chairman of the European Union Military Committee; 6 November 2006–6 November 2009	Succeeded by General Håkan Syrén

== Main awards and decorations ==
=== French honours ===
- Gran Cross of the Légion d'honneur (2016)
- Commander of the Ordre national du Mérite
- Overseas Medal

=== Foreign honours ===
- Commander of the Order of Central African recognition (Central African Republic)
- Knight of the Order of Bernardo O'Higgins (Chile)
- Commander of the Order of Merit of the Federal Republic of Germany
- Officier of the Hungarian Order of Merit (Hungary)
- Grand Officer of the Order of Merit of the Italian Republic (Italy)
- Knight of the Order of Merit of the Grand Duchy of Luxembourg
- Grand Officer of the National Order of Madagascar
- Grand Cordon of the Order of Ouissam Alaouite (Morocco)
- Grand Cordon of the Order of Military Merit (Morocco)
- NATO Medal for Kosovo (NATO)
- Nishan-e-Imtiaz (Pakistan)
- Commander of the National Order of the Lion (Senegal)
- Grand Cross – White Decoration of the Cross of Military Merit (Spain)
- Knight of the Order of Military Merit (Syria)
- Grand Officer of the Order of Mono (Togo)
- Commander of the Legion of Merit (USA)

== Publications ==
=== book ===
- Aimer l'Armée - Une passion à Partager, (To love the Army - a passion to be shared). Éditions Dumesnil, Paris 2011 - ISBN 978-2365340014

=== articles ===
- Henri Bentégeat (August 2014). "L'avenir de la guerre" [The future of war]. Revue Esprit.
- Henri Bentégeat (May 2015). "Le pouvoir politique et les responsables militaires" [Political power and military commanders]. Revue des Deux Mondes.
