= Rolando Mosca Moschini =

Italian general

General Rolando Mosca Moschini OMRI OMI VBD OSGM MKE SMCOSG OPMM LOM OMGDL
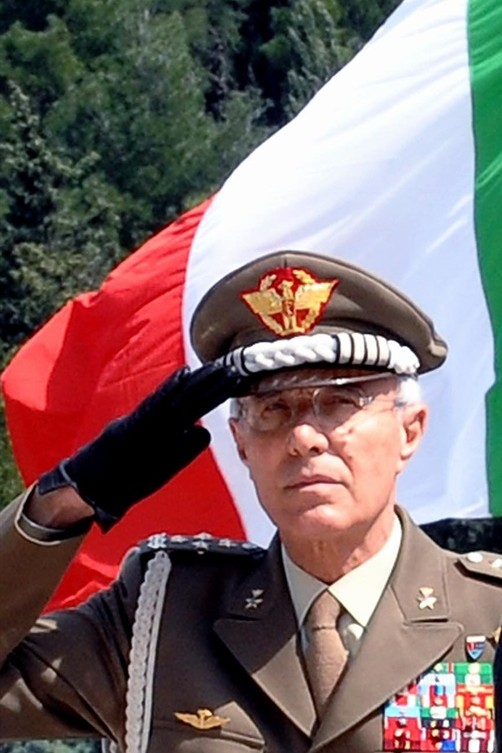

Chief of the Defence Staff
- In office 1 April 2001 – 9 March 2004
- Preceded by: Mario Arpino
- Succeeded by: Giampaolo Di Paola

Commandant General of the Guardia di Finanza
- In office 11 January 1997 – 27 March 2001
- Preceded by: Costantino Berlenghi
- Succeeded by: Alberto Zignani

Personal details
- Born: 9 March 1939 (age 87) Terni, Italy

Military service
- Allegiance: Italy
- Branch/service: Italian Army
- Years of service: 1959 – 2015
- Rank: General

Rolando Mosca Moschini, OMRI, OMI, VBD, OSGM, MKE, SMCOSG, OPMM, LOM, OMGDL (born 9 March 1939) is an Italian army general.

Mosca Moschini started his career as a cadet of the Nunziatella military academy of Naples. He was commissioned as an officer in 1959, and initially served with artillery units of the Italian army. In 1959, he become official of the Italian Army and was enlisted in the "Folgore" and "Mantova" artillery divisions.

Mosca Moschini served as a military attaché at the Embassy of Italy, London from 1980 to 1983, Commandant General of the Guardia di Finanza from January 1997 to March 2001, and as Chief of the Defence Staff from April 2001 to March 2004. In April 2004 he was named Chairman of the European Union Military Committee, an office he held until 7 November 2006, when he was succeeded by Henri Bentégeat.

The following day he flew in Italy to be appointed as military consultant within the general secretary of the Italian President Giorgio Napolitano, remaining in charge until his resignations in 2015. Subsequently, the Italian President Mattarella recalled him to same role. Moschini is also the High Council of Defence's secretary.

== Honours ==
=== Italian ===
- Knight Grand Cross of the Order of Merit of the Italian Republic
- Grand Officer of the Military Order of Italy

=== Foreign ===
- Knight Grand Cross with Star Order of Merit of the Federal Republic of Germany (Germany)
- Knight Grand Cross of the Order of St. Gregory the Great (Holy See)
- Knight Grand Cross of the Order of Merit of the Republic of Hungary (Hungary)
- Knight Grand Cross of the Sacred Military Constantinian Order of Saint George (House of Bourbon)
- Knight Grand Cross of the Order pro merito Melitensi (Sovereign Military Order of Malta)
- Commander of the Legion of Merit (United States)
- Grand Officer of the Order of Merit of the Grand Duchy of Luxembourg (Luxembourg)

Military offices
Preceded by General Gustav Hägglund	Chairman of the European Union Military Committee; 2004-2006	Succeeded by General Henri Bentégeat
