= Jean-Philippe Douin =

French general

Jean-Philippe Douin
- Born: 8 April 1940; Djezar District, French Algeria
- Died: 19 January 2016 (aged 75); Paris, France
- Military career
- Allegiance: (France)
- Branch: French Air Force
- Service years: 1958–1998
- Rank: Général d'Armée Aérienne
- Conflicts: Algerian War; Algiers putsch of 1961

Jean-Philippe Douin (8 April 1940 – 19 January 2016) was a French Air Force general. He was the Chief of Staff of the French Air Force from 1994 to 1995 and Chief of the Defence Staff from 1995 to 1998. There was some controversy surrounding his appointment since, as a Conscript between 1958 and 1959, he had served in a French Marine Light Cavalry/Light Armored Reconnaissance Regiment (Régiment d'infanterie-chars de marine) in Algeria that was accused of committing war crimes during the Algerian War; later, as a young Air Force Lieutenant and Dassault Mirage III fighter pilot in 1961, his unit had taken part in the Algiers Putsch under the command of Air Vice Marashal Jouhaud. For most of his flying career, Douin piloted the Dassault Mirage III and the Dassault Mirage 5, commanding a squadron, wing and fighter group, before becoming the French Air Attaché to Pakistan and Chile. After entering the General Ranks he served variously as a doctrinal specialist in the Air Force Staff & Training Command, the chief of Aerial Intelligence for a Fighter Division, and Commander of a Fighter Division.

Military offices
Preceded by Vincent Lanata	Chief of Staff of the French Air Force; 1 July 1994 – 1 September 1995	Succeeded by Jean Rannou
Preceded by Jacques Lanxade	Chief of the Defence Staff; 9 September 1995 – 29 April 1998	Succeeded by Jean-Pierre Kelche
Political offices
Preceded by Gilbert Forray	Grand Chancellor of the Legion of Honour; 4 June 1998–4 June 2004	Succeeded by Jean-Pierre Kelche
