= Édouard Guillaud =

French admiral (born 1953)

Édouard Guillaud

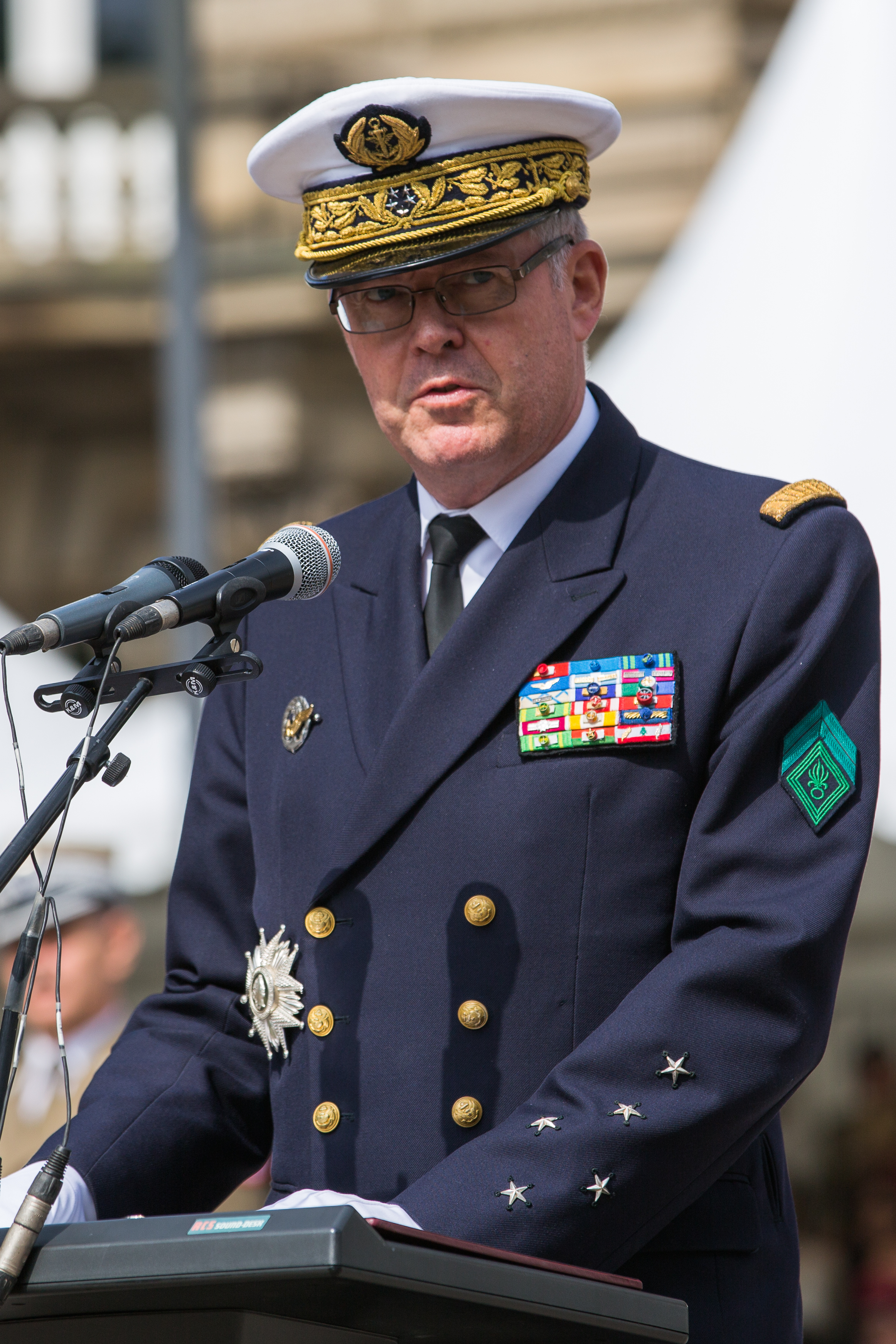
- Admiral Édouard Guillaud, France; 25th Chief of the Defence Staff
- Born: Édouard François Jean-Louis Guillaud; 10 July 1953 (age 72); Paris, France
- Allegiance: France
- Branch: French Navy
- Service years: 1973 – 2014
- Rank: Amiral
- Commands: PA Charles de Gaulle; PA Clemenceau; Maritime prefect Chief of the Military Staff of the President of the Republic; Chief of the Defence Staff
- Conflicts: Lebanese Civil War; Gulf War; Libyan Civil War; Mali War
- Awards: Grand Officer of the National Order of the Legion of Honour Officer of the National Order of Merit Officer of the Order of Maritime Merit

Édouard François Jean-Louis Guillaud (French: [edwaʁ ɡijo]; born 10 July 1953) is a French retired admiral who served as Chief of the Defence Staff from 2010 to 2014. He devoted a significant part of his career to the design of the Charles de Gaulle aircraft carrier, the flagship of the French Navy, and eventually captained it as its first commanding officer at sea. Prior to his appointment at the general staff headquarters of the Armed Forces, Guillaud served as Chief of the Military Staff of the President of the Republic from 2006 to 2010.

== Biography ==
=== Early life ===
Born in 1953 in Paris, Guillaud is the son of journalist Jean-Louis Guillaud (French: Jean-Louis Guillaud), a former president of the Agence France-Presse and TF1. He studied at the Lycée Hector Berlioz in Vincennes and at the Private Lycée Sainte-Geneviève in Versailles.

=== Military career ===
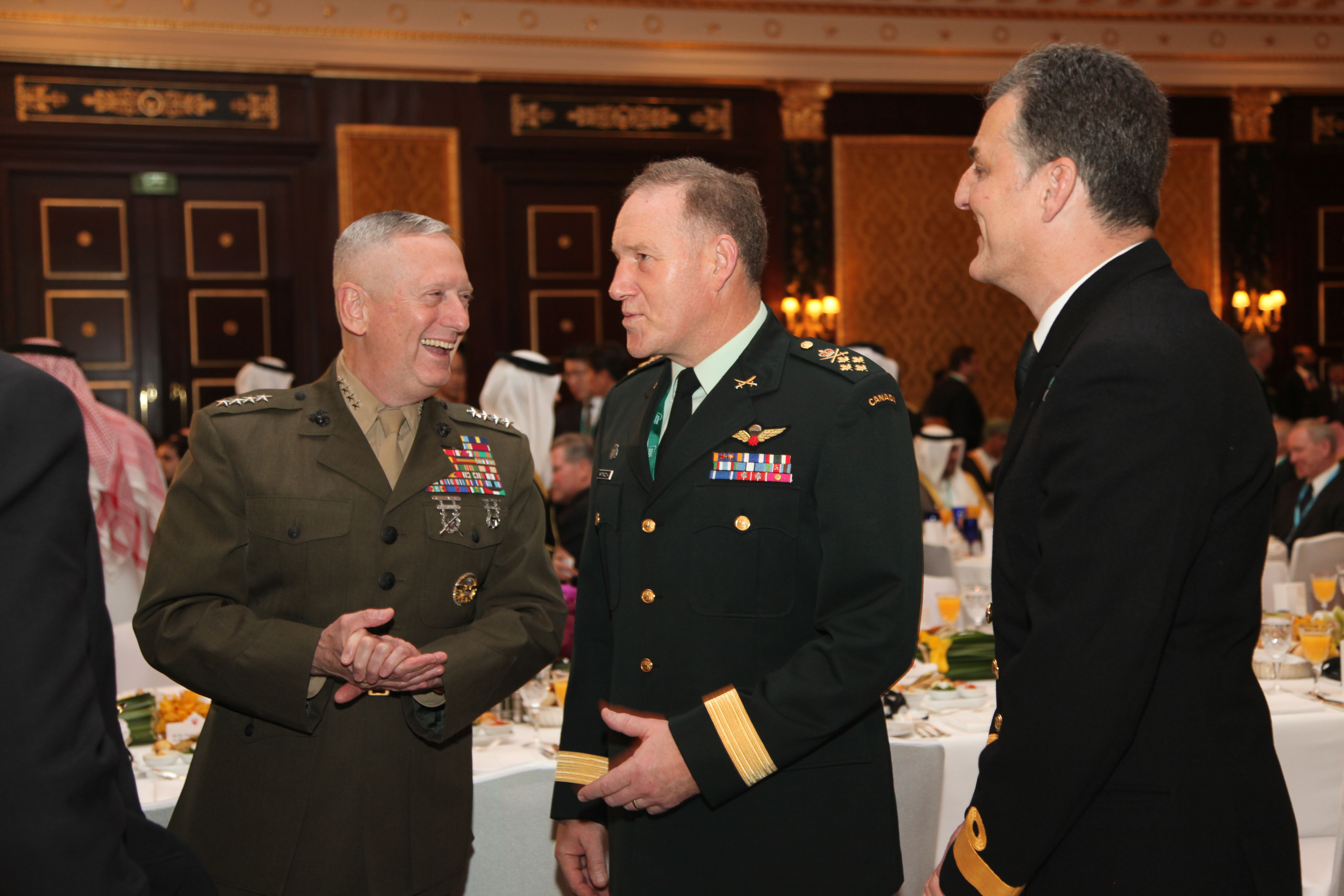
General Guillaud with CENTCOM commander General Jim Mattis and Canadian Chief of the Defence Staff General Walter Natynczyk during the 7th International Institute for Strategic Studies Regional Security Summit on 3 December 2010.

Édouard joined the École Navale in 1973. As an enseigne de vaisseau (vessel ensign), he first served on the patroller La Paimpolaise from 1976 to 1978, monitoring the nuclear trials in Mururoa, French Polynesia. Afterwards, he served consecutively for one year on two French nuclear ballistic missile submarines SNLE L'Indomptable and Le Redoutable, following which he took command in 1979 of the minesweeper Lobelia, for another year until 1980. The next year, he studied for a specialisation in gunnery and missiles.

In the early 1980s, Guillaud was sent in exchange in the United States. As a Lieutenant de Vaisseau (Lieutenant) from 1981 to 1984, he then served as service chief on the aviso Amyot d'Inville and the squadron escorteurs launch missile Du Chayla, then as a service operations chief on the squadron escorteur launch missile Kersaint, cruising off the seas between Iran and Lebanon in 1983.

From 1984 to 1987, he worked on the nuclear aircraft carrier programme, particularly on expert systems in the programming environment of the ship. He was promoted to Capitaine de corvette in 1985.

In 1987 he took command of the BATRAL Dumont d'Urville for one year, taking part in the operations related to the Ouvéa cave hostage taking on Ouvéa, New Caledonia.

Guillaud went on to study at the Superior Naval War School (French: École Supérieure de Guerre Navale, ESGN) and the School of Military Application for Atomic Energy (French: École des Applications Militaires de l'Energie Atomique, EAMEA), rising to Capitaine de frégate in 1989. He specialised in nuclear engineering, obtaining a degree in 1990.

In 1991, with the start of the Gulf War, Guillaud was sent on the Clemenceau, where he served as a Maneuver Officer.

In 1992, he took command of the aviso-escort Enseigne de vaisseau Henry (F749). In 1993, he re-integrated the design team for the nuclear carrier. Guillaud was promoted to Capitaine de vaisseau in 1996. The following year, he took the position of second officer on the Charles De Gaulle, which was then being completed in Brest.

From 1999 to 2001, Guillaud captained the nuclear carrier Charles De Gaulle, supervising carrier de Gaulle's trials and fittings. The next year, he studied at the Centre des hautes études militaires CHEM and at the Institut des hautes études de Défense nationale IHEDN.

==== Admiral ====
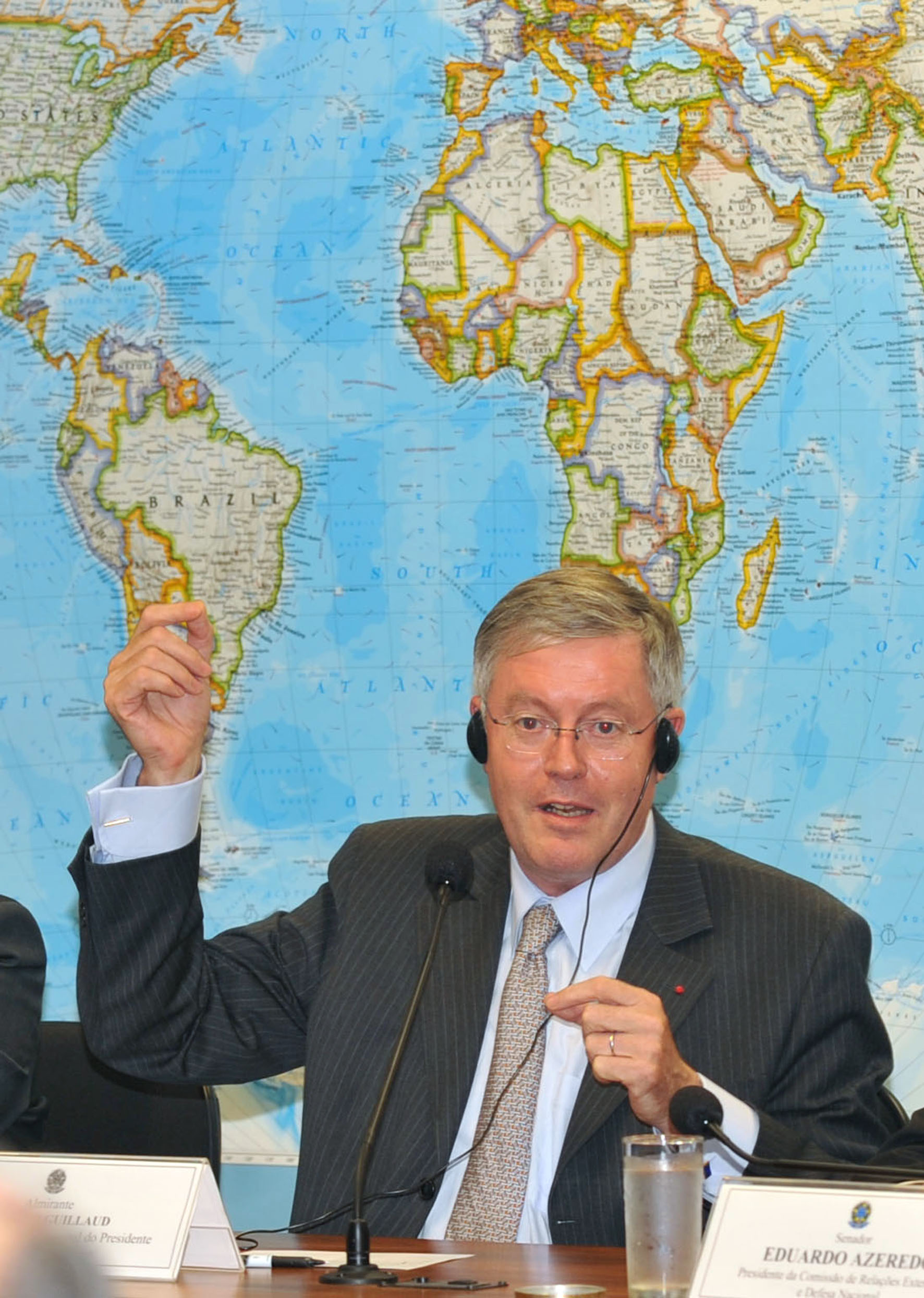
Guillaud in Brazil for negotiations regarding export of Dassault Rafale aircraft to Brazil, 1 October 2009

From 2002 to 2004, he served as the assistant (French: adjoint) chief to the navy of the Chief of the Military Staff of the President of the Republic.

Between 2004 and 2006, Contre-Amiral (Counter-Admiral) Guillaud was préfet maritime for the English Channel and the North Sea. He was promoted to Vice-Amiral (Vice-Admiral) on 1 April 2006. The same year, he was called by Jacques Chirac to take on the position of Chief of the Military Staff of the President of the Republic CEMP-P.R., replacing General Jean-Louis Georgelin; Guillaud took the office on 4 October, and was confirmed in this role in May 2007 after the election of Nicolas Sarkozy. As a Vice-amiral d'escadre (Squadron vice-admiral), he was promoted to Amiral (Admiral) in December 2007.

Guillaud has taken office as chief of the general staff headquarters of the Armies CEMA on 25 February 2010, and is the second Admiral of France to take this post.

During the Libyan Civil War, he commanded the French forces enforcing the Libyan no-fly zone.

In 2013 he commanded the French Forces in the Mali Civil War.

He left active duty service on 14 February 2014 when général Pierre de Villiers succeeded him at head of the armies. He assumed a French armament directorate until 2017.

== Decorations and medals ==
Ribbons	Decorations
	Grand Officer of the Legion of Honour (France, elevated from Officer)
	Officer of the National order of Merit (France)
	Officer of the Ordre du Mérite Maritime
	Médaille de l'Aéronautique
	Médaille d'Outre-Mer with two bars
	Médaille de la Défense nationale échelon bronze with two bars
	Médaille de reconnaissance de la Nation with bar
	Grand Cross of the Order of Rio Branco (Brazil)
Order of Defence Merit	Officer of the Order of Defence Merit (Brazil)
	Grand Officer of the Order of King Abdulaziz al Saud (Saudi Arabia)
	Grand Officer of the Order pro Merito Melitensi (Malta, elevated from Officer)
	Ordre du Lion blanc, 2ième classe (République tchèque)
	Grand Officer of the Order of Naval Merit (Brazil)
	Commander of the Legion of Merit
	Commander of the Order of Isabella the Catholic (Spain)
	Grand Cross of the Order of Merit of the Republic of Poland
	Commander of the National Order of Merit (Mauritania)
	National Order of Burkina Faso, Commander
	Order of Merit, First Class (Lebanon), 1983
	Order of the British Empire, Honorary Knight Commander (Military), 2014
	National Order of Mali, Grand Officer
	National Order of the Ivory Coast, Commander

- Honorary Corporal of the French Foreign Legion.

== See also ==
- Benoit Puga
- List of Escorteurs of the French Navy
- List of submarines of France
- Christophe Prazuck
- Bernard Rogel
- Pierre-François Forissier

== Sources and references ==
Military offices
Preceded by Jean-Louis Georgelin	Chief of the Military Staff of the President of the Republic; 4 October 2006 – 4 March 2010	Succeeded by Benoît Puga
Preceded by Jean-Louis Georgelin	Chief of the Defence Staff; 25 February 2010 – 14 February 2014	Succeeded by Pierre de Villiers
