= François Lecointre =

French Army general (born 1962)

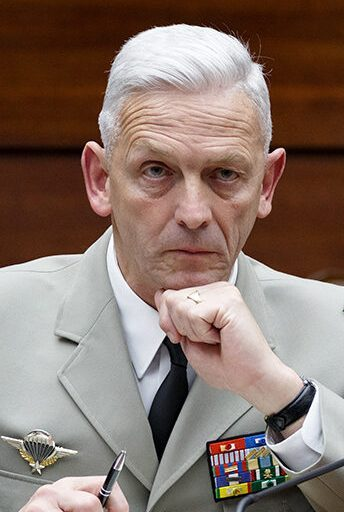
- General Lecointre in 2020

Chief of the Defence Staff
- In office 20 July 2017 – 21 July 2021
- Preceded by: Pierre de Villiers
- Succeeded by: Thierry Burkhard

Head of the Prime Minister's military cabinet
- In office 1 September 2016 – 20 July 2017
- Prime Minister: Manuel Valls; Bernard Cazeneuve; Édouard Philippe
- Preceded by: Olivier Taprest
- Succeeded by: Benoît Durieux

Personal details
- Born: François Gérard Marie Lecointre; 6 February 1962 (age 64) Cherbourg, France
- Children: 4
- Parents: Yves Lecointre (father); Françoise de Roffignac (mother)
- Education: Prytanée National Militaire; École Spéciale Militaire; École de l'Infanterie

Military service
- Allegiance: France
- Branch/service: French Army: Marine Troops
- Years of service: 1984 – 2021
- Rank: Army general
- Unit: List: 3rd Marine Infantry Regiment; 5th Overseas Interarms Regiment
- Commands: List: 3rd Marine Infantry Regiment; 9th Marine Infantry Brigade; EUTM Mali
- Battles/wars: List: Gulf War; Opération Daguet Djiboutian Civil War; Opération Iskoutir Somali Civil War; Opération Oryx Rwandan Civil War; Opération Turquoise Bosnian Civil War; Battle of Vrbanja Bridge First Ivorian Civil War; Opération Licorne Second Ivorian Civil War Mali Civil War

François Gérard Marie Lecointre (French pronunciation: [fʁɑ̃swa ʒeʁaʁ maʁi ləkwɛ̃tʁ]; born 6 February 1962) is a retired French Army general who has served as Grand Chancellor of the Order of the Legion of Honour since 1 February 2023. He previously served as Chief of the Defence Staff between 2017 and 2021.

The son of a naval officer, Lecointre joined the French Army in 1984. As a captain, with Lieutenant Bruno Heluin (platoon leader) as the company commanding officer, he led an assault at the Battle of Vrbanja Bridge in 1995 that was the latest fixed bayonet charge of the French Armed Forces.

== Biography ==
François Lecointre was born on 6 February 1962 in Cherbourg into a military family. His father, Yves Urbain Marie Lecointre (5 April 1932 – 17 July 1985), was a French naval officer and submariner who served as the commandant of the ballistic missile submarine SNLE Le Redoutable. One of his grandfathers, an officer during World War II, was a prisoner in Germany and took part in the Liberation of France. One of his uncles, Hélie de Roffignac, was a cavalry officer who died in Algeria at the age of 23. Another one of his uncles, Patrick Lecointre, a vice admiral, successively served as the commander of the frigate De Grasse (1987-1988), chief of the military staff of the Prime Minister (1991-1994), and commander of the Naval Action Force (1994-1996).

A practicing Catholic, François Lecointre has been married since 1986 and has four daughters.

== Military career ==
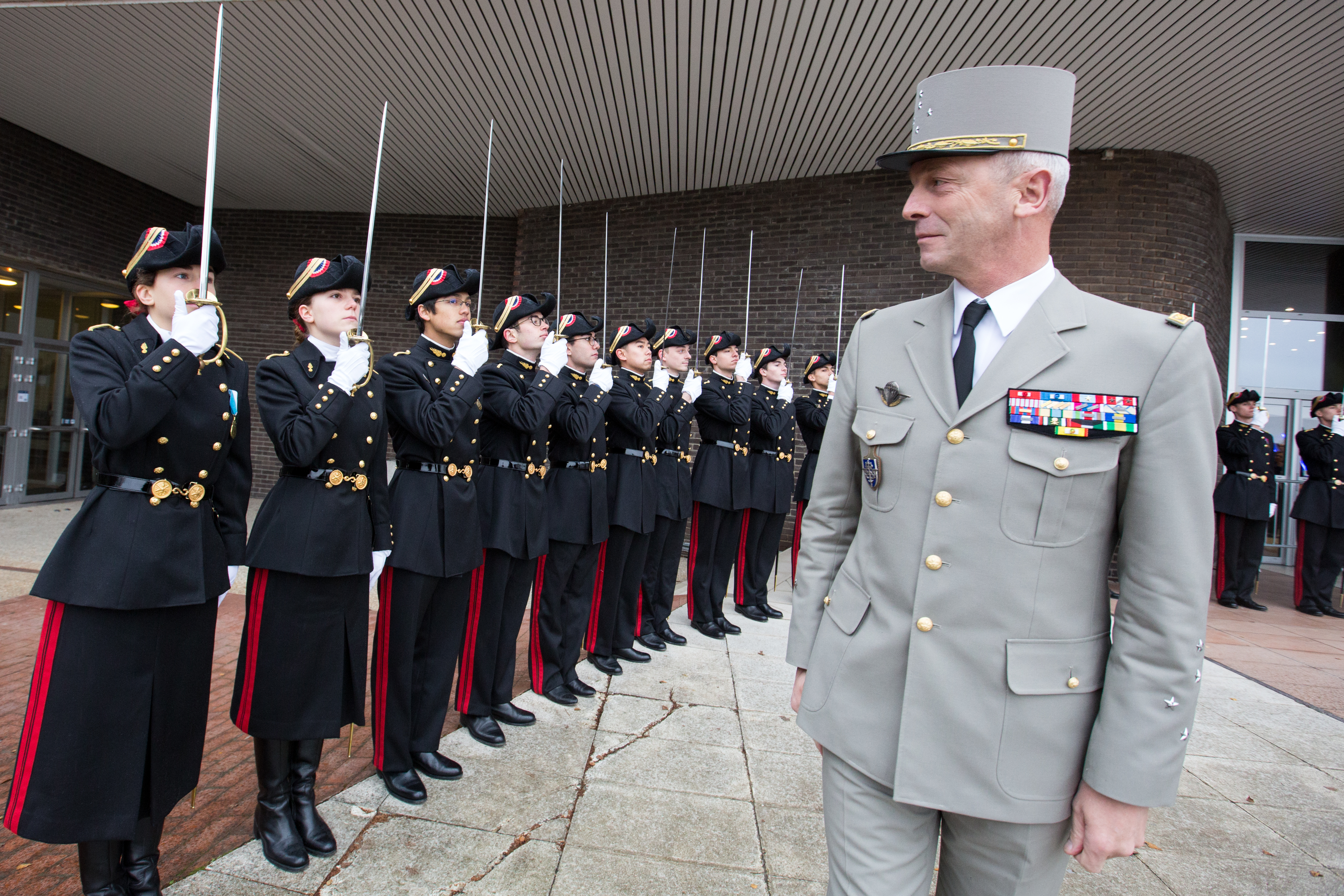
General Lecointre at the École Polytechnique

Lecointre attended preparatory classes at the Prytanée National Militaire in La Flèche. He subsequently studied at the École spéciale militaire de Saint-Cyr (Promotion Général Monclar) from 1984 to 1987 and then at the Infantry School from 1987 to 1988.

Lecointre joined the 3rd Marine Infantry Regiment, where he served from 1988 to 1991. Lecointre was promoted from lieutenant to captain in the marine infantry on 1 July 1991.

From 1993 to 1996, he was a combat company commander of the 3rd Marine Infantry Regiment in Vannes. As a captain, Lecointre was involved in the Opération Turquoise in 1994 in Rwanda. He commanded the 1st company of the 3rd Marine Infantry Regiment (3^{e} RIMa) in the Groupement Nord Turquoise. Lecointre was also engaged with French forces under the command of the United Nations Protection Force (UNPROFOR) during the Bosnian War. Under the orders of General Hervé Gobilliard and Colonel Erik Sandahl, Lecointre and Lieutenant Bruno Heluin led a bayonet charge to win the Battle of Vrbanja Bridge on 27 May 1995. According to journalist Jean Guisnel, the episode turned the tide of the war and led to victory in Bosnia.

From 1996 to 1999, Lecointre was an instructor at the École spéciale militaire de Saint-Cyr in Coëtquidan, Morbihan where he trained student officers in military tactics. From 1999 to 2001, he was a trainee officer at the Joint Defense College (now École Militaire). He then served in the office of the Chief of Staff of the French Army in Paris at the crops bureau of system conception forces.

From 2005 to 2007, Colonel Lecointre was the commanding officer of the 3rd Marine Infantry Regiment in Vannes.

From 2007 to 2008, he studied at the Center of High Military Studies (CHEM) and was an auditor at the Institut des hautes études de défense nationale (IHEDN) in Paris.

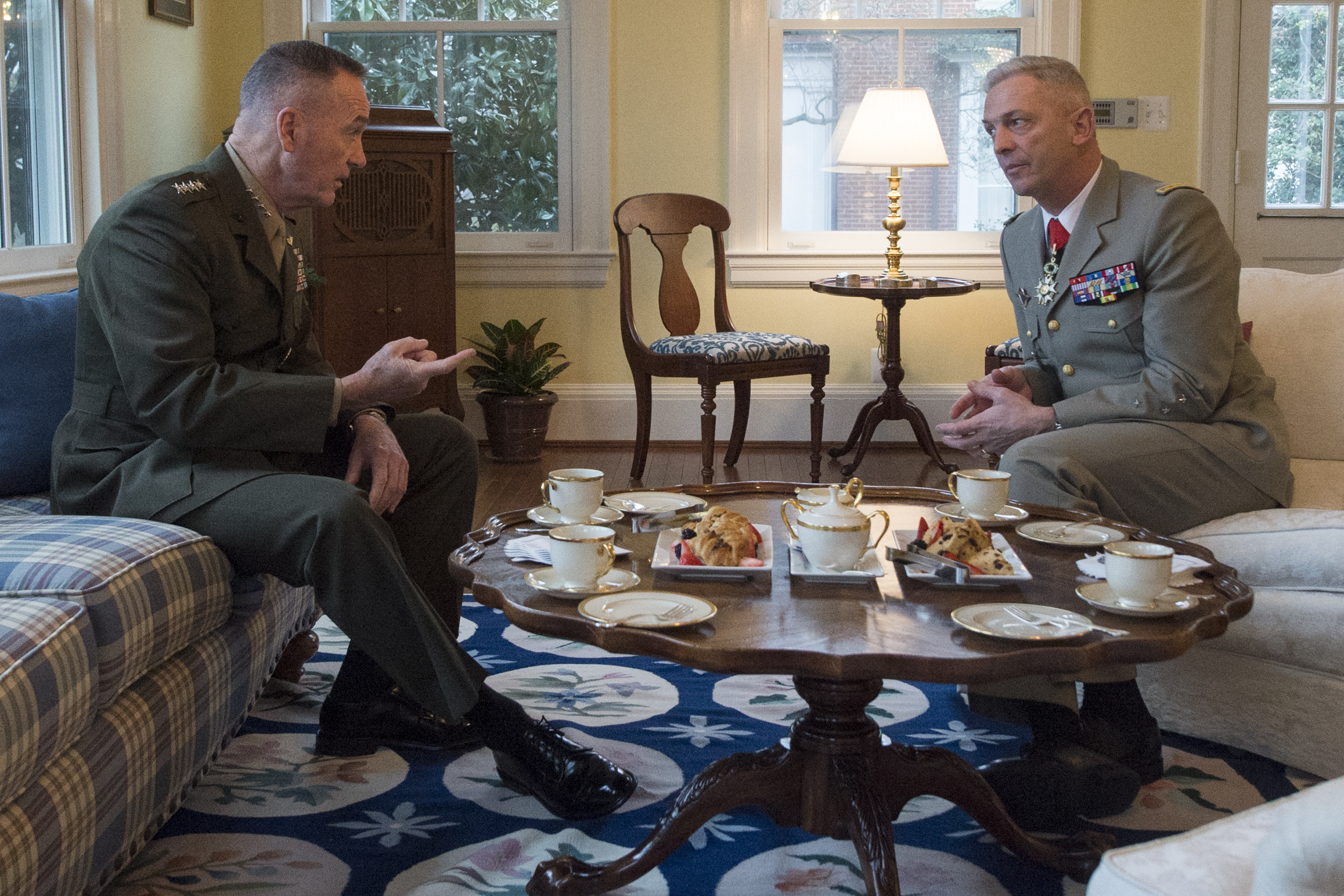
Joseph Dunford and François Lecointre during his first official visit in Washington, DC in 2018

He was promoted to brigade general on 1 August 2011; he was in command of the 9th Marine Infantry Brigade in Poitiers until 2013. Lecointre was later appointed as commander of the European Union Training Mission in Mali from January to July 2013.

He rejoined the general staff headquarters of the French Army as a chargé de mission, becoming deputy-chief of the defence staff for "performance-synthèse" from 2014 to 2016. Lecointre was promoted to division general on 1 January 2015.

Head of the Prime Minister's military cabinet from August 2016, Lecointre was elevated by a decree of President François Hollande from the first section of general officers to the rank of corps general on 1 March 2017.

On 20 July 2017, Lecointre was appointed Chief of the Defence Staff by President Emmanuel Macron, following the resignation of General Pierre de Villiers; he was promoted to the rank of Général d'armée. General Lecointre made his first official visit to the United States in February 2018, where he met with his American counterpart Joseph Dunford to discuss the ongoing War against the Islamic State and progress on the G5 Sahel.

On 21 July 2021, Lecointre retired from active service and was succeeded by General Thierry Burkhard as Chief of Defence Staff. After a brief period outside the public eye, he was made Grand Cross and Grand Chancellor of the Order of the Legion of Honour per 1 February 2023, succeeding fellow retired General Benoît Puga.

== Military ranks ==
Cadet (Note: First year of ESM Saint-Cyr.)	Aspirant (Note: Second year of ESM Saint-Cyr.)	Second lieutenant (Note: Third year of ESM Saint-Cyr.)	Lieutenant (Note: Upon leaving ESM Saint-Cyr.)	Captain	Battalion chief
1984	1985	1 August 1986	1 August 1987	1 August 1991	1 December 1996
Lieutenant colonel	Colonel	Brigade general	Division general	Corps general	Army general
1 December 2000	1 December 2003	1 August 2011	1 January 2015	1 March 2017	20 July 2017

== Honours and decorations ==
Honours and decorations
National honours
Ribbon bar	Name	Date	Source
	Grand Cross of the National Order of the Legion of Honour	18 January 2023	
	Grand Officer of the National Order of the Legion of Honour	2 July 2018	
	Commander of the National Order of the Legion of Honour	28 August 2014	
	Officer of the National Order of the Legion of Honour	14 July 2006	
	Knight of the National Order of the Legion of Honour	23 June 1995	
	Grand Cross of the National Order of Merit	18 January 2023	
	Commander of the National Order of Merit	5 May 2011	
	Officer of the National Order of Merit	10 December 2002	
	Commander of the Order of Academic Palms	2023	
	Commander of the Ordre des Arts et des Lettres	2023	
Military decorations
Ribbon bar	Name		Source
	War Cross for foreign operational theatres - Silver-gilt star (corps level citation)		-
	Cross for Military Valour - Bronze palm and two bronze stars (army level citation, brigade level citation and regiment level citation)		-
	Combatant's Cross		-
	Overseas Medal - Four clasps		-
	National Defence Medal - Silver grade with two clasps		-
	Medal of the Nation's Gratitude - One clasp		-
	French commemorative medal - One clasp		-
	United Nations Medal - UNOSOM II		-
	United Nations Medal - UNPROFOR, SARAJEVO clasp		-
	CSDP EUTM Mali Operations Medal - EUTM Mali clasp		-
	CSDP EUTM Mali Staff Medal - EUTM Mali clasp		-
Foreign honours
Ribbon bar	Name	Country	Source
	Kuwait Liberation Medal	Saudi Arabia	-
	Kuwait Liberation Medal	Kuwait	-
	Grand Cordon of the Order of Military Merit (Morocco)	Morocco	-
	Gran Cross of the Medalha de Mérito Militar	Portugal	
	Gold Grade of the Military Valor Medal	Portugal	
ribbon bar	Gold and Silver Star of the Order of the Rising Sun	Japan	-
	Medal of Gratitude of the Armed Forces	Gabon	
	Commander of the National Order of Mali	Mali	
	Commander of the National Order of the Lion	Senegal	
	Commander of the National Order of Chad	Chad	
	Polish Medal of the 100th Anniversary of the establishment of the General Staff of the Polish Armed Forces	Poland	
	Commander of the Legion of Merit	United States	-
	Grand Officer of the Order of Merit of the Italian Republic	Italy	-
Badges
Insignia	Name		
	French Parachutist Badge		
	Chief of the Defence Staff Badge		

== Publications ==
- François Lecointre (dir.), Le soldat : XXe – XXIe siècle, Gallimard, coll. « Folio Histoire », 2018. With a foreword by French historian Jean-Pierre Rioux. This book is a collection of articles published in the French review of military studies : Inflexions - Civils et militaires : pouvoir dire, of which general Lecointre was a publishing director in 2015–2017.
- Entre guerres, Gallimard, 2024.

== See also ==
- Hervé Charpentier
- Pierre de Villiers
- Battle of Vrbanja Bridge

Military offices
Preceded by Pierre de Villiers	Chief of the Defence Staff; 20 July 2017 – 21 July 2021	Succeeded by Thierry Burkhard
