= Direction générale de la Gendarmerie Nationale =

The Direction Générale de la Gendarmerie nationale (French pronunciation: [diʁɛksjɔ̃ ʒeneʁal də la ʒɑ̃daʁməʁi nɑsjɔnal]; transl. General Directorate of the National Gendarmerie; DGGN) is the department of Interior Ministry (France) with responsibility for operational management of the National Gendarmerie in coordination with the Chef d'État-Major des Armées (CEMA).

== Mission and responsibilities ==
The DGGN administrative responsibilities cover:

- Operations
- Personnel
- Logistics
- Finance

== Organisation ==
The DGGN is headed by the Director General of the National Gendarmerie, who is nominated by the Interior minister and can be:

- General in the National Gendarmerie
- A Magistrate
- Civil Servant (Grade A3 and above)

The DGGN shares responsibilities with the DGPN (Directorate-General of the National Police) in the following areas:

- Directorate General of International Cooperation
- The domestic security Technology and Information systems service

In addition since 2014 a further department is under the joint control of the DGGN, DGPN and the DGSCGC (Directorate-General for Civil Protection and Crises);

- The domestic security Purchasing and logistics service.

== See also ==
- French National Police
- Direction Régionale de Police Judiciaire de Paris
