= Jean-Pierre Kelche =

French general

- Born: 19 January 1942 (age 84); Mâcon, France
- Military career
- Allegiance: France
- Branch: French Army
- Service years: 1961–2002
- Rank: Army General
- Unit: French Armed Forces
- Commands: Chef d'état-major des armées, Antilles-Guyana Staff, 5th Overseas Combined Arms Regiment

Jean-Pierre Kelche is a soldier of the French Armed Forces who served as Chief of Staff of the Armed Forces from 9 April 1998 until 30 October 2002.

Jean-Pierre Kelche, a general of the army was born 19 January 1942 in Mâcon, France, his family are origin of Lorraine. They moved with both of his family to Saint-Cyr in 1961 and later joined the Navy infantry.

He graduated from Ecole Supérieure de Guerre in 1979 after spending about 20 year as submariner engineer before changing to army of which was after attending the Ecole Supérieure, he participated Iran-Iraq conflict. At young age, he served in the Côte d'Ivoire on French Operations and commanded a unit in Djibouti in 1973, he rose to be the senior commander in the Antilles-Guyana Staff between 1979 until 1981 of which he commands the 5th Overseas Combined Arms Regiment in Djibouti to 1987.

== Commands ==
He was deployed to 5th Armored Division in Germany to which he was the deputy general commanding officer in 1991, he was once in charge of updating and the design of the defence tool to which one was the design office of the army staff in 1985 as the head of Doctrine before he was the chief of staff to 1991. He became the head of Army Staff HQ form 1992 until in 1995 of which he was the Head of the Prime Minister's military cabinet until he was made the major general of the army staff in 1996 to 1998, he rose up in the Defence Forces Staff office as it direct subordinate to when he was made the Chief of Staff of the Defence in April 1998.

=== Post-military ===
He later became the Head of French Military Intelligence in 2016, a place which Vice-Admiral Jean Casabianca was heading before appointed to another position.

== Decorations ==
- Grand Officer of the Legion of Honor
- Officer of the National Order of Merit
- Cross of the Legion of Honor

== Family ==
He is married with two children.

Military offices
Preceded by Jean Casabianca	Head of French Military Intelligence; August 2016	Succeeded by incumbent
Preceded by Jean-Philippe Douin	Chief of the Defence Staff; 9 April 1998 – 30 October 2002	Succeeded by Henri Bentégeat
