= Chief of the Defence Staff (France) =

Commander of French Armed Forces

- Chef d'état-major des armées (French)
- Insignia

- Marque

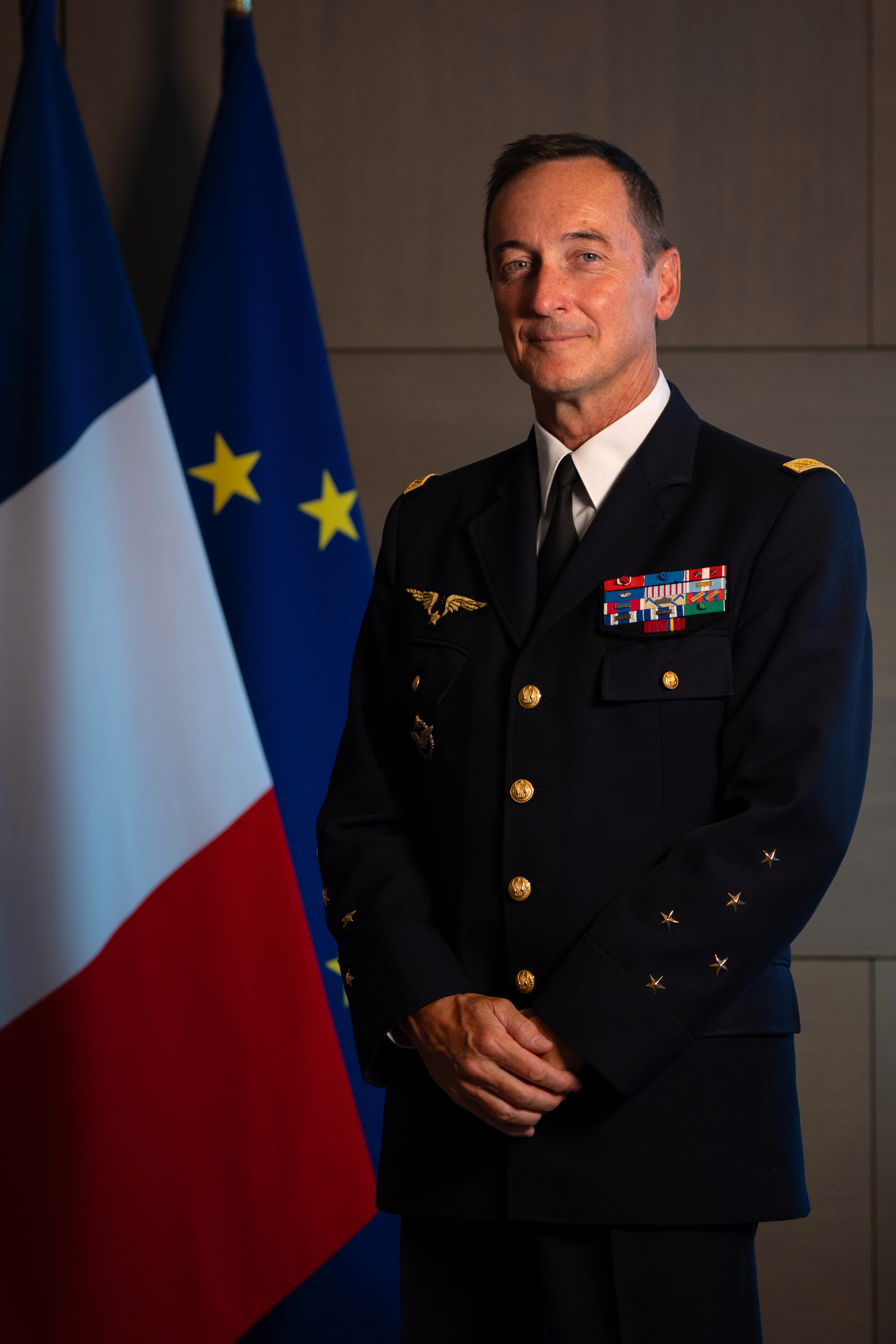
- Incumbent; Général d'armée aérienne Fabien Mandon since 1 September 2025
- Ministry of the Armed Forces
- Type: Chief of defence; Chief of staff
- Abbreviation: C.E.M.A.
- Member of: Chiefs of Staff Committee
- Reports to: Minister of the Armed Forces
- Seat: Hexagone Balard, Paris
- Appointer: President of the Republic; requires the Prime Minister's countersignature
- Constituting instrument: Decree 1982–38; Decree 2005–520; Decree 2009–869; Decree 2013–816
- Formation: 28 April 1948; 78 years ago
- First holder: Charles Léchères
- Deputy: Major General of the Defence Staff
- Website: Official website

The Chief of the Defence Staff (French: Chef d'État-Major des Armées, CEMA; lit. 'Chief of Staff of the Armies') is the military head of the Armed Forces of the French Republic, overseeing all military operations (under reserve of the particular dispositions relative to nuclear deterrence). They are responsible to the Minister of the Armed Forces and their deputy is the Major General of the Defence Staff. Since the 1950s, the office has been held only by four-star generals (OF–9), either from the Army, the Navy, or the Air and Space Force. The current Chief is General Fabien Mandon, who took the position on 1 September 2025.

== History ==
=== Commander-in-Chief of the Armies ===
While non-official, the term Generalissimo or « (French: Généralissime) » was employed since 1914 to designate the individual who in reality was Commander-in-Chief of the armies of the North and North-East « (French: Commandant en Chef des Armées du Nord et du Nord-Est) ». The term would be made official in 1915 when Joffre was also given command over the Salonika front (a degree of authority not enjoyed by his successors). The rank and post was successively occupied by three generals during World War I: Joseph Joffre, who occupied the rank and functions from August 1914 without bearing the official title, then Robert Nivelle and Philippe Pétain.

Général Ferdinand Foch was the Assistant Commander-in-Chief of the Northern Zone under Joseph Joffre in autumn 1914; this role later crystallised into command of French Army Group North, a position which Foch held until December 1916. Subsequently, Foch became Supreme Allied Commander on the Western Front with the title Généralissime in 1918 then was designated as « Commandant en Chef des Armées Alliées » (English:Commander-in-Chief of Allied Forces) starting 14 May 1918. Foch was promoted to Marshal of France prior the planning of the offensive that led to the Armistice of 11 November 1918. Following the armistice, Marshal Ferdinand Foch was elevated to the dignity of the Marshal of Great Britain and Poland.

=== Chief of Staff of National Defence ===
Toward the end of the Second World War, Charles de Gaulle who was Commander-in-Chief of the Free French Forces was assisted by a Staff of National Defence. It was headed by a Chief of Staff who had authority over all armed forces. This was the first time that a joint staff of the French armed forces was created.

However the Chiefs of the Army, of the Navy and of the Air Force were opposed to this office after the war as they fear they would lose their independence of action. This opposition was eventually hushed up and the position of Chief of Staff of the Armies (under various other names until 1962) was created on 28 April 1948.

== Functions ==
=== Responsibilities ===
The CEMA assists the Minister of the Armed Forces in its capacity attributions to make use of the various required forces and their general organisation. They are consulted on direction to be given to planning and programming work and may be charged by the Minister with any study concerning the armies. The Chief of Staff is responsible for coordinating the requirements of the forces in support of joint services. The CEMA, in virtue of decree dispositions of 15 July 2009, under the authority of the President of the French Republic, the French government, and under the reserve of the particular dispositions relative to nuclear deterrence, is responsible for the use of forces and commandment of all military operations. The CEMA is the military counselor of the government.

They bring together the proposals of the Delegate General of Armaments (DGA), the Chiefs of Staff of each army, and the directors of joint services in the areas of planning and programming. After consulting the DGA on technical and industrial possibilities, they shall report to the Minister on all the work and shall propose to them the measures necessary to ensure their consistency with regard to employment and their accounting with the foreseeable financial resources, as assessed by the Secretary General for Administration (SGA), and present a draft decision.

Their responsibilities consist of:

- The conduct of operations: plans of use, general articulation of forces, distribution of operational means between theatre commanders (over whom he has full authority)
- The joint service organizations and the general organization of the armed forces: oversees the coherence of the armed forces organisation
- The expression of the need in material of human resources of the armed forces, the joint institutions, and the definition of the ensemble format of the armed forces. Planning and programming of military capacities. Oversees in effect of coherence in means of the armed forces and participates to the preparation and various executions of associated military and defence budgets.
- The preparation and condition assignments of recruiting in the armed forces: is in check of forces aptitude in missions completion and has a permanent right of inspection over these forces.
- Support of the armed forces: determines the general organizations and objectives, assures the operational maintenance in condition of all equipments and determines the joint needs of various material infrastructures and that of the armed forces while verifying status of operability
- The intelligence assessment of military interest: ensures the general research direction and exploitation of the military intelligence
- International military relations: directs French foreign military missions in foreign theatres, organizes the participation of the armed forces in regards to military cooperations, following international mandated negotiations and represents France at the various military committees of international organizations.

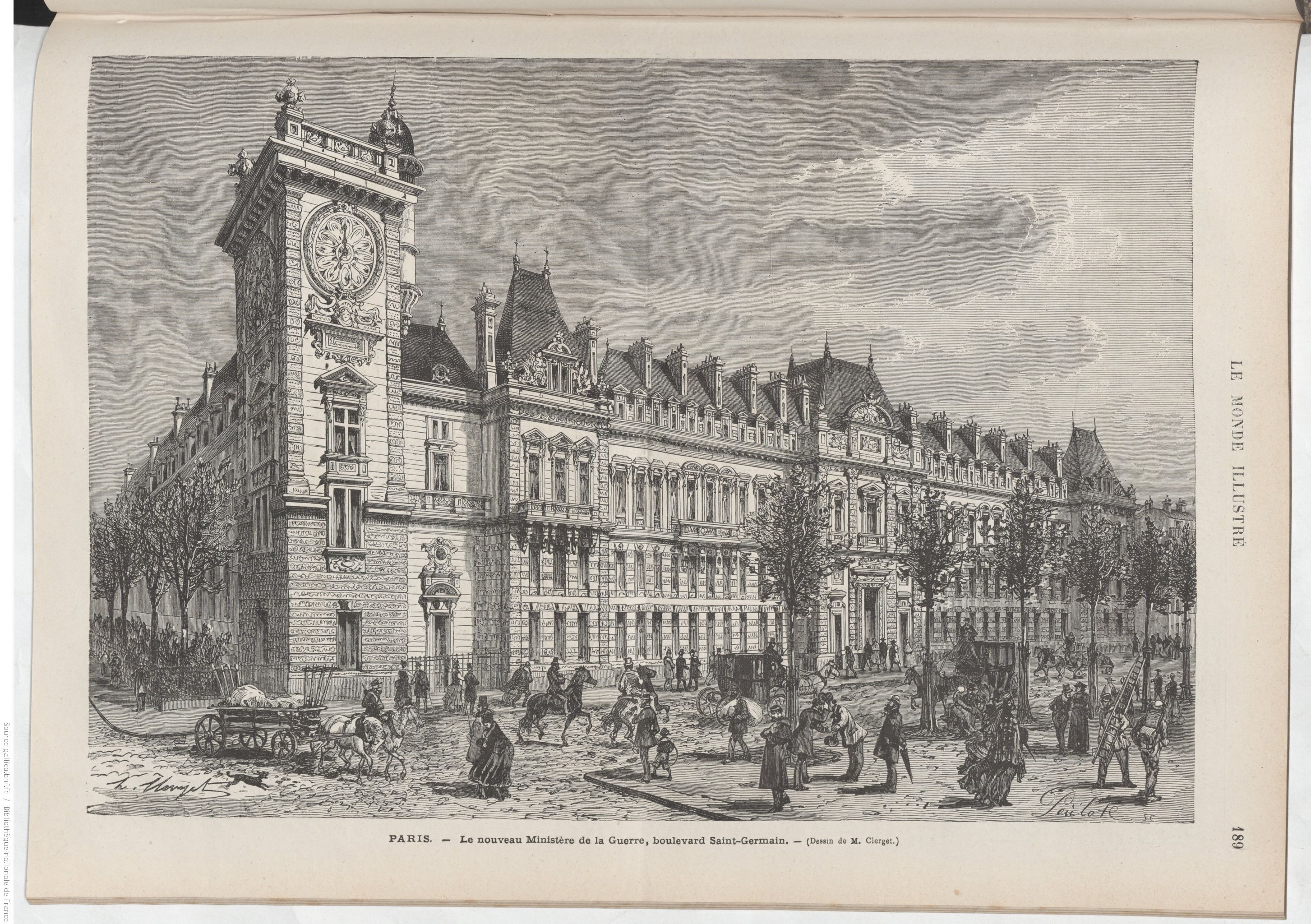
The headquarters of the Staff of the Armies between 1890 and 2015.

=== Authority ===
The Chief of Staff of the Armies has authority over the:

- Chief of Staff of the Army
- Chief of Staff of the Air and Space Force
- Chief of Staff of the Navy

These four Chiefs constitute the Chiefs of Staff Committee, chaired by the Minister. The CEMA is assisted by a Major General of the Defence Staff, a senior ranked officer of the French Armed Forces, who will deputize if needed.

Additionally, directly under the CEMA authority are:

- the General Staff of the Armies (État-Major des Armées, EMA)
- the Inspectorate of the Armies (Inspection des Armées, IDA)
- the superior commanders in the overseas departments, the commanders in foreign areas (COMSUP and COMFOR), the general officers of the defence and security areas (OGZDS) and the departmental military delegates (DMD)
- Joint service institutions:
  - Directorate of Military Intelligence (Direction du Renseignement Militaire, DRM)
  - Special Operations Command (Commandement des Opérations Spéciales, COS)
  - Joint Defence Staff of Strength and Training (État-Major Interarmées de Force et d'Entraînement, EMIA-FE)
  - Central Directorate of the Health Service of the Armies (Direction Centrale du Service de Santé des Armées, DCSSA)
  - Central Directorate of the Fuel Service of the Armies (Direction Centrale du Service des Essences des Armées, DCSEA)
  - Joint Directorate of Infrastructure Networks and Information Systems (Direction Interarmées des Réseaux d'Infrastructures et des Systèmes d'Information, DIRISI)
  - Central Directorate of the Commissariat Service of the Armies (Direction Centrale du Service du Commissariat des Armées, DCSCA)
  - Joint Ammunitions Service (Service Interarmées des Munitions, SIMu)
  - Directorate of Superior Military Education (Direction de l'Enseignement Militaire Supérieur, DEMS)

== Name of the office ==
The office took various names during its history:

- President of the Committee of the Chiefs of the General Staffs of the Armed Forces (1948–1950)
- President of the Committee of the Chiefs of the Combined Staff of the Armed Forces (1950–1953)
- Chief of the General Staff of the Armed Forces (1953–1958)
- Chief of the General Staff of the Armies (1958–1961)
- Chief of the Joint Staff (1961–1962)
- Chief of Staff of the Armies (1962 – )

== List of chiefs ==
=== Provisional Government ===
| No. | Portrait | Rank & Name | Term | | | Branch | Minister | Commander-in-Chief | Ref. (Note: Upper references are the official decree of nomination in French. Lower references are press articles in English.) |
| No. | Portrait | Rank & Name | Took office | Left office | Duration | Branch | Minister | Commander-in-Chief | Ref. |
|---|---|---|---|---|---|---|---|---|---|
| (Note: Chief of Staff of National Defence) | | Army general Antoine Béthouart | 31 October 1943 | 13 August 1944 | 286 days | Army | André Diethelm | Charles de Gaulle | - |
| | | Army general Alphonse Juin | 13 August 1944 | 15 May 1947 | 2 years, 275 days | Army | André Diethelm; Edmond Michelet | Charles de Gaulle | - |
| | | Army general Alphonse Juin | 13 August 1944 | 15 May 1947 | 2 years, 275 days | Army | André Diethelm; Edmond Michelet | Félix Gouin; Georges Bidault; Vincent Auriol | - |

=== Fourth Republic ===
| No. | Portrait | Rank & Name | Term | | | Branch | Minister | Commander-in-Chief | Ref. |
| No. | Portrait | Rank & Name | Took office | Left office | Duration | Branch | Minister | Commander-in-Chief | Ref. |
|---|---|---|---|---|---|---|---|---|---|
Office established
| 1 | | Air corps general Charles Léchères | 29 April 1948 | 25 January 1951 | 2 years, 271 days | Air Force | Pierre-Henri Teitgen; René Mayer [...] Georges Bidault; René Pleven | Vincent Auriol | - |
| 2 | | Army general Alphonse Juin | 25 January 1951 | 19 August 1953 | 2 years, 206 days | Army | René Pleven | Vincent Auriol | - |
| 3 | | Army general Paul Ély | 19 August 1953 | 4 June 1954 | 289 days | Army | René Pleven; Marie-Pierre Kœnig | Vincent Auriol | |
| 3 | | Army general Paul Ély | 19 August 1953 | 4 June 1954 | 289 days | Army | René Pleven; Marie-Pierre Kœnig | René Coty | |
| 4 | | Army general Augustin Guillaume | 4 June 1954 | 2 March 1956 | 1 year, 272 days | Army | Marie-Pierre Kœnig; Emmanuel Temple [...] Pierre Billotte; Maurice Bourgès-Maunoury | René Coty | - |
| 5 | | Army general Paul Ély | 2 March 1956 | 18 May 1958 | 2 years, 77 days | Army | Maurice Bourgès-Maunoury; André Morice; Jacques Chaban-Delmas; Pierre de Chevigné | René Coty | - |
| 6 | | Army general Henri Lorillot | 18 May 1958 | 10 June 1958 | 23 days | Army | Pierre de Chevigné; Charles de Gaulle | René Coty | - |

=== Fifth Republic ===
| No. | Portrait | Rank & Name | Term | | | Branch | Minister | Commander-in-Chief | Ref. |
| No. | Portrait | Rank & Name | Took office | Left office | Duration | Branch | Minister | Commander-in-Chief | Ref. |
|---|---|---|---|---|---|---|---|---|---|
| 7 | | Army general Paul Ély | 10 June 1958 | 26 February 1959 | 261 days | Army | Charles de Gaulle; Pierre Guillaumat | René Coty | - |
| 7 | | Army general Paul Ély | 10 June 1958 | 26 February 1959 | 261 days | Army | Charles de Gaulle; Pierre Guillaumat | Charles de Gaulle | - |
| 8 | | Army general Gaston Lavaud | 26 February 1959 | 12 April 1961 | 2 years, 45 days | Army | Pierre Guillaumat; Pierre Messmer | Charles de Gaulle | - |
| 9 | | Air army general André Martin | 12 April 1961 | 19 July 1962 | 1 year, 98 days | Air Force | Pierre Messmer | Charles de Gaulle | - |
| 10 | | Army general Charles Ailleret | 19 July 1962 | 30 March 1968 | 5 years, 255 days | Army | Pierre Messmer | Charles de Gaulle | - |
| 11 | | Air army general Michel Fourquet | 30 March 1968 | 9 June 1971 | 3 years, 72 days | Air Force | Pierre Messmer; Michel Debré | Charles de Gaulle | - |
| 11 | | Air army general Michel Fourquet | 30 March 1968 | 9 June 1971 | 3 years, 72 days | Air Force | Pierre Messmer; Michel Debré | Georges Pompidou | - |
| 12 | | Air army general François Maurin | 9 June 1971 | 1 July 1975 | 4 years, 22 days | Air Force | Michel Debré; Robert Galley; Jacques Soufflet; Yvon Bourges | Georges Pompidou | - |
| 12 | | Air army general François Maurin | 9 June 1971 | 1 July 1975 | 4 years, 22 days | Air Force | Michel Debré; Robert Galley; Jacques Soufflet; Yvon Bourges | Valéry Giscard d'Estaing | - |
| 13 | | Army general Guy Méry | 1 July 1975 | 20 July 1980 | 5 years, 19 days | Army | Yvon Bourges | Valéry Giscard d'Estaing | - |
| 14 | | Army general Claude Vanbremeersch | 20 July 1980 | 1 February 1981 | 196 days | Army | Yvon Bourges; Joël Le Theule; Robert Galley | Valéry Giscard d'Estaing | |
| 15 | | Army general Jeannou Lacaze | 1 February 1981 | 1 August 1985 | 4 years, 181 days | Army | Robert Galley; Charles Hernu | Valéry Giscard d'Estaing | |
| 15 | | Army general Jeannou Lacaze | 1 February 1981 | 1 August 1985 | 4 years, 181 days | Army | Robert Galley; Charles Hernu | François Mitterrand | |
| 16 | | Air army general Jean Saulnier | 1 August 1985 | 16 November 1987 | 2 years, 107 days | Air Force | Charles Hernu; Paul Quilès; André Giraud | François Mitterrand | |
| 17 | | Army general Maurice Schmitt | 16 November 1987 | 24 April 1991 | 3 years, 159 days | Army | André Giraud; Jean-Pierre Chevènement; Pierre Joxe | François Mitterrand | |
| 18 | | Admiral; Jacques Lanxade | 24 April 1991 | 9 September 1995 | 4 years, 138 days | Navy | Pierre Joxe; François Léotard; Charles Millon | François Mitterrand | |
| 18 | | Admiral; Jacques Lanxade | 24 April 1991 | 9 September 1995 | 4 years, 138 days | Navy | Pierre Joxe; François Léotard; Charles Millon | Jacques Chirac | |
| 19 | | Air army general Jean-Philippe Douin | 9 September 1995 | 9 April 1998 | 2 years, 212 days | Air Force | Charles Millon; Alain Richard | Jacques Chirac | |
| 20 | | Army general Jean-Pierre Kelche | 9 April 1998 | 30 October 2002 | 4 years, 204 days | Army | Alain Richard; Michèle Alliot-Marie | Jacques Chirac | |
| 21 | | Army general Henri Bentégeat | 30 October 2002 | 4 October 2006 | 3 years, 339 days | Army | Michèle Alliot-Marie | Jacques Chirac | |
| 22 | | Army general Jean-Louis Georgelin | 4 October 2006 | 25 February 2010 | 3 years, 144 days | Army | Michèle Alliot-Marie; Hervé Morin | Jacques Chirac | |
| 22 | | Army general Jean-Louis Georgelin | 4 October 2006 | 25 February 2010 | 3 years, 144 days | Army | Michèle Alliot-Marie; Hervé Morin | Nicolas Sarkozy | |
| 23 | | Admiral; Édouard Guillaud | 25 February 2010 | 15 February 2014 | 3 years, 355 days | Navy | Hervé Morin; Alain Juppé; Gérard Longuet; Jean-Yves Le Drian | Nicolas Sarkozy | |
| 23 | | Admiral; Édouard Guillaud | 25 February 2010 | 15 February 2014 | 3 years, 355 days | Navy | Hervé Morin; Alain Juppé; Gérard Longuet; Jean-Yves Le Drian | Nicolas Sarkozy; François Hollande | |
| 24 | | Army general Pierre de Villiers | 15 February 2014 | 20 July 2017 | 3 years, 155 days | Army | Jean-Yves Le Drian; Sylvie Goulard; Florence Parly | Nicolas Sarkozy; François Hollande | |
| 24 | | Army general Pierre de Villiers | 15 February 2014 | 20 July 2017 | 3 years, 155 days | Army | Jean-Yves Le Drian; Sylvie Goulard; Florence Parly | François Hollande; Emmanuel Macron | |
| 25 | | Army general François Lecointre | 20 July 2017 | 22 July 2021 | 4 years, 2 days | Army | Florence Parly | François Hollande; Emmanuel Macron | |
| 25 | | Army general François Lecointre | 20 July 2017 | 22 July 2021 | 4 years, 2 days | Army | Florence Parly | Emmanuel Macron | |
| 26 | | Army general Thierry Burkhard | 22 July 2021 | 1 September 2025 | 4 years, 41 days | Army | Florence Parly | Emmanuel Macron | |
| 27 | | Air army general Fabien Mandon | 1 September 2025 | Incumbent | 1 year, 74 days | Air Force | Sébastien Lecornu | Emmanuel Macron | |

== See also ==
- Chief of the Military Staff of the President of the Republic
- Head of the Prime Minister's military cabinet
- Head of the Minister of Defence's military cabinet
- Chief of Staff of the French Air and Space Force
- Chief of Staff of the French Navy
- Chief of Staff of the French Army
- Special Operations Command
- Directorate General of the National Gendarmerie
