= Army general (France) =

Military rank in the French army

Army General Général d'armée
- Sleeve insignia for the army, air force and the gendarmerie
- Country: France
- Service branch: Army; Air Force; Gendarmerie
- Rank group: General officer
- NATO rank code: OF-9
- Formation: 6 June 1939
- Next higher rank: Army: Marshal of France (Note: Not a rank, but a dignity in the State.); Air Force & Gendarmerie: None
- Next lower rank: Corps general (Note: Not a rank, but a position and style.)
- Equivalent ranks: Admiral

Army general (French: Général d'armée) is the highest active military rank of the French Army and the National Gendarmerie. It is also used in the Air and Space Force, where it is called Général d'armée aérienne.

Officially, it is not a rank but a position and style bestowed on some divisional generals, which is the highest substantive rank, in charge of important commands, such as Chief of Staff of the French Army or Chief of the Defence Staff. It is an OF–9 NATO rank, equivalent to the French Navy rank of admiral.

In the army, only a Marshal of France has precedence; however, Marshal of France is not a rank but a dignity in the State, and the last Marshal of France died in 1967.

== History ==
The rank was created on 6 June 1939 by a decree of the President of the French Republic published in the Journal Officiel de la République Française, following a joint report by the Ministers of War, of the Navy and of the Air. They came to the conclusion that the higher hierarchy was more often in relation with the one of other countries, which frequently had more than two general ranks. By necessity, two positions and styles were created to address this issue, army general and corps general. The decree also provided that the divisional generals already commanding a corps were made corps generals and the ones members of the Superior War Council army generals.

== Insignia description ==
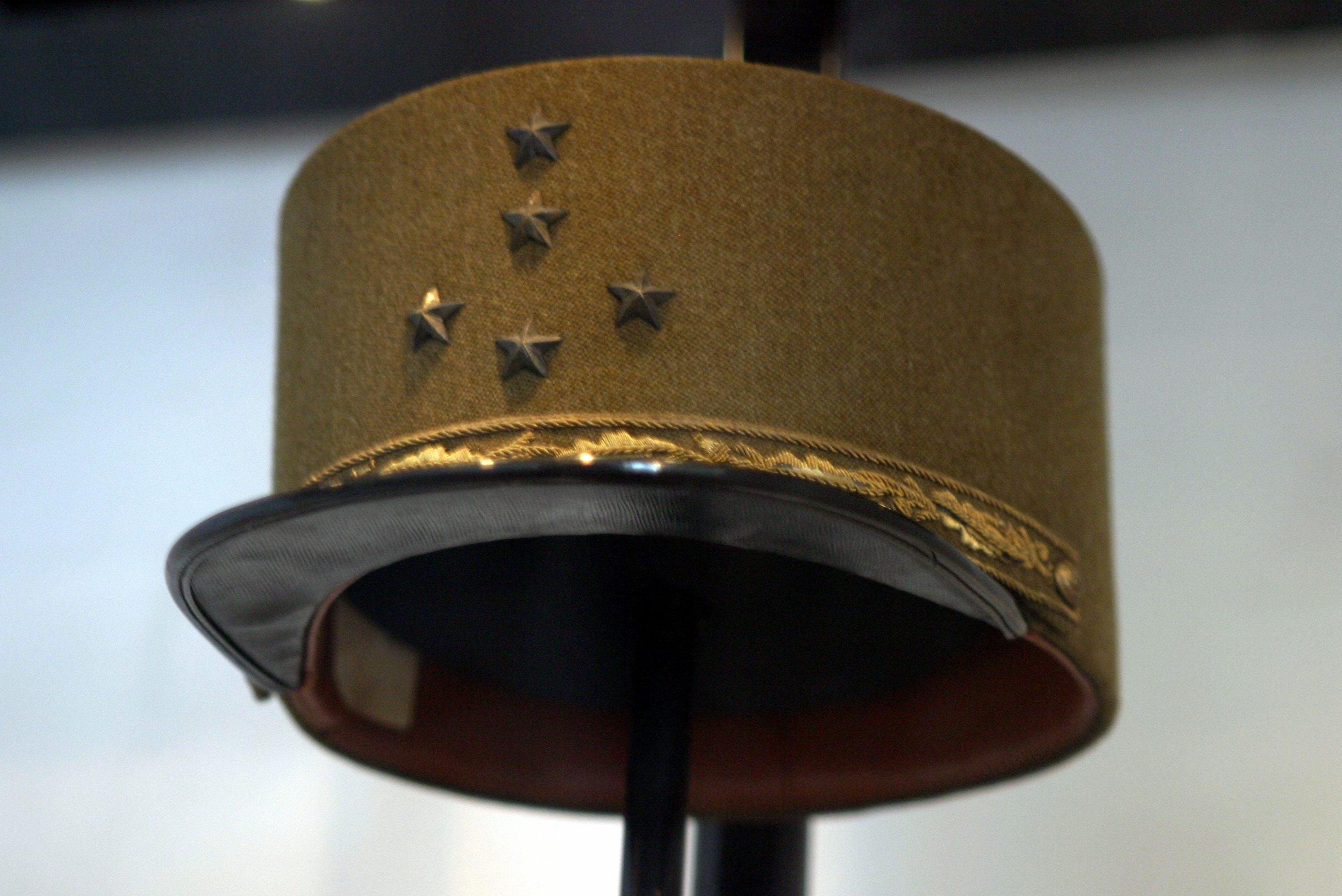
Service dress uniform kepi of an army general.

A French army general displays five stars on a shoulder board; the number of stars should not be compared with that of generals from other NATO countries, usually denoted by four stars only. The rank in the National Gendarmerie additionally displays a golden grenade above the stars. No shoulder board are worn on the full dress or service dress uniform; instead, the insignia is worn on the sleeves.

After the Second World War the design of the full dress uniform kepi for a general changed, now also displaying the stars. It was already the case for field headgear, with no other ornament than the stars.

== Other ==
The mention of the current usage of "a sixth star authorized for the army general in command of the Paris sector" is an urban legend.

The title of army general in France and elsewhere should not be confused with the rank of general of the army, which is more senior, and corresponds to other countries' marshal or field marshal. The rank of "general of the army" theoretically corresponds to overall command of an entire national army with several armies in the field, while the title "army general" only corresponds to the command of an individual army in the field.

== See also ==
- Ranks in the French Army
- Ranks in the French Air and Space Force
- National Gendarmerie#Ranks
