= André Zeller =

French Army general (1898-1979)

- Born: 1 January 1898; Besançon, France
- Died: 18 September 1979 (aged 81); Paris, France
- Relatives: Léon Zeller (father); Henri Zeller (brother)
- Military career
- Allegiance: France
- Branch: French Army
- Service years: 1915–1959
- Rank: Général d’armée
- Conflicts: |: World War I; Battle of Verdun; Battle of the Somme; Second Battle of the Aisne; 1917 Flanders offensive; 1918 German spring offensive; Second Battle of the Marne; Battle of the Ailette; Franco-Turkish War; World War II; Battle of France; Dunkirk evacuation; Operation Torch; Tunisian campaign; Italian campaign; Operation Dragoon; Vosges campaign; Colmar Pocket; Algerian War; Algiers putsch

André Zeller (1 January 1898 – 18 September 1979) was a French Army general. He served during World War I, the Franco-Turkish War, and World War II, and served as chief of staff of the French Army during the Algerian War.

Zeller was one of the four generals (the others being Raoul Salan, Edmond Jouhaud, and Maurice Challe) who organized the Algiers putsch of 1961. For his role, Zeller was sentenced to 15 years in prison by a military court. He was released in 1966, and granted amnesty by Charles de Gaulle in 1968.

== Biography ==
=== Early life ===
Born on 1 January 1898 in Besançon in eastern France, Zeller had entered the preparatory class at Collège Stanislas de Paris to prepare for the École polytechnique entrance exam when World War I broke out in 1914.

=== World War I ===
Zeller enlisted in the French Army for the duration of the conflict in May 1915 at only 17 years of age, having finally obtained the authorization of his father, the future général de division Léon Zeller. He trained as a gunner in Maisons-Alfort in Paris at the depot of the 59th Artillery Regiment. He passed the student officer competition and entered the artillery school in Fontainebleau on 25 June 1915.

At the end of October 1915, Zeller was assigned to the 8th Artillery Regiment. He took part in the Battle of Verdun in 1916. During the battle, his unit suffered a long and painful ordeal from 1 to 6 June 1916 at Esnes-en-Argonne, 1,500 metres (1,600 yd) from the Germans and in sight of Le Mort Homme, suffering an incessant German artillery bombardment. He was awarded a citation à l'ordre of the regiment. He later took part in the Battle of the Somme in 1916 as part of the 20th Army Corps before being sent back to Fontainebleau for six weeks.

Promoted to second lieutenant, Zeller was assigned to the 27th Artillery Regiment in the 1st Army Corps. He was designated as liaison officer to the infantry. From November 1916 to February 1917, he was in the Champagne sector. Moving to the Aisne sector, he witnessed the disastrous start of the Second Battle of the Aisne on 16 April 1917, a day which saw the annihilation of two of the three battalions of the French 208th Infantry Regiment, the destruction in a few minutes of a group of the 13th Artillery Regiment that had advanced in accordance with the operational order, and the destruction of a French tank force at Berry-au-Bac.

Zeller participated in four battles of the 1917 Flanders offensive between 31 July and 23 October 1917. On 1 December 1917, he was again sent to Fontainebleau to take a three-month course for "victory battery commanders."

Returning to the 27th Artillery Regiment in the Aisne sector on 23 March 1918, Zeller was disappointed when he was appointed to the regimental staff as the regiment's signals officer. Between 5 and 15 April 1918, his regiment was placed at the disposal of the 151st Infantry Division of General Pierre des Vallières, engaged north of the Ailette to protect its retreat south of the river during the German spring offensive of 1918. In the last days of April 1918, Zeller was promoted to lieutenant.

Quartered in the Beauvais region, Zeller took part in division maneuvers. When these ended on 23 May 1918, General Paul Joseph Hyacinthe Mignot, commanding the 2nd Infantry Division, explained that the German spring offensive was losing momentum, that the Germans would not be able to renew their efforts of March and April 1918, that the raging Spanish influenza pandemic had made German units lose effectiveness, and that the critical point of the German offensive had passed. On 27 May 1918, however, the Germans broke through the front held by the French 6th Army in the Chemin des Dames sector, beginning the Second Battle of the Marne. From 28 May to 2 June 1918, Zeller found his unit constantly on the move as it responded to a chaotic series of orders and sought to block the road to Paris to the Germans, and he faced a requirement to quickly recover telephone wire that was abandoned with each movement of his regiment. Assigned to the command post of the regiment at the castle of Bourneville in Marolles to face the Germans, who had reached the Ourcq, Zeller caught the Spanish flu. He was half unconscious for three days, and it took several weeks for him to recover fully.

After the failure of the last German offensive in Champagne and on the Marne with the conclusion of the Second Battle of the Marne on 15 July 1918, Zeller participated from 18 to 28 July 1918 in the successful Allied counteroffensive. Meanwhile, he left his 20 telephone operators on 23 July 1918 upon his appointment as an artillery battery commander. His unit then moved to the 10th Army and wandered according to orders for two weeks. Beginning on 15 August 1918, it was involved in the Battle of the Ailette.

On 12 September 1918, Zeller's regiment embarked for a calm sector in the Territoire de Belfort, near his boyhood home. He obtained a leave of eight days to attend the funeral of the youngest of his sisters, who had died of the Spanish flu. He rejoined his regiment while it was en route to the Lorraine front and had the unpleasant surprise of learning that he had to give up his place as commander of the 3rd Battery to a more senior lieutenant. On the day of the armistice with Germany, which brought World War I to an end on 11 November 1918, his regiment passed through Nancy in front of an apparently indifferent population.

On 19 November 1918, Zeller escaped in a cart with two lieutenants to attend the official entry of French forces into Metz and in the early afternoon saw troops of the 10th Army, cheered by a jubilant crowd, parade in front of General Philippe Pétain, who was appointed Marshal of France at noon that day, followed by General Edmond Buat and 25 officers of the French Army's general headquarters.

Zeller entered Germany with his regiment via the Saarland and paraded on 14 December 1918 before General Charles Mangin in Mainz. His regiment then returned to the right bank of the Rhine and spent two months housed in small villages in the Taunus.

=== Franco-Turkish War ===
On 20 February 1919, Zeller arrived reluctantly at the École polytechnique preparation center set up in Strasbourg. In the summer of 1919 he failed the entrance examination, but he remained in the army and joined his regiment in garrison first at Saint-Omer, then at Bailleul. He was then assigned to the 60th Artillery Regiment in Strasbourg.

In July 1920, Zeller was designated for assignment in an overseas theater of operations. He chose the Levant in preference to Morocco. Before leaving, he attended the ceremonies of the 50th anniversary of the fighting of 1870 in Lower Alsace during the Franco-Prussian War.

On 22 November 1920, Zeller embarked on the cargo ship Jerusalem, operated by a White Russian crew. On 30 November 1920 he landed in Beirut, headquarters of the Army of the Levant, which had been involved since December 1918 in the Franco-Turkish War in Cilicia. He received without pleasure his order of assignment to the 2nd Joint Ammunition Section. After a week of conferences in military circles, he took the train and joined the headquarters of the 2nd Division of the Levant in Aleppo on 8 December 1920, then on 12 December 1920 moved to the railway station at Oued Sadjour. Within the shuttle convoy which supplied French troops engaged in the siege of Aïntab, he had under his command for the transport of ammunition 250 men, 100 Araba carriages, and 350 horses and mules.

After the departure of General Goubeau and elements of the 4th Division of the Levant, which had reinforced French forces for three weeks during the siege of Aïntab, Zeller was appointed to command the 3rd Battery of the 273rd Artillery Regiment, armed with Model 1897 75-millimetre (2.95 in) field guns. At the beginning of 1921, he took part in the siege and capture of Aïntab from the Turks. During the rest of 1921, he participated in various operations along the Euphrates.

=== Interwar ===
Promoted to captain in 1928, Zeller was admitted to the École supérieure de guerre in 1931. He served on the staff of the 19th Army Corps in Algiers in Algeria in 1935. Promoted to major in 1938, he was head of the French transport mission to the King of the Belgians in Belgium.

=== World War II ===
World War II began with the German invasion of Poland on 1 September 1939, and France entered the war on 3 September 1939. On 10 May 1940, the Battle of France began when German forces moved into France, the Netherlands, Belgium, and Luxembourg. Zeller was in Bruges, Belgium, on 27 May 1940 when the Belgian Army surrendered. to the Germans. To escape the encirclement of Allied forces at Dunkirk, he embarked on 29 May 1940 on a French Navy submarine chaser in La Panne, between Dunkirk and Nieuport. After a brief stay in London, he returned to France and was appointed regulator general of the French 7th Army, commanded by General Aubert Frère, at the beginning of June 1940. Italy declared war on France on 10 June 1940 and joined the invasion. The Battle of France ended in France's defeat and armistice with Germany on 22 June 1940 and with Italy on 24 June, both of which went into effect on 25 June 1940.

Zeller subsequently served in the army of Vichy France. Transferred at his request to French North Africa, he arrived in Algiers on 26 September 1940 assigned to duty as military director of transport. Promoted to lieutenant colonel in August 1942, he became chief of ctaff to General Charles Mast, commanding the Algiers Division, a few days before the beginning of Operation Torch, the Allied amphibious landings in French North Africa, on 8 November 1942. After the cessation of hostilities between French forces French North Africa on 11 November 1942, French forces in Africa switched to the Allied side in the forces of Free France. As chief of staff of the Algiers March Division, he took part in the Tunisian campaign from November 1942 to May 1943.

From December 1943 to July 1944, Zeller was the deputy chief of staff of the French Expeditionary Corps in Italy commanded by General Alphonse Juin. On 16 August 1944, on the staff of General Jean de Lattre de Tassigny, commander of Army B, he landed on the coast of Provence during Operation Dragoon and shortly after took command of the artillery of the 3rd Algerian Infantry Division. He then commanded the French 1st Armored Division, which he led in the fighting in the Vosges, in the "race to the Rhine," and, at the beginning of 1945, in the reduction of the Colmar Pocket.

=== Post-World War II ===
As director of artillery and second in command of the École de guerre, Zeller was promoted to général de brigade in 1946, then appointed artillery inspector. Promoted to général de division in 1950, he served as commander of the 3rd Military Region in Rennes, France, from 1951 to 1955.

=== Algerian War ===
While Zeller was serving at Rennes, the Algerian War broke out in November 1954. In 1955 the Minister of Defence, General Marie-Pierre Kœnig, appointed Zeller chief of staff of the French Army, and with the appointment came a promotion to général de corps d’armée. Zeller resigned from his post in February 1956 to protest against a decision by the Government of France to reduce the workforce in Algeria.

On 19 December 1957, Zeller was appointed to the rank of général d’armée in the second section of general officers of the French Army. Reintegrated into the first section on 1 July 1958 after General Charles de Gaulle returned to power as prime minister of France, Zeller resumed his duties as French Army chief of staff, which he continued until 1 October 1959, when he returned to the second section of general officers.

=== Algiers putsch of 1961 ===
Zeller took part in the Algiers putsch of 1961 from 21 to 25 April 1961 with Generals Maurice Challe sand Edmond Jouhaud, soon joined by General Raoul Salan. In charge of economic and financial affairs, he had at most only one month of resources with which to pay the salaries of the putsch participants. After the putsch failed, Zeller hid out briefly in Algiers before surrendering on 6 May 1961 to General de Belenet. He was imprisoned in the La Santé Prison in Paris. Like General Challe, he was sentenced to 15 years of criminal detention and deprivation of his civic rights by the High Military Tribunal after the public prosecutor, Antonin Besson, refused to request the death penalty demanded by the Minister of Justice, Edmond Michelet. Interned in Clairvaux Prison in Ville-sous-la-Ferté and then in Tulle, he was released in July 1966 and granted amnesty in 1968.

=== Death ===
Zeller died in Paris on 18 September 1979. His grave is in the cemetery at Menetou-Salon. His wife, born Élisabeth Siméon, died at the age of 100 in 2009.

== Decorations ==
- Grand Officer of the Legion of Honour
- Croix de guerre 1914–1918
- Croix de Guerre 1939–1945
- Croix de guerre des théâtres d'opérations extérieures
- Cross for Military Valour

== Works ==
- Les Hommes de la Commune (English: The Men of the Commune) (Librairie Académique Perrin, 1969)
- Dialogues avec un lieutenant (English: Dialogues with a Lieutenant) (Editions Plon, 1971)
- Dialogues avec un colonel (English: Dialogues with a Colonel) (Editions Plon, 1972)
- Dialogues avec un général (English: Dialogues with a General) (Editions des Presses de la Cité, 1974)
- Soldats perdus (English: Lost Soldiers) (Librairie Académique Perrin, 1977)
