= Rafailovich mansion =

Coordinates: 47.2117°N 38.9322°E

- Дом Рафаиловича
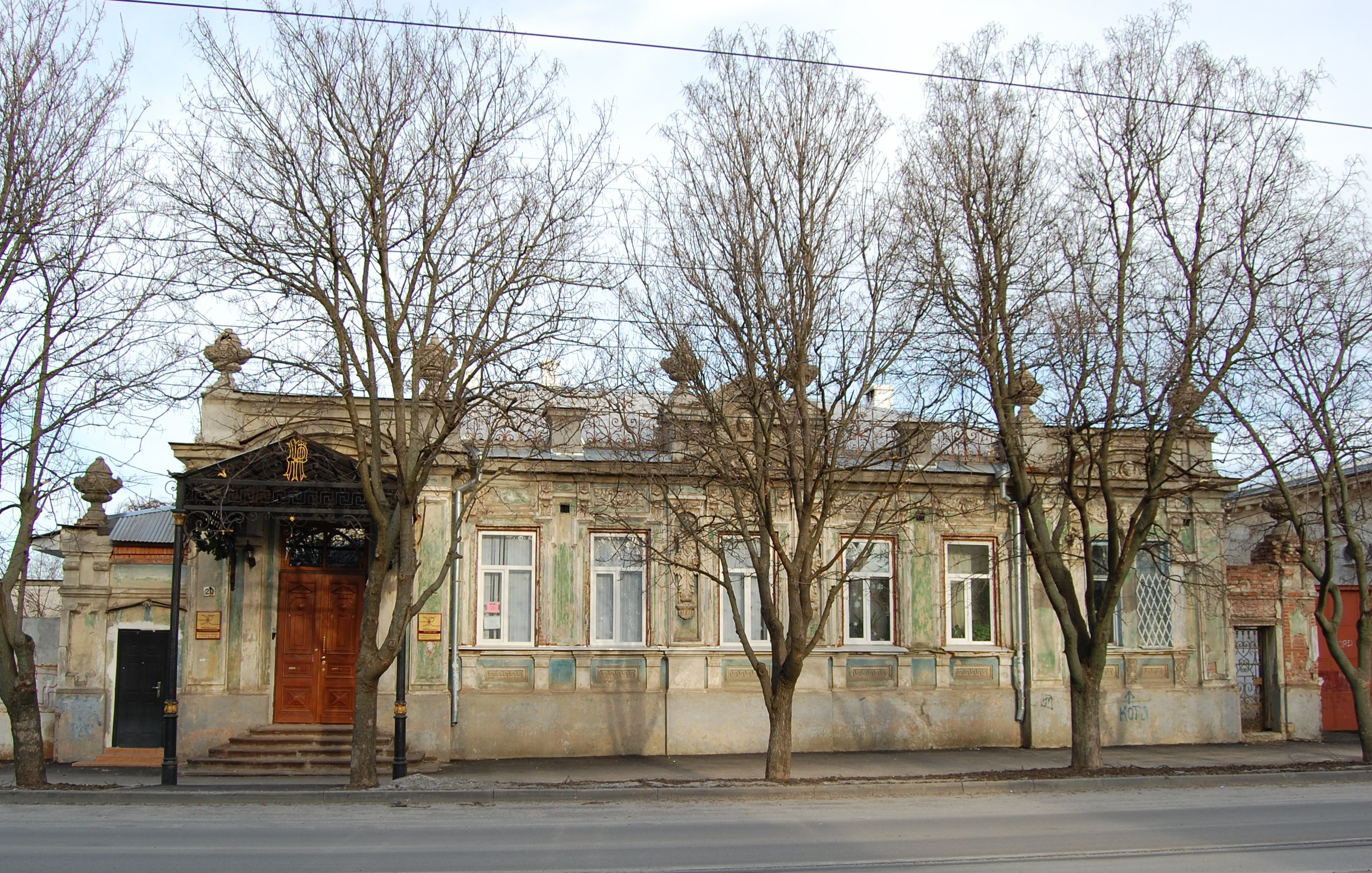
- Facade of the mansion
- Established: 1860s
- Location: Taganrog
- Type: Mansion

Rafailovich mansion (Russian: Дом Рафаиловича) — an old mansion in Taganrog, Russia. Situated in Frunze Street, 20, between Karaspasov mansion and Drossi mansion. It is considered to be a cultural monument and a valuable object of Russia's cultural heritage. Many people think that it is one of the most beautiful buildings in old part of Taganrog.

== History ==
The house was built in 1860s.

Originally it belonged to Mikhail Karaspasov, who was a merchant, but then it was bought by a Turkish citizen Panas Constantinidi.

At the end of 1880s Ekaterina Antonovna became owner of the house. She was married to merchant Nikolai Ivanovich Rafailovich (1850—1912). Their daughter, Zinaida, was forced by her father to marry Nikolai Nikolaevich Alafuzov, who was fifty-four years old, while she was eighteen. The marriage was unhappy and they soon divorced. Together with her second husband Maksimov, who was a son of a wealthy bourgeoise from Rostov-on-Don, Zinaida went travelling abroad, particularly to Paris, France. In 1895 Maksimov inherited 65 thousand roubles from his father when he died. After the events of October Revolution, the spouses never came back to Russia.

In 1919, when HQ of Armed Forces of South Russia led by Anton Denikin was situated in Taganrog (that was from 8 August to 27 December), in Rafailovich mansion lived general Charles Mangin, the head of French mission. From 1920 to 1924 the house was occupied by political command of 1st Cavalry Army, served as editorial office of the journal «Listok krasnoarmeytsa» and an HQ of OSNAZ units that were involved in fighting crime, persecution of opposition and collecting food tax from local villages. In 1925 the mansion became a dwelling house again.

At the same year in Taganrog authorities carried out global «municipalization» of private accommodations which had total area above 100 square metres. Former owners were either provided a small room in their own house, or relocated to other apartments. As part of this «municipalization», the mansion was divided into communal apartments. Without appropriate maintenance, it quickly lost its inner and outer look. Now ruined facade requires a complex restoration.

== Architectural features ==
The mansion was built in «Eclecticist» style. There are elements that can be considered to be of Classicism, but also of Baroque. Some experts classify such style as «Neobaroque». The house is one-story, yet it seems some higher because of high basement and decorations on the roof.

Alexander Balandin, a priest, described outlook of the building in the following way: «Ten beautiful antique amphoraes above gates and house, at the highest point you can see the head of an ancient philosopher, five women's heads at the wall, three head of Satire — the spirit of the woods... The mansion looks somewhat austere, yet beautiful.».

== Gallery ==
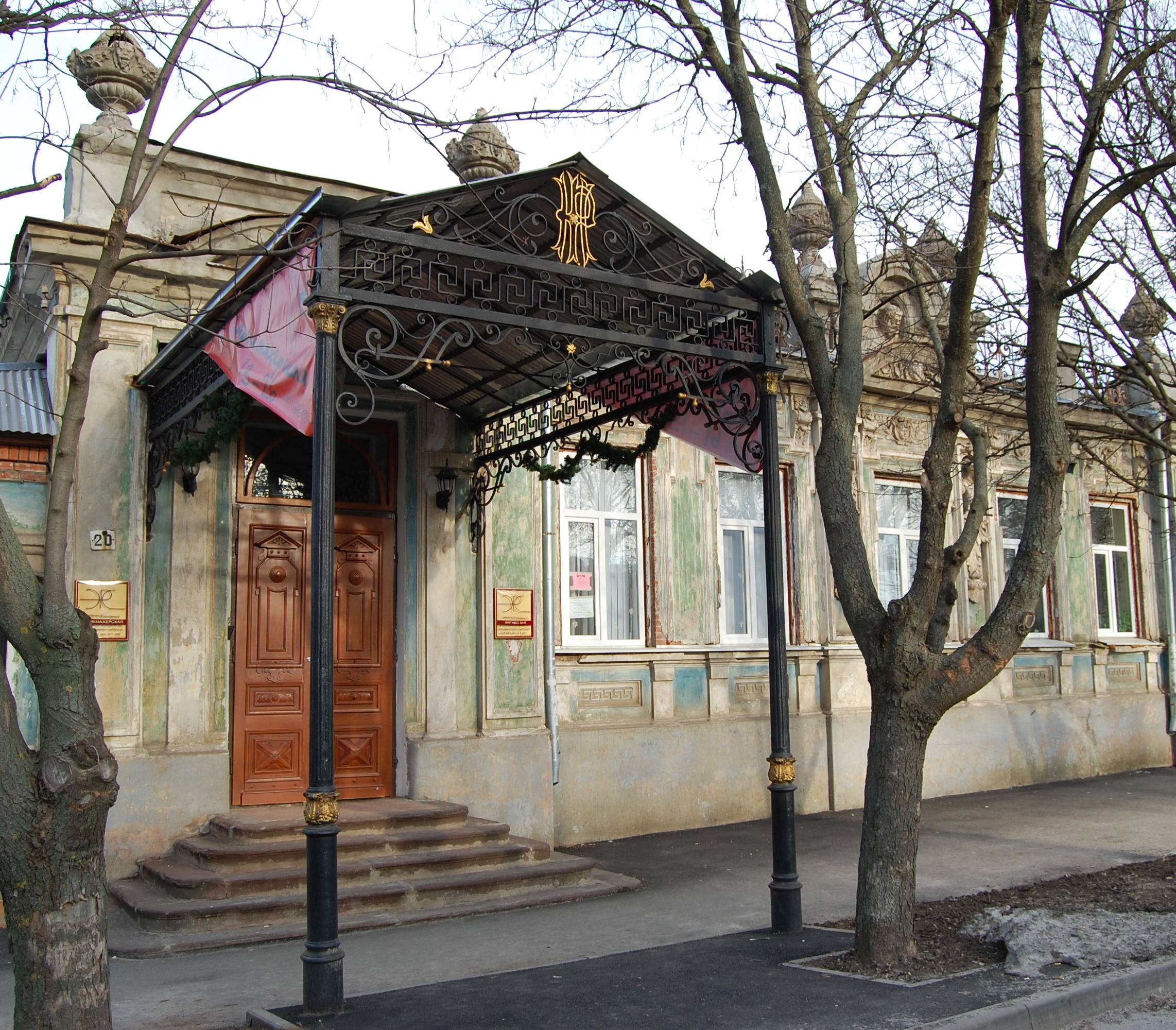
Main entrance, 2010

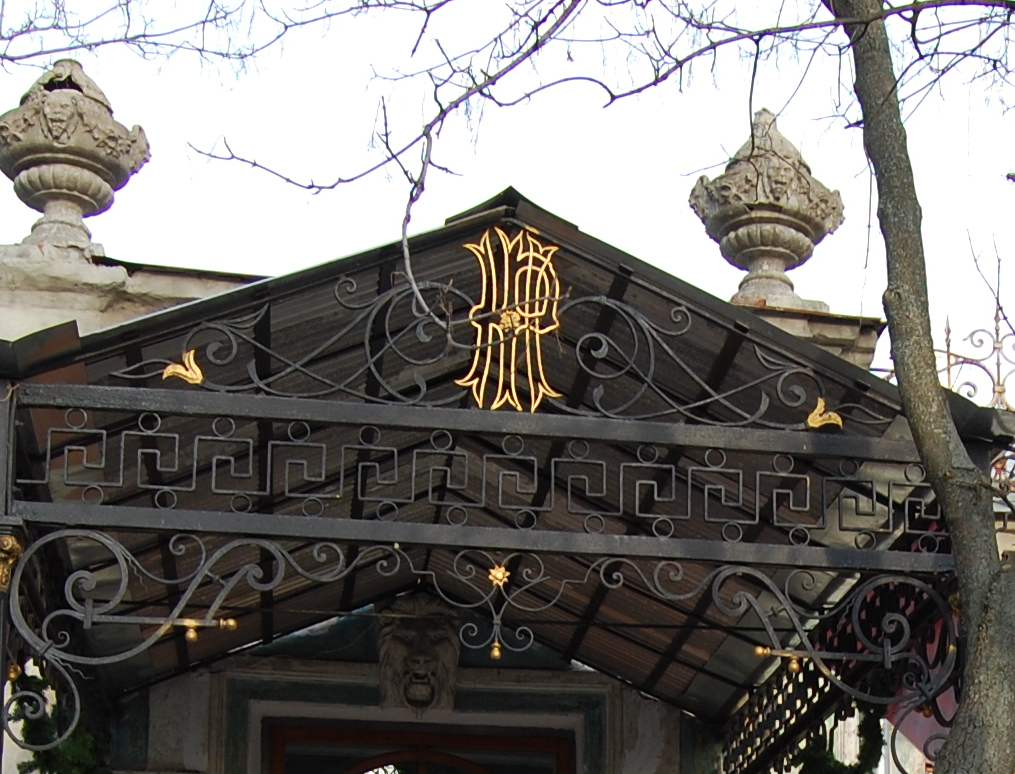
Monogram, 2010

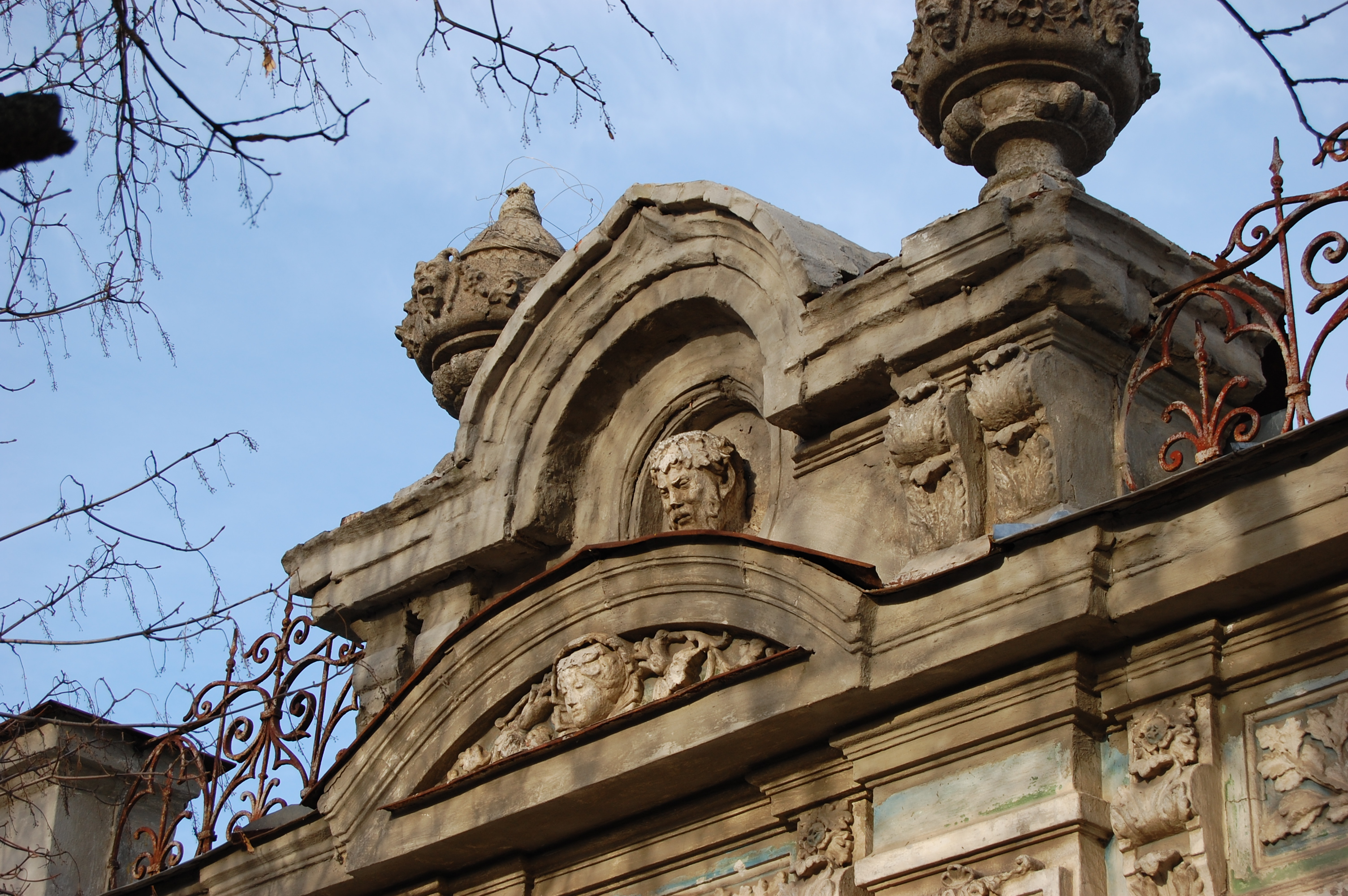
Gable, 2010

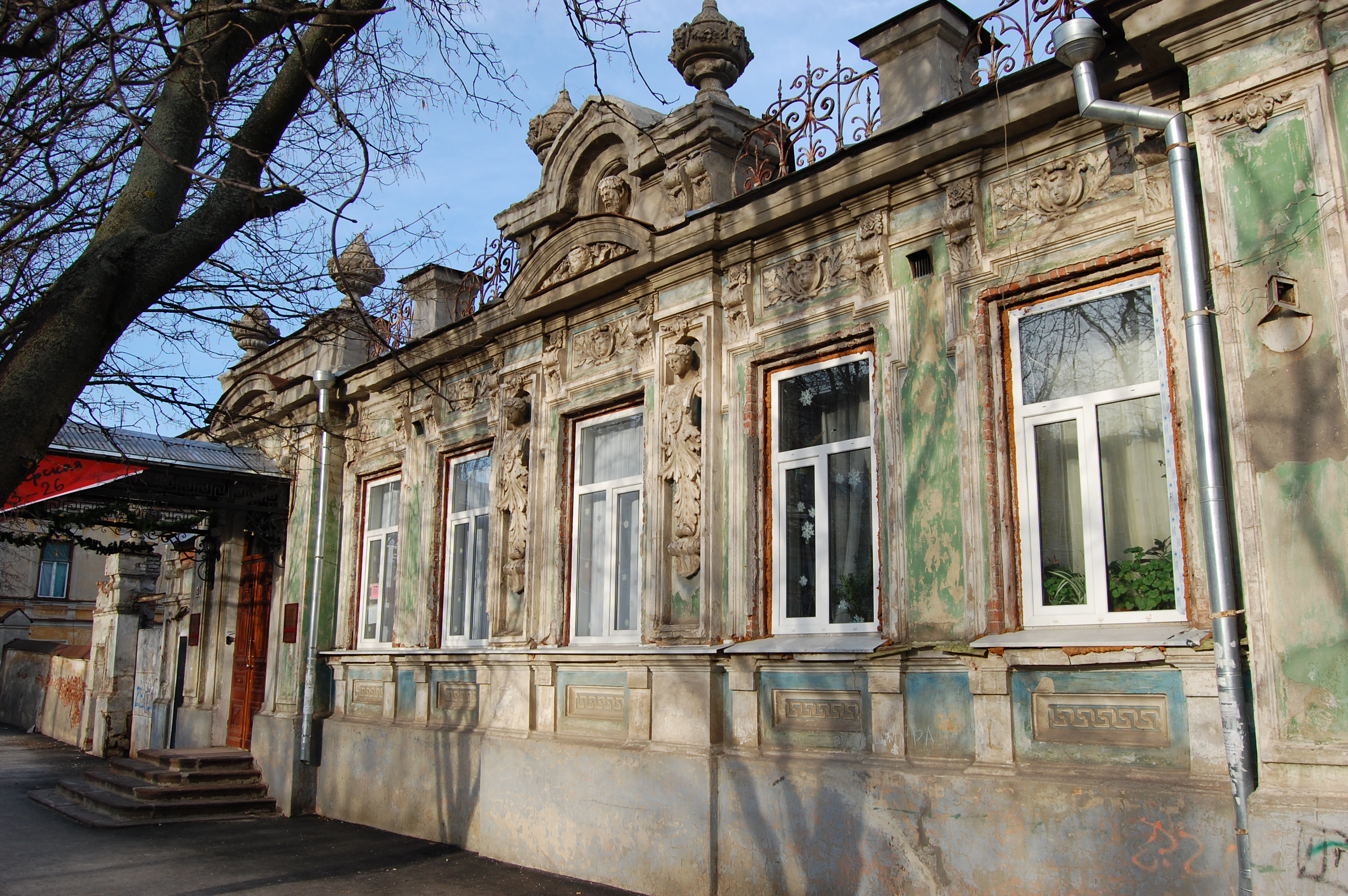
Facade, 2010

== Rafailovich mansion in culture ==
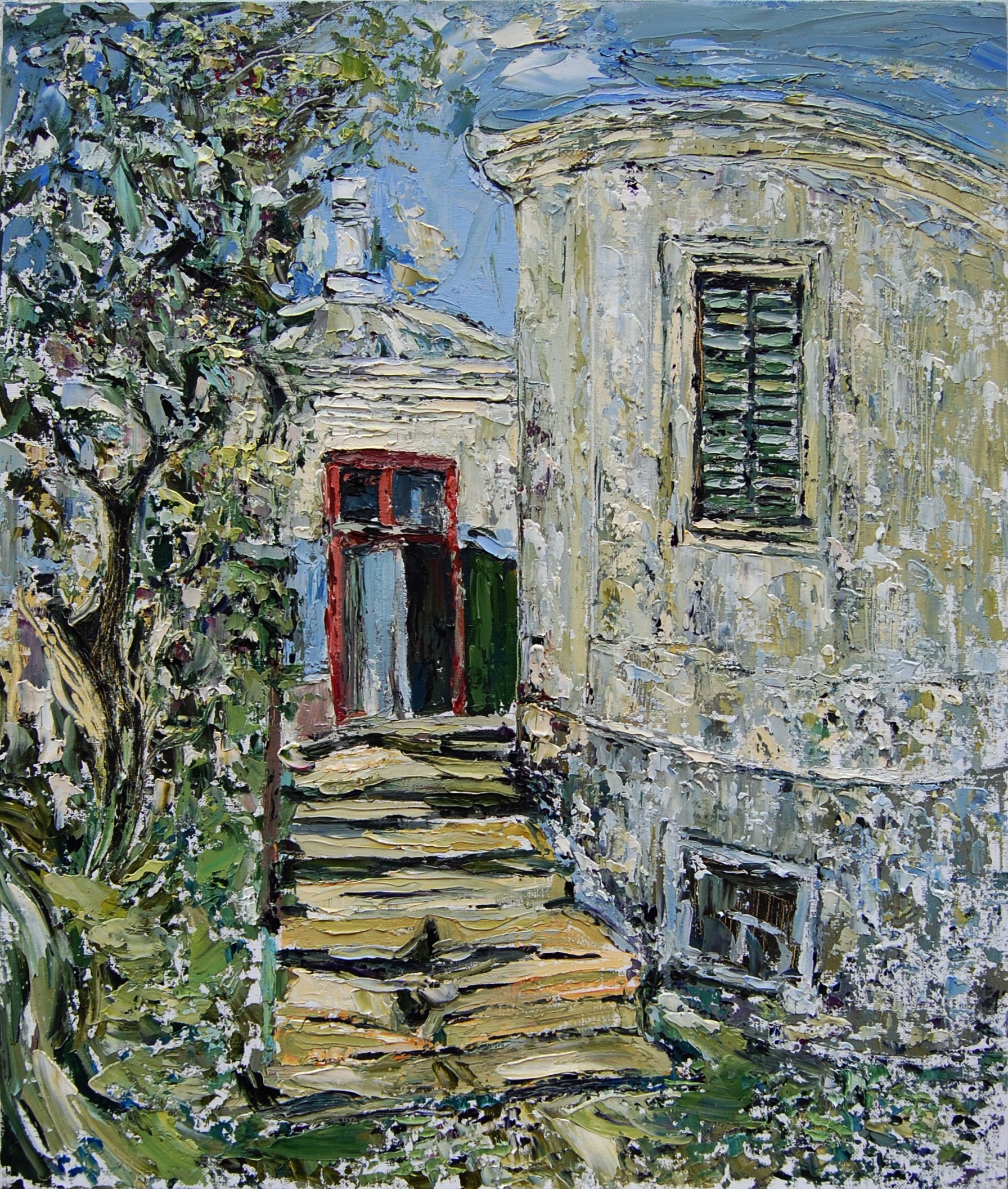
N. Duritskaya. "Rafailovich mansion. The veranda" (2014)

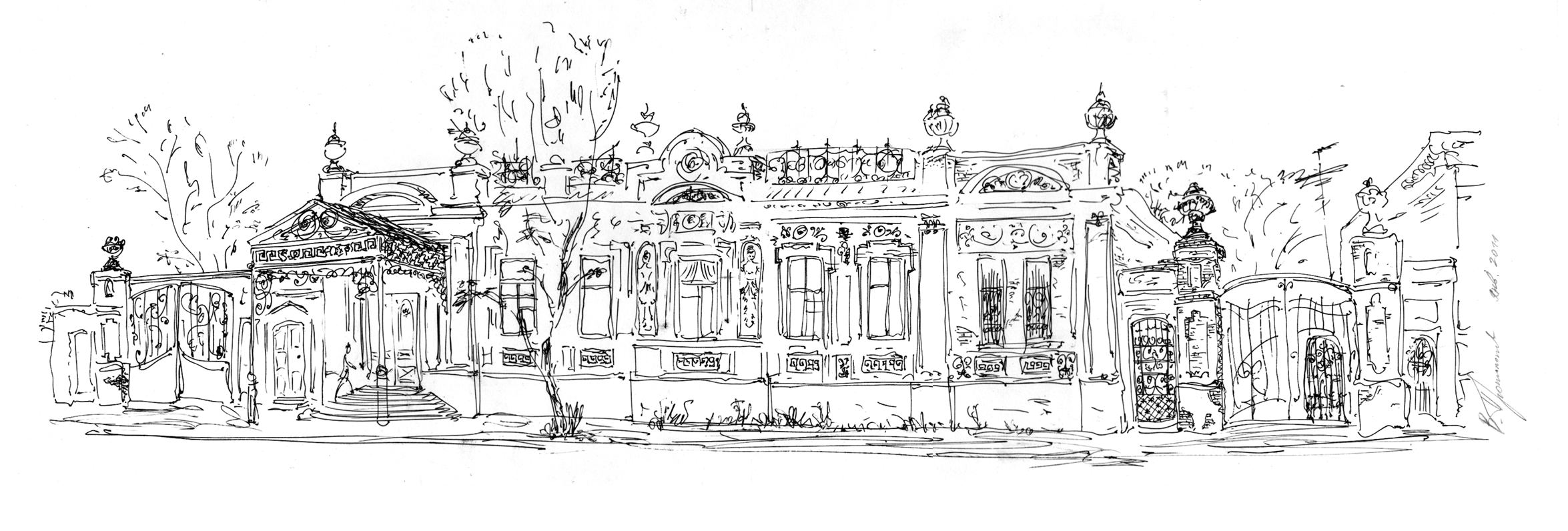
V. Protopopov. "Rafailovich mansion" (2011)

== Famous dwellers ==
- Charles Mangin (1866—1925) — French general, Head of French mission to Armed Forces of South Russia HQ.
