= Major General of the Defence Staff (France) =

- Major général des armées
- Insignia of the Armed Forces Staff

- Incumbent; Admiral François-Xavier Polderman since 1 September 2025
- Ministry of Armed Forces
- Type: Part of a military staff
- Abbreviation: M.G.A.
- Member of: Chiefs of Staff Committee
- Reports to: Chief of the Defence Staff
- Seat: Hexagone Balard, Paris
- Appointer: President of the Republic; Requires the Prime Minister's countersignature
- Term length: No fixed term
- Formation: 28 April 1948
- First holder: Henri Zeller
- Website: www.defense.gouv.fr

The Major General of the Defence Staff (French: Major général des Armées, lit. 'Major General of the Armies', acronym: M.G.A.) is a high ranking general officer of the French Armed Forces and the deputy to the Chief of the Defence Staff. As such, it is the second highest position in the armed forces. Major Generals are nominated by the Minister of the Armed Forces and appointed by the Commander-in-Chief, the President of the French Republic. The designation of Major General is not indicative of any rank but is rather a position, as the most recent office holders were all four star generals (OF-9).

== History ==
The office was established on 28 April 1948, during the reorganization of the French higher hierarchy.

== Duties ==
The major general leads the Defence Staff and is assisted by three general officers: the Deputy Chief of Staff for Operations (OPS), the Deputy Chief of Staff for Planning (PLANS) and the Deputy Chief of Staff for Performance (PERF).

They replace the chief of staff when necessary. As a flag officer, they are the commanding officer of the Site of Balard, headquarters of the French Armed Forces and the Ministry of the Armed Forces.

== Office holders ==
No.	Portrait	Rank & Name	Term			Branch	Minister	Commander-in-Chief	Ref. (Note: Upper references are the official decree of nomination in French. Lower references are press articles in English.)
No.	Portrait	Rank & Name	Took office	Left office	Duration	Branch	Minister	Commander-in-Chief	Ref.
Office established
1		Division general Henri Zeller	29 April 1948	8 July 1949	1 year, 70 days	Army	Pierre-Henri Teitgen; René Mayer; Paul Ramadier	Vincent Auriol	-
2		Air brigade general Raoul Vernoux	8 July 1949	11 May 1954	4 years, 307 days	Air Force	Paul Ramadier; René Pleven; Jules Moch; Georges Bidault; René Pleven	Vincent Auriol	-
2		Air brigade general Raoul Vernoux	8 July 1949	11 May 1954	4 years, 307 days	Air Force	Paul Ramadier; René Pleven; Jules Moch; Georges Bidault; René Pleven	René Coty	-
3		Division general Raymond Baillif	11 May 1954	20 October 1955	1 year, 162 days	Army	René Pleven; Pierre Kœnig [...] Pierre Kœnig; Pierre Billotte	René Coty	-
4		Air division general Maurice Challe	20 October 1955	8 October 1958	2 years, 351 days	Air Force	Pierre Billotte; Maurice Bourgès-Maunoury [...] Pierre de Chevigné; Pierre Guillaumat	René Coty	-
5		Army general André Demetz	8 October 1958	28 March 1959	171 days	Army	Pierre Guillaumat; Pierre Messmer	René Coty	-
5		Army general André Demetz	8 October 1958	28 March 1959	171 days	Army	Pierre Guillaumat; Pierre Messmer	Charles de Gaulle	-
6		Air corps general Paul Stehlin	28 March 1959	15 March 1960	353 days	Air Force	Pierre Messmer	Charles de Gaulle	-
		...							
		Air corps general Michel Délaval	1 May 1977	26 August 1979	2 years, 117 days	Air Force	...	Valéry Giscard d'Estaing	-
		Air corps general Jean-Paul Arbelet	26 August 1979	1 October 1983	4 years, 36 days	Air Force	...	Valéry Giscard d'Estaing	-
		Air corps general Jean-Paul Arbelet	26 August 1979	1 October 1983	4 years, 36 days	Air Force	...	François Mitterrand	-
		Squadron vice-admiral Jean-André Brusson	1 October 1983	10 March 1985	1 year, 160 days	Navy	...	François Mitterrand	-
		Squadron vice-admiral Bernard Louzeau	10 March 1985	30 January 1987	1 year, 326 days	Navy	...	François Mitterrand	-
		Squadron vice-admiral Alain Coatanea	30 January 1987	20 November 1990	3 years, 294 days	Navy	André Giraud; Jean-Pierre Chevènement	François Mitterrand	-
		Division general Mary-Jean Voinot	20 November 1990	1 October 1992	1 year, 316 days	Army	Jean-Pierre Chevènement; Pierre Joxe	François Mitterrand	-
		Air corps general Jean-Philippe Douin	1 October 1992	15 June 1994	1 year, 257 days	Air Force	Pierre Joxe; François Léotard	François Mitterrand	-
		Air corps general Jean Rannou	15 June 1994	1 September 1995	1 year, 78 days	Air Force	François Léotard; Charles Millon	François Mitterrand	-
		Air corps general Jean Rannou	15 June 1994	1 September 1995	1 year, 78 days	Air Force	François Léotard; Charles Millon	Jacques Chirac	-
		Corps general Philippe Mercier	1 September 1995	28 August 1996	362 days	Army	Charles Millon	Jacques Chirac	-
		Air corps general Jean-Pierre Kelche	28 August 1996	9 April 1998	1 year, 224 days	Air Force	Charles Millon; Alain Richard	Jacques Chirac	-
		Air corps general Jean-Pierre Job	9 April 1998	1 September 1999	1 year, 145 days	Air Force	Alain Richard	Jacques Chirac	-
		Air corps general Richard Wolsztynski	1 September 1999	1 September 2002	3 years, 0 days	Air Force	Alain Richard; Michèle Alliot-Marie	Jacques Chirac	-
		Counter admiral Alain Coldefy	1 September 2002	15 July 2005	2 years, 317 days	Navy	Michèle Alliot-Marie	Jacques Chirac	-
		Admiral; Hervé Le Riche	15 July 2005	1 September 2007	2 years, 48 days	Navy	Michèle Alliot-Marie; Hervé Morin	Jacques Chirac	-
		Admiral; Hervé Le Riche	15 July 2005	1 September 2007	2 years, 48 days	Navy	Michèle Alliot-Marie; Hervé Morin	Nicolas Sarkozy	-
		Admiral; Pierrick Blairon	1 September 2007	12 March 2010	2 years, 192 days	Navy	Hervé Morin	Nicolas Sarkozy	-
		Army general Pierre de Villiers	12 March 2010	15 February 2014	3 years, 340 days	Army	Hervé Morin; Alain Juppé; Gérard Longuet; Jean-Yves Le Drian	Nicolas Sarkozy	-
		Army general Pierre de Villiers	12 March 2010	15 February 2014	3 years, 340 days	Army	Hervé Morin; Alain Juppé; Gérard Longuet; Jean-Yves Le Drian	François Hollande	-
		Air army general Gratien Maire	15 February 2014	1 September 2016	2 years, 199 days	Air Force	Jean-Yves Le Drian	François Hollande	-
		Admiral; Philippe Coindreau	1 September 2016	1 September 2018	2 years, 0 days	Navy	Jean-Yves Le Drian; Sylvie Goulard; Florence Parly	François Hollande	-
		Admiral; Philippe Coindreau	1 September 2016	1 September 2018	2 years, 0 days	Navy	Jean-Yves Le Drian; Sylvie Goulard; Florence Parly	Emmanuel Macron	-
		Admiral; Jean Casabianca	1 September 2018	Incumbent	8 years, 36 days	Navy	Florence Parly	Emmanuel Macron	
