= Victor-Constant Michel =

French general

Général Victor-Constant Michel
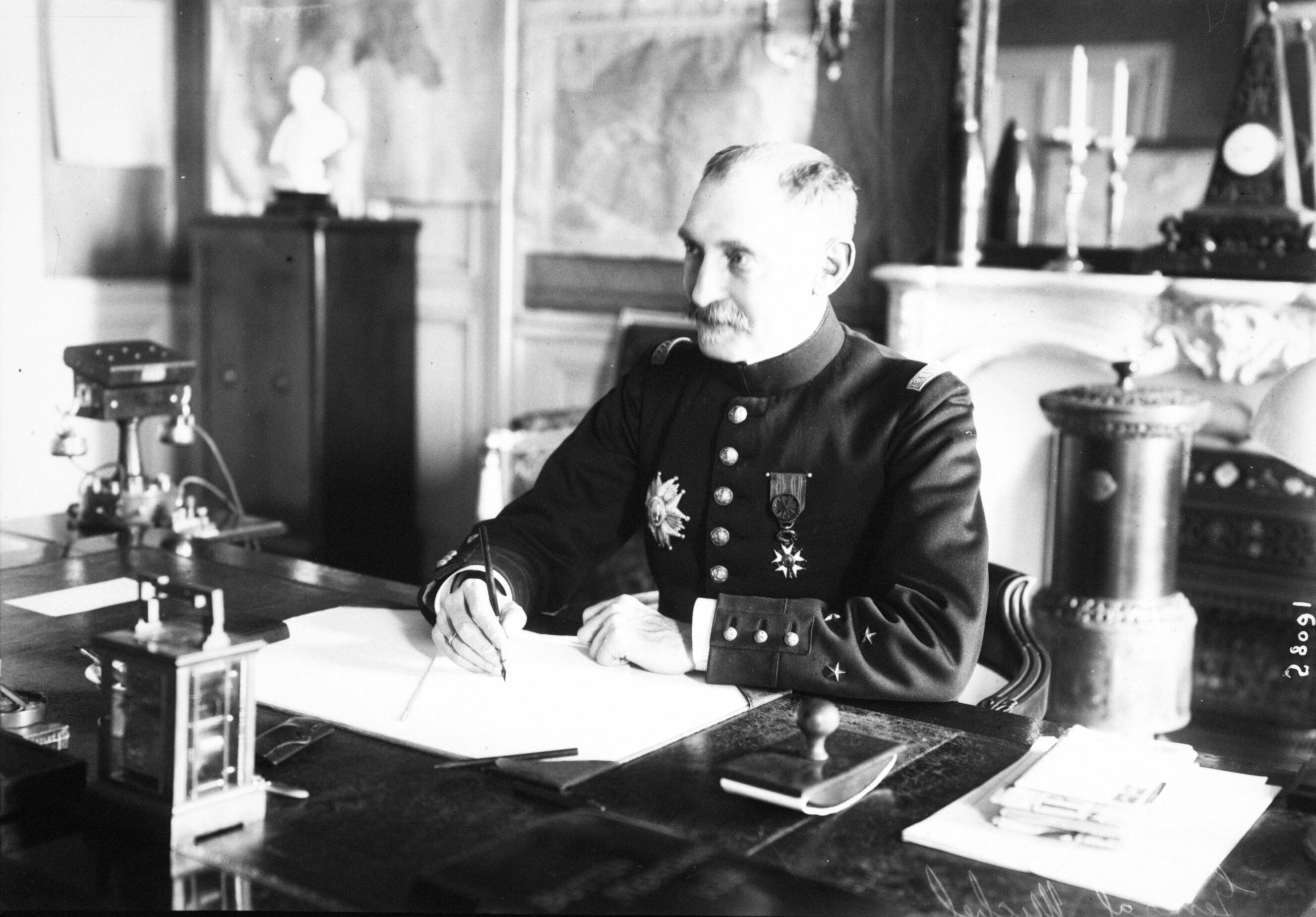
- Général Michel in 1913
- Born: 30 January 1850; Auteuil, Seine, France
- Died: 8 November 1937 (aged 87); Meulan, France
- Military career
- Allegiance: France
- Branch: French Army
- Service years: 1867–1914
- Conflicts: Franco-Prussian War: Siege of Paris; Battle of Villiers; World War I
- Awards: Chevalier of the Legion of Honour

Général Victor-Constant Michel (30 January 1850 – 8 November 1937) was a French general officer. He led the French Army in 1911, but following his opposition to the French strategy for war with Germany was replaced by General Joseph Joffre in July 1911. In August 1914, he was the Military Governor of Paris, but was replaced later that month by General Joseph Gallieni.

== Early career ==
Michel was born in the village of Auteuil (now part of the 16th arrondissement of Paris), the son of a policeman. He attended the École spéciale militaire de Saint-Cyr from 1867 to 1869. On 1 January 1870, he entered the École d'état-major (Staff College), but the Franco-Prussian War made him leave school in October 1870 to join the 13th Army Corps and he served at the Siege of Paris as a lieutenant. In November 1870, he was assigned to the 3rd Division of the 2nd Army of Paris as a lieutenant. During the Battle of Villiers on 30 November 1870, he was wounded in the face.

After the war, Michel was part of the forces that suppressed the Paris Commune. Michel was appointed Chevalier of the Legion of Honour in May 1871. He returned to Staff College becoming a Captain on 31 December 1873, he joined the headquarters of the 1st Infantry Division in February 1878, and the staff of 15th Corps in April 1880. In February 1882, he joined the staff of General Billot, then Minister of War. In January 1883, he joined the staff of the Military governor of Paris. He was appointed Battalion Chief of the 1st Infantry Regiment in April 1884, then the 43rd Infantry Regiment, he joined the staff of the 1st Corps in 1886, and the War College in 1888.

Appointed Lieutenant-Colonel in 1890, he then returned to the 43rd Infantry Regiment. On December 13, 1893, he was appointed to the staff of the deputy head of the new Minister of War, General Mercier. Appointed Colonel on 26 February 1894, he received the command of the 67th Infantry Regiment. Appointed Brigadier on 28 December 1897, he commanded the 10th and then 22nd Infantry Brigades. Appointed Général de Division on 30 December 1902, he assumed command of the 42nd Infantry Division. On 26 March 1906, he was given command of the 2nd Army Corps and made Inspector of Reserve Regiments. Michel was appointed to the Superior War Council on 22 December 1907, which was largely concerned with strategic planning.

== Chief of Staff and Plan XVII ==
Michel was highly successful in training reservists, a goal that especially appealed to the Republican political element in France. They succeeded in pushing him to the top level. Michel was appointed Vice President High Council of War on 10 January 1911, which made him Commander in Chief designate of the French Army. However, the more conservative elements who largely dominated the senior ranks of the French Army were deeply suspicious of the Republicanism of the reservists, and believed they would be inferior soldiers. They distrusted Michel's competence.

Soon after taking office Michel reviewed the current French Army mobilization and war plan in the event of a war with Germany. Under the current Plan XVI French planners predicted the main German offensive to come in Lorraine with a secondary attack through south-eastern Belgium and Luxembourg towards Mézières. Plan XVI specified the response: a French offensive to retake Alsace through two lines of advance, one on the right between the Vosges and the Moselle below Toul the other, on the left, north of a line Verdun–Metz. Michel, by contrast, correctly predicted the main elements of the German Schlieffen Plan. He argued that the major German offensive would probably come through central Belgium, because of the obstacle of French defences in Lorraine, the terrain in eastern Belgium and German railway building. At a meeting of the Superior War Council on 19 July 1911 he presented these views and proposed a new strategy to be called Plan XVII—a defensive strategy of deploying a large defensive force on a line Verdun-Namur-Antwerp to counter the anticipated German offensive. Michel's plan called for 1,290,000 men to defend against the expected German invasion through Belgium. There would be 770,000 men in two "Mass of Maneuver" formations along the Belgian border, backed by a reserve of 220,000 men centered around Paris. The third Mass of Maneuver, of 300,000 men, would be along the German border. In order to field an army of that size, French reserve units would need to be integrated with the active army immediately on mobilisation. Although Michel was prescient in predicting the German plans, his appreciation of artillery was deficient, and France entered the war with a severe weakness in long-range artillery tubes and shells.

Michel's proposal was met with hostility by conservatives in the French government and Army, who were alarmed at Michel's dependence on the use of reserves, which would dilute the power of the conservative officer corps. They denied that Germany would be aggressive and violate the neutrality of Belgium, a supposedly-friendly power, whose neutrality had been guaranteed by Britain. They complained that Michel's approach was strategically too defensive and ran against the French Army's offensive spirit. War Minister Adolphe Messimy stood opposed.

On 28 July 1911, Messimy replaced Michel with Joffre and dismissed Michel from the Supreme War Council. The new Plan XVII drafted by Joseph Joffre was now adopted, rejected Michel's ideas and emphasised a massive French attack in Lorraine. Michel was then appointed military governor of Paris, where he would not have responsibility for strategy.

== World War I ==
Despite his vindication as to German intentions, General Michel's service in World War I was short: less than a month. On 26 August 1914, War Minister Messimy dismissed him as military governor of Paris and replaced him with General Joseph Gallieni. Michel did not receive any command for the remainder of the conflict.

== Later life ==
Michel retired to Meulan, where he died on 8 November 1937.

== Bibliography ==
- Cole, Ronald H (1979). "Victor Michel: the unwanted clairvoyant of the French high command". Military Affairs. 43 (4): 199–201. doi:10.2307/1986754. ISSN 0026-3931. JSTOR 1986754.
- Doughty, Robert Allan (2005). Pyrrhic victory: French strategy and operations in the Great War. Cambridge, Massachusetts: Harvard University Press. ISBN 978-0-674-02726-8.
- Kiesling, Eugenia C (2010). "Strategic thinking: the French case in 1914 (& 1940)". Journal of Military and Strategic Studies. 13 (1).
- Ralston, David B (1967). The army of the republic: the place of the military in the political evolution of France, 1871–1914. MIT Press. ISBN 978-0-262-18021-4.
