= Military governor of Paris =

French army post

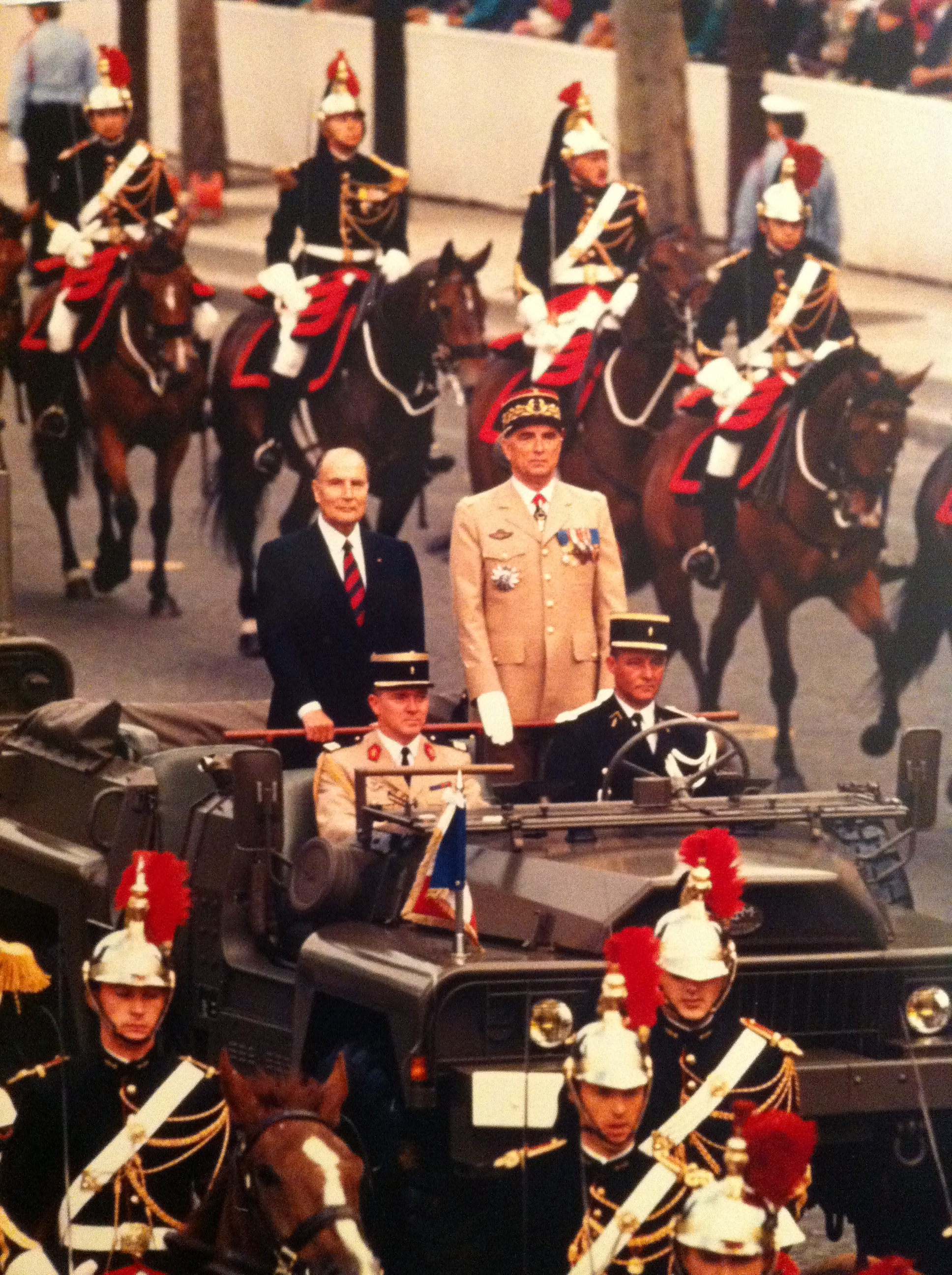
French president François Mitterrand and military governor of Paris Hervé Navereau reviewing troops during the 1989 Bastille Day military parade

The military governor of Paris is a post within the French Army. He commands the garrison of Paris and represents all the military based in Paris at high state occasions. He is also responsible (subordinate to the President of France) for organizing major national ceremonies such as the Bastille Day military parade down the Champs-Élysées.

The foundation of the post is blurred, but it has subsequently evolved in two phases. Under the Ancien Régime, its role was limited in comparison to his colleagues in the provinces, who represented the King of France in his absence, whereas in Paris the King was present. The post was dispensed with at the time of the French Revolution before being re-established by Napoleon in 1804, when it was reinforced by becoming a military-command role.

== List of governors ==
=== Governors of Paris under the Ancien Régime ===
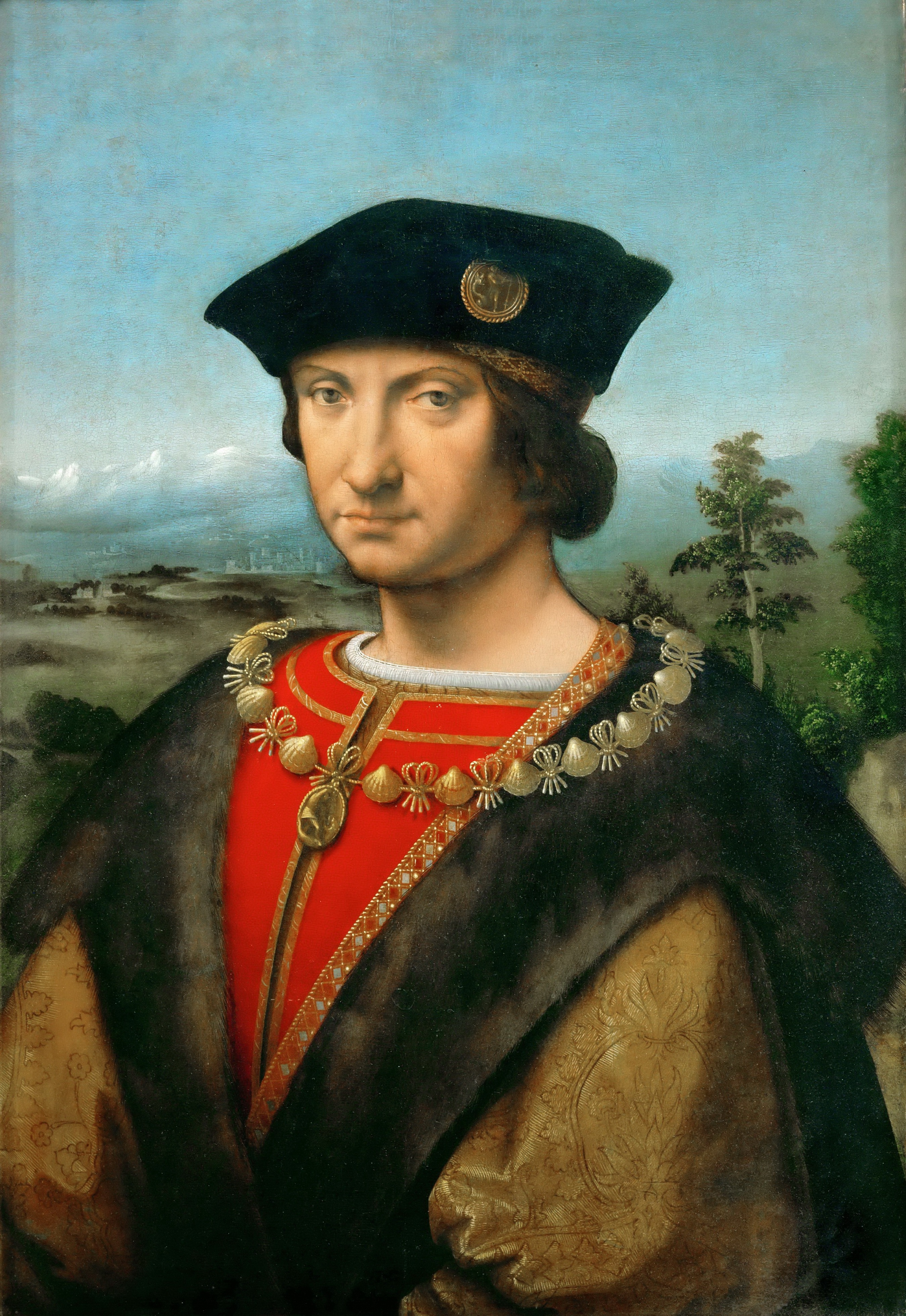
Charles II d'Amboise, governor of Paris from 1493 to 1496

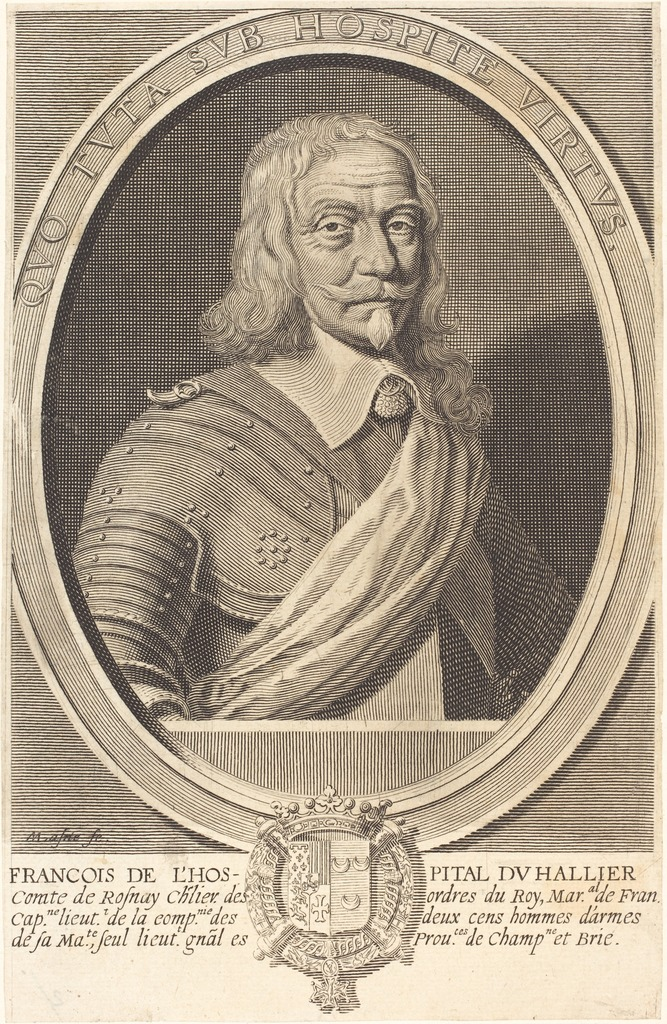
François de L'Hospital, governor of Paris from 1648 to 1657

- Louis I d'Anjou: 1356–1357
- Jean de Berry: 1411
- Waléran III de Luxembourg: 1411–1413
- Jean II de Luxembourg: 1418–1420
- Marshal Jean de La Baume: 1422–142.
- Jean de Villiers: 1429–14..
- Philippe de Ternant: 14..–14..
- Jacques de Villiers: 1461
- Charles d'Artois, Count of Eu: 1465
- Charles de Melun, Baron of the Landes and of Normanville: 1465–1467
- Charles I d'Amboise, Count of Brienne: 1467–1470
- Charles de Gaucourt, Viscount of Aix: 14..–1472
- Antoine de Chabannes, Count of Dammartin: 1472–147.
- Guillaume de Poitiers, Seigneur de Clérieux: 1478–14..
- Louis d'Orléans: 1483–1485
- Antoine de Chabannes, Count of Dammartin: 1485–1488
- Gilbert de Montpensier: 14..–1494
- Charles II d'Amboise: 1493–1496
- Antoine de La Rochefoucauld, Lord of Barbezieux: 15..–15..
- Marshal Paul de Thermes: 1559–1562
- Marshal Charles de Cossé: 1562–1563
- Marshal François de Montmorency: 15..–1572
- René de Villequier, Viscount of La Guerche: 1580
- François d'O: 158.–1589
- Charles-Emmanuel de Savoie: 1589–1590
- Jean-Francois de Faudoas: 1590–1594
- Charles II de Cossé, Marshal of the league: 1594
- François d'O: 1594
- Charles du Plessis: 1616
- Hercule de Rohan, Duke of Montbazon: 1643–16..
- Marshal François de L'Hospital: 1648–1657
- Maréchal de Camp Ambroise-François de Bournonville: 1657–1662
- Marshal Antoine d'Aumont, Marquis of Villequier: 1662–1669
- Gabriel de Rochechouart, Duke of Mortemart: 1669–1675
- Charles III de Créquy, Duke of Poix: 1676–1687
- Léon Potier, Duke of Gesvres: 1687–1704
- François-Bernard Potier, Duc de Tresmes: 1704–1739
- Bernard Potier, Duke of Gesvres: 1739–1757
- Charles Louis d'Albert, Duke of Chevreuse and of Luynes: 1757–1771
- Marshal Jean de Cossé-Brissac: 1771–1780
- Maréchal de Camp Louis de Cossé-Brissac: 1780–1791

=== General commanders of the Armed Forces in Paris ===
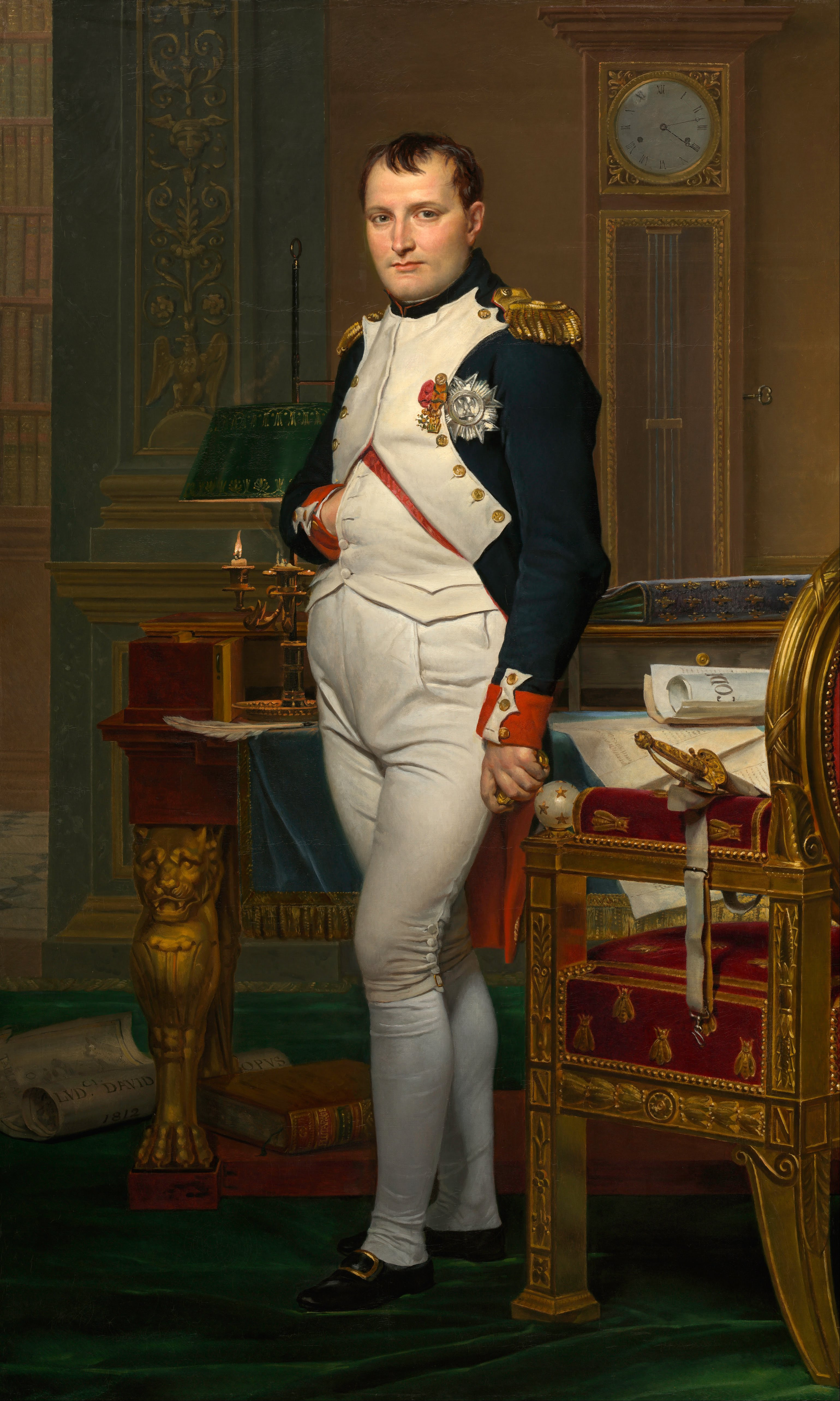
Emperor Napoléon Bonaparte, commander of the Armed Forces in Paris from 1795 to 1796

- General Louis-Auguste-Augustin d'Affry: 1791–1792
- General Jacques-François de Menou: 1792–1794
- General Jean Thierry: 1794–1795
- General Jacques-François de Menou: 1795
- General Paul de Barras: 1795
- General Napoléon Bonaparte: 1795–1796
- General Jacques Maurice Hatry: 1796–1797
- General Pierre Augereau: 1797
- General Louis Lemoine: 1797
- General Jean-François Moulin: 1797–1798
- General Joseph Gilot: 1798–1799
- General Barthélemy Catherine Joubert: 1799
- General Jean-Antoine Marbot: 1799
- General François Joseph Lefebvre: 1799–1800
- General Édouard Mortier: 1800–1803
- General Jean-Andoche Junot: 1803–1804

=== Military governors of Paris after the French Revolution ===
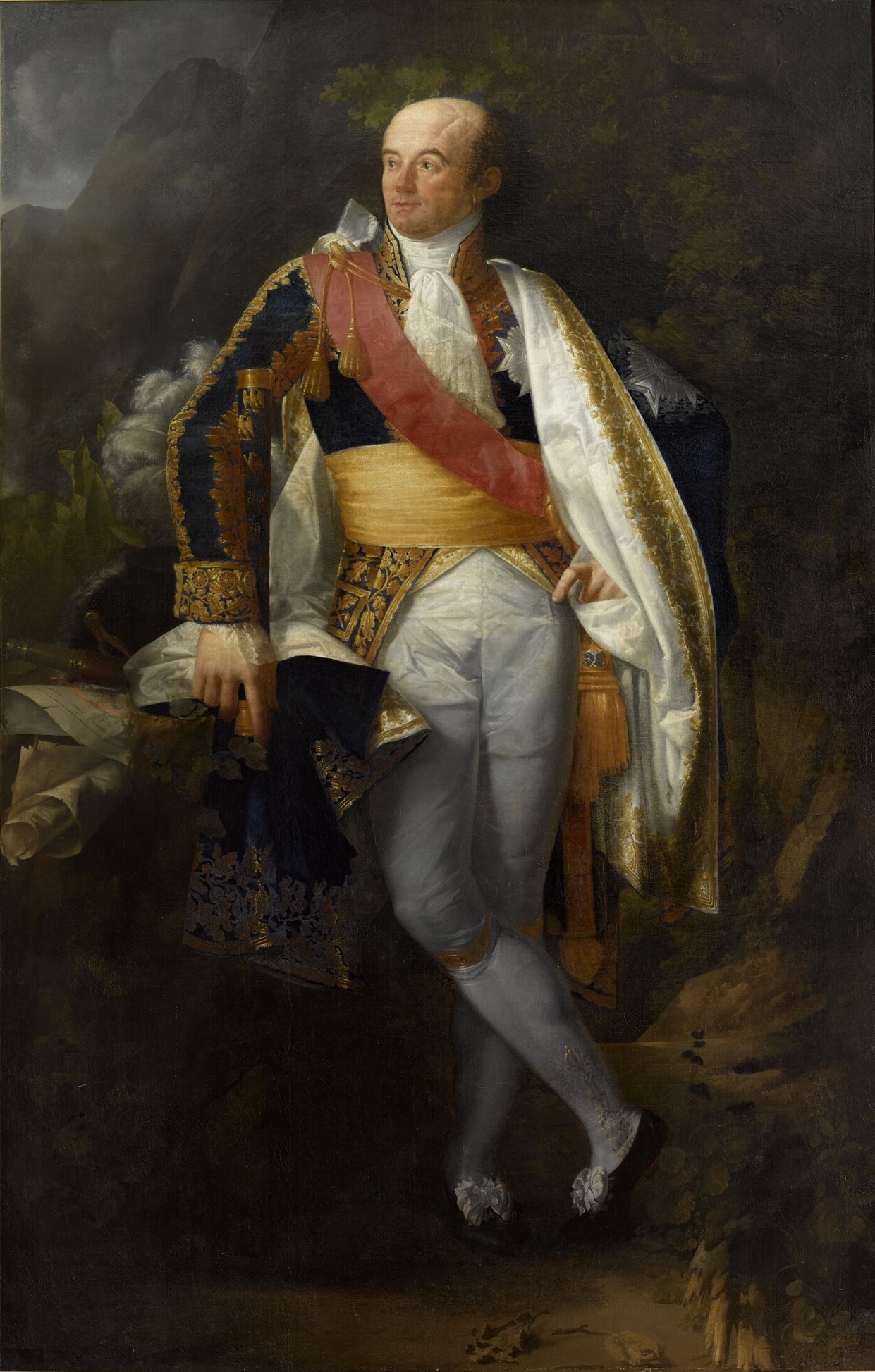
Marshal Catherine-Dominique de Pérignon, military governor of Paris from 1816 to 1819

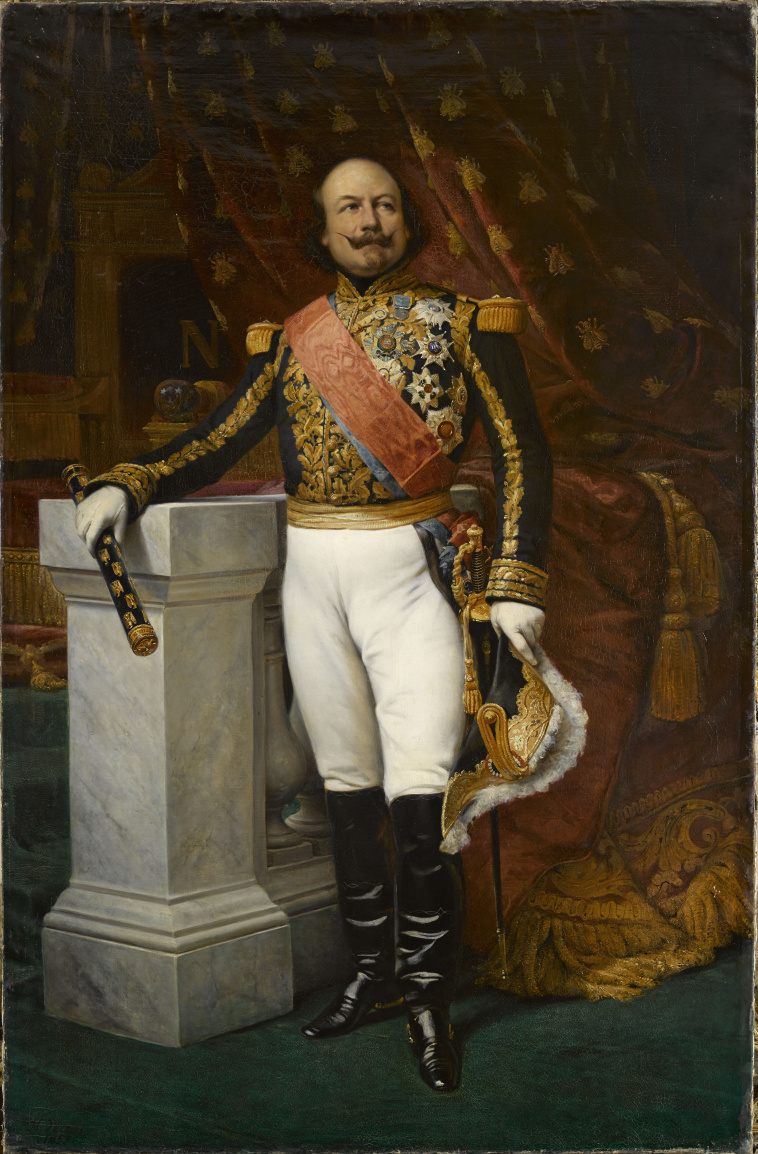
Portrait of Marshal Canrobert by Horace Vernet. Marshal François Certain de Canrobert, military governor of Paris from 1865 to 1870

- General Joachim Murat: 1804–1805
- Prince Louis Bonaparte: 1805–1806
- Marshal Joachim Murat: 1806
- General Jean-Andoche Junot: 1806–1807
- General Pierre-Augustin Hulin: 1807–1814
- General Louis de Rochechouart: 1814
- General Louis Sébastien Grundler: May 1814–January 1815
- General Nicolas-Joseph Maison: 1815
- General Pierre-Augustin Hulin: 1815 (Hundred Days)
- Marshal André Masséna: July 1815
- General Nicolas-Joseph Maison: July–September 1815
- General Hyacinthe Despinoy: 1815–1816
- Marshal Catherine Dominique de Pérignon: 1816–1818
- General Nicolas-Joseph Maison: 1819–1821
- Marshal Auguste de Marmont: 1821–1830
- General Pierre-Claude Pajol: 1830–1842
- General Tiburce Sébastiani: 1842–1848
- General Nicolas Changarnier: 1848–1851
- General Achille Baraguey d'Hilliers: 1851
- Marshal Bernard Pierre Magnan: 1851–1865
- Marshal François Certain de Canrobert: 1865–1870
- Marshal Achille Baraguey d'Hilliers: 1870
- General Louis-Jules Trochu: 1870–1871
- General Joseph Vinoy: 1871
- General Paul de Ladmirault: 1871–1878
- General Édouard Aymard: 1878–1880
- General Justin Clinchant: 1880–1881
- General Alphonse-Théodore Lecointe: 1882–1884
- Divisional general Félix-Gustave Saussier: 1884–1898
- General Émile Zurlinden: 1898–1899
- General Joseph Brugère: 1899–1900
- Divisional general Georges-Auguste Florentin: 1900–1901
- General Paul-Vincent Faure-Biguet: 1901–1903
- General Jean Dessirier: 1903–1906
- General Jean-Baptiste Dalstein: 1906–1910
- General Michel-Joseph Maunoury: 1910–1912
- General Victor-Constant Michel: 1912–1914
- Général de division Joseph Gallieni: 1914–1915
- General Michel-Joseph Maunoury: 1915–1916
- General Augustin Dubail: 1916–1918
- General Adolphe Guillaumat: 1918
- General Charles Emile Moinier: 1918–1919
- General Pierre Berdoulat: 1919–1923
- General Henri Gouraud: 1923–1937
- General Gaston Billotte: 1937–1939
- General Pierre Héring: 1939–1940
- General Henri Dentz: June 1940

=== Military governors of Paris under the German occupation ===
Under the German occupation of France, Paris had at least three German military governors:

- General Otto von Stülpnagel
- General Carl-Heinrich von Stülpnagel, cousin of the former
- General Dietrich von Choltitz

=== Military governors of Paris since 1944 ===
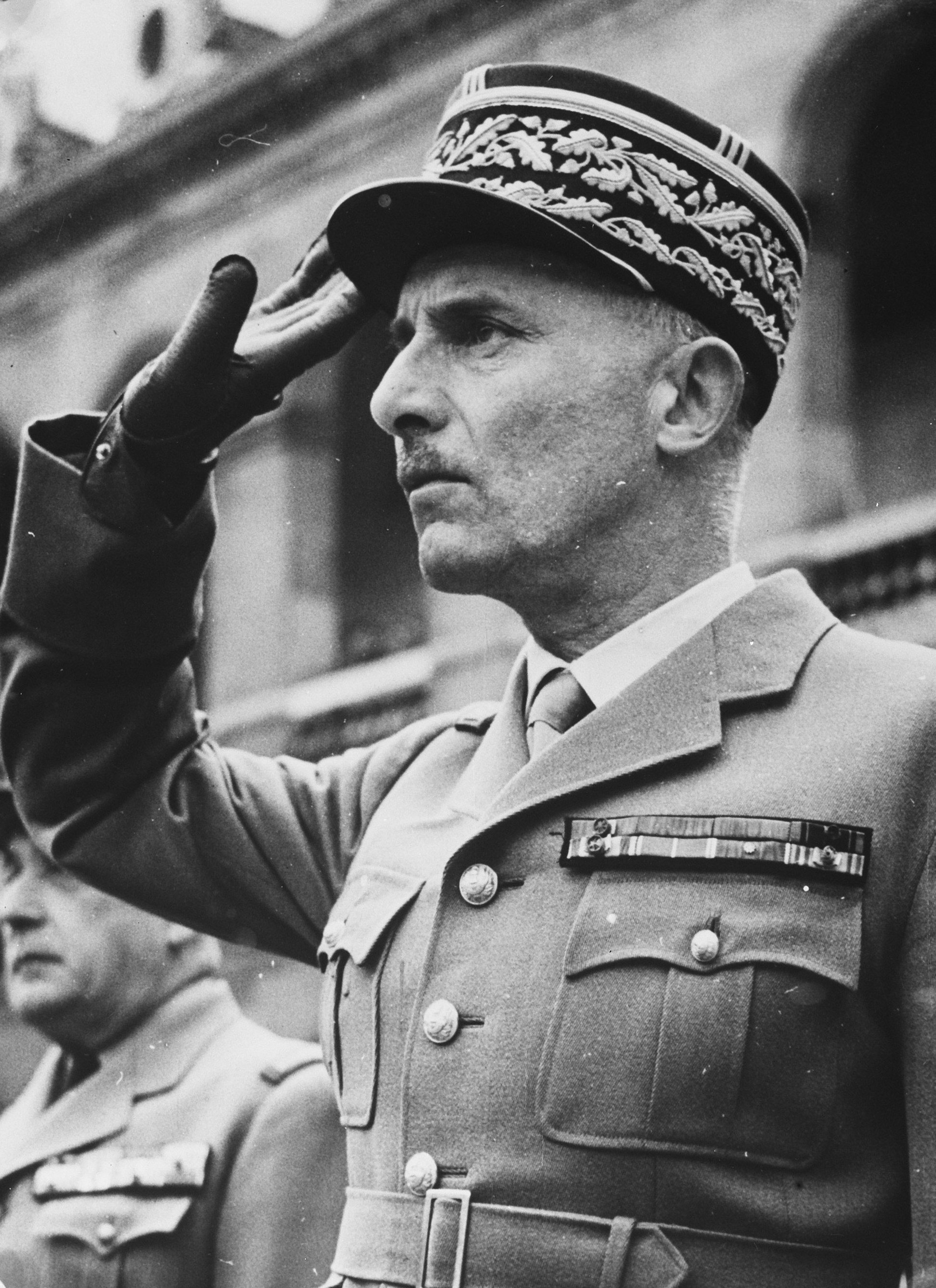
General Henri Zeller, military governor of Paris from 1953 to 1957

- General Philippe Leclerc: 1944
- General Marie-Pierre Kœnig: 1944–1945
- General Paul Legentilhomme: 1945–1947
- Army general René Chouteau: 16 January 1947–March 1953
- Army general Henri Zeller: 1953–1957
- General Louis-Constant Morlière: 1957–1958
- General Pierre Garbay: 1958–1959
- General Raoul Salan: 1959–1960
- Army general Maurice Gazin: 1960
- Army general André Demetz: 1960–1962
- General Louis Dodelier: 1962–1965
- General Philippe de Camas: 1965–1968
- General André Meltz: 1968–1971
- Army general Bernard Usureau: 1971–1974
- Army corps general Philippe Clave: 1974–1975
- General Jean Favreau: 1975–1977
- Army corps general Jacques de Barry: 1977–1980
- Army general Jeannou Lacaze: 15 September 1980–1981
- Army corps general Roger Périer: 1981–1982
- Army general Alban Barthez: 1 September 1982
- Army corps general Michel Fennebresque: 1984
- Army general Hervé Navereau: 14 March 1987
- Army general Daniel Valéry: 1 September 1991
- Army general Michel Guignon: 1 August 1992
- Army corps general Michel Billot: 28 October 1996
- Army general Pierre Costedoat: 1 August 2000
- Army general Marcel Valentin: 1 November 2002
- Army corps general Xavier de Zuchowicz: 1 August 2005
- Army general Bruno Dary: 1 August 2007
- Army general Hervé Charpentier: 1 August 2012
- Army corps general Bruno Le Ray: 31 July 2015
- Army corps general Christophe Abad: 31 July 2020
- Army corps general Loïc Mizon: 1 October 2024

== See also ==
- Governor of Les Invalides

== Bibliography ==
- Colonel Gérard Bieuville, sous-lieutenant Pierre Perrier, Les Gouverneurs militaires de Paris, Connaissances et mémoires européennes, Gouvernement militaire de Paris, 1999.
- Tulard, Jean. Murat: Du maréchal d'Empire au roi de Naples. Paris: Marabout, 1983.
