= 77th Infantry Regiment (France) =

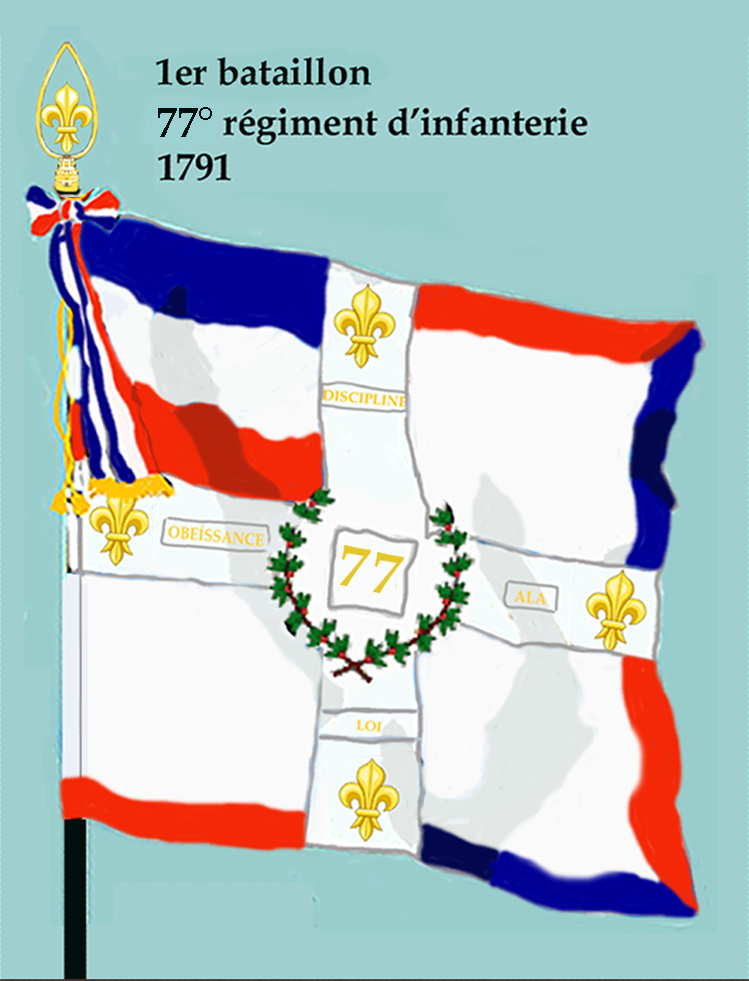

The 77th Infantry Regiment (77^{e} régiment d’infanterie de ligne) is a regiment of the French Army. It was formed on 14 January 1799 during the French Revolutionary Wars, from new conscripts and detachments from existing units of the Armée de l'Ouest. It is designated as the successor of the 2nd Light Royal-Italian Regiment (established 1671) and the Kônigsmarck Regiment (established 1680). The regiment was dissolved in 1940.

== People who served with the 77th Infantry Regiment ==
- Charles Mangin
