= Philippe Coindreau =

French naval officer

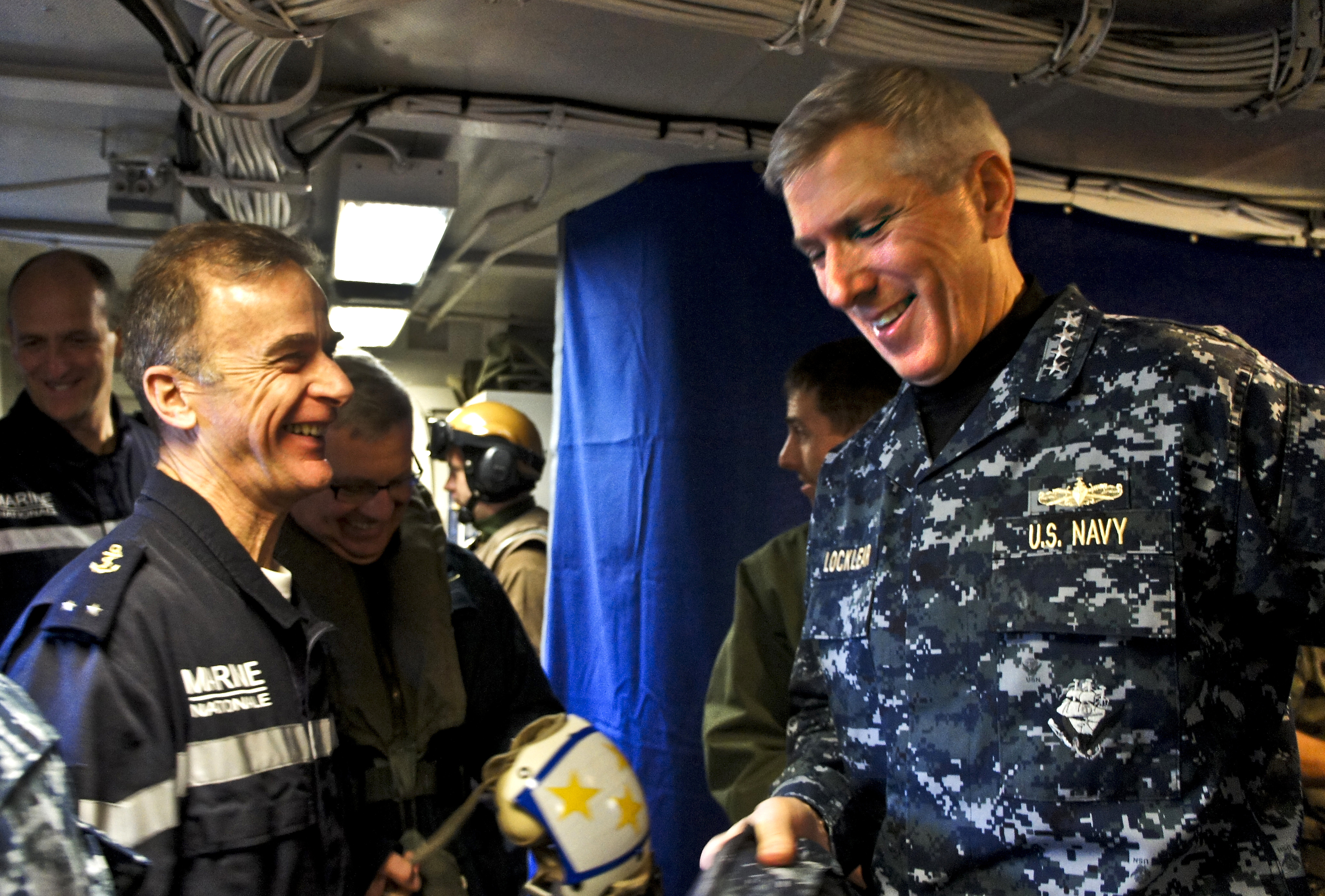
- Born: 12 June 1959 (age 67); Toulon, France
- Military career
- Allegiance: France
- Branch: French Navy
- Service years: 1979 - 2018
- Rank: Counter admiral
- Commands: Major General of the Armed Forces

Philippe Coindreau is a French naval officer. He joined the Navy in 1979 and qualified as a pilot in 1984. He served as Major General of the Armed Forces from 1 September 2016 to August 31, 2018.
