= Hexagone Balard =

French Ministry of Armed Forces headquarters in Paris

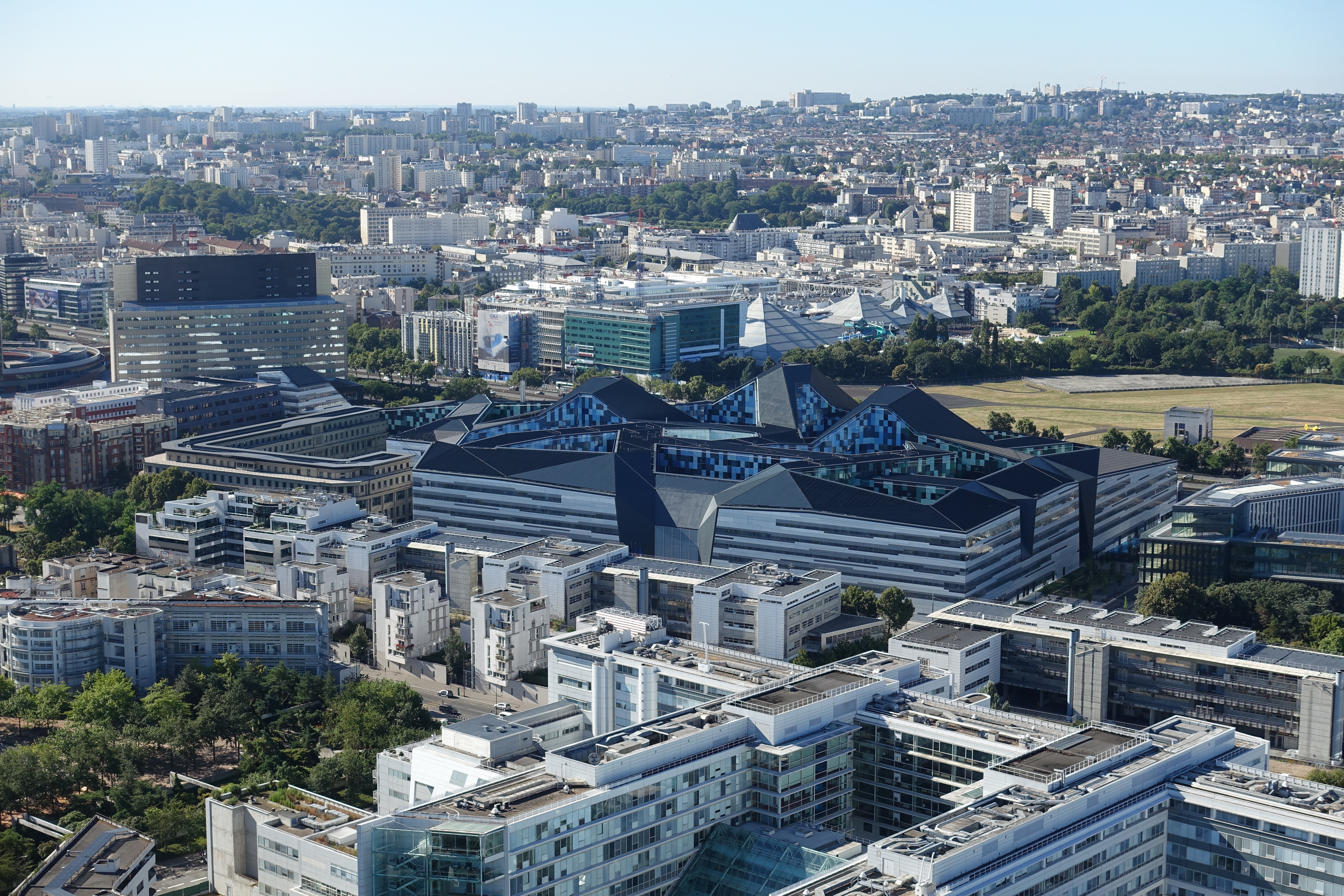
- Hexagone Balard in 2016
- Interactive map of the Hexagone Balard area

General information
- Status: Completed
- Location: Paris
- Coordinates: 48°50′08″N 2°16′34″E
- Current tenants: Ministry of Armed Forces
- Construction started: 2012; 14 years ago
- Completed: 5 November 2015; 10 years ago
- Cost: €4.2 billion
- Owner: French Republic

Dimensions
- Other dimensions: 420,000 m²

Technical details
- Floor area: 13.5 ha

Hexagone Balard (French pronunciation: [ɛɡzaɡon balaʁ, -ɡɔn -]; lit. 'Balard Hexagon') is the headquarters of the French Armed Forces and the Ministry of Armed Forces in Paris. Inaugurated in 2015, more than 9,300 personnel from the Army, Navy, Air and Space Force and Delegate General of Armaments (DGA) have moved into this 165,000 m^{2} (1,780,000 sq ft) white opaque glass-fronted building just northeast of Place Balard, on 41 acres (17 ha), from previously separate headquarters for each service branch.

The Minister of Armed Forces remained in the historic Hôtel de Brienne close to the National Assembly, while the National Gendarmerie remained in the Fort d'Issy just outside Paris. The building's name is a nod to "the Hexagon", a nickname for mainland France. It reportedly cost around €4 billion to build.

== History ==
In 2011, the French Government awarded the Opale-Défense consortium a contract for financing, designing, constructing, operating, and maintaining the complex for thirty years. Agence Nicolas Michelin & Associés designed the seven-story command and control centre, on a former army air base near Balard station in the 15th arrondissement.

As a military base, the command of the site is handed over to the Major General of the Defence Staff, deputy to the Chief of the Defence Staff.

Personnel transferred from historic buildings in central Paris to this site in the south of the city, excepting the Defence Minister who remains in central Paris. Half of the complex is renovation, including an old navy building, designed in 1934 by Gustave and Auguste Perret. The complex boasts a real drawbridge, interior gardens, missile-strike-resistant walls and an underground operational room.

== Appearance ==
Images of the complex (as well as all military-related and sensitive government buildings in France) cannot be seen on Bing Maps, Google Maps, Google Earth, and Google Street View for national security reasons, yet Here WeGo, and Yandex Maps do not censor the satellite image.

Only the faceted roof is visible from the elevated ring road. It has the largest solar panel roof in Paris.

== Headquarters ==
The complex serves as the primary headquarters of the Armed Forces. As such, the entirety of the command structure of the military is housed here:

- Chief of the Defence Staff
  - Major General of the Defence Staff
- Chief of Staff of the Army
  - Major General of the Army
- Chief of Staff of the Navy
  - Major General of the Navy
- Chief of Staff of the Air and Space Force
  - Major General of the Air and Space Force

However, the civil administration of the Ministry and the Minister are still headquartered at the Hôtel de Brienne in the 7th arrondissement of Paris.
