= Henri Zeller =

French military officer (1896–1971)

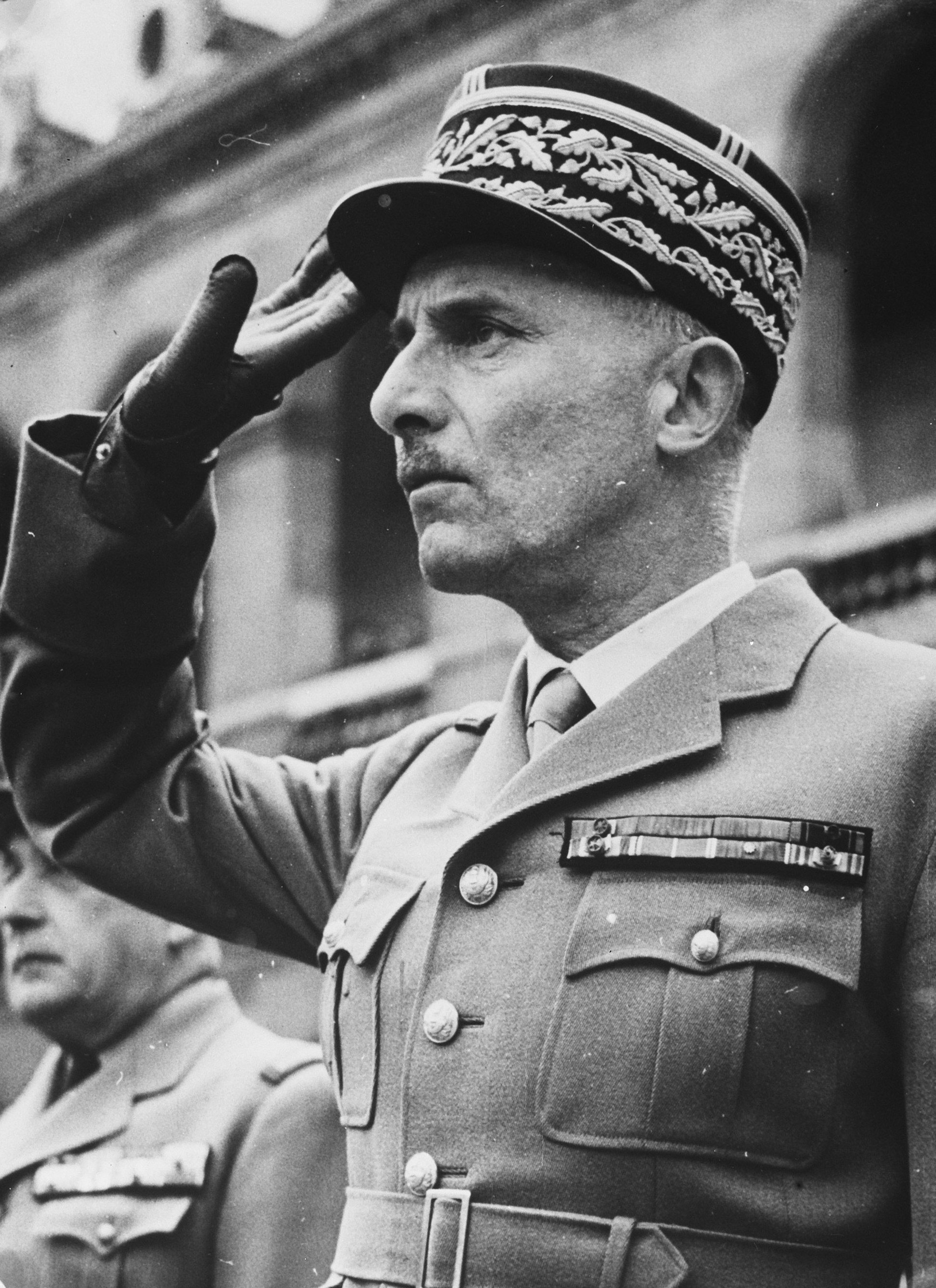
- General Henri Zeller on 23 April 1961.

Military governor of Paris
- In office 1953–1957
- Preceded by: René Chouteau
- Succeeded by: Louis-Constant Morlière

Chief of the Defence Staff
- In office 1 April 1950 – 20 August 1951
- Succeeded by: Charles Léchères

Governor-General of Metz
- In office 1949–1953

Major General of the Defence Staff
- In office 28 April 1948 – 31 March 1950

Personal details
- Born: 18 March 1896 Besançon, France
- Died: 16 April 1971 (aged 75) Paris, France
- Parent: Léon Zeller (father)
- Relatives: André Zeller (brother)
- Profession: Military officer
- Known for: French Resistance

Military service
- Allegiance: France
- Branch/service: French Army; French Forces of the Interior
- Years of service: 1914–1957
- Rank: Général d'armée
- Battles/wars: World War I World War II

Henri Zeller (born 18 March 1896, Besançon, France – died 16 April 1971, Paris, France) was a French Army general and member of the Resistance organization of the French Army during World War II.

== Biography ==
In the last days of July 1914, aged 18, Zeller obtained from his father, future général de division Léon Zeller, an authorization to enlist in the French Army for the duration of World War I. He participated in the war as an artilleryman.

During World War II Zeller was responsible for hiding materiel once France signed an armistice with Germany on 22 June 1940 and with Italy on 24 June 1940. After 1942, he was part of the Resistance organization of the French Army. On 28 September 1943, by which time Zeller was a colonel, the Free French Naval Forces submarine Aréthuse disembarked five agents and picked up seven, including Zeller, at Cap Camarat on the coast of Southern France.

Arriving in Algiers in Algeria in the very first days of August 1944 as a liaison officer, Colonel Zeller, by then head of the French Forces of the Interior (FFI) in the Alps, presented General Charles de Gaulle with the operational possibilities of the French Resistance in the southeast of France. Inland, FFI forces had eroded German military potential. Informed that Operation Dragoon, the Allied plan for amphibious landings in Provence in Southern France in August 1944, provided for reaching Grenoble in 90 days, Zeller replied "What a mistake! From Brignoles to Grenoble, 48 hours will suffice." Convinced, de Gaulle sent Zeller to Naples, Italy, to make his case with General Jean de Lattre de Tassigny, commander of the French First Army and Lieutenant General Alexander Patch, commander of the U.S. Seventh Army, which made up the initial landing force. Zeller declared that throughout the Alps, "the Germans are practically prisoners in their garrisons, from which they only come out in force for their supply or some retaliatory expedition." The two generals took his recommendations into account. In particular, the U.S. Seventh Army, as soon as it landed, rushed towards Grenoble via the Durance valley and the Route Napoléon, and with the support of the Maquis of Drôme and Isère reached it in seven days (and three days after the liberation of Brignoles, 270 kilometres (168 mi) below). These actions allowed the French First Army to ensure the junction with the French 2nd Armored Division — which had landed in Normandy — on 12 September 1944 at Montbard and Nod-sur-Seine.

After World War II Zeller served as Major General of the Defence Staff from 28 April 1948 to 31 March 1950, then as Combined Chief of the Defence Staff from 1 April 1950 to 20 August 1951. He was appointed military governor of Metz, then from 1953 to 1957 served as military governor of Paris. Passing into the military reserve after that, he was awarded the Grand Cross of the Legion of Honour by Marshal Alphonse Juin on 1 February 1958.

== Honors and awards ==
- Croix de guerre 1914–1918 (three citations)
- Croix de Guerre 1939–1945 (two citations)
- Grand Cross of the Legion of Honour (as général d'armée)
- Resistance Medal
- Distinguished Service Order (United Kingdom)
- Commander of the Order of the British Empire (United Kingdom)
- Grand Officer of the Order of Merit of the Italian Republic (Italy, 20 April 1956)
