= André Demetz =

French general (1902–1977)

André Demetz

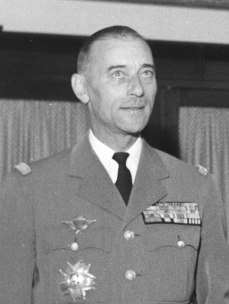
- André Demetz
- Born: 10 December 1902; Dijon, France
- Died: 17 November 1977 (aged 74); Monthelon, France
- Military career
- Allegiance: (France) French Army
- Rank: Army General (France)
- Commands: 2nd Dragoon Regiment (1944); 25th Airborne Division (1946); 1st Armored Division (1952); 6th Military Region (1956); Military Governor of Paris (1960)
- Conflicts: World War II: Dragoon; Alsace 1944–1945; Southern Germany 1945

André Demetz (1902–1977) was a French general, who fought in World War II and later rose to high rank after the war. Demetz was the first commander of the 25th Airborne Division during a period in which the French Army was redefining itself following the defeats and internal conflicts of World War II. He later commanded a military region, was Military Governor of Paris, and also served as the Chief of Staff for Administration and Logistics at NATO Headquarters.
