= Battle of the Ailette =

1918 battle of the First World War

- Part of the Hundred Days Offensive on the Western Front of World War I
Date	17–23 August 1918
Location	Ailette, Aisne, France
Result	French victory

Belligerents
German Empire	French Republic

Commanders and leaders
(German Empire) Johannes von Eben	(French Third Republic) Charles Mangin

Units involved
(German Empire) 9th Army	(French Third Republic) Tenth Army

The Battle of the Ailette took place during the First World War in August 1918, on the banks of the Ailette between Laon and Aisne.

== Background ==
After the Battle of Amiens, the forces of the Entente, led by Marshal Foch, planned a large-scale offensive on the German lines in France, the various lines of advance converging on Liège in Belgium.

Blocking the road to Paris between the Somme and Aisne, the Ailette and its canal linking the Oise and Aisne served as retrenchment for a number of soldiers of the Imperial German Army. Though it was a largely unknown battle of the Hundred Days Offensive during the First World War, the Ailette was the scene of fierce fighting between the French and German forces for its control from August to September 1918, before it returned to the French in October.

== The battle ==
- August 15 - Having noticed that Von Eben's army is widely spread from Audignicourt to Morsain, Mangin decides to take advantage of it. So on August 17, at 5 am he attacks and seizes a position around Autrêches with the French 7th and 30 Army Corps. The next day at 6 o'clock in the evening, they assault 10 km of front and advance 2 km taking 2,000 prisoners while losing 60 killed and 300 wounded, having thus approached von Eben's first line.
- August 19 - In the evening, Mangin holds a line through Bailly - Tracy-le-Val, west of Nampcel, Audignicourt, Vassens, Morsain, Nouvron, Vingre and Fontenoy.
- 20 August - On the right, north-west of Soissons, Tartiers is taken; in the center the infantrymen gained access to the plateau of Audignicourt and took Lombray and Blérancourdelle while on the left, despite relentless resistance, the Germans retreat towards Ourscamp. During these maneuvers 8,000 prisoners are taken. Nampcel, Carlepont, and Caisnes are regained.
- August 21 - With the support of tanks, Cuts is captured, lost and recaptured. Blérancourt is taken after a hard fight. On the road to Noyon between Sampigny and Pontoise, a raid reached the Oise and gained the woods of Carlepont and Ourscamps by threatening to surround them across the Oise, and the rest of the Lassigny massif that Humbert (3rd army) will occupy bordering Divette.
- August 22 - The 1st Bavarian Division hastened to the rescue and was attacked; by the afternoon, the French troops advance to the Oise up to Quierzy. On the right, towards noon, they occupy the hill to the east of Pommiers, to the north reach Bagneux and further round Pont-Saint-Mard.
- 23 August - In the evening, after taking Quierzy and Manicamp, Mangin's army borders the Ailette Canal on to Guny and takes the station of Juvigny and the plateau between Cuffies and Pasly.
