= Araba (carriage) =

Turkish carriage

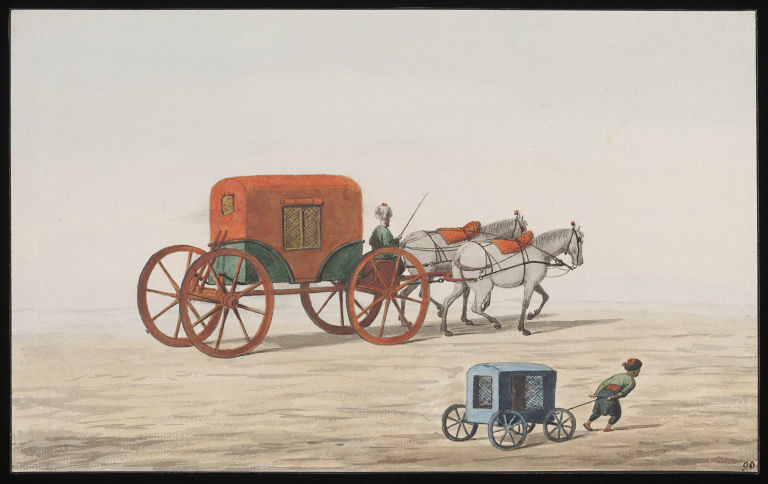
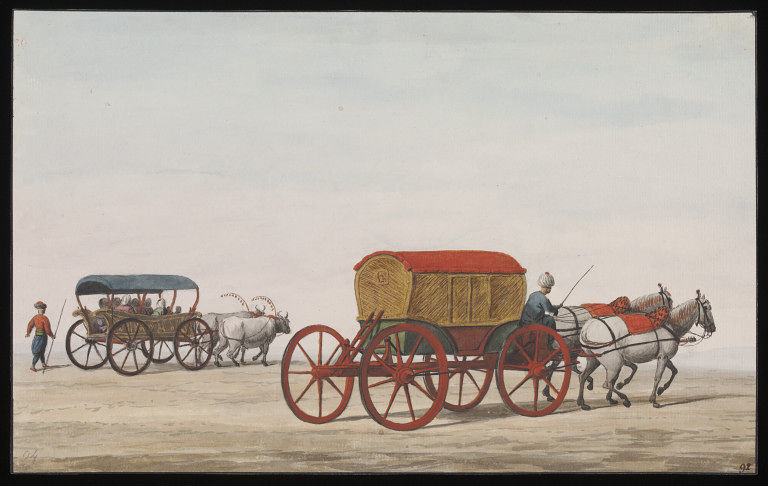
Paintings of arabas depicting Istanbul life around 1809, Victoria and Albert Museum

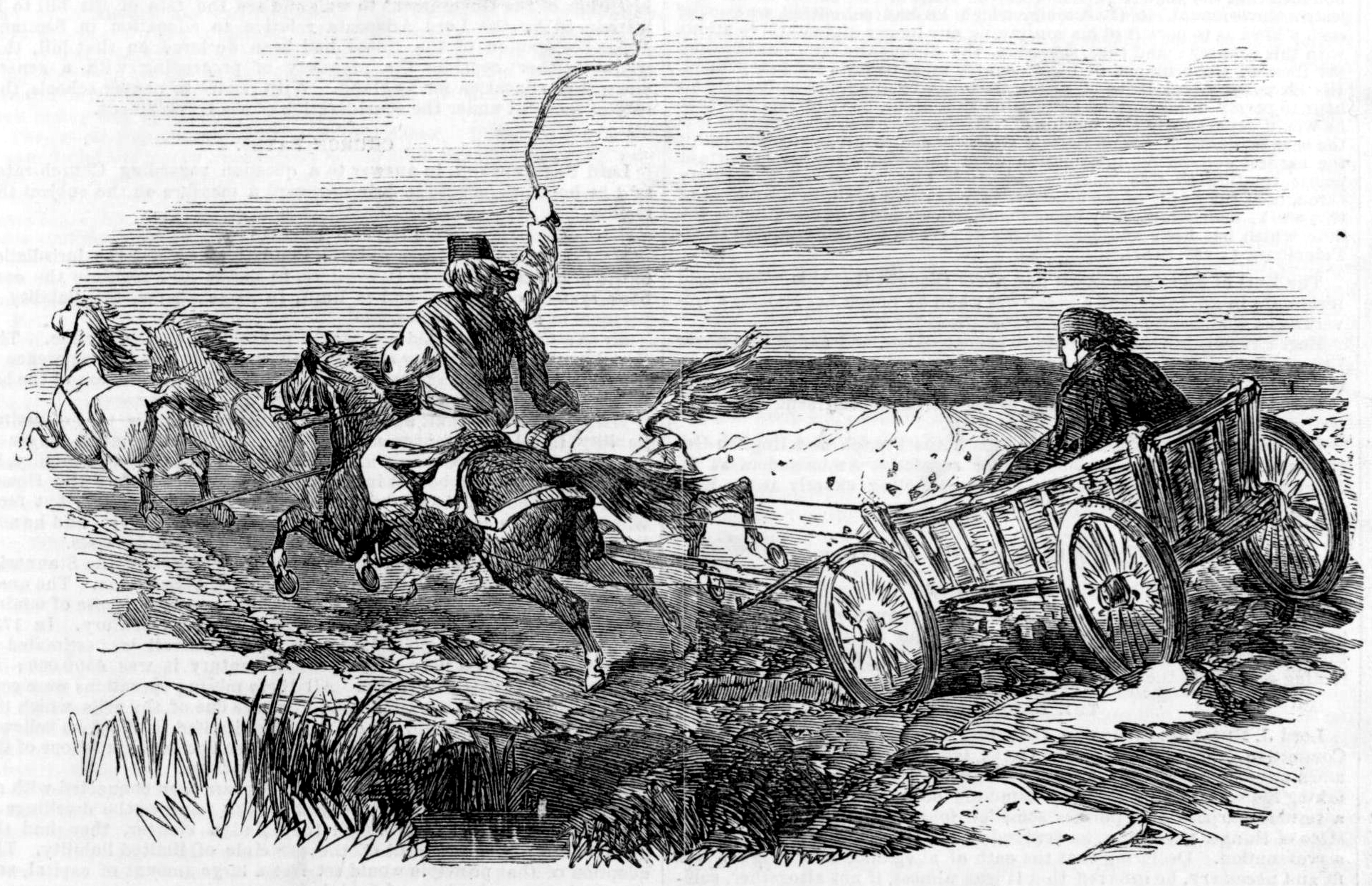
An araba in Wallachia

An araba (from Turkish: araba) (also arba or aroba) is a carriage drawn by horses or oxen used in Turkey and neighboring countries in the 18th and 19th centuries. It featured crosswise seating, typically had a canopy top, and was usually heavy and built without springs; when springed it is called a yaylı, shorter form of "yaylı araba" or "araba with springs".

In modern Turkish, the word araba is used for almost any kind of wheeled device including a hand truck or a car (automobile).
