= Charles Mangin =

French general (1866–1925)

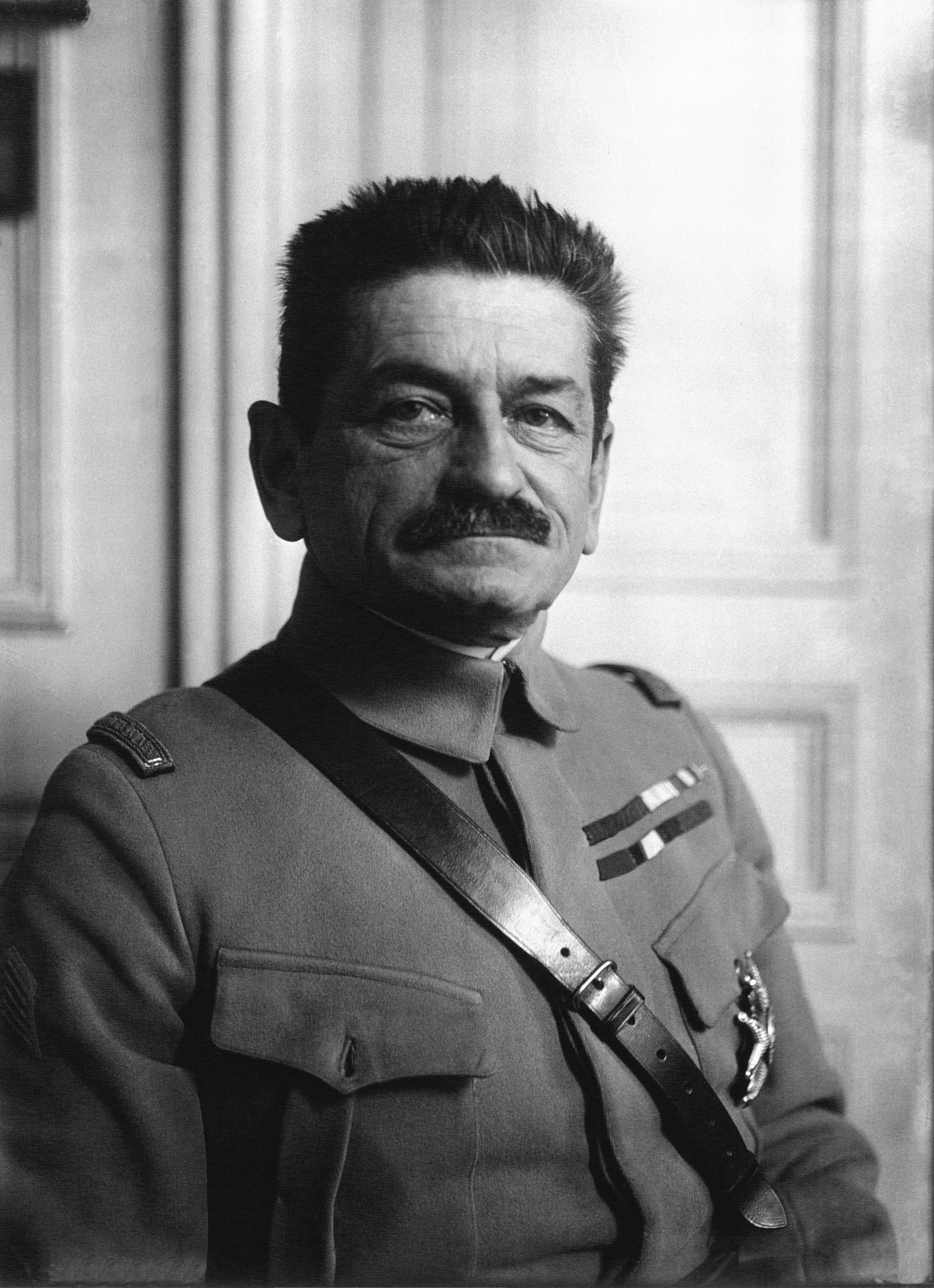
- General Mangin
- Born: 6 July 1866; Sarrebourg, Moselle
- Died: 12 May 1925 (aged 58); Paris
- Military career
- Allegiance: France
- Service years: 1889–1925
- Rank: General
- Nickname: "The Butcher"
- Commands: 11th Army Corps; Third Army, Sixth Army, Tenth Army
- Conflicts: French colonial wars World War I: Battle of Verdun; Battle of the Aisne; Second Battle of the Marne; Battle of the Ailette

Charles Emmanuel Marie Mangin (6 July 1866 – 12 May 1925) was a French general during World War I.

== Early career ==
Charles Mangin was born on 6 July 1866 in Sarrebourg. After initially failing to gain entrance to Saint-Cyr, he joined the 77th Infantry Regiment in 1885. He reapplied and was accepted in Saint-Cyr in 1886 attaining the rank of sub-lieutenant in 1888. He joined the 1st Marine Infantry Regiment based in Cherbourg. He was sent to Sudan, serving under Jean-Baptiste Marchand and gained further experience in Mali, French North Africa. During this period he learnt Bambara, the lingua-franca of Mali. He was wounded three times and returned to France in 1892. In 1893 he was made a Knight of the Legion d'honneur.

In 1898, Mangin joined Marchand on his expedition to Fashoda with children in tow. In 1900 he attained the rank of Officer of the Legion d'honneur. He was given the command of a battalion in Tonkin from 1901 to 1904. He was then promoted to lieutenant-colonel in 1905 and served during the French occupation of Senegal from 1906 to 1908 under General Audéoud. In 1910 he published La force noire, where he called for the use of French Colonial Forces in the event of a European war.

== First World War ==
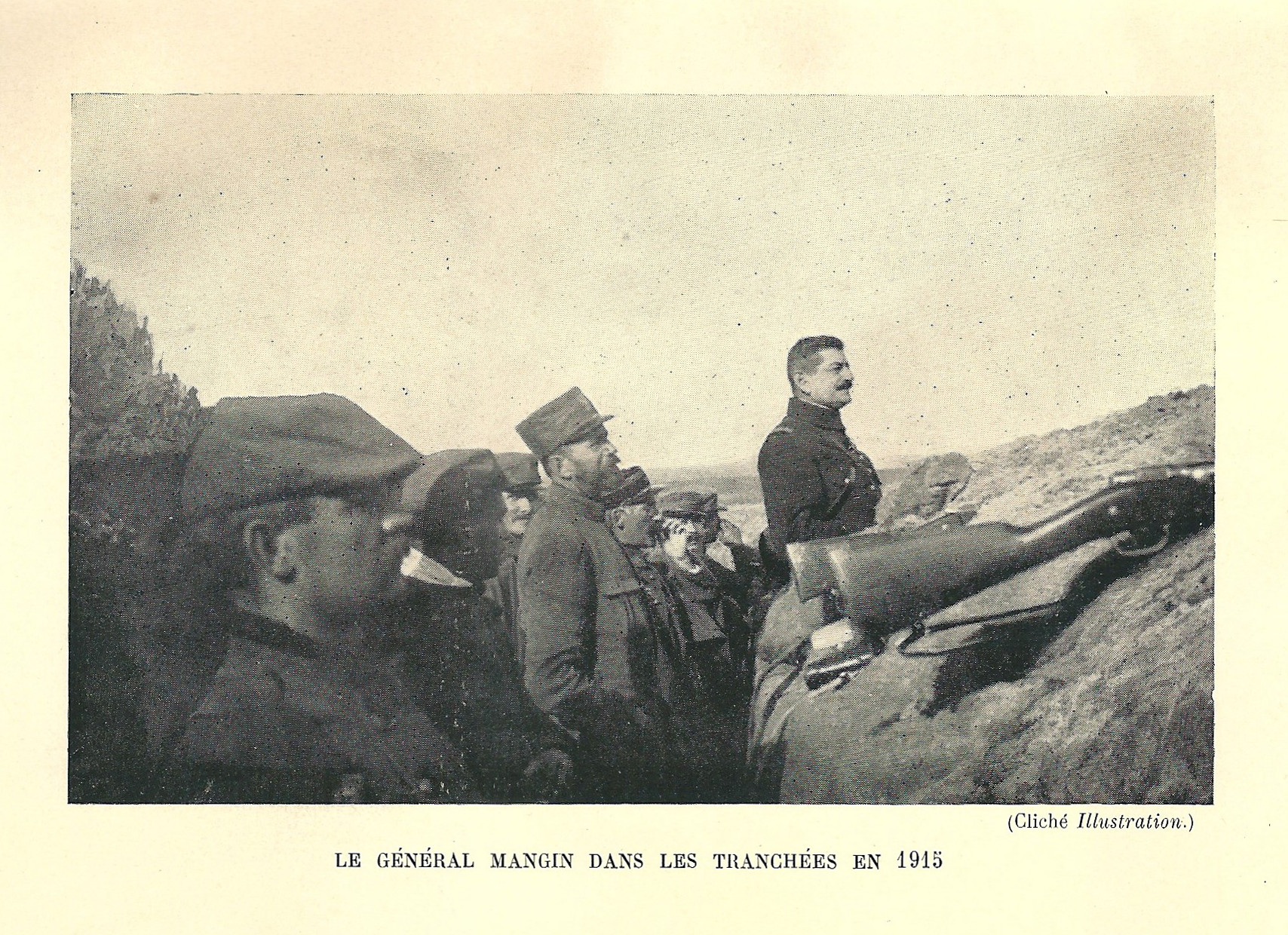
Mangin in the trenches, c. 1915.

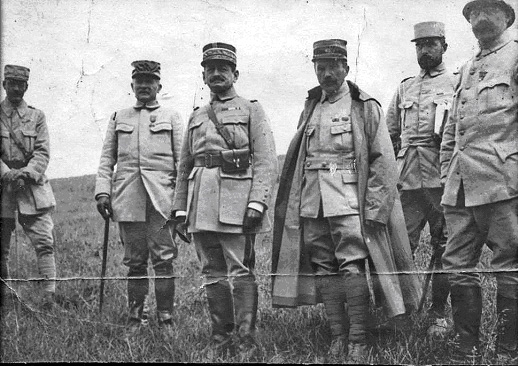
Photograph taken at Fort du Regret (Verdun) in April 1916, showing senior commanders and officers of the 65th Infantry Regiment shortly before entering the front lines at Froide Terre. Mangin is stood third from the left.

During the First World War Mangin rose from divisional command to that of the Tenth Army for the Second Battle of the Marne, commanding both French and American troops. Nicknamed "the Butcher" for his espousal of la guerre à outrance (all-out war) and his faith in the suitability of North African Tirailleur for the attack, there was no doubt in the French Army that Mangin was fearless. Unlike many French generals who did not visit the front, Mangin was shot in the chest while exhorting his men for further attacks during the Second Battle of Champagne, though he returned to duty ten days later. During that war, Mangin had notable victories at the Battle of Charleroi in 1914 and then at the Battle of Verdun in 1916, but his reputation suffered following the disastrous Nivelle Offensive (16 April – 9 May 1917). This was partly because Mangin was one of the few high-ranking French officials who supported Nivelle's strategy.

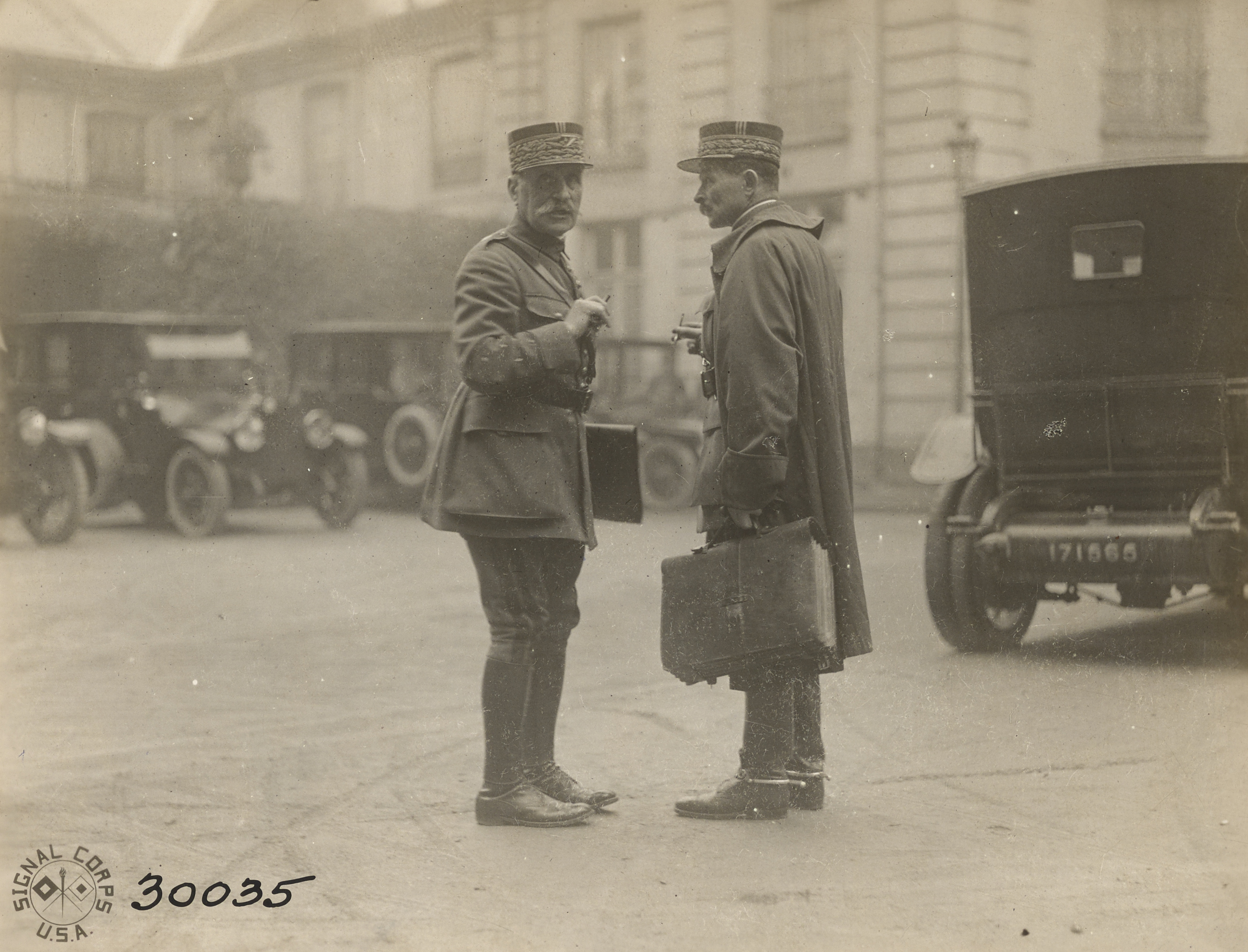
Ferdinand Foch (left) in conversation with General Charles Mangin outside of the Minister of War's office in Paris, 2 November 1918.

Mangin commanded the Sixth Army that bore the brunt of the main attack during the Second Battle of the Aisne, the main component of Robert Nivelle's costly assault. After the failed operation was abandoned, Mangin and Nivelle were sacked. After Ferdinand Foch was promoted to Allied Supreme Commander (over Philippe Pétain), Mangin was recalled upon the orders of the Prime Minister, Georges Clemenceau and given command initially of the 11th Army Corps and then of the French Tenth Army on the Western Front.

The Tenth Army was responsible for the crucial Allied counter-attack at the Second Battle of the Marne. It was this that did much to enhance his military reputation. He also became known for saying "Quoi qu'on fasse, on perd beaucoup de monde" ("Whatever you do, you lose a lot of men"). In the closing months of the war, he served as part of Army Group East (General Castelnau) advancing towards Metz.

The recruitment of African troops in the French Army, which had many opponents, was chiefly the result of Mangin's advocacy. His conception of a "plus grande France" based on political autonomy and military obligation for all parts of the French Empire, is put forward in the concluding chapters of his book Comment finit la Guerre.

== After the war ==
After the Allied victory, Mangin's 10th Army was sent to occupy the Rhineland. There, he became the focus of controversy due to his attempts to foster the establishment of a pro-French Rhenish Republic with the aim of separating it from Germany and thus denying Germany the West bank of the Rhine.

Mangin's 10th Army included Senegalese Tirailleurs sent specifically at his request. A moral panic known as the Black Horror on the Rhine followed. Supposedly, "every German 'knew' that he ordered German mayors to provide brothels for his soldiers, and when the mayors protested at 'providing German women for Senegalese,' Mangin was alleged to have replied, 'German women are none too good for my Senegalese.'"

Mangin became a member of the Supreme War Council and inspector general of French colonial troops. He fell seriously ill at his Paris home on 9 May 1925. Suffering from pain, he became incoherent and partly paralysed. The following day he was diagnosed as suffering from appendicitis and as having suffered a stroke, though it was rumoured he may have been poisoned. He died two days later, on 12 May. His remains were interred in Les Invalides in 1932, and a bronze statue by Maxime Real del Sarte erected in his honour in 1928 in the Place Denys-Cochin, Paris.

Mangin's monument was destroyed on 16 June 1940, two days after German troops occupied Paris during World War Two. During his tour of Paris, Adolf Hitler visited Napoleon's tomb, and the statue, being a reminder of Mangin's machinations in the Rhineland, was one of two he ordered destroyed. The other was of Edith Cavell. A German demolition squad dynamited his statue and most of the bronze was later melted down. In 1957 a new statue was erected on the nearby Avenue de Breteuil.

== Family life ==
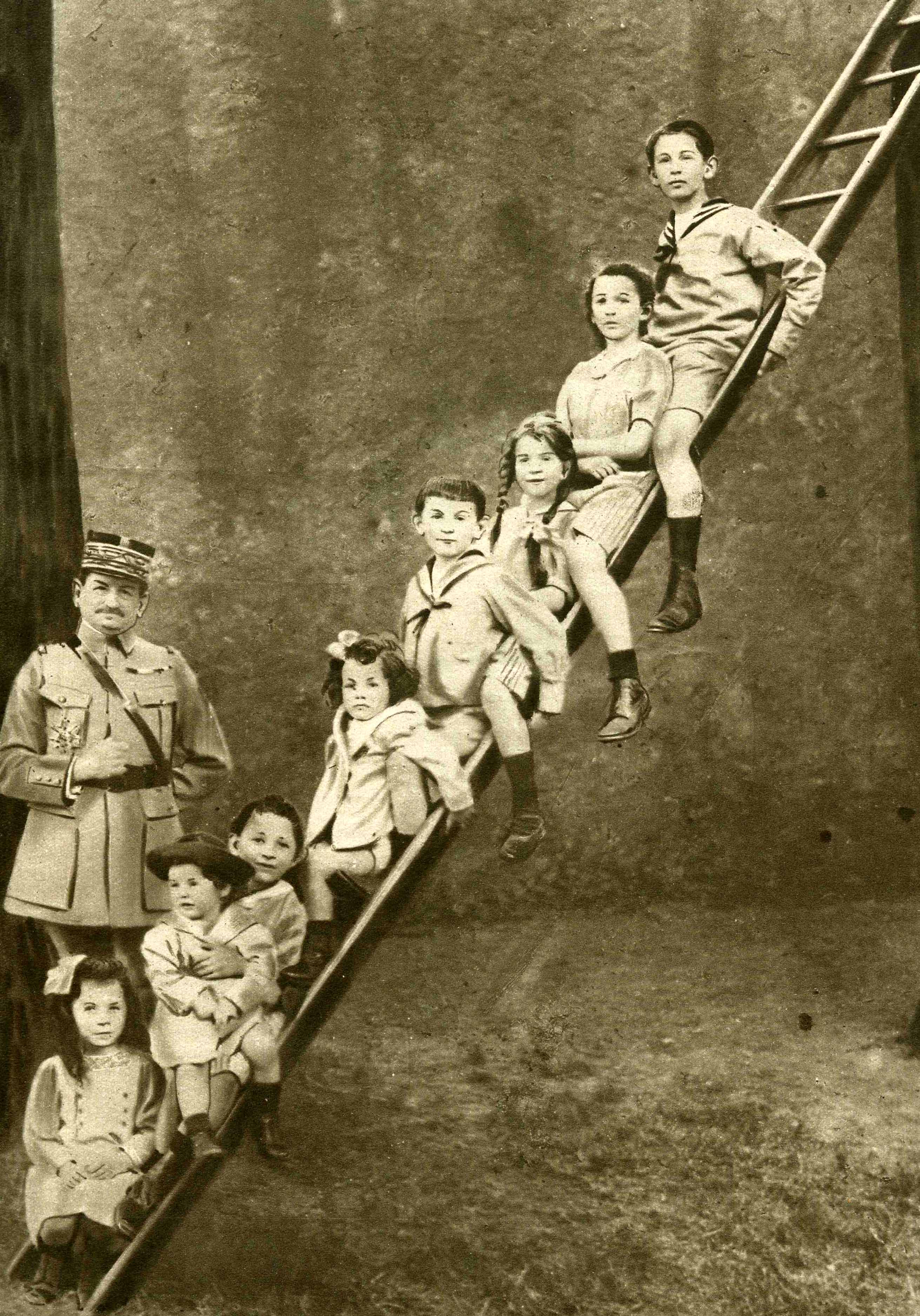
Mangin and his eight children in Mainz in 1919. He was keen for his children to join him during the occupation of the Rhineland.

When Mangin returned from the Merchant mission, he met Madeleine Jagerschmidt, the daughter of a banker. They became engaged just 10 days later and were married in May 1900. However, a year later, his wife died while giving birth to a stillborn child. He was very badly affected, and during the next three years would not respond to anything other than the letters of Madeleine's mother.

In January 1905, Mangin requested an introduction to discuss Tonkin with the nationalist activist and former minister, Godefroy Cavaignac. This was arranged through Marie Georges Humbert, a professor of mathematics at the École Polytechnique the husband of his deceased wife's sister, Marie Jagerschmidt. She gave private lessons to Cavaignac's daughter Antoinette. Following the interview, Cavaignac regularly invited Mangin to dine at his house where his 25-year-old daughter Antoinette was living. Whilst Mangin was impressed by Antoinette's intelligence, he in turn impressed her with accounts of his exploits in the colonies. In June 1905, Mangin proposed and the couple were married on July 31, 1905.

They had eight children together including Stanislas Mangin, a resistance fighter during the Second World War.

== Decorations ==
- Légion d'honneur
  - Knight (30 December 1891)
  - Officer (1 October 1899)
  - Commander (13 September 1912)
  - Grand Officer (2 November 1916)
  - Grand Cross (6 July 1919)
- Médaille militaire (12 May 1925)
- Croix de guerre 1914–1918
- Médaille Interalliée de la Victoire
- Médaille Commémorative de la Grande Guerre
- Médaille Coloniale with "Sénégal et Soudan" clasp
- Grand Officer of the Order of Saints Maurice and Lazarus (Kingdom of Italy)
- Distinguished Service Medal (United States)
- Companion of the Order of the Bath (United Kingdom)

== His publications ==
- La force noire, Hachette, Paris, 1910 (in this book Mangin advocated the quick and massive use of colonial troops, his so-called "Black Force", in the event of a war in Europe)
- La Mission des troupes noires. Compte-rendu fait devant le comité de l'Afrique française, Comité de l'Afrique française, 1911, 44 p.
- Comment finit la guerre, Plon-Nourrit, Paris, 1920, 330 p.
- Des Hommes et des faits. I. Hoche. Marceau. Napoléon. Gallieni. La Marne. Laon. La Victoire. Le Chef. La Discipline. Le Problème des races. Paul Adam : A la jeunesse. Réponse à M. P. Painlevé, Plon-Nourrit, 1923, 275 p.
- Autour du continent latin avec le "Jules-Michelet", J. Dumoulin, Paris, 1923, 381 p.
- Regards sur la France d'Afrique, Plon-Nourrit, Paris, 1924, 315 p.
- Lettres du Soudan, Les Éditions des portiques, Paris, 1930, 253 p.
- Un Régiment lorrain. Le 7-9. Verdun. La Somme, Floch, Mayenne; Payot, Paris, 1935, 254 p.
- Souvenirs d'Afrique : Lettres et carnets de route, Denoël et Steele, Paris, 1936, 267 p.
- Les Chasseurs dans la bataille de France. 47^{e} division (juillet-novembre 1918), Floch, Mayenne; Payot, Paris, 1935, 212 p.
- Histoire de la nation française (publ. sous la direction de Gabriel Hanotaux), 8, Histoire militaire et navale, 2^{e} partie, De la Constituante au Directoire, Plon, Paris, 1937
- Lettres de guerre : [à sa femme] 1914-1918, Fayard, 1950, 323 p.
