= Chief of Staff of the French Air and Space Force =

Head of the French Air and Space Force

Chief of the Air and Space Force Staff
- Chef d'état-major de l'armée de l'air et de l'espace
- Honor flag

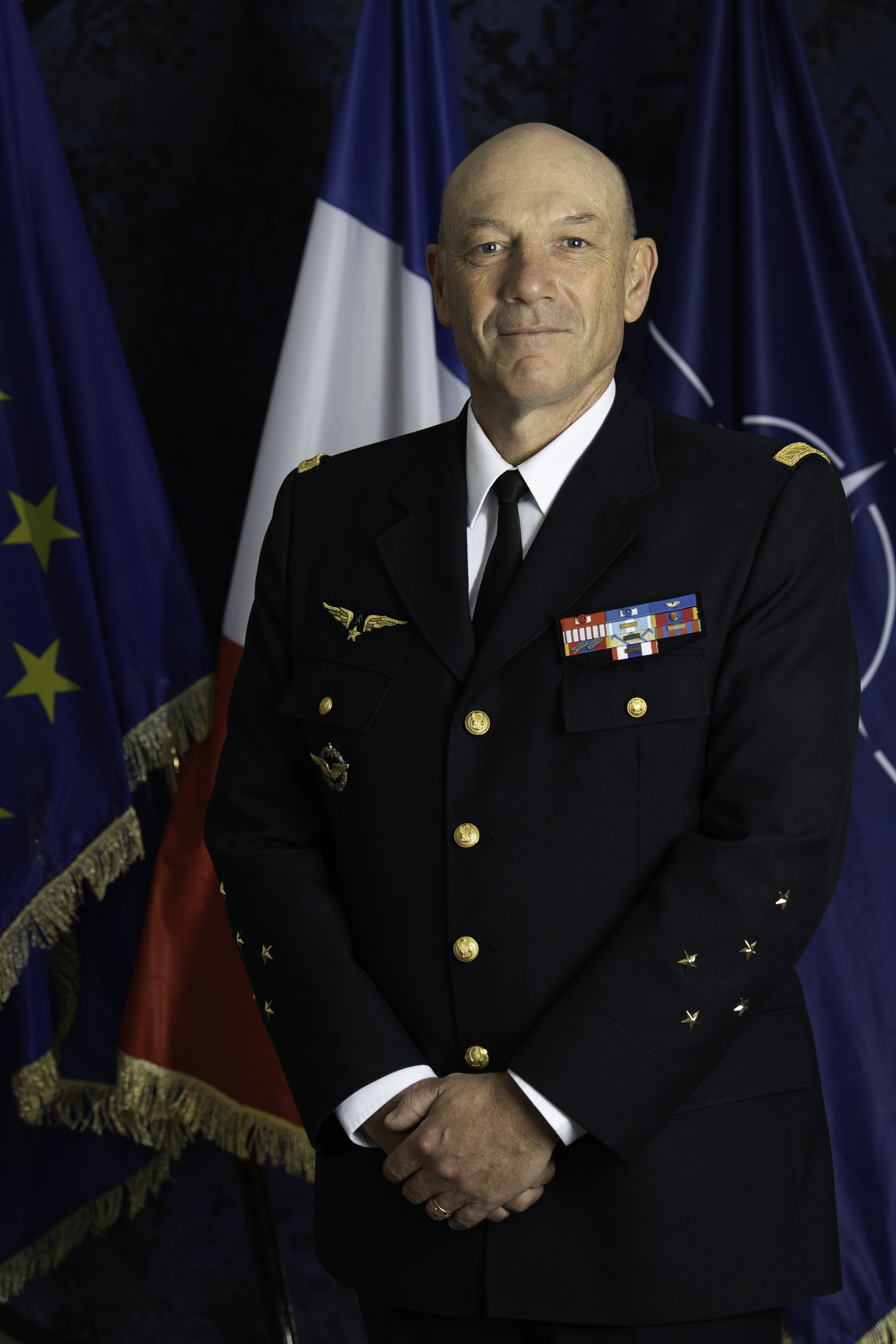
- Incumbent; General Jérôme Bellanger since 15 September 2024
- Ministry of the Armed Forces
- Type: Chief of Staff
- Abbreviation: CEMAAE
- Member of: Chiefs of Staff Committee
- Reports to: Chief of the Defense Staff
- Seat: Hexagone Balard, Paris
- Appointer: President of the Republic; Requires the Prime Minister's countersignature
- Precursor: Director of Military Aeronautics
- Formation: 28 December 1928
- First holder: Henry Michaud
- Deputy: Major General of the Air and Space Force
- Website: defense.gouv.fr/air

The Chief of the Air and Space Force Staff (French: Chef d'état-major de l'armée de l'air et de l'espace, (Note: French pronunciation: [ʃɛf deta maʒɔʁ də laʁme də lɛʁ e də lɛspas], lit. 'Chief of Staff of the Air and Space Army') CEMAAE) is the military head of the French Air and Space Force. The chief directs the air and space force staff and acts as the principal advisor to the Chief of the Defence Staff on subjects concerning the Air and Space Force. As such, they ensure the operational preparedness of their service branch, express their need for military and civilian personnel, and are responsible for maintaining the discipline, morale and conduct of their troops. Special responsibilities can be assigned to them in relation to nuclear safety.

The chief does not have a fixed term, nor an attached rank. In practice, however, a term has never exceeded five years and all chiefs since the late 1940s have been five–stars generals (OF–09). They are assisted in their duties by the Major General of the Air and Space Force who will deputise if needed.

The current chief, General Jérôme Bellanger, has been serving since 15 September 2024.

== History ==
=== Interwar ===
The office was officially created in December 1928 in the 1929 Law of Finances. It proposed the creation of a high command for the Military Aeronautics, still under the authority of the Army, which would succeed the function of the Direction of Military Aeronautics. The French Air Force became independent in 1934, and the Chief obtained full authority.

=== World War II ===
After the armistice, Germany imposed severe restrictions on the size of the French Air Force. As a result, the scope of authority of the Chief was limited, and the office was ultimately eliminated alongside the Air Force.

=== Postwar ===
Free France and the subsequent governments of the re-established French Republic recreated the office at the end of the war.

== Office holders ==
=== Third Republic ===
No.	Portrait	Rank & Name	Term			Minister of Air	Commander-in-Chief	Ref.
No.	Portrait	Rank & Name	Took office	Left office	Duration	Minister of Air	Commander-in-Chief	Ref.
Office established
1		Division general Henry Michaud	1 June 1930	5 January 1931	218 days	Laurent Eynac; Paul Painlevé	Gaston Doumergue	-
2		Division general Joseph Barès	5 January 1931	28 August 1931	235 days	Paul Painlevé; Jacques-Louis Dumesnil	Gaston Doumergue	-
2		Division general Joseph Barès	5 January 1931	28 August 1931	235 days	Paul Painlevé; Jacques-Louis Dumesnil	Paul Doumer	-
3		Division general Lucien Hergault	28 August 1931	16 January 1933	1 year, 141 days	Jacques-Louis Dumesnil; Paul Painlevé	Paul Doumer	-
3		Division general Lucien Hergault	28 August 1931	16 January 1933	1 year, 141 days	Jacques-Louis Dumesnil; Paul Painlevé	Albert Lebrun	-
4		Division general Joseph Barès	16 January 1933	2 April 1933	76 days	Paul Painlevé; Pierre Cot	Albert Lebrun	-
5		Air division general (Note: Division general at the time of his appointment, became Air division general with the independence of the Air Force from the Army.); Victor Denain	2 April 1933	16 February 1934	320 days	Pierre Cot	Albert Lebrun	-
6		Air division general Joseph Barès	16 February 1934	3 September 1934	199 days	Victor Denain	Albert Lebrun	-
7		Air division general Louis Picard	3 September 1934	27 December 1935	1 year, 115 days	Victor Denain	Albert Lebrun	
8		Air division general Bernard Pujo	27 December 1935	15 October 1936	293 days	Victor Denain; Marcel Déat	Albert Lebrun	-
9		Air division general Philippe Féquant	15 October 1936	2 February 1938	1 year, 130 days	Marcel Déat; Pierre Cot; Guy La Chambre	Albert Lebrun	-
10		Air division general Joseph Vuillemin	22 February 1938	...	...	Guy La Chambre	Albert Lebrun	
11		Air army general Louis Picard	...	10 September 1940	...	Laurent Eynac; Bertrand Pujo; Jean Bergeret	Albert Lebrun	- -
11		Air army general Louis Picard	...	10 September 1940	...	Laurent Eynac; Bertrand Pujo; Jean Bergeret	Philippe Pétain	- -

=== French State ===
No.	Portrait	Rank & Name	Term			Minister of Air	Commander-in-Chief	Ref.
No.	Portrait	Rank & Name	Took office	Left office	Duration	Minister of Air	Commander-in-Chief	Ref.
12		Air corps general Robert Odic	10 September 1940	23 September 1940	13 days	Jean Bergeret	Philippe Pétain	
13		Air brigade general Jean Romatet	23 September 1940	21 December 1942	2 years, 89 days	Jean Bergeret; Jean-François Jannekeyn	Philippe Pétain	-
Office disestablished

=== Provisional Government ===
No.	Portrait	Rank & Name	Term			Minister of Air	Commander-in-Chief	Ref.
No.	Portrait	Rank & Name	Took office	Left office	Duration	Minister of Air	Commander-in-Chief	Ref.
Office reestablished
14		Air army general Martial Valin	3 November 1944	1 March 1946	1 year, 118 days	Charles Tillon; Vacant	Charles de Gaulle	- -
14		Air army general Martial Valin	3 November 1944	1 March 1946	1 year, 118 days	Charles Tillon; Vacant	Félix Gouin	- -
15		Air army general René Bouscat	1 March 1946	7 September 1946	190 days	Vacant	Félix Gouin	-
15		Air army general René Bouscat	1 March 1946	7 September 1946	190 days	Vacant	Georges Bidault	-
16		Air division general Paul Gérardot	7 September 1946	15 February 1947	161 days	Vacant	Georges Bidault	-
16		Air division general Paul Gérardot	7 September 1946	15 February 1947	161 days	Vacant	Vincent Auriol	-

=== Fourth Republic ===
No.	Portrait	Rank & Name	Term			Minister of the Armed Forces	Commander-in-Chief	Ref.
No.	Portrait	Rank & Name	Took office	Left office	Duration	Minister of the Armed Forces	Commander-in-Chief	Ref.
17		Air division general Jean Piollet	15 February 1947	1 February 1948	351 days	Vacant; André Maroselli; Pierre-Henri Teitgen	Vincent Auriol	-
18		Air army general Charles Léchères	1 February 1948	22 August 1953	5 years, 202 days	Pierre-Henri Teitgen; René Mayer [...] Georges Bidault; René Pleven	Vincent Auriol	
19		Air army general Pierre Fay	22 August 1953	22 March 1955	1 year, 212 days	René Pleven; Marie-Pierre Kœnig; Emmanuel Temple; Jacques Chevalier; Marie-Pierre Kœnig	Vincent Auriol	-
19		Air army general Pierre Fay	22 August 1953	22 March 1955	1 year, 212 days	René Pleven; Marie-Pierre Kœnig; Emmanuel Temple; Jacques Chevalier; Marie-Pierre Kœnig	René Coty	-
20		Air army general Paul Bailly	22 March 1955	18 March 1958	2 years, 361 days	Marie-Pierre Kœnig; Pierre Billotte; Maurice Bourgès-Maunoury; André Morice; Jacques Chaban-Delmas	René Coty	
21		Air army general Max Gelée	18 March 1958	2 October 1958	198 days	Jacques Chaban-Delmas; Pierre de Chevigné; Charles de Gaulle	René Coty	-

=== Fifth Republic ===
No.	Portrait	Rank & Name	Term			Minister of the Armed Forces	Commander-in-Chief	Ref.
No.	Portrait	Rank & Name	Took office	Left office	Duration	Minister of the Armed Forces	Commander-in-Chief	Ref.
22		Air army general Edmond Jouhaud	2 October 1958	15 March 1960	1 year, 165 days	Charles de Gaulle; Pierre Guillaumat	René Coty; Charles de Gaulle	
23		Air army general Paul Stehlin	15 March 1960	1 October 1963	3 years, 200 days	Pierre Guillaumat; Pierre Messmer	Charles de Gaulle	
24		Air army general André Martin	1 October 1963	27 February 1967	3 years, 149 days	Pierre Messmer	Charles de Gaulle	- -
25		Air army general Philippe Maurin	27 February 1967	13 December 1969	2 years, 289 days	Pierre Messmer; Michel Debré	Charles de Gaulle; Georges Pompidou	-
26		Air army general Gabriel Gauthier	13 December 1969	12 December 1972	2 years, 365 days	Michel Debré	Georges Pompidou	- -
27		Air army general Claude Grigaut	12 December 1972	24 June 1976	3 years, 195 days	Michel Debré; Robert Galley; Jacques Soufflet; Yvon Bourges	Georges Pompidou; Valéry Giscard d'Estaing	-
28		Air army general Maurice Saint-Cricq	24 June 1976	16 July 1979	3 years, 22 days	Yvon Bourges	Valéry Giscard d'Estaing	-
29		Air army general Guy Fleury	16 July 1979	11 June 1982	2 years, 330 days	Yvon Bourges; Joël Le Theule; Robert Galley; Charles Hernu	Valéry Giscard d'Estaing; François Mitterrand	-
30		Air army general Bernard Capillon	11 June 1982	16 October 1986	4 years, 127 days	Charles Hernu; Paul Quilès; André Giraud	François Mitterrand	-
31		Air army general Achille Lerche	16 October 1986	25 April 1989	2 years, 191 days	André Giraud; Jean-Pierre Chevènement	François Mitterrand	-
32		Air army general Jean Fleury	25 April 1989	2 December 1991	2 years, 220 days	Jean-Pierre Chevènement; Pierre Joxe	François Mitterrand	-
33		Air army general Vincent Lanata	2 December 1991	1 July 1994	2 years, 211 days	Pierre Joxe; François Léotard	François Mitterrand	-
34		Air army general Jean-Philippe Douin	1 July 1994	1 September 1995	1 year, 62 days	François Léotard; Charles Millon	François Mitterrand; Jacques Chirac	-
35		Air army general Jean Rannou	1 September 1995	2 July 2000	4 years, 305 days	Charles Millon; Alain Richard	Jacques Chirac	-
36		Air army general Jean-Pierre Job	2 July 2000	1 September 2002	2 years, 61 days	Alain Richard; Michèle Alliot-Marie	Jacques Chirac	-
37		Air army general Richard Wolsztynski	1 September 2002	16 July 2006	3 years, 318 days	Michèle Alliot-Marie	Jacques Chirac	-
38		Air army general Stéphane Abrial	16 July 2006	25 August 2009	3 years, 40 days	Michèle Alliot-Marie; Hervé Morin	Jacques Chirac; Nicolas Sarkozy	-
39		Air army general Jean-Paul Paloméros	25 August 2009	17 September 2012	3 years, 23 days	Hervé Morin; Alain Juppé; Gérard Longuet; Jean-Yves Le Drian	Nicolas Sarkozy; François Hollande	
40		Air army general Denis Mercier	17 September 2012	21 September 2015	3 years, 4 days	Jean-Yves Le Drian	François Hollande	
41		Air army general André Lanata	21 September 2015	31 August 2018	2 years, 344 days	Jean-Yves Le Drian; Sylvie Goulard; Florence Parly	François Hollande; Emmanuel Macron	
42		Air army general Philippe Lavigne	31 August 2018	9 September 2021	3 years, 9 days	Florence Parly	Emmanuel Macron	
43		Air army general Stéphane Mille	10 September 2021	16 September 2024	3 years, 6 days	Florence Parly; Sébastien Lecornu	Emmanuel Macron	
44		Air army general Jérôme Bellanger	16 September 2024	Incumbent	1 year, 356 days	Sébastien Lecornu; Bruno Le Maire; Catherine Vautrin	Emmanuel Macron	

== Free France ==
From its creation in 1940 to the final integration of its air force to the regular French Air Force, Free France had its own staff, based in London. The Free French Aerial Forces were headed by a Commander, responsible to the Commander-in-Chief of the Free French Forces, and was assisted by a Chief of the General Staff.

=== Commanders of the Free French Aerial Forces ===
List of Commanders of the Free French Aerial Forces
No.	Portrait	Rank & Name	Term			Commissioner	Leader	Ref.
No.	Portrait	Rank & Name	Took office	Left office	Duration	Commissioner	Leader	Ref.
1		Vice admiral Emile Muselier	1 July 1940	10 July 1941	1 year, 9 days	Vacant	Charles de Gaulle	-
2		Air brigade general Martial Valin	10 July 1941	2 July 1943	1 year, 357 days	Vacant	Charles de Gaulle	-
3		Air corps general René Bouscat	2 July 1943	3 November 1944	1 year, 124 days	Martial Valin; André Le Troquer; Fernand Grenier	Charles de Gaulle	-

==== Chiefs of the General Staff ====
List of Chiefs of the General Staff
No.	Portrait	Rank & Name	Term			Commissioner	Leader	Ref.
No.	Portrait	Rank & Name	Took office	Left office	Duration	Commissioner	Leader	Ref.
1		Capitaine; Eugène-Marcel Chevrier	1 July 1940	25 December 1940	177 days	Vacant	Charles de Gaulle	- -
2		Lieutenant-colonel; Charles Pijeaud	13 January 1941	31 March 1941	77 days	Vacant	Charles de Gaulle	- -
3		Général de brigade aérienne Martial Henri Valin	31 March 1941	10 July 1941	101 days	Vacant	Charles de Gaulle	- -
4		Lieutenant-colonel; Charles Pijeaud	10 July 1941	1 December 1941	144 days	Vacant; Martial Henri Valin	Charles de Gaulle	- -
5		Colonel; Charles Luguet	1 December 1941	13 April 1942	133 days	Martial Henri Valin	Charles de Gaulle	- -
6		Colonel; Pierre Coustey	13 April 1942	13 April 1943	1 year, 0 days	Martial Henri Valin	Charles de Gaulle	- -
7		Colonel; Georges Andrieu	13 April 1943	3 November 1944	1 year, 204 days	Martial Henri Valin; André Le Troquer; Fernand Grenier	Charles de Gaulle	- -

== See also ==
- Chief of the Defence Staff
  - Chief of Staff of the French Army
  - Chief of Staff of the French Navy
  - Special Operations Command
  - Directorate General of the National Gendarmerie
- Strategic Air Forces Command
