= Victor Denain =

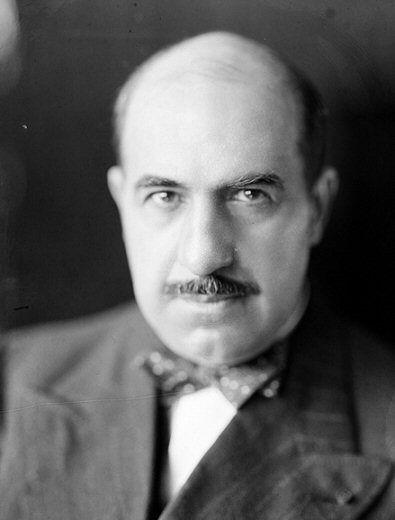
Denain in 1934

Victor-Léon-Ernest Denain (French pronunciation: [viktɔʁ leɔ̃ ɛʁnɛst dənɛ̃]; 6 November 1880 in Dax – 31 December 1952 in Nice) was a French general, aviator and politician. He was behind the creation of the Salon-de-Provence Air School and the general development of military aviation.

== Biography ==
Denain graduated from Saint-Cyr in 1901 and joined the French Army's cavalry. In 1903, he was assigned as Second Lieutenant to the 6e régiment de chasseurs à cheval (6th Cavalary Regiment) and in October 1905, as a First Lieutenant, he campaigned in the southern territories with the 5e régiment de chasseurs d'Afrique (5th Regiment of Chasseurs d'Afrique). In 1915, he transferred to the French Air Force where he commanded the aircraft of the Allied armies on the Eastern Front (1916–1918). With the French Air Force, he served in the Levant from 1918 to 1923, mainly in Syria. As such, he became a protege of General Weygand who arranged a foreign career for him. Denain was Head of the French Military Mission to Poland 1924 through 1931.

From 10 March 1933 to 6 February 1934, General Denain served as the Chief of the Air Force General Staff under Air Minister Pierre Cot, replacing General Joseph Barès. Denain and Cot dealt with the Armee de l'Air's technological issues. They built a series of new aircraft built to make the air services competitive; they worked with French aircraft manufacturers on improvements to aircraft design and production; and they made threats to nationalize the French aviation industry. Denain developed a strategic role for the Air Force with plans in 1933 for equipping it with 1,000 new planes. From 9 February 1934 to 24 January 1936, he was Aviation Minister in the Gaston Doumergue government. During this time, and on behalf of France, Denain announced this his country would organize a Paris to Hanoi air race in 1935, modeled after the London-Melbourne race.

By August 1936, under the Blum government, General Denain, had become High Commissioner of French Morocco. The next year, as Inspector General of the Air Force overseas, he transferred into the reserves. A very skilled pilot, he performed reconnaissance trips on numerous occasions. For example, as Air Minister he piloted his personal Breguet 27 to Belgrade, accompanied by two squadrons of Breguet 27s and a Dewoitine, to attend the funeral of King Alexander I of Yugoslavia on 17 October 1934.

Military offices
| Preceded by Joseph Barès; As Chief of Staff of the Forces Aériennes | Chief of Staff of the French Air Force; 1 April 1933 – 8 February 1934 | Succeeded by Joseph Barès |
