= Joseph Barès =

French military aviation leader (1872–1954)

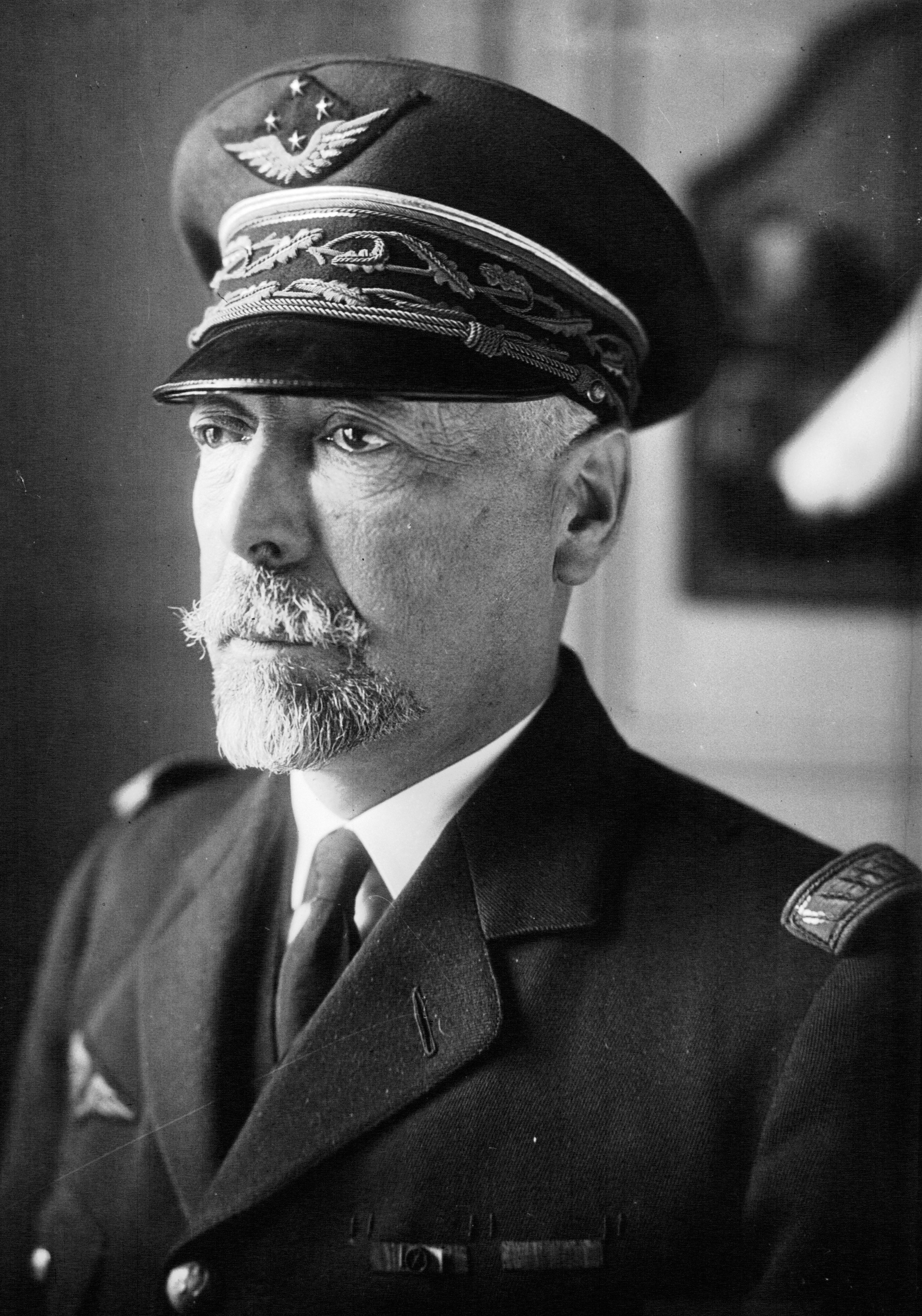
- General Barès in 1933

2nd, 4th, 6th Chief of the Air Force Staff
- In office 5 January 1931 – 28 August 1931
- Preceded by: Henry Michaud
- Succeeded by: Lucien Hergault
- In office 15 January 1933 – 2 April 1933
- Preceded by: Lucien Hergault
- Succeeded by: Victor Denain
- In office 16 February 1934 – 3 September 1934
- Preceded by: Victor Denain
- Succeeded by: Louis Picard

Personal details
- Born: 27 November 1872 Azul, Argentine Republic
- Died: 27 April 1954 (aged 81) Aspet, French Republic
- Parents: Joseph Barès (father); Magdeleine Dhers (mother)
- Education: École Spéciale Militaire; École Supérieure de Guerre

Military service
- Allegiance: (France) Third Republic
- Branch/service: French Navy (Until 1896): Marine Infantry; French Army (Until 1934): Military Aeronautics; French Air Force (1934)
- Years of service: 1892 – 1934
- Rank: Air division general
- Unit: List: 3rd Marine Infantry Regiment; 13th Marine Infantry Regiment; 7th Marine Infantry Regiment; 98th Infantry Regiment; 16th Infantry Regiment; 12th Infantry Regiment; 56th Infantry Regiment; 52nd Infantry Regiment; 1st Engineering Regiment; 6th Infantry Regiment; 154th Infantry Regiment; 108th Infantry Regiment; 49th Infantry Regiment; 24th Infantry Regiment; 34th Air Regiment
- Battles/wars: List: First Balkan War; First World War

Joseph Édouard Barès (27 November 1872 – 27 August 1954) was a French general and a pioneer of military aviation. A veteran of the First World War, he later served three time as Chief of Staff of the French Air Force.

== Biography ==
Joseph Édouard Barès was born on 27 November 1872 in Azul, Argentina from French parents.

Barès entered the École Spéciale Militaire in 1892 and graduated in 1894, choosing the Marine Infantry arm. He was affected to three different regiments and was finally promoted to the rank of Lieutenant. He participated to the Second Madagascar expedition in 1895. He then entered the École Supérieure de Guerre in 1896 where he changed is path of career to the regular Infantry of the French Army. With the development of military aviation, he joined the air service of the Army in several infantry regiments and was made a Knight of the Legion of Honour on 14 October 1911 for his exceptional services to the Military Aeronautics.

On 13 September 1914, General Joseph Joffre appointed Barès Director of the Aeronautical Service (Directeur du Service Aéronautique) at the Grand Quartier Général. A proponent of the offensive against the German Industries, Barès pioneered aerial bombing, but forbade attacks against cities and civilian targets. In September 1915 he was promoted to lieutenant colonel, but with the appointment of General Robert Nivelle as commander-in-chief of the French armies in December 1916, Barès was replaced by Paul du Peuty. On 15 February 1917 Barès assumed the post of air commander of the eastern front, with particular responsibility for the sector of Verdun.

Barès was promoted to Général de Brigade on 20 March 1923 and was put in command of an air brigade. In the 1930s, as a Général de division, Joseph Barès was two times Chief of Staff of the Air Forces, before becoming Chief of Staff of the Air Army in 1934 with its official creation as an independent branch of the French Armed Forces. He retired the same year after more than 40 years of service. In December 1936, then Minister of the Air Pierre Cot awarded him the Military Medal, an honour rarely bestowed on general officers.

Général Barès died on 27 August 1954 in Aspet, France.

== Honours and decorations ==
Ribbon bar	Honour	Date	Source
	Grand Cross of the National Order of the Legion of Honour	4 January 1934	
	Grand Officer of the National Order of the Legion of Honour	7 July 1930	
	Commander of the National Order of the Legion of Honour	26 February 1921	
	Officer of the National Order of the Legion of Honour	3 December 1914	
	Knight of the National Order of the Legion of Honour	14 October 1911	
	Military Medal	15 December 1936	
	War Cross 1914–1918 – Three palms	-	-
	War Cross for foreign operational theatres – One palm	-	-
	Madagascar commemorative medal - Second Campaign Medal	-	-
	White Cross of Military Merit (Spain)	-	-

== Military ranks ==
Cadet	Second lieutenant	Lieutenant	Captain	Battalion chief
28 October 1892	15 September 1894	25 September 1896	9 May 1906	23 September 1913
Lieutenant colonel	Colonel	Brigade general	Division general	Air division general
3 September 1915	25 June 1919	20 March 1923	9 March 1927	18 July 1934

== Bibliography ==
- Le général Barès: "créateur et inspirateur de l'aviation", Nouvelles Editions Latines, 1994
