= Richard Wolsztynski =

Retired French general officer

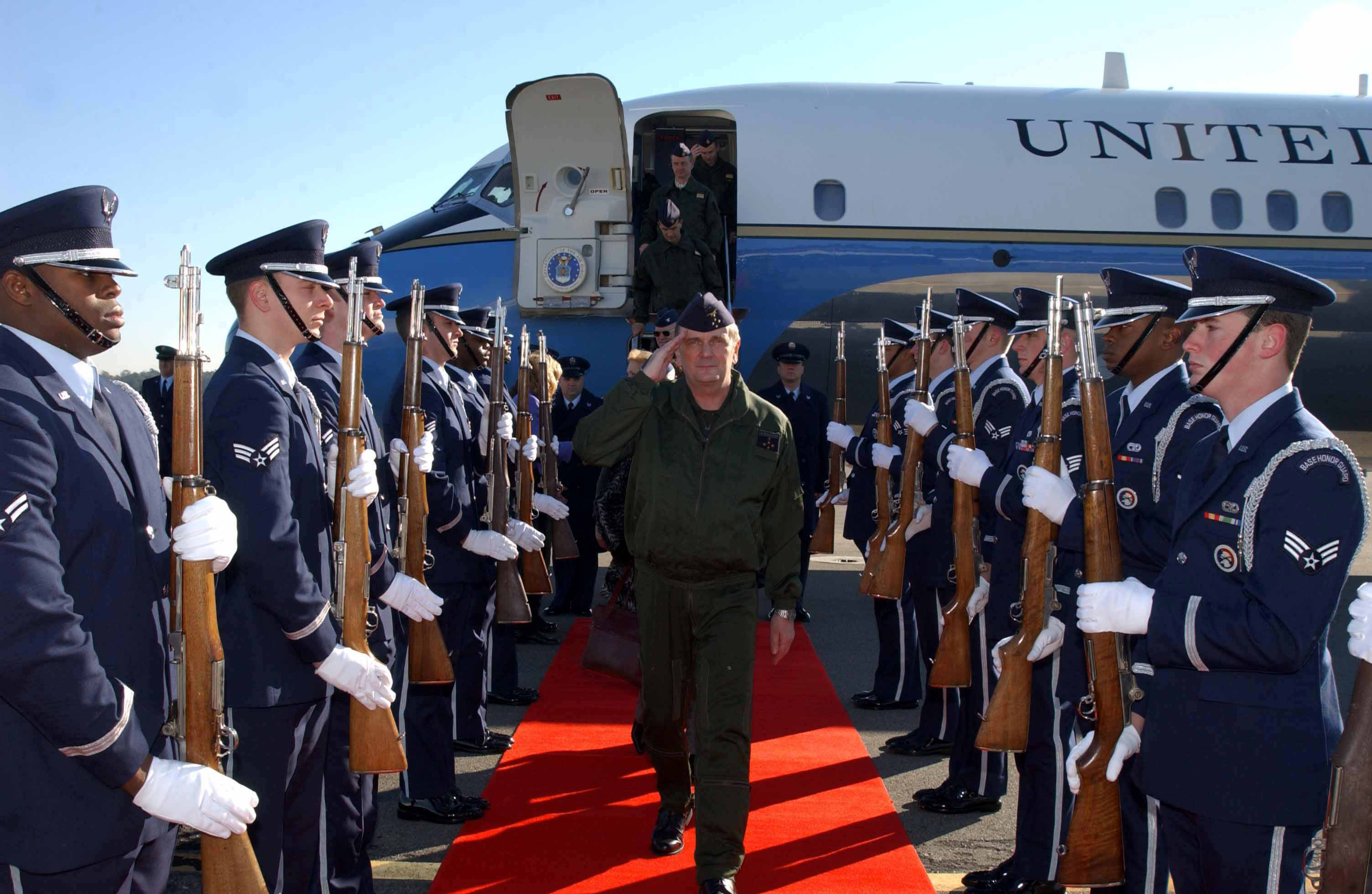
Wolsztynski at Charleston Air Force Base.

Richard Wolsztynski (born 18 April 1948 in Saint-Avold, Moselle) is a retired French general officer. He was Chief of Staff of the French Air Force from 2002 to 2006.
