= René Bouscat =

Rene Bouscat was a French Air Force general who initially served under the Vichy French Air Force during the North African campaign of World War II. He became Chief of Staff of the French Air Force on 1 July 1943, overseeing the merger between the Vichy French Air Force and the Free French Air Forces. He served as Chief of Staff until October 30, 1944, and then again from February 28, 1946, until September 6, 1946.
