= Martial Henri Valin =

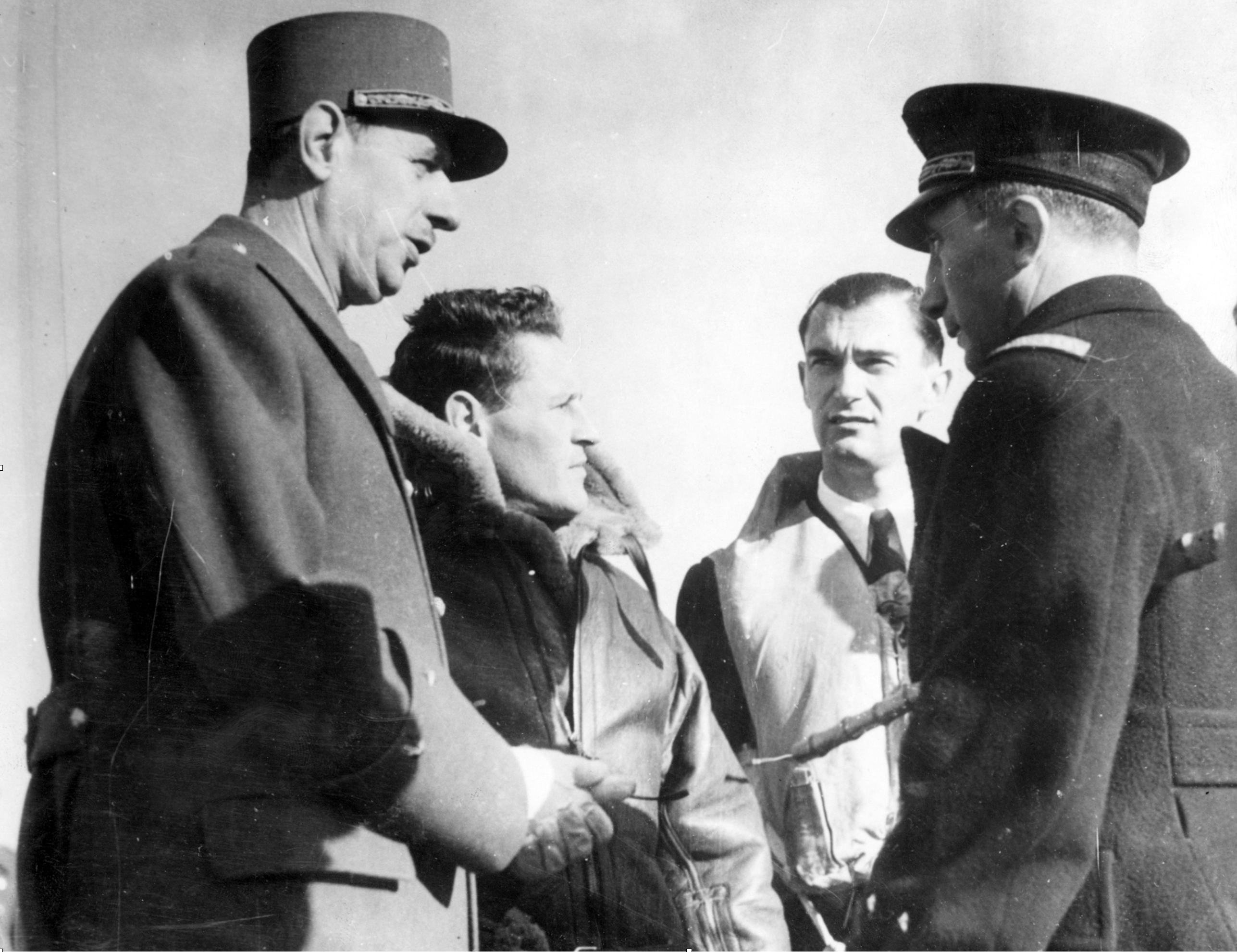
Charles De Gaulle, Philippe de Scitivaux, René Mouchotte, and Martial Valin in 1943.

Martial Henri Valin (French pronunciation: [maʁsjal ɑ̃ʁi valɛ̃]; 14 May 1898 in Limoges – 19 September 1980 in Neuilly-sur-Seine) was a French Air Force general. He initially served as a cavalryman in the First World War. After nine years cavalry service in the chasseurs d'Afrique, dragoons, spahis, and hussars, he eventually volunteered for the French Army's aviation branch, the aéronautique militaire, in 1926. He commanded the Free French Air Forces from July 1941 to June 1944, and was then Chief of General Staff of the French Air Army from October 1944 until 1946. He participated in both World Wars and the Rif War.

== Life ==
Martial Valin was born in Limoges.

During the First World War he served as a soldier in the 4th Dragoons in 1917. He was soon selected for officer training and returned to active service in 1918 as an aspirant in the 3rd Chasseurs d'Afrique. With this regiment he took part in the battle of l'Aisne, during which he suffered from gas poisoning.

In 1919 he received his commission as a sub-lieutenant and served with the 16th Dragoons, but in 1920 was sent on to the Saumur Cavalry School. He was then promoted to Lieutenant, serving with the 21st Moroccan Spahis in the French mandates in the levant and then the 22nd Moroccan Spahis in French Morocco, with whom he took part in the Rif War in 1925. His last cavalry regiment was the 4th Hussars in France.

In 1926 Martial Valin volunteered as an aviator, serving as an observer in 1927 and then a pilot from 1928, specialised in night flying and bombing.

In 1929 he became a captain, first as an escadrille commander, then as a staff officer. In the mid-1930s he became a staff officer with the air force general staff.

In 1938 he was promoted to commandant and served with the 33rd Air Squadron (at this time a French "squadron" was equivalent to an RAF "wing")

Appointed a military attache in Rio de Janeiro in 1940, he arrived in England in 1941 to assist the Free French. Vice-admiral Muselier had started to form the Free French Air Forces and Valin worked on this task under Muselier from June 1940, later being officially appointed the chief of these forces in 1941.

In August 1941, Valin was appointed to a political role on the exiled Comité national français as the "air forces commissary".

In 1944, Valin participated in the Liberation of Paris.

In 1946, the U.S. Air Force awarded Valin the Aviation Badge of Command Pilote.

Martial Valin died in 1980 in Neuilly-sur-Seine, and was buried in his town of birth, Limoges.

== Promotions and career ==
1917: private
1918: aspirant
1919: sub-lieutenant
1921: lieutenant
1926: transfers to aeronautique militaire
1929: captain
1938: commandant
June 1940 : lieutenant-colonel
April 1941 : lieutenant-colonel appointed acting colonel
August 1941 : lieutenant-colonel appointed acting air brigade general, and appointed member of the French National Committee
March 1942 : promoted to colonel acting air brigade general
October 1942 : promoted to air brigade general
March 1944 : air brigade general appointed acting air divisional general
October 1944 : promoted to air divisional general
January 1945 : air divisional general appointed acting air corps general
April 1947 : promoted to air corps general
October 1950 : promoted to air army general
May 1954 : appointed air army general without age limit ("maintenu en activité sans limite d'âge")

== Legacy ==
A boulevard in Paris was named after Valin; the French Ministry of Armed Forces is located at 60 blvd du Général Martial Valin.
