= Opinion polling for the 2016 Portuguese presidential election =

In the run up to the 2016 Portuguese presidential election, various organisations carried out opinion polling to gauge voting intention in Portugal. Results of such polls are displayed in this article.

Poll results are listed in the table below in reverse chronological order, showing the most recent first. The highest percentage figure in each polling survey is displayed in bold, and the background shaded in the leading candidate colour. In the instance that there is a tie, then no figure is shaded but both are displayed in bold. Poll results use the date the survey's fieldwork was done, as opposed to the date of publication.

== Candidates vote ==
=== First round ===
==== Graphical summary ====
View source data.

==== Polling ====
Exit poll

Polling firm	Fieldwork date	Sample size	Rebelo de Sousa	Maria de Belém	Sampaio da Nóvoa	Henrique Neto	Edgar Silva	Marisa Matias	Paulo de Morais	Cândido Ferreira	Vitorino Silva	Jorge Sequeira	Oth/ Und	Lead
Polling firm	Fieldwork date	Sample size	PSD CDS	Ind.	Ind.	Ind.	PCP	BE	Ind.	Ind.	Ind.	Ind.	Oth/ Und	Lead
**Election results**	24 Jan 2016	48.7	52.0	4.2	22.9	0.8	3.9	10.1	2.2	0.2	3.2	0.3	—N/a	**29.1**
UCP–CESOP	24 Jan 2016	31,018	49–54	3–5	22–25	0–2	3–5	9–11	1–3	0–1	2–4	0–1	—	27– 29
Eurosondagem	24 Jan 2016	43,678	50.1–54.9	3.3–4.8	21.1–24.8	0.7–1.4	3.0–4.1	8.8–11.3	1.4–2.5	0.3–0.7	2.6–3.7	0.3–0.7	—	29.0– 30.1
Intercampus	24 Jan 2016	15,481	50.9–55.7	2.9–5.9	19.3–23.3	—	1.9–4.9	8.8–12.4	—	—	—	—	5.5–8.5	31.6– 32.4
Aximage	16–20 Jan 2016	1,301	51.5	9.0	22.6	0.8	5.2	6.6	2.3	0.1	1.8	0.1	—N/a	28.9
Intercampus	14–20 Jan 2016	1,043	51.8	10.1	16.9	2.3	4.6	7.9	2.9	0.5	2.5	0.6	—N/a	34.9
Eurosondagem	14–19 Jan 2016	2,025	55.0	13.3	19.0	1.1	3.7	5.3	2.2	0.1	0.2	0.1	—N/a	36.0
UCP–CESOP	16–17 Jan 2016	3,340	52	8	22	1	3	8	3	0.5	2	0.5	—N/a	30
Consulmark2	11–14 Jan 2016	1,004	53.0	10.5	23.4	1.0	2.5	4.0	3.8	0.1	1.5	0.3	—N/a	29.6
Eurosondagem	7–13 Jan 2016	1,516	54.8	16.3	16.8	1.1	4.0	4.8	1.6	0.2	0.2	0.2	—N/a	29.6
Aximage	2–5 Jan 2016	602	52.9	11.8	16.9	1.0	2.9	2.8	2.9	—N/a	—N/a	—N/a	8.8	36.0
Eurosondagem	16–21 Dec 2015	1,515	52.5	18.1	16.9	1.3	4.7	4.8	1.7	—N/a	—N/a	—N/a	—N/a	34.4
UCP–CESOP	5–6 Dec 2015	1,183	62	14	15	1	3	3	1	—N/a	—N/a	—N/a	1	47
Aximage	28 Nov–2 Dec 2015	605	54.6	13.4	13.2	0.4	1.9	2.4	1.1	—N/a	—N/a	—N/a	13.0	41.2
Eurosondagem	13–18 Nov 2015	1,510	48.0	18.9	16.7	2.2	5.2	6.9	1.1	—N/a	—N/a	—N/a	1.0	29.1
Aximage	31 Oct–4 Nov 2015	603	56.9	13.1	15.3	—N/a	2.1	—N/a	—N/a	—N/a	—N/a	—N/a	12.9	41.6
Aximage	26 Sep–1 Oct 2015	1,387	29.7	14.7	13.0	1.1	10.3 (JS)	—N/a	—N/a	—N/a	—N/a	—N/a	31.2	8.2
Intercampus	23–30 Sep 2015	1,013	49.3	17.0	10.1	1.4	—N/a	—N/a	—N/a	—N/a	—N/a	—N/a	22.2	32.3

=== Second round ===
Hypothetical polling

Matchups with confirmed candidates

Polling firm	Fieldwork date	Sample size	Rebelo de Sousa	Sampaio da Nóvoa	Maria de Belém
Polling firm	Fieldwork date	Sample size	PSD	Ind.	Ind.
Intercampus	14–20 Jan 2016	1,043	68.4	—N/a	31.6
Intercampus	14–20 Jan 2016	1,043	67.0	33.0	—N/a
Eurosondagem	14–19 Jan 2016	2,025	65.2	—N/a	34.8
Eurosondagem	14–19 Jan 2016	2,025	64.8	35.2	—N/a
Eurosondagem	7–13 Jan 2016	1,516	63.7	—N/a	36.3
Eurosondagem	7–13 Jan 2016	1,516	63.0	37.0	—N/a
Eurosondagem	16–21 Dec 2015	1,515	62.5	—N/a	37.5
Eurosondagem	16–21 Dec 2015	1,515	62.1	37.9	—N/a
UCP–CESOP	5–6 Dec 2015	1,183	57	—N/a	17
UCP–CESOP	5–6 Dec 2015	1,183	57	17	—N/a
Aximage	4–8 Feb 2015	608	65.9	—N/a	34.1
Eurosondagem	17–21 Nov 2014	1,033	70.2	29.8	—N/a

Matchups with speculated candidates

Polling firm	Fieldwork date	Sample size	Rebelo de Sousa	Rui Rio	Santana Lopes	Durão Barroso	António Guterres	António Vitorino	Carvalho da Silva	Sampaio da Nóvoa	Maria de Belém	Jaime Gama
Polling firm	Fieldwork date	Sample size	PSD	PSD	PSD	PSD	PS	PS	Ind.	Ind.	PS	PS
Aximage	4–8 Feb 2015	608	**65.7**	—N/a	—N/a	—N/a	—N/a	—N/a	—N/a	—N/a	—N/a	34.3
Aximage	4–8 Feb 2015	608	**62.8**	—N/a	—N/a	—N/a	—N/a	37.2	—N/a	—N/a	—N/a	—N/a
Aximage	4–8 Feb 2015	608	—N/a	**59.6**	—N/a	—N/a	—N/a	—N/a	—N/a	—N/a	40.4	—N/a
Aximage	4–8 Feb 2015	608	—N/a	**67.7**	—N/a	—N/a	—N/a	—N/a	—N/a	—N/a	—N/a	32.3
Aximage	4–8 Feb 2015	608	—N/a	**54.8**	—N/a	—N/a	—N/a	45.2	—N/a	—N/a	—N/a	—N/a
Aximage	4–8 Feb 2015	608	—N/a	—N/a	24.9	—N/a	—N/a	**75.1**	—N/a	—N/a	—N/a	—N/a
Aximage	4–8 Feb 2015	608	—N/a	—N/a	35.2	—N/a	—N/a	—N/a	—N/a	—N/a	**64.8**	—N/a
Aximage	4–8 Feb 2015	608	—N/a	—N/a	34.9	—N/a	—N/a	—N/a	—N/a	—N/a	—N/a	**65.1**
Eurosondagem	8–14 Jan 2015	1,010	47.5	—N/a	—N/a	—N/a	**52.5**	—N/a	—N/a	—N/a	—N/a	—N/a
Eurosondagem	8–14 Jan 2015	1,010	—N/a	45.9	—N/a	—N/a	**54.1**	—N/a	—N/a	—N/a	—N/a	—N/a
Eurosondagem	8–14 Jan 2015	1,010	—N/a	—N/a	44.8	—N/a	**55.2**	—N/a	—N/a	—N/a	—N/a	—N/a
Eurosondagem	8–14 Jan 2015	1,010	48.0	—N/a	—N/a	—N/a	—N/a	**52.0**	—N/a	—N/a	—N/a	—N/a
Eurosondagem	8–14 Jan 2015	1,010	—N/a	46.1	—N/a	—N/a	—N/a	**53.9**	—N/a	—N/a	—N/a	—N/a
Eurosondagem	8–14 Jan 2015	1,010	—N/a	—N/a	43.4	—N/a	—N/a	**56.6**	—N/a	—N/a	—N/a	—N/a
Eurosondagem	8–14 Jan 2015	1,010	—N/a	**56.5**	—N/a	—N/a	—N/a	—N/a	—N/a	43.5	—N/a	—N/a
Eurosondagem	8–14 Jan 2015	1,010	—N/a	—N/a	**58.3**	—N/a	—N/a	—N/a	—N/a	41.7	—N/a	—N/a
Eurosondagem	17–21 Nov 2014	1,033	—N/a	—N/a	—N/a	39.7	**60.3**	—N/a	—N/a	—N/a	—N/a	—N/a
Eurosondagem	17–21 Nov 2014	1,033	47.4	—N/a	—N/a	—N/a	**52.6**	—N/a	—N/a	—N/a	—N/a	—N/a
Eurosondagem	17–21 Nov 2014	1,033	—N/a	—N/a	41.3	—N/a	**58.7**	—N/a	—N/a	—N/a	—N/a	—N/a
Eurosondagem	17–21 Nov 2014	1,033	—N/a	44.2	—N/a	—N/a	**55.8**	—N/a	—N/a	—N/a	—N/a	—N/a
Eurosondagem	17–21 Nov 2014	1,033	—N/a	—N/a	—N/a	40.7	—N/a	**59.3**	—N/a	—N/a	—N/a	—N/a
Eurosondagem	17–21 Nov 2014	1,033	48.2	—N/a	—N/a	—N/a	—N/a	**51.8**	—N/a	—N/a	—N/a	—N/a
Eurosondagem	17–21 Nov 2014	1,033	—N/a	—N/a	44.5	—N/a	—N/a	**55.5**	—N/a	—N/a	—N/a	—N/a
Eurosondagem	17–21 Nov 2014	1,033	—N/a	47.5	—N/a	—N/a	—N/a	**52.5**	—N/a	—N/a	—N/a	—N/a
Eurosondagem	17–21 Nov 2014	1,033	—N/a	—N/a	—N/a	**55.2**	—N/a	—N/a	44.8	—N/a	—N/a	—N/a
Eurosondagem	17–21 Nov 2014	1,033	**64.9**	—N/a	—N/a	—N/a	—N/a	—N/a	35.1	—N/a	—N/a	—N/a
Eurosondagem	17–21 Nov 2014	1,033	—N/a	—N/a	**58.0**	—N/a	—N/a	—N/a	42.0	—N/a	—N/a	—N/a
Eurosondagem	17–21 Nov 2014	1,033	—N/a	**64.8**	—N/a	—N/a	—N/a	—N/a	35.2	—N/a	—N/a	—N/a
Eurosondagem	17–21 Nov 2014	1,033	—N/a	—N/a	—N/a	**69.5**	—N/a	—N/a	—N/a	30.5	—N/a	—N/a
Eurosondagem	17–21 Nov 2014	1,033	—N/a	—N/a	**65.1**	—N/a	—N/a	—N/a	—N/a	34.9	—N/a	—N/a
Eurosondagem	17–21 Nov 2014	1,033	—N/a	**70.6**	—N/a	—N/a	—N/a	—N/a	—N/a	29.4	—N/a	—N/a

== Leadership polls ==
=== Preferred candidate ===
Poll results showing public opinion on who would be the best candidate for each political side, are shown in the table below in reverse chronological order, showing the most recent first.

==== Centre-Right/Right ====
Polling firm	Fieldwork date	Sample size	Rebelo de Sousa	Rui Rio	Santana Lopes	Durão Barroso	Paulo Portas	Marques Mendes	Assunção Esteves	Leonor Beleza	Ferreira Leite	Paulo de Morais	Oth/ Und	Lead
Polling firm	Fieldwork date	Sample size	PSD	PSD	PSD	PSD	CDS	PSD	PSD	PSD	PSD	Ind.	Oth/ Und	Lead
Aximage	12–16 Jul 2015	607	**46.2**	36.7	—N/a	6.5	—N/a	—N/a	—N/a	—N/a	—N/a	—N/a	10.6	9.5
Eurosondagem	2–7 Jul 2015	1,025	**29.6**	24.8	16.9	—N/a	—N/a	—N/a	—N/a	—N/a	—N/a	2.0	26.7	4.8
Aximage	3–6 Mar 2015	600	**49.8**	35.7	5.6	—N/a	—N/a	—N/a	—N/a	—N/a	7.0	—N/a	1.9	14.1
Aximage	3–6 Mar 2015	600	39.7	**40.2**	4.8	—N/a	—N/a	—N/a	—N/a	—N/a	8.6	—N/a	6.7	0.5
Aximage	6–9 Dec 2013	609	**44.2**	32.3	4.2	8.2	—N/a	—N/a	—N/a	4.3	—N/a	—N/a	6.8	11.9
Eurosondagem	30 Oct–5 Nov 2013	1,005	**29.3**	26.4	13.3	6.9	4.8	2.5	2.1	—N/a	—N/a	—N/a	14.7	2.9
Aximage	5–7 Mar 2012	600	**40.0**	—N/a	9.3	22.9	—N/a	—N/a	—N/a	8.3	—N/a	—N/a	19.5	17.1

==== Centre-Left/Left ====
Polling firm	Fieldwork date	Sample size	António Costa	António Guterres	José Sócrates	António Vitorino	Carvalho da Silva	Ferro Rodrigues	Sampaio da Nóvoa	Maria de Belém	António José Seguro	Oliveira Martins	Henrique Neto	Oth/ Und	Lead
Polling firm	Fieldwork date	Sample size	PS	PS	PS	PS	Ind.	PS	Ind.	PS	PS	Ind.	PS	Oth/ Und	Lead
Aximage	12–16 Jul 2015	607	—N/a	—N/a	—N/a	—N/a	—N/a	—N/a	25.9	**32.4**	—N/a	18.1	—N/a	23.7	6.5
Eurosondagem	2–7 Jul 2015	1,025	—N/a	—N/a	—N/a	—N/a	—N/a	—N/a	**33.3**	25.0	—N/a	—N/a	4.8	36.9	8.3
Aximage	3–6 Mar 2015	600	—N/a	—N/a	—N/a	**39.5**	20.0	—N/a	—N/a	25.7	8.8	—N/a	—N/a	6.0	13.8
Aximage	3–6 Mar 2015	600	—N/a	—N/a	—N/a	**42.4**	10.7	—N/a	—N/a	21.1	13.4	—N/a	—N/a	12.4	21.3
Aximage	6–9 Dec 2013	609	**43.8**	27.3	—N/a	—N/a	6.3	—N/a	3.1	10.4	—N/a	—N/a	—N/a	9.1	16.5
Eurosondagem	30 Oct–5 Nov 2013	1,005	**26.6**	20.9	13.7	10.0	6.5	3.3	2.2	—N/a	—N/a	—N/a	—N/a	16.8	5.7
Aximage	5–7 Mar 2012	600	**33.1**	25.4	—N/a	—N/a	10.3	—N/a	—N/a	15.0	—N/a	—N/a	—N/a	16.2	7.7
