= Marisa Matias =

Portuguese politician (born 1976)

Marisa Matias MEP
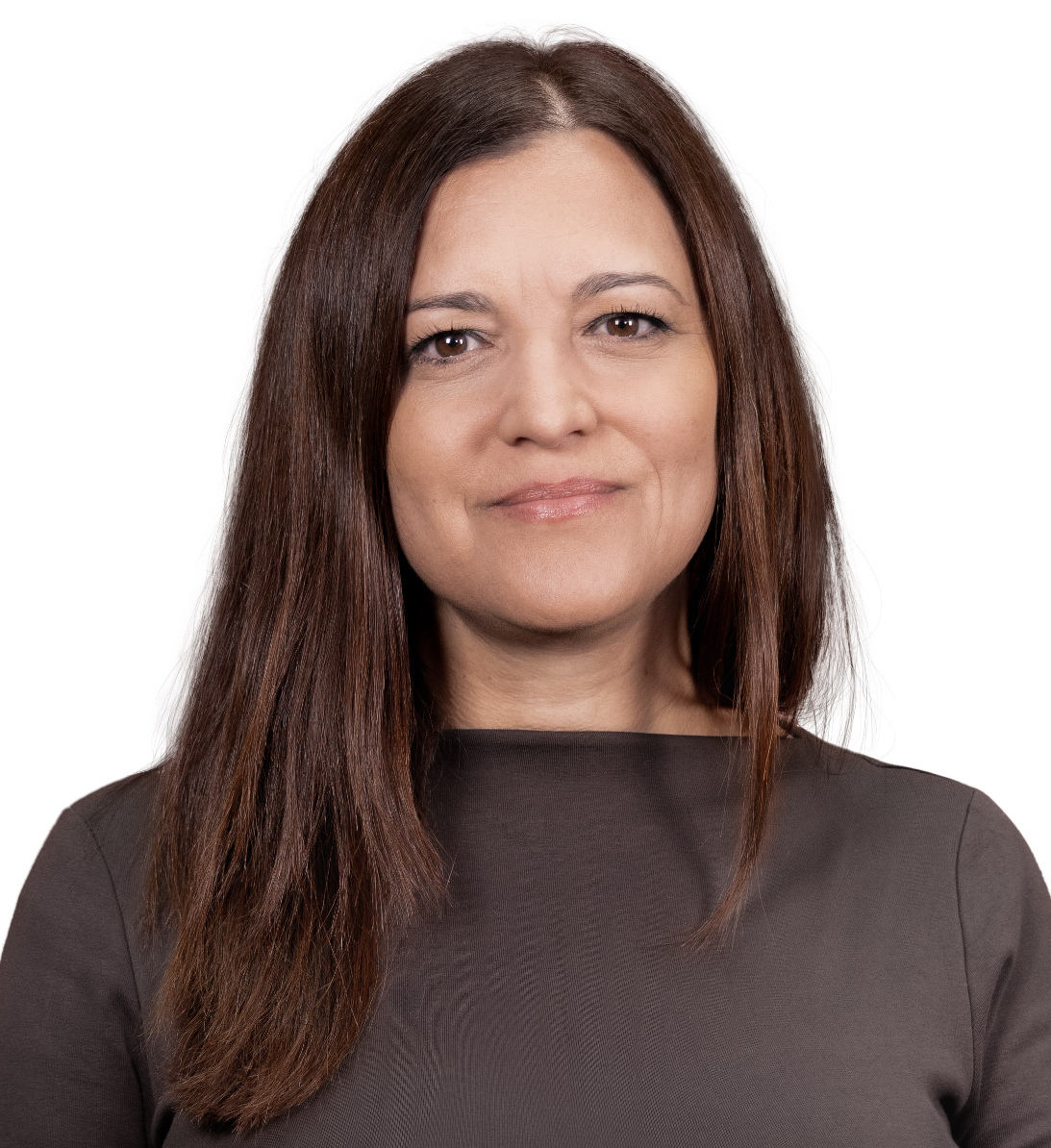
- Marisa Matias in 2024

Member of the Assembly of the Republic
- In office 26 March 2024 – 18 May 2025
- Constituency: Porto

Member of the European Parliament for Portugal
- In office 14 July 2009 – 25 March 2024
- Succeeded by: Anabela Rodrigues

Personal details
- Born: Marisa Isabel dos Santos Matias; 20 February 1976 (age 50) Coimbra, Portugal
- Party: Left Bloc (2004–present)
- Other political affiliations: Politics XXI (formerly)
- Education: University of Coimbra
- Occupation: Sociologist • Politician
- Website: EU Personal Profile

Marisa Isabel dos Santos Matias (born 20 February 1976) is a Portuguese sociologist and politician. She was a member of the Assembly of the Republic from 2024 to 2025. She was also a Member of the European Parliament, between 2009 and 2024. She currently seated on the Economic and Monetary Affairs (ECON) and Industry, Research and Energy (ITRE) Committees. She was also Chairwoman of the Delegation of the European Parliament for relations with the Mashreq countries (Egypt, Jordan, Lebanon and Syria). Between 2010 and 2016 she was Vice-President of the Party of the European Left.

In November 2015, Matias announced her candidacy for the 2016 Portuguese presidential elections, representing the Left Bloc party. She finished 3rd, with 10,12% of the votes, the best result ever achieved by a woman in a presidential election in Portugal at the time. She was also a candidate for Left Bloc in the 2021 Portuguese presidential election in which she came 5th, with 3.95% of the vote.

== Biography ==
Marisa Matias studied Sociology at the University of Coimbra, where she completed her doctoral thesis: “Is nature sick of us? Health, environment and emerging forms of citizenship” (2009). Her areas of specialisation include environmental health, sociology of science, political sociology, democracy and participation. She has published several scientific articles, chapters in books and other publications, on the relations between environment and public health, science and knowledge, democracy and citizenship.

=== Civic and political activity ===
Matias is a member of the Left Bloc National Board and Executive Board; as well as a member of the board of Pro-Urbe, a civic association in Coimbra. She was a national trustee of the movement "Cidadania e Responsabilidade pelo Sim", during the campaign for decriminalization of abortion in Portugal. She was also an activist in the movement against co-incineration in Souselas (pt) and head of the Left Bloc list in the elections for Coimbra Municipality (2005).

=== Member of the European Parliament ===
==== 2009 – 2014 ====
In 2009, Matias was elected as a Member of the European Parliament (MEP) for the Left Bloc, which sits as part of the political group GUE/NGL in the European Parliament. She was made a member of the Industry, Research and Energy Committee and the Environment, Public Health and Food Safety Committee and a member of the delegations for relations with the Mashriq Countries, with Palestine, and with South Africa.

At the beginning of her mandate, Matias was nominated the Parliament's rapporteur to write and negotiate the directive preventing the distribution of counterfeit medicines, a business that generates more than €400 billion per year for the counterfeiting networks and puts at risk the life of patients. The directive, negotiated for almost two years with the parliamentary groups and the governments, was approved in 2011. This was only the second time since Portugal's entrance into the EU that a Portuguese MEP had led the process of a framework-directive - a law that will be transposed to the judicial system of each of the EU Member States.

At the same time, she was also rapporteur of the European strategy in the fight against Alzheimer and other dementias, that was also approved in 2011. She was co-president of the European Work Group for Diabetes, being co-author of the first resolution to ever be approved in the European Parliament aiming at the definition of a political strategy to fight the diabetes epidemic (2010). In addition, she was involved in the planning and approval of resolutions on cancer and HIV, and was an active member of the parliamentary committee of inquiry on the H1N1 vaccine. In 2011, Matias was chosen by her peers, with more than 350 votes, as MEP of the Year for health - the only MEP from the United Left Parliamentary Group to receive this honour since its creation.

Throughout 2011 and 2012, Matias was the Parliament's rapporteur for the definition of a Common Strategic Framework for Research and Innovation. The report was approved in 2012 and established the bases for what should be the proposal for the Horizon 2020 programme on the European financing of research and innovation for the period 2014–2020. Besides the proposal to reinforce the funds and of a better geographical distribution of the funds, the approved proposal also included a significant increase of support to the scientific work and to the attribution of scholarships within the European financing framework. Later, would also be part of the team of six rapporteurs, nominated by the European Parliament, to the definition and negotiation of the proposal about the Horizon 2020, being responsible for one of the legislative regulations on the Strategic Agenda for Innovation. The legislative package would end up being approved at the end of 2013, being already active since January 2014.

In 2012, she was still nominated rapporteur of the European Parliament for the evaluation of the European Central Bank's (ECB) activities of 2011. In a very disputed process and hard negotiations, her report was narrowly approved by one vote (23 votes in favour, 22 against) in the Economic and Monetary Affairs Committee. The report was finally approved in April 2013, but Marisa Matias requested her name to be withdrawn as a result of last-minute amendments which removed all critical references to the ECB's role in the European Troika, and demands to return profits made by the ECB under the ECB's market securities programme.

Marisa Matias was, still, the Parliament's rapporteur for four opinion on European strategy for adapting to climate change, resettling of GDP calculation, proposal for a new pluri-annual financing framework and regulation defining indexes on the goods traded in stock market.

As shadow rapporteur, meaning, MEP responsible within its parliamentary group, to follow and negotiate proposals led by other colleagues from other parliamentary groups, Marisa Matias followed, during the mandate, the making of 25 parliamentary proposals, having presented proposals for change and being present in negotiation meetings. So far, was also co-author of 119 proposals of parliamentary resolutions.

While Vice-President of the Parliament to the relations with the Mashreq countries (Lebanon, Syria, Jordan and Egypt) was part and presided to several parliamentary negotiations with these countries, coordinating processes of negotiation with the correspondent national parliaments. This was also done during the period known for the transformations introduced by the Arab Spring. Marisa is also member of the Parliament's Delegation to the relations with the Palestinian Legislative Council, having developed initiatives mainly concerning the siege of the Gaza Strip.

=== Presidential candidacy ===
On 18 October 2015, Catarina Martins, coordinator of the Left Bloc, announced that, as no credible unifying leftist candidate had thus far come forward for the Presidential elections of January 2016, Marisa Matias allowed her name to be put forward as representing her party in those elections. She finished 3rd, with 10,12% of the votes, the best result ever achieved by a woman in a presidential election in Portugal. On 9 September 2021, Marisa Matias announced she would run for president again on the 2021 Portuguese presidential election.

== Electoral history ==
=== European Parliament election, 2014 ===
Ballot: 25 May 2014
Party	Candidate	Votes	%	Seats	+/−
PS	Francisco Assis	1,034,249	31.5	8	+1
PSD/CDS–PP	Paulo Rangel	910,647	27.7	7	–3
CDU	João Ferreira	416,925	12.7	3	+1
MPT	Marinho e Pinto	234,788	7.2	2	+2
BE	Marisa Matias	149,764	4.6	1	–2
Livre	Rui Tavares	71,495	2.2	0	new
PAN	Orlando Figueiredo	56,431	1.7	0	new
PCTP/MRPP	Leopoldo Mesquita	54,708	1.7	0	±0
Other parties		111,765	3.4	0	±0
Blank/Invalid ballots		243,681	7.4	–	–
Turnout		3,284,452	33.67	21	–1
Source: Comissão Nacional de Eleições

=== Presidential election, 2016 ===
Ballot: 24 January 2016
Candidate	Votes	%
Marcelo Rebelo de Sousa	2,413,956	52.0
Sampaio da Nóvoa	1,062,138	22.9
Marisa Matias	469,814	10.1
Maria de Belém	196,765	4.2
Edgar Silva	183,051	3.9
Vitorino Silva	152,374	3.3
Paulo de Morais	100,191	2.2
Henrique Neto	39,163	0.8
Jorge Sequeira	13,954	0.3
Cândido Ferreira	10,609	0.2
Blank/Invalid ballots	102,552	–
Turnout	4,744,567	48.66
Source: Comissão Nacional de Eleições

=== European Parliament election, 2019 ===
Ballot: 26 May 2019
Party	Candidate	Votes	%	Seats	+/−
PS	Pedro Marques	1,104,694	33.4	9	+1
PSD	Paulo Rangel	725,399	21.9	6	±0
BE	Marisa Matias	325,093	9.8	2	+1
CDU	João Ferreira	228,045	6.9	2	–1
CDS–PP	Nuno Melo	204,792	6.2	1	±0
PAN	Francisco Guerreiro	168,015	5.1	1	+1
Alliance	Paulo Sande	61,652	1.9	0	new
Livre	Rui Tavares	60,446	1.8	0	±0
Basta!	André Ventura	49,388	1.5	0	new
NC	Paulo de Morais	34,634	1.1	0	new
Other parties		116,743	2.7	0	±0
Blank/Invalid ballots		235,748	3.5	–	–
Turnout		3,307,644	30.75	21	±0
Source: Comissão Nacional de Eleições

=== Presidential election, 2021 ===
Ballot: 24 January 2021
Candidate	Votes	%
Marcelo Rebelo de Sousa	2,531,692	60.7
Ana Gomes	540,823	13.0
André Ventura	497,746	11.9
João Ferreira	179,764	4.3
Marisa Matias	165,127	4.0
Tiago Mayan Gonçalves	134,991	3.2
Vitorino Silva	123,031	3.0
Blank/Invalid ballots	85,182	–
Turnout	4,258,356	39.26
Source: Comissão Nacional de Eleições
