= Vitorino Silva =

Portuguese paver, television personality and politician

President of React, Include, Recycle
- In office 30 May 2019 – 21 May 2022
- Preceded by: Party established
- Succeeded by: Márcia Henriques

President of the Parish Council of Rans
- In office 1994–2002

Personal details
- Born: Vitorino Francisco da Rocha e Silva; 19 April 1971 (age 55) Rans, Penafiel, Portugal
- Party: React, Include, Recycle (R.I.R.)
- Other political affiliations: Socialist Party (until 2009)
- Occupation: Paver

Vitorino Francisco da Rocha e Silva (born 19 April 1971), popularly known as Tino de Rans, is a Portuguese paver, television personality and politician.

== Biography ==
Vitorino Silva was born in the small village of Rans in Penafiel; the sixth of eight siblings born to a ropemaker father and a smallholder and poultry farmer mother. His father died when he was eight years old.

He became President of the Parish Council of Rans in the 1993 local elections, where he was running for the Socialist Party; he was reelected in the 1997 elections and served until 2002. He became famous nationwide in February 1999, when he delivered an enthusiastic speech during the 11th National Congress of the Socialist Party that drew applause and laughter from the audience at the Coliseu dos Recreios; the speech ended with Silva hugging the party's secretary-general and incumbent Prime Minister António Guterres.

He enjoyed some fame as a media personality; in 2001 he released a music album (Tinomania, which included the popular hit "Pão Pão, Fiambre Fiambre"), and participated in SIC entertainment show Noites Marcianas and, in 2005, was a contestant in TVI reality show Quinta das Celebridades. Later still, in 2013, Silva was a contestant in the TVI celebrity reality show Big Brother VIP. In 2011, Silva, playing a fictionalised version of himself, participated in the acclaimed comedy show Último a Sair, spoofing Big Brother-like reality television shows.

Silva left the Socialist Party and unsuccessfully ran as an independent for Mayor of Valongo in the 2009 local elections, and for Mayor of Penafiel in the 2017 local elections.

In 2019, he founded React, Include, Recycle (R.I.R.), a political party presenting itself as outside the conventional left–right political spectrum. The party was on the ballot for the first time in that year's legislative election, but failed to secure any seats in the Assembly of the Republic, with only 0.67% of the vote.

Silva was a candidate for President of the Republic in the 2016 presidential election and polled 6th place with 3.28% of the vote, a surprisingly good result for a candidate with no direct or indirect party support (very close to the results of Edgar Silva, the candidate supported by the Portuguese Communist Party, and of Maria de Belém Roseira, former President of the Socialist Party and twice government minister).

Vitorino Silva was a candidate for President of the Republic in the 2021 Portuguese presidential election. For the first time Vitorino was able to debate live on national television with the other candidates and was invited to debate in the final debate with every candidate. Silva gained notoriety for confronting the far-right candidate and Chega leader, André Ventura. The candidate offered André Ventura pebbles of all colours, claiming that “the sea brings pebbles of all colours, like the sea, Portugal has people of all colours” and if he was elected he would “be the president of the entire population”, unlike his rival.

== Electoral history ==
=== Rans Parish Assembly election, 1993 ===
Ballot: 12 December 1993
Party	Candidate	Votes	%	Seats	+/−
PS	Vitorino Silva	575	62.6	6	+1
PSD	José da Cunha	285	31.0	3	–1
CDS–PP	–	47	5.1	0	±0
CDU	–	6	0.7	0	±0
Blank/Invalid ballots		6	0.7	–	–
Turnout		919	84.00	9	±0
Source: Autárquicas 1993

=== Rans Parish Assembly election, 1997 ===
Ballot: 14 December 1997
Party	Candidate	Votes	%	Seats	+/−
PS	Vitorino Silva	799	71.7	7	+1
PSD	José Moreira	204	18.3	2	–1
CDS–PP	–	92	8.3	0	±0
CDU	–	3	0.3	0	±0
Blank/Invalid ballots		17	1.5	–	–
Turnout		1,115	84.66	9	±0
Source: Autárquicas 1997

=== Valongo City Council election, 2009 ===
Ballot: 11 October 2009
Party	Candidate	Votes	%	Seats	+/−
PSD/CDS–PP	Fernando Pereira de Melo	16,068	34.3	4	–1
PS	José de Magalhães Lobão	12,751	27.2	3	–1
Ind.	Maria José Azevedo	10,754	22.9	2	new
Ind.	Vitorino Silva	2,328	5.0	0	new
CDU	José Caetano	2,173	4.6	0	±0
BE	Eliseu Lopes	1,279	2.7	0	±0
Blank/Invalid ballots		1,539	3.3	–	–
Turnout		46,892	60.99	9	±0
Source: Autárquicas 2009

=== Presidential election, 2016 ===
Ballot: 24 January 2016
Candidate	Votes	%
Marcelo Rebelo de Sousa	2,413,956	52.0
Sampaio da Nóvoa	1,062,138	22.9
Marisa Matias	469,814	10.1
Maria de Belém	196,765	4.2
Edgar Silva	183,051	3.9
Vitorino Silva	152,374	3.3
Paulo de Morais	100,191	2.2
Henrique Neto	39,163	0.8
Jorge Sequeira	13,954	0.3
Cândido Ferreira	10,609	0.2
Blank/Invalid ballots	102,552	–
Turnout	4,744,567	48.66
Source: Comissão Nacional de Eleições

=== Penafiel City Council election, 2017 ===
Ballot: 1 October 2017
Party	Candidate	Votes	%	Seats	+/−
PSD/CDS–PP	Antonino de Sousa	23,420	51.9	5	±0
PS	André Correia Ferreira	15,731	34.8	4	±0
Ind.	Vitorino Silva	2,808	6.2	0	new
Ind.	Mário Magalhães Ferreira	830	1.8	0	new
CDU	Bruno de Sousa	687	1.5	0	±0
BE	Eva Coelho	504	1.1	0	±0
Blank/Invalid ballots		1,175	2.6	–	–
Turnout		45,155	72.56	9	±0
Source: Autárquicas 2017

=== Legislative election, 2019 ===
Ballot: 6 October 2019
Party	Candidate	Votes	%	Seats	+/−
PS	António Costa	1,903,687	36.3	108	+22
PSD	Rui Rio	1,454,283	27.8	79	–10
BE	Catarina Martins	498,549	9.5	19	±0
CDU	Jerónimo de Sousa	332,018	6.3	12	–5
CDS–PP	Assunção Cristas	221,094	4.2	5	–13
PAN	André Silva	173,931	3.3	4	+3
Chega	André Ventura	67,502	1.3	1	new
IL	Carlos Guimarães Pinto	67,443	1.3	1	new
Livre	Collective leadership	56,940	1.1	1	+1
Alliance	Pedro Santana Lopes	40,175	0.8	0	new
PCTP/MRPP	None	36,006	0.7	0	±0
RIR	Vitorino Silva	35,169	0.7	0	new
Other parties		95,812	1.8	0	±0
Blank/Invalid ballots		254,875	4.9	–	–
Turnout		5,237,484	48.60	230	±0
Source: Comissão Nacional de Eleições

=== Presidential election, 2021 ===
Ballot: 24 January 2021
Candidate	Votes	%
Marcelo Rebelo de Sousa	2,531,692	60.7
Ana Gomes	540,823	13.0
André Ventura	497,746	11.9
João Ferreira	179,764	4.3
Marisa Matias	165,127	4.0
Tiago Mayan Gonçalves	134,991	3.2
Vitorino Silva	123,031	3.0
Blank/Invalid ballots	85,182	–
Turnout	4,258,356	39.26
Source: Comissão Nacional de Eleições

=== Legislative election, 2022 ===
Ballot: 30 January 2022
Party	Candidate	Votes	%	Seats	+/−
PS	António Costa	2,302,601	41.4	120	+12
PSD	Rui Rio	1,618,381	29.1	77	–2
Chega	André Ventura	399,659	7.2	12	+11
IL	João Cotrim Figueiredo	273,687	4.9	8	+7
BE	Catarina Martins	244,603	4.4	5	–14
CDU	Jerónimo de Sousa	238,920	4.3	6	–6
CDS–PP	Rodrigues dos Santos	89,181	1.6	0	–5
PAN	Inês Sousa Real	88,152	1.6	1	–3
Livre	Rui Tavares	71,232	1.3	1	±0
RIR	Vitorino Silva	23,233	0.4	0	±0
Other parties		68,996	1.2	0	±0
Blank/Invalid ballots		146,824	2.6	–	–
Turnout		5,564,539	51.46	230	±0
Source: Comissão Nacional de Eleições
