= Marcelo Rebelo de Sousa =

President of Portugal from 2016 to 2026

His Excellency Marcelo Rebelo de Sousa GColTE GColL GCIH ComSE
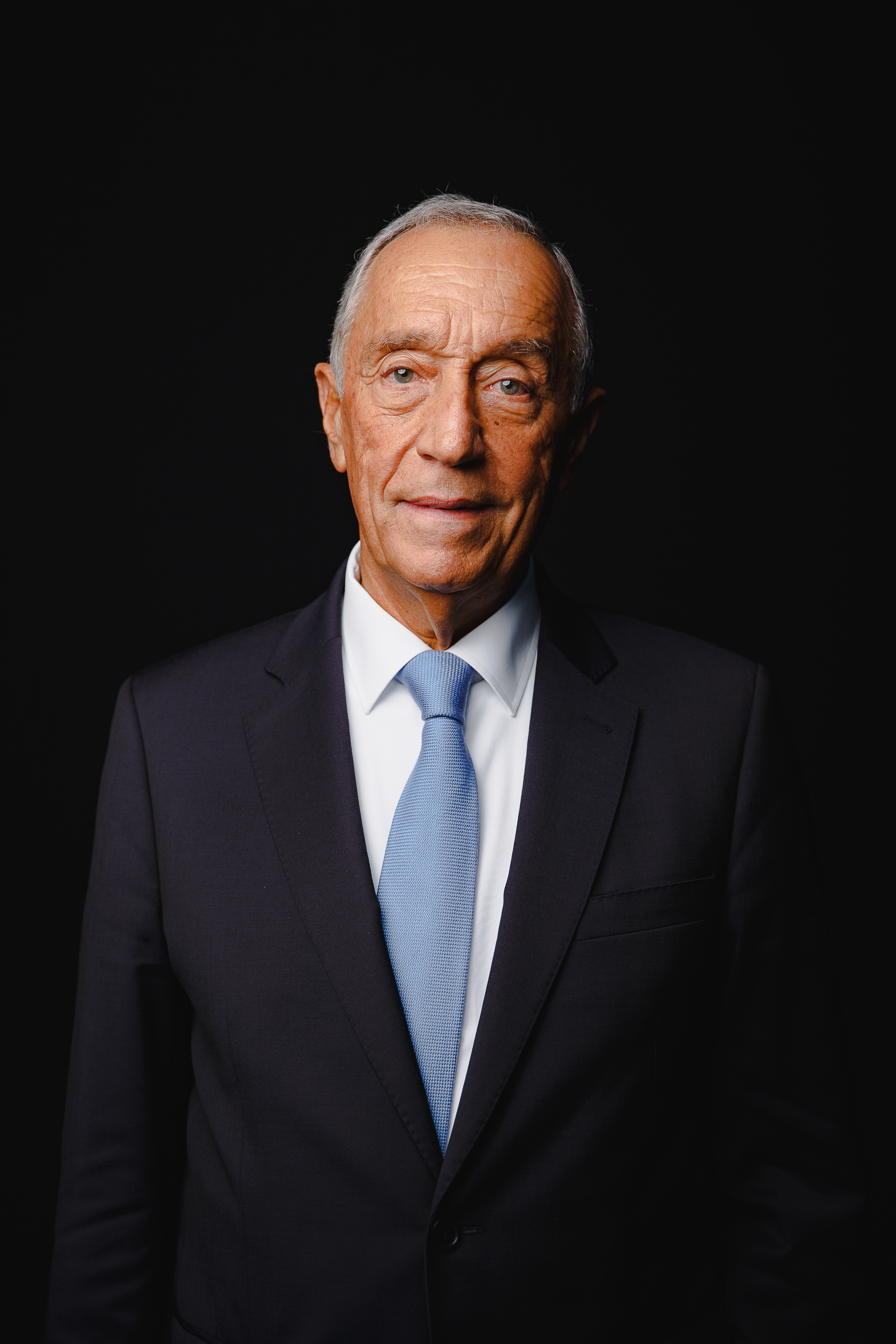
- Portrait, 2017

President of Portugal
- In office 9 March 2016 – 9 March 2026
- Prime Minister: António Costa; Luís Montenegro
- Preceded by: Aníbal Cavaco Silva
- Succeeded by: António José Seguro

President of the Social Democratic Party
- In office 31 March 1996 – 1 May 1999
- Secretary-General: Rui Rio; Carlos Horta e Costa; António Capucho; Artur Torres Pereira
- Preceded by: Fernando Nogueira
- Succeeded by: José Manuel Barroso

Leader of the Opposition
- In office 31 March 1996 – 1 May 1999
- Prime Minister: António Guterres
- Preceded by: Fernando Nogueira
- Succeeded by: José Manuel Barroso

Minister of Parliamentary Affairs
- In office 12 June 1982 – 9 June 1983
- Prime Minister: Francisco Pinto Balsemão
- Preceded by: Fernando Amaral
- Succeeded by: António de Almeida Santos

Secretary of State for the Presidency of the Council of Ministers
- In office 4 September 1981 – 10 June 1982
- Prime Minister: Francisco Pinto Balsemão
- Preceded by: José Luís da Cruz Vilaça
- Succeeded by: Leonor Beleza

Member of the Assembly of the Republic
- In office 2 June 1975 – 2 April 1976
- Constituency: Lisbon

Personal details
- Born: Marcelo Nuno Duarte Rebelo de Sousa; 12 December 1948 (age 77) Lisbon, Portugal
- Party: Social Democratic Party (1975–2015); Independent (since 2015)
- Spouse: Ana Cristina da Mota Veiga (m. 1972; div. 1983)
- Domestic partner: Rita Amaral (1981–present)
- Children: 2
- Relatives: Baltazar Rebelo de Sousa (father)

Marcelo Nuno Duarte Rebelo de Sousa (Note: European Portuguese: [mɐɾˈsɛlu ʁɨˈβelu ðɨ ˈsozɐ]) GColTE GCIH ComSE (born 12 December 1948) is a Portuguese politician and academic who served as the president of Portugal from 2016 to 2026. He is a member of the Social Democratic Party, though he suspended his party membership for the duration of his presidency. Rebelo de Sousa has previously served as a government minister, parliamentarian in the Assembly of the Republic, legal scholar, journalist, political analyst, law professor, and pundit.

== Early life ==
Born in Lisbon, Marcelo Rebelo de Sousa is the eldest son of Baltazar Rebelo de Sousa (1921–2001) and his wife Maria das Neves Fernandes Duarte (1921–2003). He has claimed that his mother had Jewish ancestry. He is named after Marcelo Caetano, the last prime minister of the Estado Novo regime and a friend of his father.

Marcelo Rebelo de Sousa became a professor and publicist specialized in constitutional law and administrative law, earning his doctorate at the University of Lisbon, where he taught law.

== Party politics and academic career ==
Marcelo Rebelo de Sousa started his career during the Estado Novo as a lawyer, and later as a journalist. He joined the Popular Democratic Party, becoming a deputy to the Assembly of the Republic. During that time, he helped draft Portugal's constitution in 1976. Later he rose to Minister of Parliamentary Affairs under Prime Minister Francisco Pinto Balsemão. Together with him he was a co-founder, director and administrator of the Expresso newspaper, owned by Pinto Balsemão. He was also a founder of Sedes. He worked with another newspaper, Semanário, between 1983 and 1987. He started as a political analyst and pundit on the radio broadcaster TSF with his Exams, in which he gave marks (0 to 20) to the main political players.

In 1989 he ran for President of the Municipal Chamber of Lisbon (Mayor of Lisbon) but lost to Jorge Sampaio, though he did win a seat as City Councilor (Vereador). In that campaign he took a plunge into the waters of the Tagus River to prove they were not polluted despite claims to the contrary. In other local elections, he also became the president of the Municipal Assembly of Cascais (1979–1982) and the president of the Municipal Assembly of Celorico de Basto (1997–2009).

=== Leader of the PSD, 1996–1999 ===
Rebelo de Sousa was the leader of the Social Democratic Party from 31 de March 1996 to 1 May 1999. He created a center-right coalition, the Democratic Alliance, with the People's Party in 1998. He became, however, the vice-president of the European People's Party–European Democrats. The coalition did not please large parts of its own party, due to the role the People's Party leader, Paulo Portas, had in undermining Aníbal Cavaco Silva's government while director of the weekly O Independente.

=== Post-leadership ===
He had a weekly program of political analysis every Sunday on public TV station RTP after previously having a similar program on the private TV station TVI. President Jorge Sampaio dissolved the Assembly of the Republic, a move that also meant dismissing the Government at a time when it had a stable coalition majority, and calling for anticipated elections, which led to the defeat of Santana Lopes and the election of the Socialists under José Sócrates.

In 2010, he left RTP and returned to TVI to do the same program that he had before.

He was made a member of the Council of State, by President Aníbal Cavaco Silva, and was sworn in on 6 April 2006.

He was a leading figure on the anti-abortion side of the 2007 abortion referendum. He even founded a website titled "Assim Não" (Not like this), which was divulged with a famous introductory video. It became so well known that it was parodied in Saturday Night Live-fashion by famous humour group Gato Fedorento.

== Presidency ==
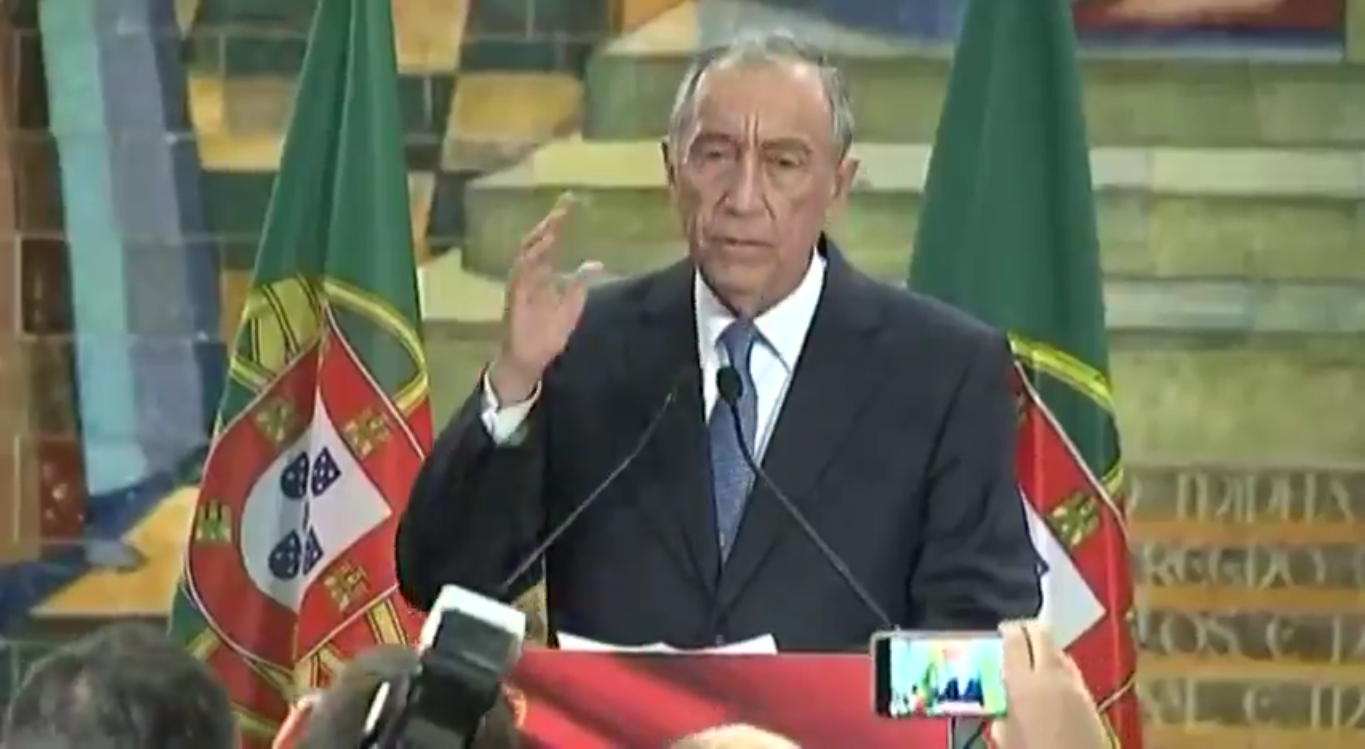
President-elect Marcelo Rebelo de Sousa delivering his victory speech on election night, 24 January 2016

On 24 January 2016, Marcelo Rebelo de Sousa was elected as President of Portugal in the first round of voting. He stood as an independent, appealing for moderation and cross-party consensus. During his election campaign, he promised to repair political divisions and the hardship of Portugal's 2011–14 bailout. Unlike his predecessor, Aníbal Cavaco Silva, he had never previously held a top state position.

In March 2020, Marcelo Rebelo de Sousa asked parliament to authorize a state of emergency to contain the COVID-19 pandemic; this marked the first time the country declared a state of emergency nationwide in 46 years of democratic history.

In December 2020, Marcelo Rebelo de Sousa announced his intention to run for office again in the 2021 Portuguese presidential election. Marcelo was re-elected president in January 2021, with 60.7% of the votes, the third highest vote margin ever in presidential elections in Portugal since the Carnation Revolution. He was also the first candidate ever to win the vote in all municipalities, ranging from 51.3% in the Beja District to 72.16% in Madeira.

During his presidency, Rebelo de Sousa has publicly supported making restitution and acknowledging abuses made during Portugal's colonialist history and the country's role in the Atlantic slave trade.

=== State visits ===
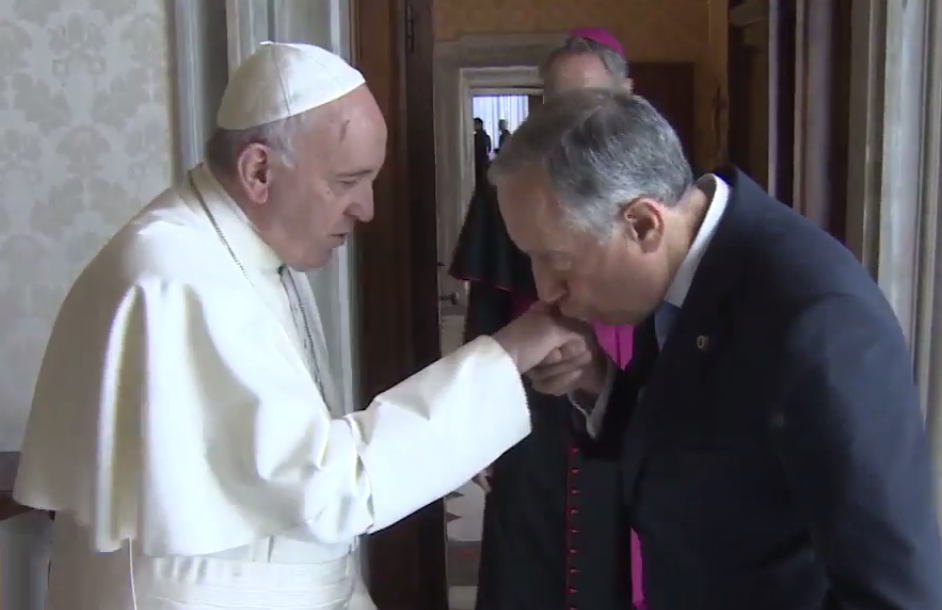
First state visit as President of Portugal (Vatican, March 2016)

Marcelo Rebelo de Sousa made his first visit as President of Portugal to the Vatican City to meet Pope Francis and the Cardinal Secretary of State Pietro Parolin on 17 March 2016, followed the same day by a trip to Portugal's neighbour Spain to meet King Felipe VI. In 2019, he joined President Emmanuel Macron for the traditional Bastille Day military parade in Paris, which honoured European military cooperation and the European Intervention Initiative that year.

=== Health ===
In December 2017, Marcelo Rebelo de Sousa underwent emergency surgery at Curry Cabral Hospital in order to treat an incarcerated umbilical hernia. The procedure was performed by Eduardo Barroso, a friend of the president. He was discharged from the hospital and lauded the Portuguese National Health Service, considering it an important achievement of Portuguese democracy.

In June 2018, Marcelo Rebelo de Sousa was briefly hospitalized after he collapsed after a visit to Bom Jesus do Monte sanctuary in Braga; the incident was caused by a sudden drop in blood pressure alongside acute gastroenteritis.

In October 2019, he underwent planned cardiac catheterization at Santa Cruz Hospital, Carnaxide, in the outskirts of Lisbon, after accumulated calcium was detected in one of his coronary arteries.

On 8 March 2020, Marcelo Rebelo de Sousa suspended all his public agenda and returned to his private home in Cascais, entering a voluntary quarantine period for 14 days after being revealed that a group of students from Felgueiras, who had visited Belém Palace some days before, had also been quarantined after a positive case of COVID-19 was detected in their school. Marcelo subsequently tested negative for the virus and worked remotely for a period during the COVID-19 pandemic.

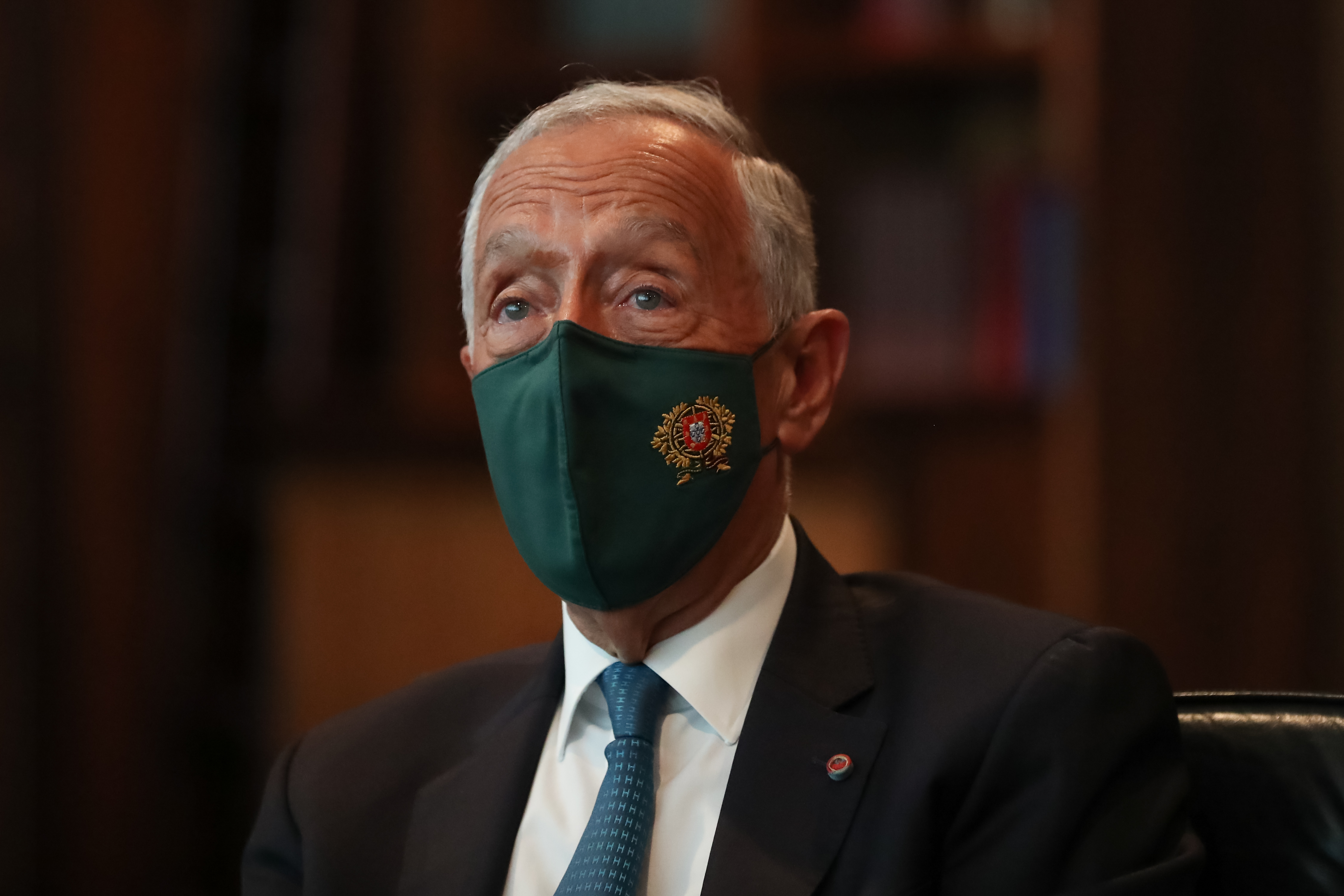
Marcelo Rebelo de Sousa wearing a protective mask in 2021, during the COVID-19 pandemic

On 11 January 2021, Marcelo Rebelo de Sousa tested positive for COVID-19, after a contact with a positive case in his staff. He was reportedly asymptomatic, and canceled his appointments, opting to remain in self-isolation. Three further COVID-19 tests yielded negative results. Some physicians said that a false positive PCR-RT test, although possible, was unlikely, and tentatively attributed the subsequent negative tests to a low viral load. On 13 January, however, the Lisbon and Tagus Valley regional public health authority confirmed that the president was considered to have had a low-risk exposure, and was therefore simply under passive surveillance for two weeks: the president was instructed that he could resume his agenda save for any events in crowded public places.

In December 2021, he underwent planned surgery to remove two inguinal hernias at the Military Hospital in Lisbon.

On 5 July 2023, Marcelo Rebelo de Sousa collapsed during a visit to the NOVA University School of Science and Technology, in Almada. He was taken to Santa Cruz Hospital "as a precaution". His chief of staff, Fernando Frutuoso de Melo, assured the situation was probably due to the heat and to the president's "heavy schedule". After being submitted to several medical exams, the president was discharged four hours later, with a Holter monitor, and addressed journalists on his way out from the hospital, saying he had had an episode of low blood pressure since he had skipped lunch — as he usually does, replacing it with Fortimel, a medical nutrition supplement — and had been offered a glass of warm moscatel shortly before he fainted that "must have upset, probably, [his] digestion". The physicians recommended rest, though the president's personal physician, Daniel de Matos, remarked their recommendation would in all likelihood fall on deaf ears. His scheduled presence at several events was nonetheless cancelled until 9 July, but the president recorded video messages to be displayed at those events. Only indoor audiences at Belém Palace remained scheduled.

On 1 December 2025, Marcelo Rebelo de Sousa was admitted to University Hospital of São João, in Porto, for urgent surgery due to an incarcerated hernia, after feeling unwell.

== Personal life ==
On 22 July 1972, Marcelo Rebelo de Sousa married Ana Cristina da Gama Caeiro da Mota Veiga in the parish of São Miguel de Machede in Évora. His wife, born on 4 June 1950 in the Santos-o-Velho parish of Lisbon, is the daughter of António da Mota Veiga and Maria Emília da Gama Caeiro. In the following years, Sousa and Mota Veiga had two children:

- Nuno da Mota Veiga Rebelo de Sousa (b. São Sebastião da Pedreira, Lisbon, 8 August 1973) and
- Sofia da Mota Veiga Rebelo de Sousa (b. São Sebastião da Pedreira, Lisbon, 27 September 1976).

The couple separated in 1980 and divorced in 1983, although Marcelo, citing his Roman Catholic faith, believes marriage lasts until death. He started dating his former student Rita Amaral Cabral in 1981, who at the time was his fellow lecturer at the Faculty of Law of the University of Lisbon. They continue to entertain a casual relationship, but live separately.

== Controversies ==
In 2023, President of Portugal Marcelo Rebelo de Sousa became embroiled in a controversy following a TVI program that suggested he had intervened to expedite treatment for Brazilian twins with Zolgensma, a rare and highly expensive drug administered in a single dose costing two million euros. Allegations of corruption and influence peddling have emerged surrounding this event, also implicating the president's son, who is reportedly a friend of well-connected Brazilians linked to the family of the Brazilian children. These claims have been raised by various sectors of Portuguese politics and the media. Between July 2019 and July 2021, Infarmed, the Portuguese medicines agency, approved 17 applications for authorisation of the medicine given to the Brazilian twins. In most cases, authorisation took no more than a day.

On 23 April 2024, he compared the current and previous prime ministers, saying that "António Costa was slow, because he is oriental" and Luís Montenegro, a rural personality in Sousa's opinion, "is not oriental but he is slow", at a dinner with foreign journalists.

On 27 August 2025, while addressing university students at a PSD Summer University event in Castelo de Vide, Rebelo de Sousa called the US president, Donald Trump, a "Russian asset", after the 2025 Russia–United States Summit. He further clarified that American leadership has recently favored the Russian Federation.

== Electoral history ==
=== Lisbon City Council election, 1989 ===
Ballot: 17 December 1989
Party	Candidate	Votes	%	Seats	+/−
PS/CDU/MDP/CDE	Jorge Sampaio	180,635	49.1	9	+1
PSD/CDS/PPM	Marcelo Rebelo de Sousa	154,888	42.1	8	–1
PRD	Hermínio Martinho	11,453	3.1	0	new
PCTP/MRPP	Garcia Pereira	6,390	1.7	0	±0
FER	Gil Garcia	1,326	0.4	0	new
Blank/Invalid ballots		13,433	3.7	–	–
Turnout		368,125	54.76	17	±0
Source: Autárquicas 1989

=== PSD leadership election, 1996 ===
Ballot: 30 March 1996
Candidate	Votes	%
Marcelo Rebelo de Sousa	603	66.4
Pedro Santana Lopes	305	33.6
Turnout	908	
Source: Results

=== Presidential election, 2016 ===
Ballot: 24 January 2016
Candidate	Votes	%
Marcelo Rebelo de Sousa	2,413,956	52.0
Sampaio da Nóvoa	1,062,138	22.9
Marisa Matias	469,814	10.1
Maria de Belém	196,765	4.2
Edgar Silva	183,051	3.9
Vitorino Silva	152,374	3.3
Paulo de Morais	100,191	2.2
Henrique Neto	39,163	0.8
Jorge Sequeira	13,954	0.3
Cândido Ferreira	10,609	0.2
Blank/Invalid ballots	102,552	–
Turnout	4,744,567	48.66
Source: Comissão Nacional de Eleições

=== Presidential election, 2021 ===
Ballot: 24 January 2021
Candidate	Votes	%
Marcelo Rebelo de Sousa	2,531,692	60.7
Ana Gomes	540,823	13.0
André Ventura	497,746	11.9
João Ferreira	179,764	4.3
Marisa Matias	165,127	4.0
Tiago Mayan Gonçalves	134,991	3.2
Vitorino Silva	123,031	3.0
Blank/Invalid ballots	85,182	–
Turnout	4,258,356	39.26
Source: Comissão Nacional de Eleições

== Honours and awards ==
=== Portuguese orders ===
==== Insignia of Office ====
- Grand Master of the Honorific Orders of Portugal (2016 – 2026)

==== Ancient Military Orders ====
- Grand Collar of the Military Order of the Tower and Sword (9 March 2021)
- Commander of the Order of Saint James of the Sword (9 June 1994)

==== National Orders ====
- Grand Cross of the Order of Prince Henry (9 June 2005)
- Grand Collar of the Order of Liberty (9 March 2026)

=== Foreign orders ===
- Algeria: Collar of the National Order of Merit (23 May 2023)
- Angola: Collar of the Order of Agostinho Neto (6 March 2019)
- Austria: Grand Star of the Decoration of Honour for Services to the Republic of Austria (12 June 2019)
- Belgium: Grand Cordon of the Order of Leopold (22 October 2018)
- Brazil: Grand Collar of the Order of the Southern Cross (29 May 2023)
- Bulgaria: Grand Cross of the Order of the Balkan Mountains (30 January 2019)
- Cape Verde: 1st Class of the Amílcar Cabral Order (7 April 2017)
- Chile: Collar of the Order of Merit (27 March 2017)
- Croatia: Grand Cross of the Grand Order of King Tomislav (4 May 2018)
- Cyprus: Grand Collar of the Order of Makarios III (8 October 2022)
- Dominican Republic: Grand Cross with Gold Breast Star of the Order of Merit of Duarte, Sánchez and Mella (23 March 2023)
- East Timor: Grand Collar of the Order of Timor-Leste (19 May 2022)
- Estonia: Collar of the Order of the Cross of Terra Mariana (16 April 2019)
- France: Grand Cross of the National Order of the Legion of Honour (26 August 2016)
- Greece: Grand Cross of the Order of the Redeemer (21 April 2017)
- Guinea-Bissau: Amílcar Cabral Medal (19 May 2021)
- Holy See: Knight with the Collar of the Order of Pius IX (7 July 2016)
- Hungary: Grand Cross with Chain of the Order of Merit of the Republic of Hungary (23 February 2023)
- Italy: Knight Grand Cross with Collar of the Order of Merit of the Italian Republic (29 November 2017)
- Latvia: Commander Grand Cross with Chain of the Order of the Three Stars (12 April 2023)
- Luxembourg: Knight of the Order of the Gold Lion of the House of Nassau (23 May 2017)
- Malta: Honorary Companion of Honour with Collar of the National Order of Merit (15 May 2018)
- Mexico: Collar of the Order of the Aztec Eagle (17 July 2017)
- Moldova: Plaque of the Order of Honour (2 October 2023)
- Monaco: Knight Grand Cross of the Order of Saint Charles (21 November 2025)
- Morocco: Collar of the Order of Muhammad (27 June 2016)
- Netherlands:
  - Grand Cross of the Order of the Crown (13 December 2024)
  - Knight Grand Cross of the Order of the Netherlands Lion (3 October 2017)
- Paraguay: Collar of the National Order of Merit (11 May 2017)
- Peru: Grand Cross with diamonds of the Order of the Sun of Peru (25 February 2019)
- Poland: Knight of the Order of the White Eagle (11 August 2023)
- Romania: Collar of the Order of the Star (3 October 2023)
- Senegal: Grand Cross of the National Order of the Lion (12 April 2017)
- Serbia: Second Class of the Order of the Republic of Serbia (11 January 2017)
- Slovakia: Grand Cross of the Order of the White Double Cross (26 November 2025)
- Slovenia: Recipient of the Order for Exceptional Merits (31 May 2021)
- Spain:
  - Collar of the Order of Charles III (13 April 2018)
  - Knight of the Collar of the Order of Isabella the Catholic (28 November 2016)
  - Knight of the Order of the Golden Fleece (21 July 2026)

== Notes ==
Media offices
Preceded by Francisco Pinto Balsemão	Director of Expresso; 1980–1981	Succeeded by Augusto de Carvalho
Political offices
Preceded by Fernando Amaral	Minister of Parliamentary Affairs; 1982–1983	Succeeded by António de Almeida Santos
Preceded by Fernando Nogueira	Leader of the Opposition; 1996–1999	Succeeded by José Manuel Barroso
Preceded by Aníbal Cavaco Silva	President of Portugal; 2016–2026	Succeeded by António José Seguro
Party political offices
Preceded by Fernando Nogueira	President of the Social Democratic Party; 1996–1999	Succeeded by José Manuel Barroso
Academic offices
Preceded by Donald Tusk	Invocation Speaker of the College of Europe; 2020	Succeeded by Alexander De Croo
