= 2016 Portuguese presidential election =

- 24 January 2016
- Opinion polls
- Turnout: 48.66% (▲2.14pp)
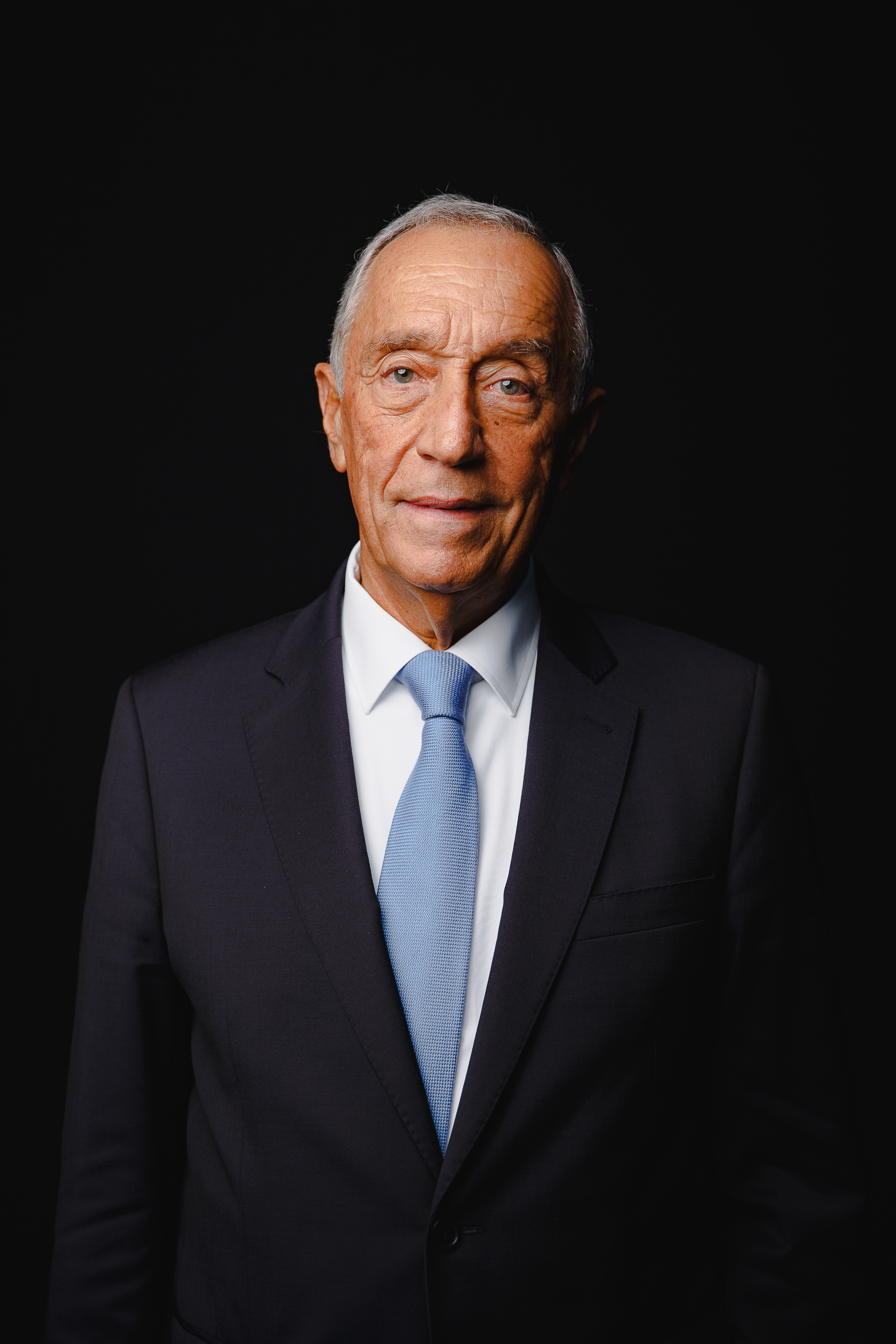

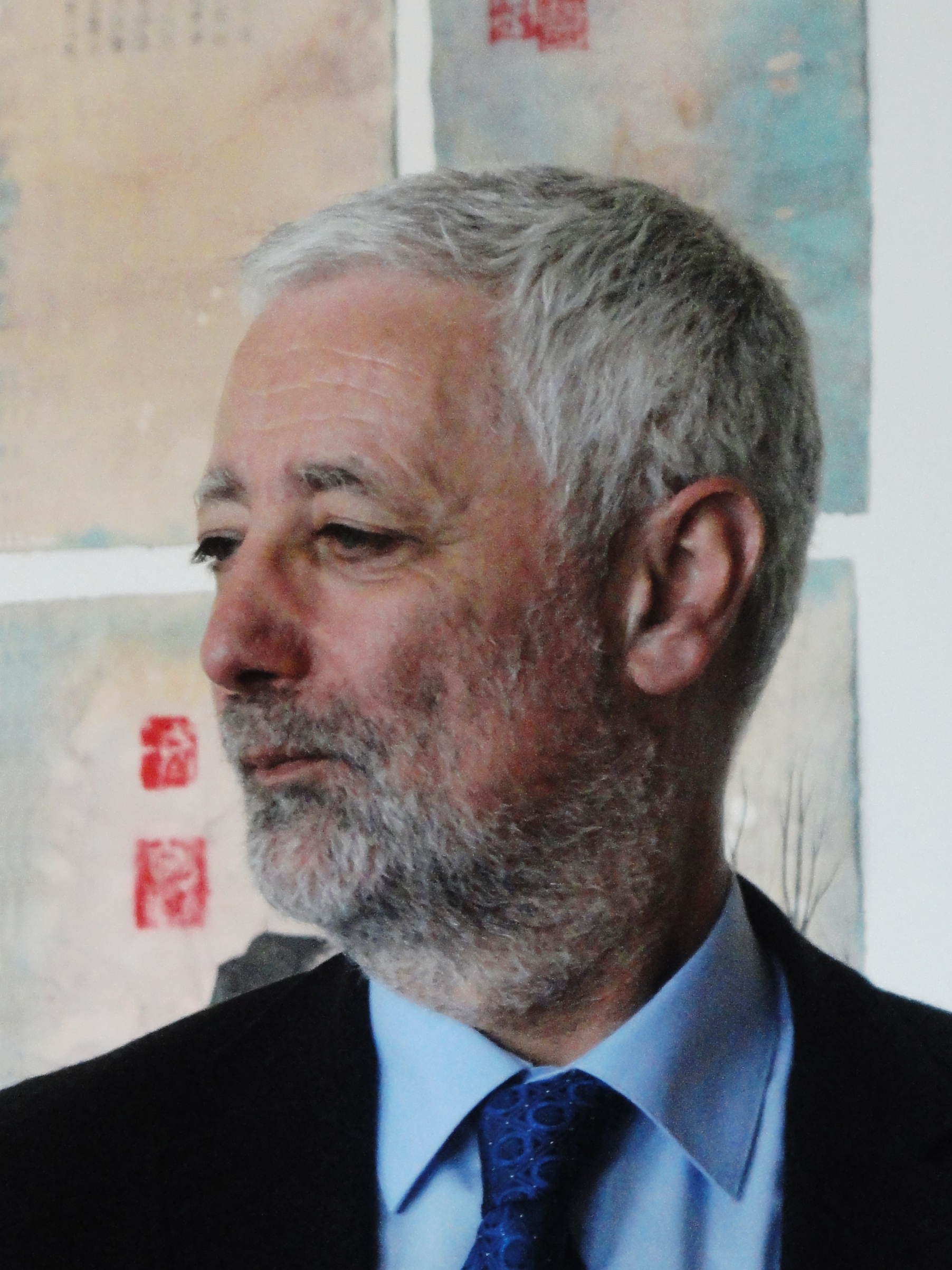

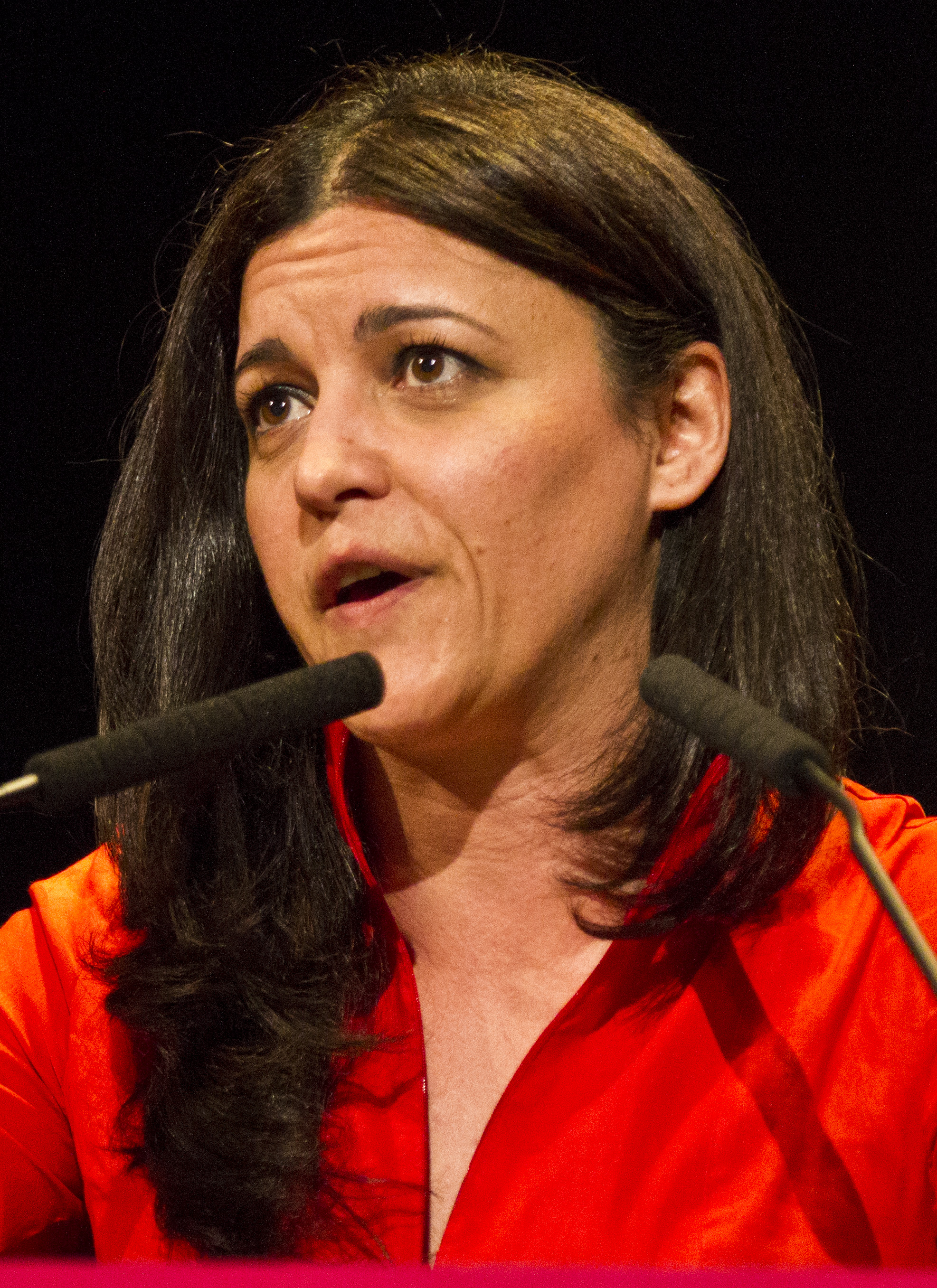
Candidate	Marcelo Rebelo de Sousa	António Sampaio da Nóvoa	Marisa Matias
Party	PSD Supported by: CDS–PP; PPM	Independent Supported by: PCTP/MRPP; L/TDA	BE Supported by: MAS
Popular vote	2,413,956	1,062,138	469,814
Percentage	52.00%	22.88%	10.12%
- Results by district
President before election
Aníbal Cavaco Silva
PSD
Elected President
Marcelo Rebelo de Sousa
PSD

A presidential election was held in Portugal on 24 January 2016. The election chose the successor of President Aníbal Cavaco Silva, who was constitutionally not allowed to run for a third consecutive term.

Marcelo Rebelo de Sousa, the candidate supported by Social Democratic Party (PSD), CDS – People's Party (CDS–PP) and People's Monarchist Party (PPM), won the election on the first round with 52% of the vote. Marcelo also won in every single district in the country and only lost a few municipalities in the south of the country. The Socialist Party (PS), for the first time in a Presidential election, did not officially support a candidate, with party members dividing their support for either António Sampaio da Nóvoa or Maria de Belém, which polled 23% and 4%, respectively. The Left Bloc's candidate, Marisa Matias, polled a strong third place, with 10% of the votes, while the communist candidate, Edgar Silva, achieved a very poor result, less than 4% of the votes. One of the big surprises in the election was the result of eccentric candidate Vitorino Silva, polling at 3.3% of the votes, just 30,000 votes behind the communist candidate.

For this election, about 9.7 million voters were registered to cast a ballot by election day. Turnout was higher than that of the 2011 election, but reached a record low in a presidential election with a non incumbent, as only 48.66% of the electorate cast a ballot. Marcelo Rebelo de Sousa was sworn in as President on 9 March 2016.

== Background ==
After being re-elected with 53% of the votes in January 2011, Aníbal Cavaco Silva had served two consecutive five-year terms as president, the maximum number, and the 2016 election was to choose a successor for a term beginning on 9 March. In Portugal, the president is the head of state, has mostly ceremonial powers. However, the president does have some political influence and can dissolve Parliament if a crisis occurs. The president also has an official residence in the Belém Palace in Lisbon. Cavaco Silva's second term was dominated by the IMF/Eurozone bailout to rescue the country's finances and economy. The complex economic situation forced the head of state to mediate talks between parties on several occasions, one of them in 2013, after a government crisis in which Cavaco proposed a "unity government" between the PSD and PS to resolve the crisis, a proposal that was rejected by the parties. The dire economic picture, Cavaco's alignment with the then PSD/CDS–PP government and some controversial positions and gaffes, led to a significant drop in his popularity ratings. For most of his second term, Cavaco Silva coexisted with PSD prime minister Pedro Passos Coelho, with the institutional relationship being a good one, but after the 2015 legislative election, which resulted in relative victory for Passos Coelho's coalition, but with a left-wing majority, the president had to cohabitate with Socialist prime minister António Costa for the last few months of his term. Cavaco Silva nominated Costa as prime minister after the left-wing majority rejected Passos Coelho's second minority government.

=== Pre-campaign ===
Just like in 2006 and 2011, the Socialist Party had no real strategy for the presidential election, while on the PSD, the almost certain candidacy of Marcelo Rebelo de Sousa created doubts in the party's leadership, with party leader Pedro Passos Coelho expressing that the party's supported candidate could not be a "windmill", which was interpreted as a criticism towards Marcelo, despite a later denial from Passos Coelho. After a strong showing in the 2015 legislative election, the Left Bloc hoped to reinforce its position with the candidacy of Marisa Matias while the communists tried to recover from being overtaken by the Left Bloc, but presented a candidate from Madeira, Edgar Silva, with little national recognition.

== Electoral system ==
In order to stand for election, candidates must be of Portuguese origin and over 35 years old, gather 7,500 signatures of support one month before the election, and submit them to the Constitutional Court of Portugal.

Under Portuguese law, a candidate must receive a majority of votes (50% plus one vote) to be elected. If no candidate achieved a majority in the first round, a runoff election (i.e., second round, held between the two candidates who received the most votes in the first round) would have been held on February 14.

== Candidates ==
=== Official candidates ===
On 29 December 2015 the Constitutional Court certified a record ten candidates as having met the requirements to appear on the ballot. This remained the highest number of candidates in a Presidential ballot in Portuguese democracy until 2026.

Candidate	Party support	Political office(s)	Details	Announcement date	Ref.
Henrique Neto (79)	None	Member of Parliament for Leiria (1995–1999)	Socialist Party (PS) member; failed to gain the support of the party.	25 March 2015	
Paulo de Morais (52)	None	Deputy Mayor of Porto (2002–2005)	Anti-corruption activist.	18 April 2015	
Cândido Ferreira (66)	None	None	Nephrologist MD; former member of the Socialist Party (PS); former Chair of the Leiria Federation of the Socialist Party (1995–1999).	25 April 2015	
António Sampaio da Nóvoa (61)	Portuguese Workers' Communist Party; LIVRE/Time to Move Forward	None	Former Dean of the University of Lisbon (2006–2013); one of the two candidates endorsed by the Socialist Party (PS).	29 April 2015	
Jorge Sequeira (66)	None	None	Psychologist, researcher and university professor.	23 July 2015	
Edgar Silva (53)	Portuguese Communist Party	Member of the Legislative Assembly of Madeira (1996–2024)	Former Catholic priest; member of the Central Committee of the Portuguese Communist Party (PCP).	8 October 2015	
Marcelo Rebelo de Sousa (67)	Social Democratic Party; CDS – People's Party; People's Monarchist Party	Member of the Council of State (2006–2016); President of the Social Democratic Party (1996–1999); Minister of Parliamentary Affairs (1982–1983); Member of the Constituent Assembly (1975–1976)	Social Democratic Party (PSD) member; jurist; university professor; political commentator.	9 October 2015	
Maria de Belém Roseira (66)	None	President of the Socialist Party (2011–2014); President of the Parliamentary Group of the Socialist Party (2011); Minister of Equality (1999–2000); Minister of Health (1995–1999) Other offices: Member of Parliament for Lisbon (2005–2009; 2011–2015) Member of Parliament for Aveiro (2002–2005; 2009–2011) Member of Parliament for Porto (1999–2002)	Member of the Socialist Party (PS); was one of the two candidates endorsed by the party.	13 October 2015	
Marisa Matias (39)	Left Bloc; Socialist Alternative Movement	Member of the European Parliament (2009–2024)	Left Bloc (BE) member; sociologist, who has worked in the areas of environment and public health.	18 October 2015	
Vitorino Silva (44)	None	President of the Parish Council of Rans (1994–2002)	More commonly known as Tino de Rans; paver; former member of the Socialist Party (PS).	23 October 2015	

=== Unsuccessful candidates ===
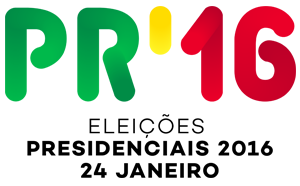
Official logo of the election.

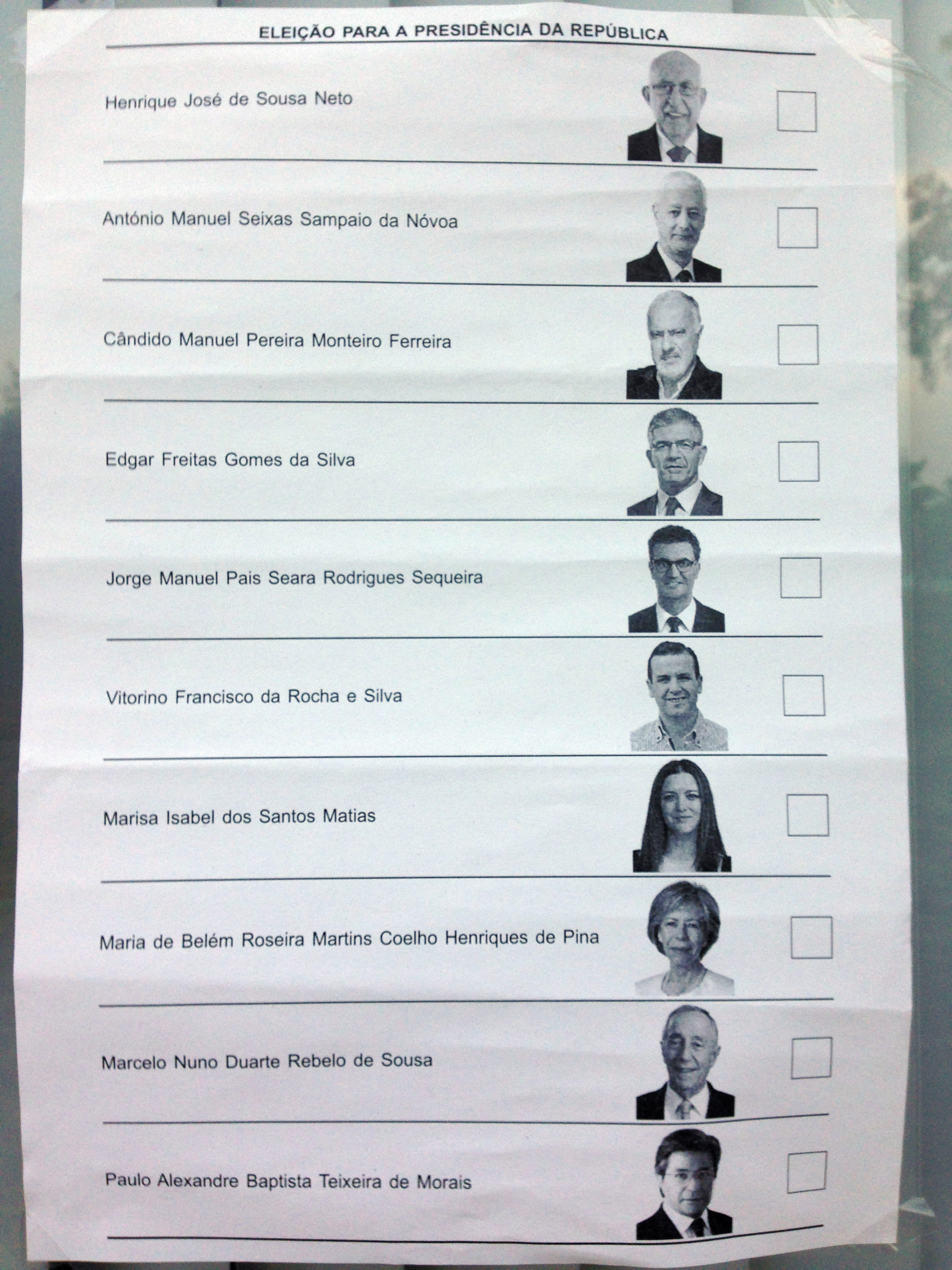
Ballot paper for the 2016 Portuguese presidential election.

- Manuel João Vieira, singer, independent candidate.
- Manuel Almeida, independent.
- Paulo Freitas do Amaral, university professor, former president of the parish of Cruz Quebrada; withdrew and supported Marcelo Rebelo de Sousa.
- Orlando Cruz, withdrew in favour of Marcelo Rebelo de Sousa.
- Graça Castanho, withdrew due to having lost her nomination signatures in a storm.
- Castanheira Barros, independent candidate, former member of the Social Democratic Party; withdrew and supported Marcelo Rebelo de Sousa.
- Manuela Gonzaga, historian and writer; was supported by the People–Animals–Nature.

=== Decided not to run ===
- Fernando Nobre – Independent candidate which had contested the previous presidential election.
- António Vitorino – former European Commissioner (1999–2004).
- António Capucho – former Mayor of Cascais (2001–2011).
- Paulo Portas – former leader of the CDS – People's Party (1998–2005, 2007–2016), former Minister of National Defence (2002–2005) and of Foreign Affairs (2011–2013) and also former Deputy Prime Minister (2013–2015).
- Manuela Ferreira Leite – former leader of the Social Democratic Party (2008–2010).
- António Guterres – former Prime Minister (1995–2002).
- Manuel Carvalho da Silva – former union leader of CGTP (1986–2012).
- Pedro Santana Lopes – former Prime Minister (2004–2005).
- Rui Rio – former mayor of Porto (2002–2013).
- Alberto João Jardim – former President of the Regional Government of Madeira (1978-2015).

== Campaign period ==
=== Issues ===
During the campaign, Marcelo Rebelo de Sousa acted mostly alone, with no PSD party machine behind him nor campaign posters or rallies. His high popularity and notoriety, after years as a political commentator on television, helped his campaign by presenting himself as a "moderate", someone "to the left of the right", and a break with Cavaco Silva's more distant image, replaced by a more spontaneous and affectionate one on Marcelo's part. Initially, the Socialist Party (PS) leadership was inclined to support António Sampaio da Nóvoa, despite internal divisions, however, the announcement of Maria de Belém's candidacy led the party to not support a single candidate, but with the then party leader António Costa appealing for votes for Sampaio da Nóvoa or Maria de Belém. Sampaio da Nóvoa, who also considered withdrawing from the race after the PS' defeat in the 2015 Portuguese legislative election, but later dropped the idea, labeled Marcelo as the "fast food" candidate, while other candidates, such as Paulo Morais and Henrique Neto, raised issues like corruption and the country's lack of strategy.

=== Candidates' slogans ===
Candidate	Original slogan	English translation	Refs
Marcelo Rebelo de Sousa	« Juntos por Portugal »	"Together for Portugal"	
Sampaio da Nóvoa	« Um Cidadão Presidente »	"A Citizen President"	
Marisa Matias	« Uma por todos »	"One for all"	
Maria de Belém	« Belém, a força do caráter »	"Belém, the strength of character"	
Edgar Silva	« Um homem justo para presidente »	"A fair man for president"	
Vitorino Silva	« Portugal com Tino »	"Portugal with Tino" (Note: "Tino" is a diminutive for Vitorino, but the noun "tino" means "prudence" or "discernment")	
Paulo de Morais	« Meter o país em ordem »	"Get the country in order"	
Henrique Neto	« Porque Portugal precisa »	"Because Portugal needs"	
Jorge Sequeira	« Portugal somos nós »	"Portugal is us"	
Cândido Ferreira	« Pelo nosso futuro »	"For our future"	

=== Candidates' debates ===
There were several number of debates between all the candidates in the three TV networks RTP, SIC, TVI. There was a radio debate between all candidates plus on January 19, there was a final debate between all of candidates on RTP1.

Completed televised debates:

2016 Portuguese presidential election debates
Date	Organizers	Moderators	P Present NI Non-invitee A Absent invitee										Notes
Date	Organizers	Moderators	Neto	Nóvoa	Ferreira	Silva	Sequeira	Vitorino	Matias	Belém	Marcelo	Morais	Notes
1 January; 20:35	RTP1	José Rodrigues dos Santos	NI	P	NI	NI	NI	NI	P	NI	NI	NI	
1 January; 21:30	SIC Notícias	Anselmo Crespo	NI	NI	NI	NI	NI	NI	NI	P	NI	P	
1 January; 22:00	TVI24	Paulo Magalhães	P	NI	NI	P	NI	NI	NI	NI	NI	NI	
1 January; 23:30	TVI24	Paulo Magalhães	NI	NI	NI	NI	P	P	NI	NI	P	NI	
2 January; 20:40	RTP1	José Rodrigues dos Santos	P	P	NI	NI	NI	NI	NI	NI	NI	NI	
2 January; 21:30	TVI24	Paulo Magalhães	NI	NI	NI	NI	NI	NI	P	NI	NI	P	
2 January; 22:00	SIC Notícias	Anselmo Crespo	NI	NI	NI	P	NI	NI	NI	P	NI	NI	
3 January; 20:40	RTP1	José Rodrigues dos Santos	NI	NI	NI	P	NI	NI	NI	NI	NI	P	
3 January; 21:30	SIC Notícias	Anselmo Crespo	P	NI	NI	NI	NI	NI	NI	NI	P	NI	
3 January; 22:00	TVI24	Paulo Magalhães	NI	NI	NI	NI	NI	NI	P	P	NI	NI	
4 January; 10:10	Antena 1	Maria Flor Pedroso	P	P	P	P	P	P	P	P	P	P	
4 January; 20:40	RTP1	João Adelino Faria	P	NI	NI	NI	NI	NI	NI	P	NI	NI	
4 January; 21:30	SIC Notícias	Anselmo Crespo	NI	NI	NI	NI	NI	NI	P	NI	P	NI	
4 January; 22:00	TVI24	Paulo Magalhães	NI	P	NI	P	NI	NI	NI	NI	NI	NI	
5 January; 20:40	RTP1	João Adelino Faria	NI	NI	NI	P	NI	NI	NI	P	NI	NI	
5 January; 21:30	SIC Notícias	Anselmo Crespo	P	NI	NI	NI	NI	NI	P	NI	NI	NI	
5 January; 22:00	TVI24	Paulo Magalhães	NI	P	NI	NI	NI	NI	NI	NI	NI	P	
5 January; 23:00	SIC Notícias	Anselmo Crespo	NI	P	A	NI	P	P	NI	NI	NI	NI	
6 January; 20:40	RTP1	João Adelino Faria	NI	NI	NI	P	NI	NI	P	NI	NI	NI	
6 January; 21:45	TVI24	Paulo Magalhães	NI	NI	NI	NI	NI	NI	NI	NI	P	P	
6 January; 23:30	SIC Notícias	Anselmo Crespo	P	NI	NI	NI	NI	NI	NI	NI	NI	P	
7 January; 20:50	SIC	Clara de Sousa	NI	P	NI	NI	NI	NI	NI	NI	P	NI	
7 January; 20:40	RTP1	João Adelino Faria	NI	NI	A	NI	P	P	NI	P	NI	NI	
8 January; 20:40	RTP1	João Adelino Faria	NI	NI	NI	NI	NI	NI	NI	P	P	NI	
9 January; 20:45	TVI	Judite de Sousa	NI	P	NI	NI	NI	NI	NI	P	NI	NI	
19 January; 21:00	RTP1	Carlos Daniel; Vítor Gonçalves	P	P	P	P	P	P	P	A	P	P	(Note: Maria de Belém Roseira was invited to the debate, but did not participate because of the death, the day before, of António de Almeida Santos, her supporter in the campaign.)

== Opinion polling ==
View source data.

== Campaign budgets ==
Candidate (party)	Election Result	State Subsidy		Political Parties Contributions	Fundraising	Total Revenue		Expenses	Debt
Candidate (party)	Election Result	Calculated	Budgeted	Political Parties Contributions	Fundraising	Calculated	Budgeted	Expenses	Debt
Marcelo R. Sousa (PSD, CDS-PP, PPM)	52.0%	€165,489	€90,000	€0	€67,000	€224,409	€157,000	€179,508	€0
Sampaio da Nóvoa (PCTP/MRPP, L/TDA)	22.9%	€896,929	€798,000	€0	€84,313	€1,008,321	€968,000	€924,494	€0
Marisa Matias (BE, MAS)	10.1%	€290,216	€308,660	€281,000	€146,000	€883,305	€454,660	€601,715	€0
Maria de Belém (I)	4.2%	€0	€790,656	€0	€105,970	€94,280	€896,626	€541,897	€447,617
Edgar Silva (PCP, PEV)	3.9%	€0	€377,750	€342,250	€30,000	€581,114	€750,000	€750,000	€168,886
Vitorino Silva (I)	3.3%	€0	€0	€0	€50,000	€8,172	€50,000	€8,160	€0
Paulo de Morais (I)	2.2%	€0	€61,000	€0	€32,000	€23,949	€93,000	€59,539	€35,590
Henrique Neto (I)	0.8%	€0	€199,000	€0	€76,000	€67,927	€275,000	€248,772	€180,845
Jorge Sequeira (I)	0.3%	€0	€0	€0	€123,500	€6,161	€123,500	€6,041	€0
Cândido Ferreira (I)	0.2%	€0	€0	€0	€60,000	€32,633	€60,000	€32,633	€0
Source: Portuguese Constitutional Court (TC)

== Voter turnout ==
The table below shows voter turnout throughout election day including voters from Overseas.

Turnout	Time								
Turnout	12:00			16:00			19:00		
Turnout	2011	2016	±	2011	2016	±	2011	2016	±
Total	13.39%	15.82%	▲2.43 pp	35.16%	37.69%	▲2.53 pp	46.52%	48.66%	▲2.14 pp

== Results ==
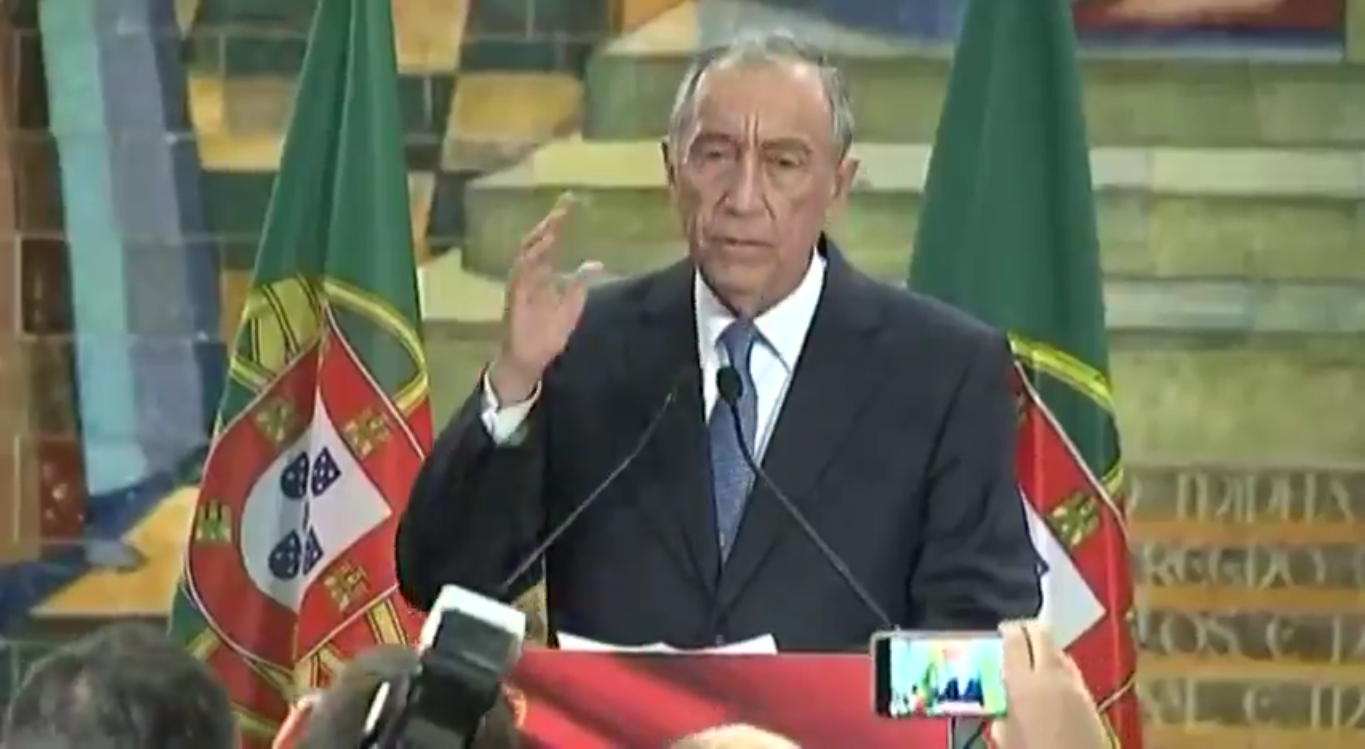
Marcelo Rebelo de Sousa delivering his victory speech after being elected President.

=== National summary ===
Candidate	Party	Votes	%
Marcelo Rebelo de Sousa	Social Democratic Party (Note: Also supported by CDS – People's Party and the People's Monarchist Party.)	2,413,956	52.00
António Sampaio da Nóvoa	Independent (Note: Supported by the Portuguese Workers' Communist Party and LIVRE.)	1,062,138	22.88
Marisa Matias	Left Bloc (Note: Also supported by the Socialist Alternative Movement.)	469,814	10.12
Maria de Belém	Independent (Note: Even though she is a member of Socialist Party, the party did not officially back any candidate)	196,765	4.24
Edgar Silva	Portuguese Communist Party (Note: Also supported by the Ecologist Party "The Greens".)	183,051	3.94
Vitorino Silva	Independent	152,374	3.28
Paulo de Morais	Independent	100,191	2.16
Henrique Neto	Independent	39,163	0.84
Jorge Sequeira	Independent	13,954	0.30
Cândido Ferreira	Independent	10,609	0.23
Total		4,642,015	100.00
Valid votes		4,642,015	97.84
Invalid votes		43,588	0.92
Blank votes		58,964	1.24
Total votes		4,744,567	100.00
Registered voters/turnout		9,751,398	48.66
Source: Comissão Nacional de Eleições

=== Results by district ===
District	Marcelo		Nóvoa		Matias		Belém		Edgar Silva		Vitorino Silva		Morais		Neto		Sequeira		Ferreira		Turnout
District	Votes	%	Votes	%	Votes	%	Votes	%	Votes	%	Votes	%	Votes	%	Votes	%	Votes	%	Votes	%	Turnout
Aveiro	189,380	59.42%	59,149	18.56%	29,392	9.22%	12,996	4.08%	5,029	1.58%	12,296	3.86%	6,372	2.00%	2,397	0.75%	983	0.31%	708	0.22%	49.88%
Azores	39,811	58.07%	14,768	21.54%	6,073	8.86%	3,041	4.44%	907	1.32%	1,522	2.22%	1,457	2.13%	577	0.84%	212	0.31%	190	0.29%	30.92%
Beja	18,911	31.71%	18,770	31.47%	6,741	11.30%	3,046	5.11%	9,290	15.58%	1,354	2.27%	724	1.21%	412	0.69%	189	0.32%	209	0.35%	47.37%
Braga	244,205	58.96%	82,976	20.03%	34,686	8.37%	16,318	3.94%	7,676	1.85%	14,951	3.61%	7,210	1.74%	3,234	0.78%	2,071	0.50%	866	0.21%	53.53%
Bragança	36,173	61.91%	11,484	19.65%	4,253	7.28%	2,688	4.60%	701	1.20%	1,582	2.71%	783	1.34%	452	0.77%	152	0.26%	161	0.28%	40.46%
Castelo Branco	44,199	50.14%	22,924	26.01%	9,538	10.62%	4,565	5.18%	2,013	2.28%	2,338	2.65%	1,524	1.73%	737	0.84%	217	0.25%	268	0.30%	50.06%
Coimbra	94,184	50.19%	43,577	23.22%	26,101	13.91%	8,561	4.56%	4,186	2.23%	4,973	2.65%	3,577	1.91%	1,440	0.77%	362	0.19%	703	0.37%	49.21%
Évora	27,281	38.61%	21,405	30.30%	7,609	10.77%	2,908	4.12%	8,137	11.52%	1,492	2.11%	1,032	1.46%	421	0.60%	186	0.26%	181	0.26%	51.09%
Faro	76,560	47.62%	38,311	23.83%	22,155	13.78%	7,071	4.40%	5,710	3.55%	4,290	2.67%	4,767	2.96%	1,144	0.71%	379	0.24%	392	0.24%	44.35%
Guarda	42,087	58.53%	15,549	21.62%	6,316	8.78%	3,096	4.31%	1,006	1.40%	2,108	2.93%	882	1.23%	482	0.67%	180	0.25%	198	0.28%	45.17%
Leiria	126,494	61.07%	35,253	17.02%	19,630	9.48%	6,540	3.16%	4,169	2.01%	6,142	2.97%	4,110	1.98%	3,401	1.64%	425	0.21%	966	0.47%	50.18%
Lisbon	496,372	49.77%	257,593	25.83%	100,125	10.04%	44,743	4.49%	39,919	4.00%	21,302	2.14%	23,444	2.35%	10,207	1.02%	2,062	0.21%	1,517	0.15%	53.63%
Madeira	58,423	51.35%	12,825	11.27%	11,448	10.06%	3,157	2.78%	22,414	19.70%	1,044	0.92%	2,699	2.37%	884	0.78%	498	0.44%	372	0.33%	45.50%
Portalegre	20,945	42.88%	14,934	30.57%	4,910	10.05%	2,208	4.52%	3,484	7.13%	1,122	2.30%	582	1.19%	285	0.58%	113	0.23%	261	0.53%	49.46%
Porto	428,067	51.28%	181,698	21.76%	85,334	10.22%	37,848	4.53%	20,817	2.49%	47,405	5.68%	22,365	2.68%	6,273	0.75%	3,490	0.42%	1,529	0.18%	53.48%
Santarém	100,119	51.11%	46,150	23.56%	21,080	10.76%	8,722	4.45%	7,976	4.07%	5,873	3.00%	3,652	1.86%	1,346	0.69%	447	0.23%	512	0.26%	51.06%
Setúbal	135,300	37.89%	106,114	29.71%	46,326	12.97%	15,204	4.26%	33,930	9.50%	8,292	2.32%	8,211	2.30%	2,285	0.64%	843	0.24%	625	0.18%	50.17%
Viana do Castelo	63,744	57.03%	25,613	22.92%	8,540	7.64%	3,686	3.30%	1,769	1.58%	4,256	3.81%	2,663	2.38%	894	0.80%	328	0.29%	275	0.25%	45.10%
Vila Real	58,283	62.28%	18,638	19.92%	6,343	6.78%	3,739	4.00%	1,264	1.35%	2,898	3.10%	1,213	1.30%	760	0.81%	213	0.23%	230	0.25%	41.67%
Viseu	103,394	62.57%	30,993	18.76%	12,002	7.26%	5,974	3.62%	2,608	1.25%	6,705	4.06%	2,282	1.38%	1,117	0.68%	355	0.21%	353	0.21%	45.57%
Overseas	7,993	57.30%	2,666	19.11%	1,160	8.32%	609	4.37%	544	3.90%	149	1.07%	459	3.29%	234	1.68%	66	0.47%	69	0.49%	4.69%
Source: 2016 Presidential election results

=== Maps ===
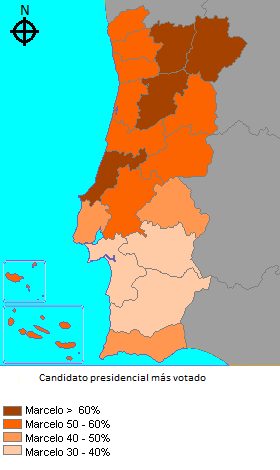
Strongest candidate by electoral district.

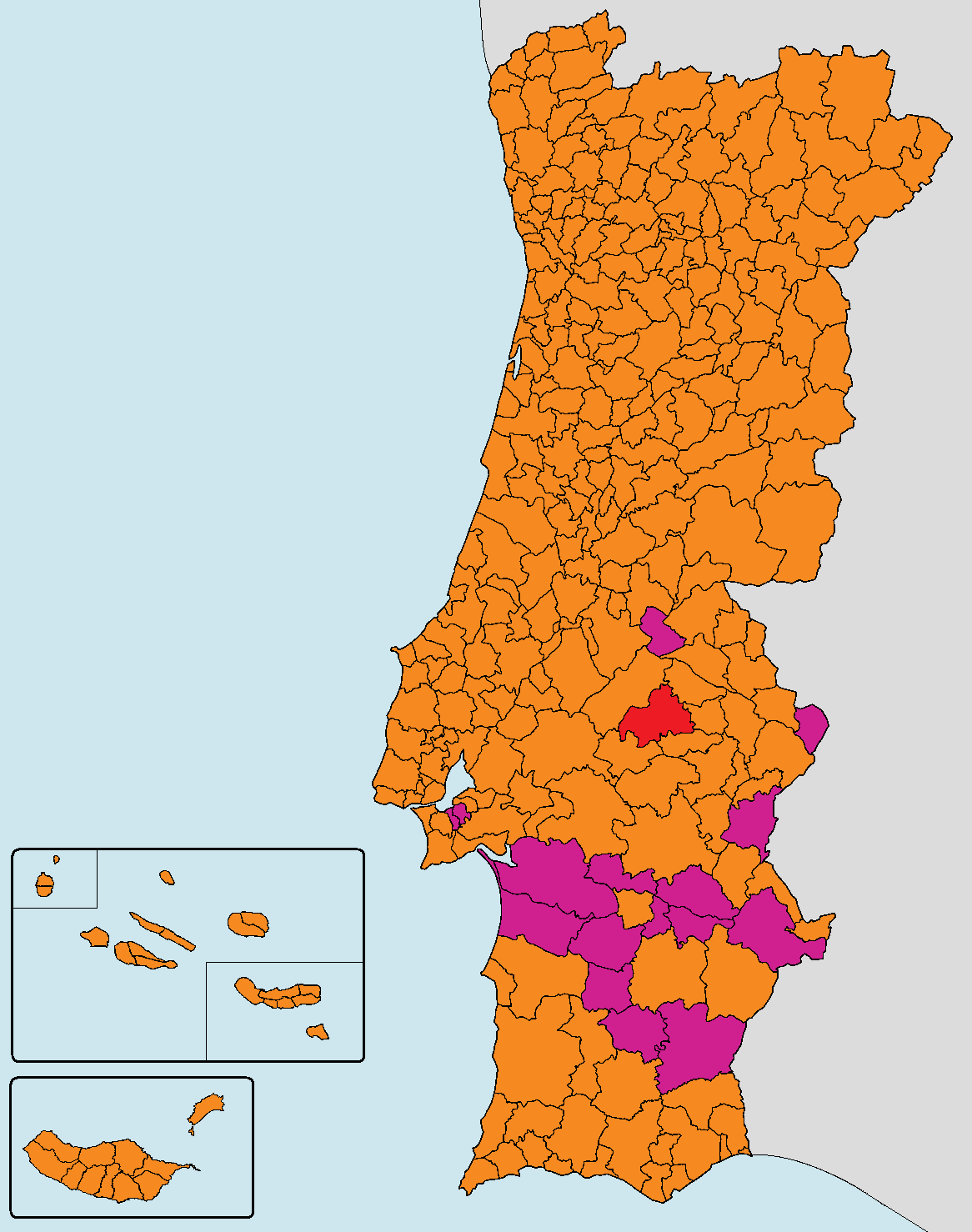
Strongest candidate by municipality: Marcelo - orange; Nóvoa - magenta; Edgar Silva - red.

== See also ==
- President of Portugal
- Politics of Portugal
