= Anabela Rodrigues =

Anabela Rodrigues may refer to:

- Anabela Miranda Rodrigues (born 1953), Portuguese politician from the Social Democratic Party
- Anabela Sousa Rodrigues (born 1972), Portuguese politician from the Socialist Party
- Anabela Rodrigues (MEP) (born 1976), Portuguese politician from the Left Bloc
