= Baltazar Rebelo de Sousa =

Portuguese politician and medicine professor (1921–2001)

Baltazar Rebelo de Sousa GCIH
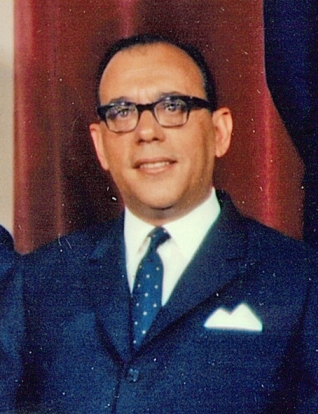
- Baltazar Rebelo de Sousa as Governor-General of Mozambique, 1968

Minister for the Overseas
- In office 7 November 1973 – 25 April 1974
- Prime Minister: Marcello Caetano
- Preceded by: Joaquim da Silva Cunha
- Succeeded by: António de Almeida Santos

Minister of Corporations and Social Security
- In office 15 January 1970 – 7 November 1973
- Prime Minister: Marcello Caetano
- Preceded by: José João Gonçalves de Proença
- Succeeded by: Joaquim Silva Pinto

Minister of Health and Assistance
- In office 15 January 1970 – 7 November 1973
- Prime Minister: Marcello Caetano
- Preceded by: Lopo Cancela de Abreu
- Succeeded by: Clemente Rogeiro

Governor-General of Mozambique
- In office 12 July 1968 – 15 January 1970
- President: Américo Tomás
- Preceded by: José Augusto da Costa Almeida
- Succeeded by: Eduardo de Arantes e Oliveira

Personal details
- Born: Baltazar Leite Rebelo de Sousa; 16 April 1921 Lisbon, Portugal
- Died: 1 December 2002 (aged 81) Lisbon, Portugal
- Children: Marcelo Rebelo de Sousa; (See family)
- Occupation: Politician and medicine professor

Baltazar Leite Rebelo de Sousa (16 April 1921 – 1 December 2002) was a Portuguese politician and medicine professor.

== Background ==
He was the only son of António Joaquim Rebelo de Sousa (Cabeceiras de Basto, Pedraça, Paço de Vides, 8 April 1860 – 7 August 1927), a landowner (already a widower of Rosa da Costa, whom he married in Portuguese Angola and by whom he had five other sons António, Eduardo, Augusto, Álvaro and Óscar Rebelo de Sousa), and second wife Joaquina Leite da Silva, Gandarela, São Clemente, Celorico de Basto 1896? – 16 April 1975), daughter of Manuel Leite da Silva and wife and relative Deolinda Leite. His paternal grandparents were Manuel Joaquim Rebelo de Sousa, a trader, and wife Feliciana de Jesus, daughter of José Mendes de Magalhães and wife Teresa Dias do Nascimento de Jesus, who were also the parents of Baltasar Joaquim (born in 1859), Rosalinda do Nascimento, Bernardino Joaquim, Joaquim and Valentina do Nascimento Rebelo de Sousa.

== Career ==
He was a licentiate in medicine from the Faculty of Medicine of the University of Lisbon. He started his career as a medical doctor.

He was a subsecretary of state for education and a national comissar of the Mocidade Portuguesa. He then became secretary of state and minister of the corporations and health, deputy to the Assembly of the Republic (Assembleia Nacional), vice-president of the Overseas Council, vice-president of the Acção Nacional Popular, Governor-General of Mozambique from 1968 until 1970, and finally the last Minister for the Overseas before the Carnation Revolution. In its aftermath, he went to his ministry where he stood most part of the day and communicated with the rest of the Portuguese Council of Ministers, who were seized in Quartel do Carmo (a military facility in Lisbon). He went into exile in Brazil.

He then became a higher education teacher in São Paulo, São Paulo and the administrator of a company of the Pirelli Group. He also had an active role in Luso-Brazilian associacions, such as the Associação Luso-Brasileira, of which he became the director, also being a member and president of the Curator Council of the Fundação Luso-Brasileira para o Desenvolvimento dos Países de Língua Portuguesa.

== Decorations ==
He was decorated with the Grand Cross of the Order of Prince Henry (Ordem do Infante Dom Henrique), Grand Cross of the Order of Public Instruction and Grand Cross of the Order of the Southern Cross of Brazil.

== Family ==
He married in Lisbon in 1941 or thereabouts, in a simple ceremony with only two of his friends as witnesses, in a union not approved by both parents at the time, to Maria das Neves Fernandes Duarte (Covilhã, Conceição, 30 July 1921 – Lisbon, 8 March 2003), daughter of Joaquim das Neves (b. Covilhã, Erada, 1 January 1874) and wife Maria Rosa Fernandes Duarte (b. Covilhã, 1889?); paternal granddaughter of José Antunes das Neves (son of Francisco de Jesus and wife Maria Antunes) and wife Maria Florência (daughter of José Antunes Castanheira and wife Maria Florência), both born and married in Covilhã, Erada; and maternal granddaughter of Manuel Fernandes Duarte and wife Leonor Rosa; they had three children:

- Marcelo Nuno Duarte Rebelo de Sousa
- António Jorge Duarte Rebelo de Sousa (b. Lisbon, São Sebastião da Pedreira, 31 May 1952), PhD in economics, married in Cascais, Estoril, to Maria Henriqueta Trigueiros de Aragão Pinto de Mesquita (b. 9 December 1952), daughter of Luís Fernando Mexia Pinto de Mesquita and wife (m. Castelo Branco, Alcains, January 8, 1951) Maria Isabel de Portugal Lobo Trigueiros de Aragão, of the Counts of an Idanha-a-Nova and Viscounts of o Outeiro (b. Castelo Branco, Alcains, 28 December 1921), and had issue:
  - Miguel Pinto de Mesquita Rebelo de Sousa (b. Lisbon, São Domingos de Benfica, 18 January 1977), Economist, married to Rita Sofia Marques Alves das Neves Madeira (b. Lisbon, São Cristóvão e São Lourenço, 13 July 1977), Economist, daughter of António das Neves Madeira and wife Maria Manuela Marques Alves Rosa, and had issue:
    - Duarte das Neves Madeira Rebelo de Sousa (b. Lisbon, São Domingos de Benfica, 23 April 2006)
    - Maria das Neves Madeira Rebelo de Sousa (b. Lisbon, São Domingos de Benfica, 7 January 2009)
    - Margarida Maria das Neves Madeira Rebelo de Sousa (b. Lisbon, São Domingos de Benfica, 24 November 2010)
  - Luís Maria Pinto de Mesquita Rebelo de Sousa (b. 30 September 1979), Economist, married to Leonor Estrela de Lacerda (b. 21 February 1980), a Licentiate in Business Administration, daughter of Luís de Lacerda (30 March 1952 – 6 February 1997) and wife Augusta Maria de Jesus Estrela (b. 4 May 1948), and had issue:
    - Luís Maria de Lacerda Rebelo de Sousa (b. Cascais, Estoril, 29 September 2008)
  - Mafalda Maria Pinto de Mesquita Rebelo de Sousa (b. Lisbon, São Domingos de Benfica, 1 February 1983), Lawyer (LL.M and Master in Law), married on 30 May 2009, to Bruno Vinga Santiago (b. August 14, 1976), Lawyer (LL.M. and Master in Law) and had issued:
    - Sebastião Rebelo de Sousa Santiago (b. Lisbon, Mártires, 20 January 2011)
    - Mafalda Maria Rebelo de Sousa Santiago (.b. Santa Maria Maior 3 November 2015)
- Pedro Miguel Duarte Rebelo de Sousa (b. Lisbon, 29 April 1955), a Licentiate in Law from the Faculty of Law of the University of Lisbon and a lawyer, married in Braga, at the Bom Jesus do Monte, on 16 April 1977, to Ana Margarida Lobato de Faria Sacchetti (b. Évora, Sé e São Pedro, 26 October 1956), daughter of António de Vilas-Boas Romano e Vasconcelos Barreto Ferraz Sacchetti (b. 5 February 1928), son of the 3rd Viscount of a Granja, and first wife as her first husband (m. Caminha, Moledo, 27 May 1951, and divorced) Rosa Maria de Bettencourt Rodrigues Lobato de Faria (b. Lisbon, Santa Isabel, 20 April 1932), a poet, and had issue:
  - Mariana Lobato de Faria Sacchetti Rebelo de Sousa (São Paulo, São Paulo, 27 April 1979), a Licentiate in Law and a Lawyer, married on 30 April 2005, to Nuno Miguel Cadima de Oliveira
  - Afonso Lobato de Faria Sacchetti Rebelo de Sousa (São Paulo, São Paulo, 24 June 1981)
