= José Barata-Moura =

Portuguese politician and philosopher

His Magnificence José Barata-Moura GOSE
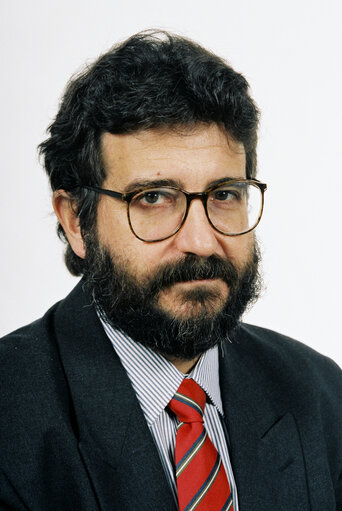

Rector of the University of Lisbon
- In office 1998–2006
- Preceded by: Virgílio Meira Soares
- Succeeded by: António Sampaio da Nóvoa

Personal details
- Born: José Adriano Rodrigues Barata-Moura; 26 June 1948 (age 78) Lisbon, Portugal
- Party: Portuguese Communist Party
- Education: University of Lisbon

José Adriano Rodrigues Barata-Moura, GOSE (born 26 June 1948 in Lisbon) is a Portuguese philosopher, and a prestigious actual figure of the Portuguese culture. Dedicating his thought to many philosophical subjects such as politics, ethics and, most of all, to ontology. From May 7, 1998 until May 22, 2006, Barata-Moura served as the Rector of the University of Lisbon. He graduated from the University of Lisbon as a philosophy student in 1970. Nowadays, José Barata-Moura teaches Ancient Philosophy, the Philosophy of the German Idealism and Marxist Philosophy in the Faculty of Letters of the University of Lisbon. Still very active in his philosophical career, José Barata-Moura is a specialist in the German Idealism Philosophy, specially on Kant and Hegel, without mentioning his vast knowledge of Marxist thought.

He is member of the Presidency of Internationale Gesellschaft für dialektische Philosophie, and member of the Senate of the Convent for Europaische Philosophie und Ideengeschichte. José Barata-Moura is also a Correspondent, in the area of Humanities and Letters, of the Academy of Sciences of Lisbon.

José Barata-Moura was elected as a deputy of the European Parliament during the period 1993-1994.

He is also a longtime member of the Portuguese Communist Party, having written several essays on Marxist subjects.

Barata-Moura is also well known in Portugal as the author of several children's songs (e.g. Come a papa, Joana).

== Books published ==
- 1972 - Kant e o conceito de Filosofia
- 1973 - Da redução das causas em Aristóteles
- 1977 - Estética da canção política
- 1977 - Totalidade e contradição
- 1977 - O coelho barafunda
- 1978 - Ideologia e Prática
- 1979 - EPISTEME. Perspectivas gregas sobre o saber. Heraclito-Platão-Aristóteles
- 1982 - Para uma crítica da "Filosofia dos valores"
- 1986 - Da representação à "práxis"
- 1986 - Ontologias da "práxis", e idealismos
- 1990 - A "realização da razão" - um programa hegeliano?
- 1994 - Marx e a crítica da "Escola Histórica do Direito"
- 1994 - Prática. Para uma aclaração do seu sentido como categoria filosófica
- 1998 - Materialismo e subjectividade
- 1999 - Estudos de Filosofia Portuguesa
- 2007 - O Outro Kant
- 2007 - Da Mentira: Um Ensaio - Transbordante de Errores
- 2010 - Estudos sobre a Ontologia de Hegel. Ser, Verdade, Contradição
- 2010 - Sobre Lénine e a Filosofia. A Reivindicação do Materialismo Dialéctico com Projecto
- 2012 - Totalidade e Contradição Acerca da Dialéctica
- 2013 - Filosofia em "O Capital". Uma Aproximação
- 2014 - Três Ensaios em Torno do Pensamento Político e Estético de Álvaro Cunhal
- 2015 - Marx, Engels e a Crítica do Utopismo
- 2017 - Ontologia e Política. Estudos em Torno de Marx - II
- 2018 - As Teses das «Teses». Para Um Exercício de Leitura
