= Iberomoldes =

Iberomoldes is a Portuguese mould engineering and product development group, with about 1400 employees. The company's headquarters are in Marinha Grande, Portugal, with engineering offices in the United Kingdom, China, Brazil and Sweden. The Iberomoldes group exports 95% of its services and products to several companies abroad.

Iberomoldes Group is composed of 17 companies, including Iber-Oleff, Anibal Abrantes, Edilasio, SET, and Potumolde.

In 2023, Iberomoldes Group sold Iber-Oleff Brazil to Spanish company CIE Automotive for 20 million euros.

Joaquim Menezes is the founder and president of the company.

== History ==
Iberomoldes Group was founded in 1975 (co-founded by Henrique Neto) as a design and marketing company for plastic moulds.
