= Anabela Rodrigues (MEP) =

Portuguese politician

Anabela Rodrigues MEP
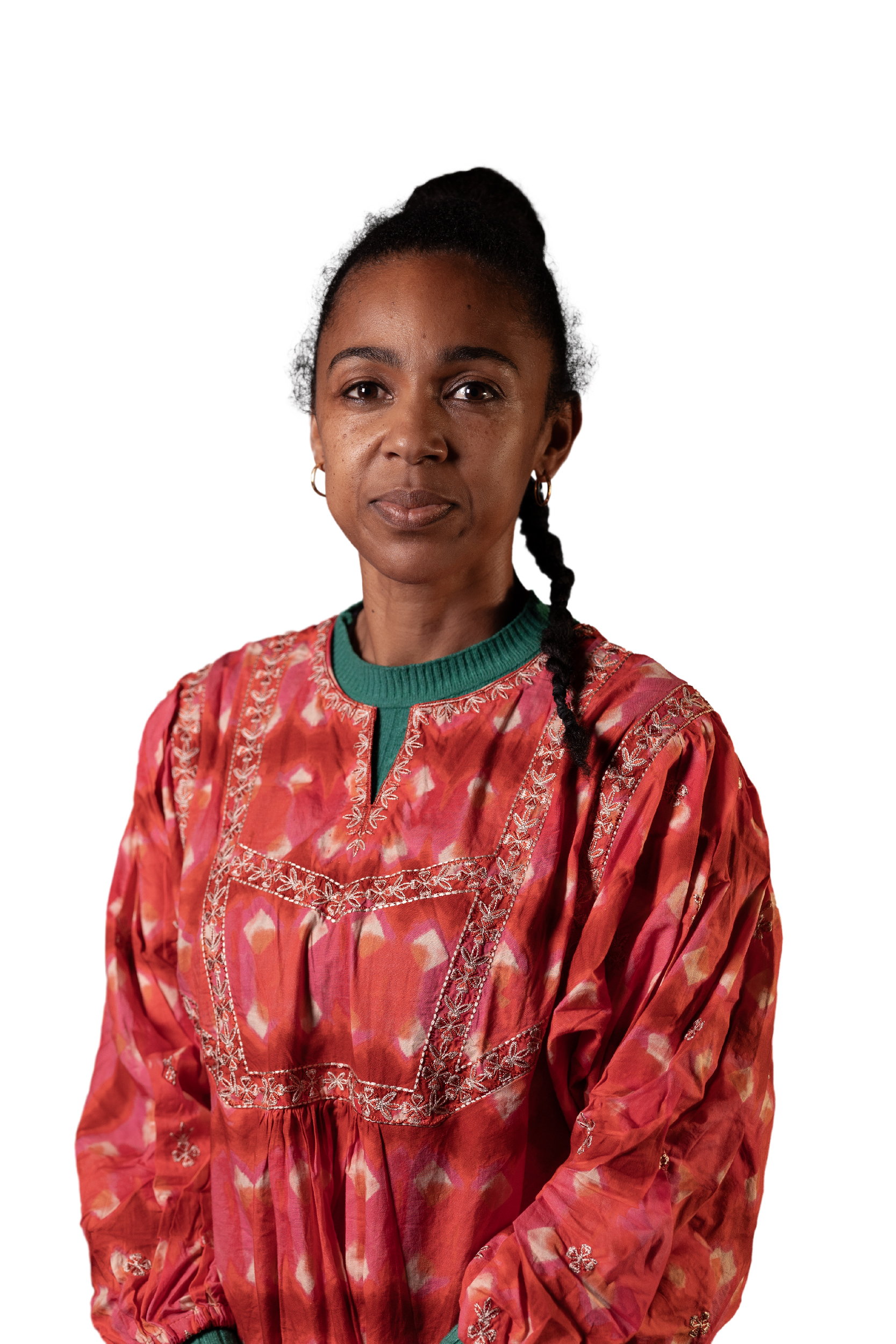
- Anabela Rodrigues in 2024

Member of the European Parliament for Portugal
- In office 26 March 2024 – 15 July 2024
- Preceded by: Marisa Matias

Personal details
- Born: Anabela Lopes Rodrigues; 18 October 1976 (age 48)
- Political party: Left Bloc

Anabela Lopes Rodrigues (born 18 October 1976) is a Portuguese politician who briefly served a member of the European Parliament between March and July 2024. She is a politician in the Left Bloc. She was the first black MEP from Portugal, after replacing Marisa Matias, who joined the Assembly of the Republic.
