= Rans, Penafiel =

Rans
- Civil parish
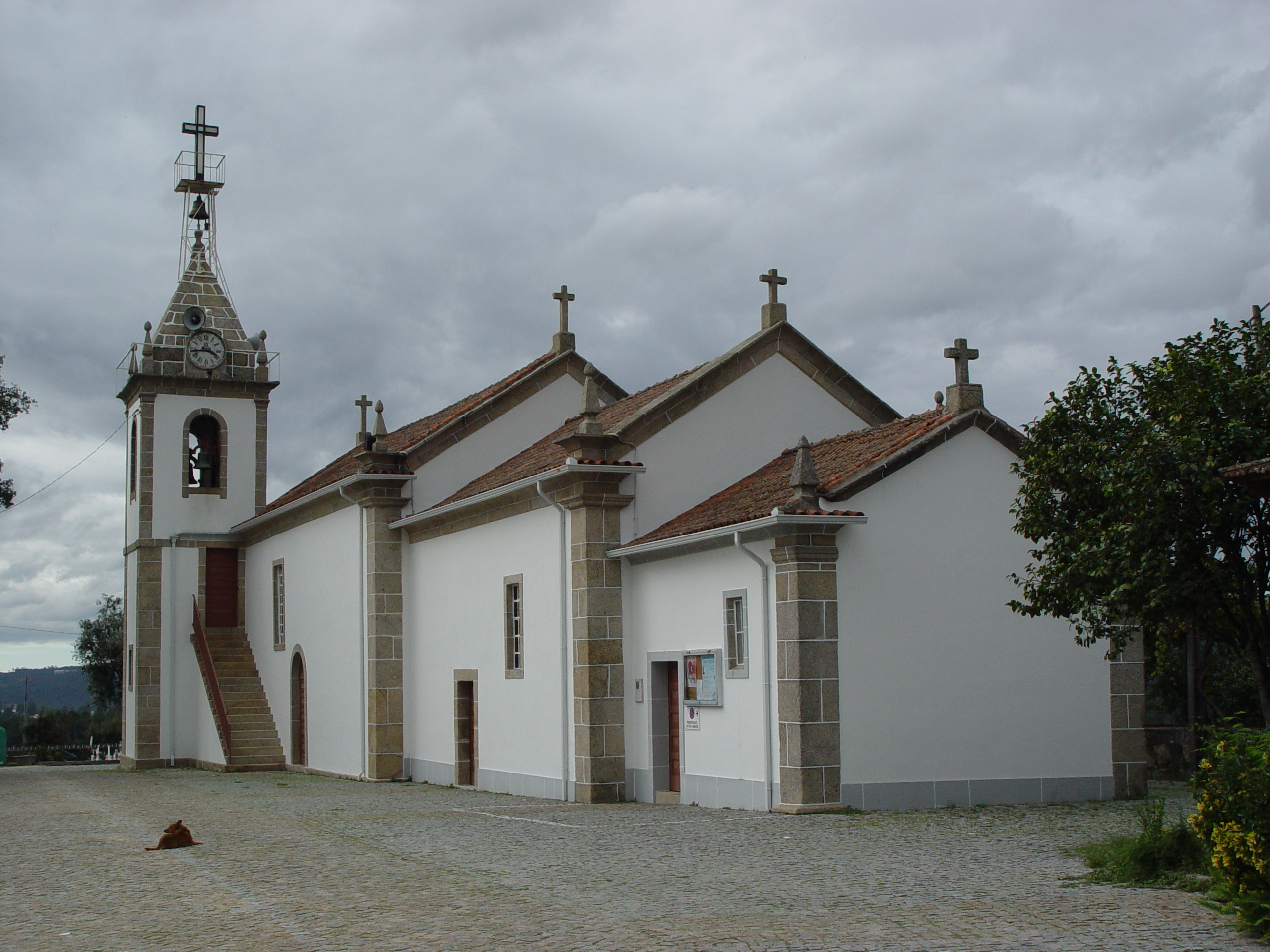
- Parish Church of Rans

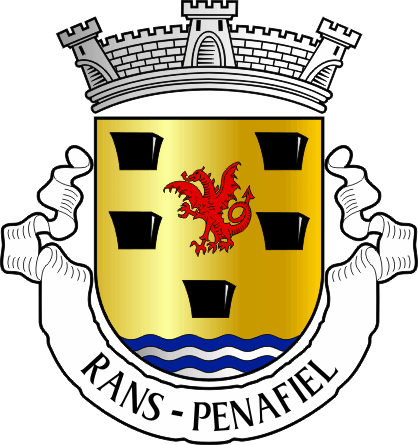
- Coat of arms

- Location in Portugal
- Coordinates: 41°10′07″N 8°18′15″W
- Country: Portugal
- Region: Norte
- Intermunic. comm.: Tâmega e Sousa
- District: Porto
- Municipality: Penafiel

Area
  - Total: 5.11 km^{2} (1.97 sq mi)

Population (2021)
  - Total: 1,804
  - Density: 353/km^{2} (914/sq mi)
- Time zone: UTC+00:00 (WET)
  - Summer (DST): UTC+01:00 (WEST)
- Postal code: 4560
- Patron: Saint Michael

Rans is a village and a civil parish of the municipality of Penafiel, Portugal. The population in 2021 was 1,804, in an area of 5.11 km^{2}.

Vitorino Silva, two times presidential candidate, was the president of the parish from 1994 until 2002.
