= Maria de Belém Roseira =

Portuguese politician

Maria de Belém Roseira GCC
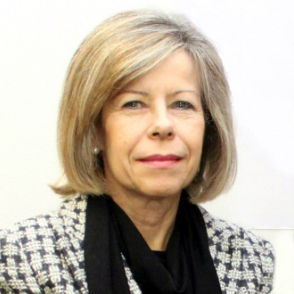

President of the Socialist Party
- In office 9 September 2011 – 29 November 2014
- Secretary-General: António José Seguro
- Preceded by: António de Almeida Santos
- Succeeded by: Carlos César

President of the Parliamentary Group of the Socialist Party
- In office 25 July 2011 – 27 June 2012
- Preceded by: Francisco Assis
- Succeeded by: Carlos Zorrinho

Minister for Equality
- In office 25 October 1999 – 15 September 2000
- Prime Minister: António Guterres
- Preceded by: Office established
- Succeeded by: Office abolished

Minister of Health
- In office 28 October 1995 – 25 October 1999
- Prime Minister: António Guterres
- Preceded by: Paulo Mendo
- Succeeded by: Manuela Arcanjo

Member of the Assembly of the Republic
- In office 22 June 2011 – 22 October 2015
- Constituency: Lisbon
- In office 15 October 2009 – 19 June 2011
- Constituency: Aveiro
- In office 10 March 2005 – 14 October 2009
- Constituency: Lisbon
- In office 5 April 2002 – 9 March 2005
- Constituency: Aveiro
- In office 25 October 1999 – 4 April 2002
- Constituency: Porto

Personal details
- Born: 28 July 1949 (age 77) Porto, Portugal
- Party: Socialist Party
- Spouse: Manuel Pina
- Education: University of Coimbra

Maria de Belém Roseira Martins Coelho Henriques de Pina GCC (born 28 July 1949) is a Portuguese politician who served as Minister of Health from 1995 to 1999, Minister for Equality from 1999 to 2000, and President of the Socialist Party from 2011 to 2014. She is informally known as Maria de Belém.

== Biography ==
She graduated in Law at the University of Coimbra in 1972.

She was Minister of Health (1995–1999) in the first government of António Guterres, and Minister for Equality (1999–2000) early in his second government.

In December 2006, while she was still President of the Parliamentary Health Commission, she was hired as a consultant by Espírito Santo Saúde, a private health provider. She stated that she did not consider there would be any conflict of interest holding both roles simultaneously In 2015, while she was still a member of parliament, she was put forward as a member of the Executive Council of the Board of Governors of Luz Saúde (formerly Espírito Santo Saúde).

=== 2016 presidential elections ===
She was a candidate in the 2016 Portuguese presidential election, but received only 4.26% of the votes, losing to Marcelo Rebelo de Sousa, and not being supported as the official candidate of her party.

Roseira announced her candidacy for the 2016 presidential elections on 17 August 2015 and formalised it on 22 December, at the Constitutional Court, with around 9,200 signatures. Her national campaign chair was Eduardo Marçal Grilo, and Simonetta Luz Afonso and Júlio Machado Vaz were the campaign chairs in Lisbon and Porto, respectively. Belonging to the honour committee of the candidacy Manuel Alegre, Jorge Coelho, José Vera Jardim and Alberto Martins. Bruno Matias was the campaign chair for youth.

She came in 4th place in the elections, with only 4.24% of the votes, a result well below what the initial polls predicted, in which she even disputed the second place with the other candidate supported by members of the Socialist Party, António Sampaio da Nóvoa. The result of less than 5% meant that she was not entitled to a state subsidy to cover the expenses of the electoral campaign.

Party political offices
Preceded by António de Almeida Santos	President of the Socialist Party; 2011–2014	Succeeded by Carlos César
