= Manuel Carvalho da Silva =

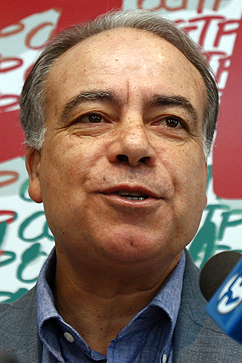
- Carvalho da Silva in 2007

Secretary-General of the General Confederation of the Portuguese Workers
- In office 1 June 1986 – 28 January 2012
- Preceded by: Armando Teixeira da Silva
- Succeeded by: Arménio Carlos

Personal details
- Born: Manuel Carvalho da Silva; 2 November 1948 (age 77) Viatodos, Barcelos, Braga District, Portugal
- Party: Portuguese Communist Party (until 2013)
- Education: ISCTE – University Institute of Lisbon
- Occupation: Author • Professor • Social researcher

Manuel Carvalho da Silva (born 2 November 1948) is a Portuguese sociologist, research professor and former Secretary-General of the General Confederation of the Portuguese Workers (CGTP–IN).

Carvalho da Silva graduated from the Industrial Electrician School Carlos Amarante in Braga and is a doctorate in Sociology from the ISCTE – University Institute of Lisbon.

He was elected as coordinator of the CGTP–IN (General Confederation of Portuguese Workers - National Inter) in June 1986 and in December 1999 he was attained the office of Secretary-General. On 28 January 2012, he was succeeded by Arménio Carlos.

He has had several published works and books on syndicalism and economy.

His name was referred several times as potential candidate to Secretary-General of the Portuguese Communist Party, but he always stated he was not interested in the office. According to a press newspaper, he severed his ties with the party shortly after leaving the CGTP–IN leadership, but this allegation was never confirmed by any of the parts involved.
