= António Sampaio da Nóvoa =

Portuguese politician

His Magnificence António Sampaio da Nóvoa GCIP ComRB
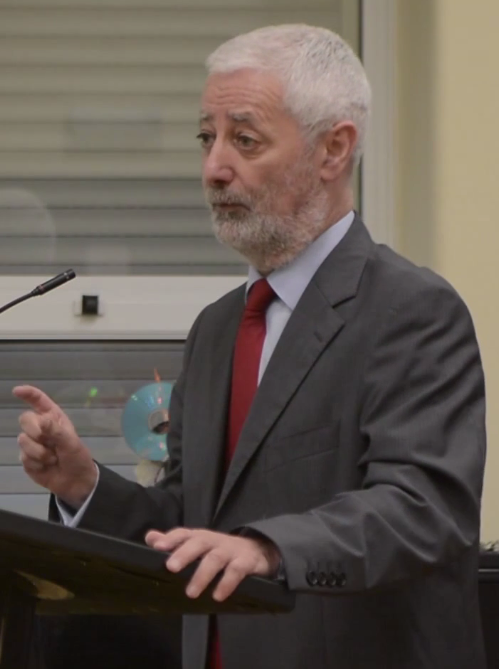
- Sampaio da Nóvoa in 2015

Member of the Council of State
- In office 20 April 2022 – 19 June 2024
- Appointed by: Assembly of the Republic
- President: Marcelo Rebelo de Sousa

Rector of the University of Lisbon
- In office 23 May 2006 – 25 July 2013
- Preceded by: José Barata-Moura
- Succeeded by: António Cruz Serra

Honorary Rector of the University of Lisbon
- Incumbent
- Assumed office 27 February 2014
- Preceded by: Office established

Personal details
- Born: António Manuel Seixas Sampaio da Nóvoa; 12 December 1954 (age 71) Valença, Portugal
- Party: Independent
- Other political affiliations: LUAR (formerly)
- Education: University of Geneva; Paris-Sorbonne University
- Occupation: Professor • Academic

António Manuel Seixas Sampaio da Nóvoa GCIP ComRB (born 12 December 1954) is a Portuguese professor at the Faculty of Psychology and Education Sciences of the University of Lisbon, and former Rector of the same university. He was defeated as a candidate in the January 2016 Portuguese presidential election.

== Distinctions ==
=== Orders ===
- Grand Cross of the Order of Public Instruction, Portugal (4 October 2005)
- Commander of the Order of Rio Branco, Brazil (21 May 1999)
