= Henrique Neto =

Portuguese entrepreneur, industrialist (Born 1936)

Henrique Neto GOIH GOMAIC

Member of the Assembly of the Republic Election: 1995
- In office 11 December 1995 – 23 October 1999
- Constituency: Leiria

Personal details
- Born: Henrique José de Sousa Neto; 27 April 1936 (age 89) Lisbon, Portugal
- Party: Independent
- Other political affiliations: Socialist Party (1993-2017); Portuguese Communist Party (1968-1975)
- Children: 3 sons
- Profession: Industrialist

Henrique José de Sousa Neto (born 27 April 1936, in Lisbon) is a Portuguese entrepreneur, industrialist and former member of the Portuguese parliament for the Socialist Party. He founded the company Iberomoldes in 1975 and became one of the most noted businesspersons in the Portuguese engineering-related industry. Henrique Neto was the first candidate to step up for the 2016 Portuguese presidential election.

== Early life ==
Born in Lisbon on April 27, 1936, Neto studied at first in the Lisbon Industrial School and then at the Commercial School of Marinha Grande, a town from where his family had come from to Lisbon and where he moved at age 14. He began working as a metal worker apprentice in a mold factory, where he became director and later owner.

== Career ==
In 1975 he founded Iberomoldes, which would become in the following years the holding company of a group of twelve industrial companies and more than 1000 employees. It was from this group that SET was born, an engineering company especialized in innovative products development and IBEROLEFF in Pombal for the production and export of components for automotive and industrial companies. He sold his position in 2009 to a co-founder.

Alongside its professional life in industry he also started very young in Portuguese politics and activism, influenced by his family environment which was not aligned with the Estado Novo regime. He was affiliated with the MUD youth (an anti-regime organization), and participated in anti-regime conferences, illegally reproduced documents at home and worked actively in the presidential campaign of General Humberto Delgado. In 1969 he was even arrested for a while due to these anti-regime activities.

He joined the Portuguese Communist Party in 1968 but left it in 1975, after the Carnation Revolution, in disagreement with the positions that were being taken, devoting himself thereafter only to business life. In 1993 Neto joined the Socialist Party at the invitation of Jorge Sampaio. He was elected to the Assembly of the Republic in 1995, and worked as a deputy until the end of his term in 1999.

Henrique Neto was a candidate in the 2016 Portuguese presidential election, obtaining 0,84% of the vote.

Henrique Neto became a fierce critic of the Socialist Party and of its leader (and Prime Minister of Portugal) António Costa in the recent years; he rescinded his party membership in July 2017. He supported Rui Rio and the Social Democratic Party in the 2022 parliamentary elections and appeared in a rally in Leiria.
