= Paulo de Morais =

Portuguese professor, politician (born 1963)

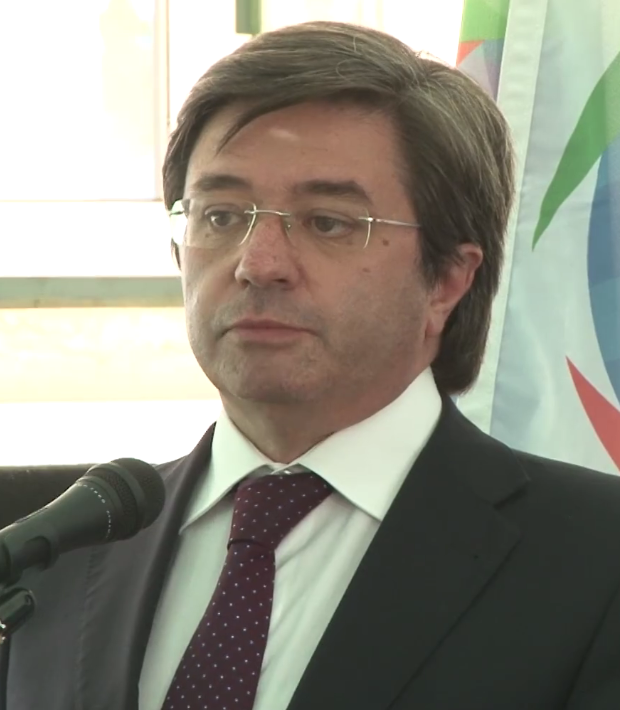

Deputy Mayor of Porto
- In office 2002–2005

Personal details
- Born: Paulo Alexandre Baptista Teixeira de Morais; 22 December 1963 (age 62) Viana do Castelo, Portugal
- Party: Social Democratic Party (1980–2013); Independent (2013–present)
- Education: University of Porto
- Profession: Professor

Paulo Alexandre Baptista Teixeira de Morais (born 22 December 1963, in Viana do Castelo) is a Portuguese professor and politician. He is the vice-president of the national chapter of the NGO Transparency International. Former deputy mayor of Porto and a public voice against corruption in Portuguese politics, he ran to the presidential elections of 2016. Paulo de Morais, whose campaign focused on the fight against corruption, obtained more than 100,000 votes.
