= Edgar Silva =

Portuguese politician (born 1962)

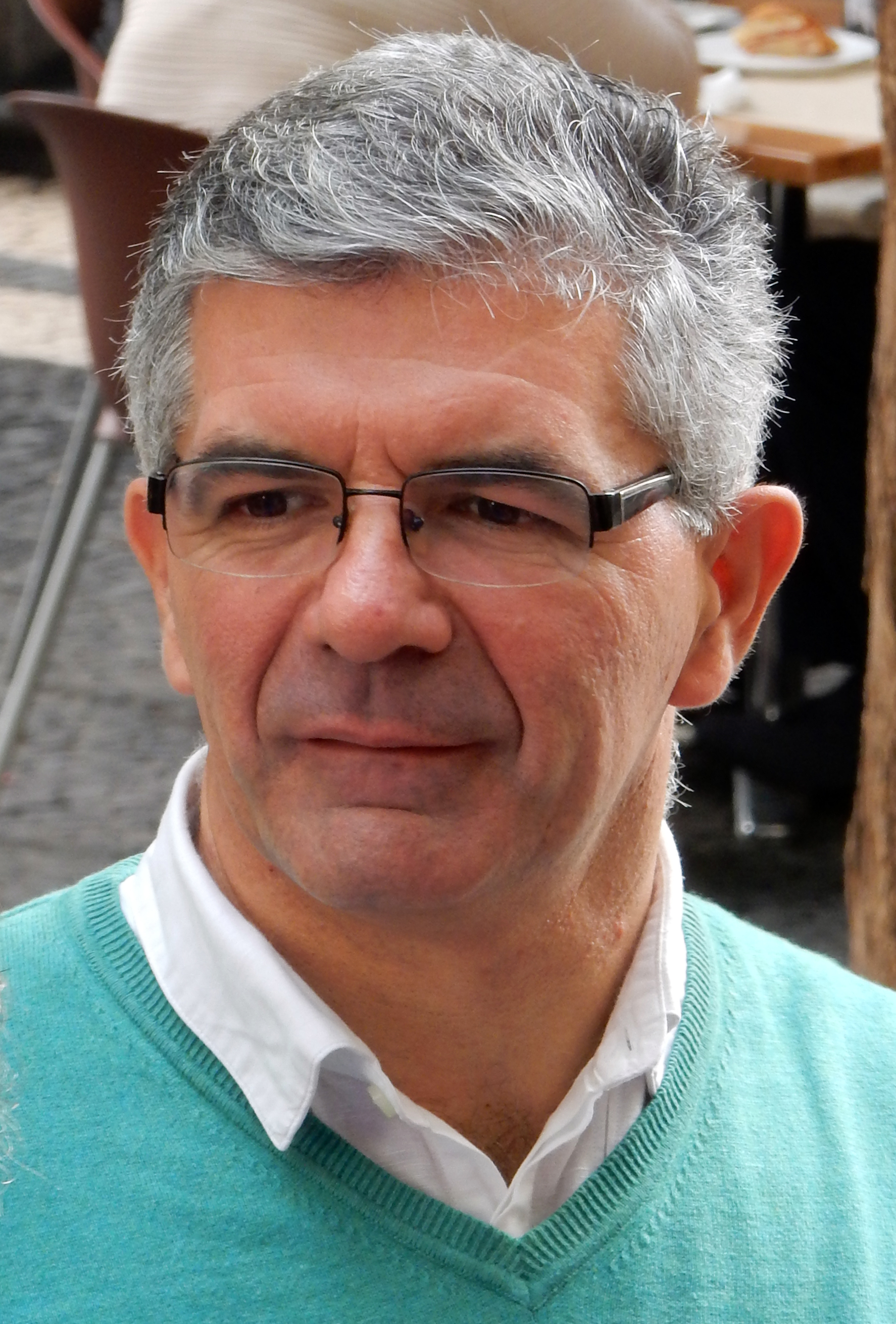
- Edgar Silva in 2016

Member of the Legislative Assembly of Madeira
- In office 8 November 1996 – 26 May 2024

Personal details
- Born: Edgar Freitas Gomes da Silva; 25 September 1962 (age 64) Funchal, Madeira, Portugal
- Party: Portuguese Communist Party (1997–present)
- Education: Catholic University of Portugal
- Website: www.edgarsilva2016.pt

Edgar Freitas Gomes da Silva (born 25 September 1962) is a Portuguese politician and former Catholic priest. He is known for having been a bitter dissident from the Portuguese Catholic hierarchy.

Edgar Silva is a licenciate in Theology and holds a master's degree in Systematic Theology from the Catholic University of Portugal. He has been a militant of the Portuguese Communist Party since 1997, and also a member of its Central Committee since 10 December 2000.

He was a candidate to the 2016 presidential election.

== Works ==
Among his published books, there can be found works on social and human development issues such as:

- Os instrangeiros na Madeira. Funchal: Edgar Silva, 2005. ISBN 972-8246-85-4.
- Madeira, tempo perdido. Funchal: Edgar Silva, 2007. ISBN 978-972-8246-98-3.
- Os bichos da Corte do Ogre usam máscaras de riso. 2010.
- Silva, Edgar; Vilarigues, Sofia (2011). Pontes de Mudança, sociedades sustentáveis e solidárias. Funchal: Antagonista. ISBN 978-989-83-3611-8.
