= Opinion polling for the 2011 Portuguese presidential election =

In the run up to the 2011 Portuguese presidential election, various organisations carried out opinion polling to gauge voting intention in Portugal. Results of such polls are displayed in this article.

Poll results are listed in the table below in reverse chronological order, showing the most recent first. The highest percentage figure in each polling survey is displayed in bold, and the background shaded in the leading candidate colour. In the instance that there is a tie, then no figure is shaded but both are displayed in bold. Poll results use the date the survey's fieldwork was done, as opposed to the date of publication.

== Candidates vote ==
=== First round ===
==== Graphical summary ====
View source data.

==== Polling ====
Exit poll

Polling firm	Fieldwork date	Sample size	Cavaco Silva	Manuel Alegre	Fernando Nobre	Defensor Moura	Francisco Lopes	José Manuel Coelho	Oth/ Und	Lead
Polling firm	Fieldwork date	Sample size	PSD	PS	Ind.	Ind.	CDU	PND	Oth/ Und	Lead
**Election results**	23 Jan 2011	46.5	53.0	19.7	14.1	1.6	7.1	4.5	—	**33.3**
UCP–CESOP	23 Jan 2011	24,213	52–58	18–21	13.5–16.5	1–2	5–8	2–4	—	35.5
Eurosondagem	23 Jan 2011	34,452	51.6–56.0	17.1–20.9	13.1–16.3	1.1–2.1	6.3–7.5	3.3–4.5	—	34.8
Intercampus	23 Jan 2011	24,740	51.4–55.4	17.2–21.2	12.4–16.4	0.7–2.7	5.8–8.8	3.1–5.1	—	34.2
Sol (average)	21 Jan 2011	—N/a	58	22	11	2	5	2	—	36
Intercampus	16–19 Jan 2011	1,004	54.6	22.8	9.1	2.6	8.2	2.7	—	31.8
UCP–CESOP	15–18 Jan 2011	4,321	59	22	10	1	6	2	—	37
Eurosondagem	13–18 Jan 2011	2,063	56.3	25.0	10.1	2.0	5.2	1.4	—	31.3
Marktest	14–16 Jan 2011	802	61.5	15.0	12.7	1.2	3.3	2.1	4.2	46.5
Aximage	10–14 Jan 2011	1,000	54.7	25.6	10.7	1.8	6.3	0.9	—	29.1
Aximage	3–6 Jan 2011	600	57.1	20.8	8.7	3.1	2.0	0.5	7.8	36.3
Intercampus	3–6 Jan 2011	1,002	60.1	25.3	4.2	2.5	6.3	1.6	—	34.8
Eurosondagem	15–20 Dec 2010	2,052	60.0	30.0	4.8	0.7	4.5	—	—	30.0
Intercampus	10–15 Dec 2010	607	64.3	20.7	5.5	1.0	4.5	—	—	43.6
Eurosondagem	18–23 Nov 2010	2,069	57.0	32.0	5.2	1.0	4.8	—	—	25.0
Marktest	16–19 Nov 2010	804	78.3	15.0	4.0	0.0	0.7	—	—	63.3
Intercampus	12–17 Nov 2010	609	61.5	26.1	4.5	0.5	3.7	—	3.7	35.4
UCP–CESOP	23–25 Oct 2010	1,140	63	20	7	1	3	—	—	43
Marktest	19–24 Oct 2010	807	71.3	20.2	5.0	0.9	1.1	—	—	51.1
Intercampus	4–6 Oct 2010	609	55.5	30.7	4.9	1.2	5.6	—	—	24.8
Aximage	1–4 Oct 2010	600	55.1	35.7	7.1	0.2	1.9	—	—	19.4
Eurosondagem	15–21 Sep 2010	2,062	54.9	33.0	6.2	1.1	4.8	—	—	21.9
Marktest	14–17 Sep 2010	804	70.6	21.9	4.4	0.2	1.0	—	1.9	49.0
Aximage	6–9 Sep 2010	600	58.1	32.1	5.4	0.0	4.4	—	—	26.0
Marktest	20–26 Jul 2010	802	67.1	19.6	10.0	0.7	—	—	—	47.5
Intercampus	16–19 Jul 2010	603	59.4	26.8	9.1	2.9	—	—	—	32.6
Euroexpansão	8–11 Jul 2010	1,504	51.1	14.7	4.1	—	—	—	22.1	36.4
Aximage	1–4 Jul 2010	600	55.3	26.9	11.6	—	—	—	6.2	28.4
UCP–CESOP	19–21 Jun 2010	1,179	50	19	7	—	—	—	25	31
Aximage	1–7 Jun 2010	600	53.4	28.1	8.6	—	—	—	9.9	25.3
UCP–CESOP	6–9 Mar 2010	600	57	19	8	—	—	—	16	38
Aximage	5–9 Mar 2010	600	56.0	21.6	13.8	—	—	—	8.6	34.4
Eurosondagem	4–9 Mar 2010	1,019	36.9	25.0	9.6	—	(5.0)	—	23.5	11.9
Aximage	6–11 Jan 2010	600	60.3	39.7	—	—	—	—	—	20.6

== Leadership polls ==
=== Approval ratings ===
The table below lists the evolution of public opinion on the president's performance in office

Polling firm	Fieldwork date	Sample size	Aníbal Cavaco Silva			
Polling firm	Fieldwork date	Sample size	Approve	Disapprove	No opinion	Lead
Eurosondagem	5–11 Jan 2011	1,010	**53.1**	29.7	17.2	23.4
Aximage	3–6 Jan 2011	600	**56.0**	28.1	15.9	27.9
Aximage	5–7 Dec 2010	600	**62.0**	21.1	16.9	40.9
Eurosondagem	2–7 Dec 2010	1,020	**56.2**	25.4	18.4	30.8
Marktest	16–19 Nov 2010	807	**58.2**	21.7	20.1	36.5
Eurosondagem	4–9 Nov 2010	1,025	**54.1**	25.6	20.3	28.5
UCP–CESOP	23–25 Oct 2010	1,140	**79**	21	—N/a	58
Marktest	19–24 Oct 2010	807	**52.9**	27.3	19.8	25.6
Eurosondagem	6–12 Oct 2010	1,021	**52.9**	26.3	20.8	26.6
Aximage	1–4 Oct 2010	600	**58.2**	22.2	19.6	36.0
Marktest	14–17 Sep 2010	804	**53.8**	24.0	22.2	29.8
Aximage	6–9 Sep 2010	600	**55.5**	14.5	30.0	41.0
Eurosondagem	1–7 Sep 2010	1,035	**56.0**	25.3	18.7	30.7
Eurosondagem	28 Jul–2 Aug 2010	1,031	**55.0**	25.0	20.0	30.0
Marktest	20–26 Jul 2010	802	**56.4**	23.4	20.2	33.0
Eurosondagem	1–6 Jul 2010	1,035	**52.0**	25.3	22.7	26.7
Aximage	1–4 Jul 2010	600	**56.6**	28.2	15.2	28.4
UCP–CESOP	19–21 Jun 2010	1,179	**80**	20	—N/a	60
Marktest	15–20 Jun 2010	804	**55.1**	22.3	22.6	32.8
Eurosondagem	2–8 Jun 2010	1,025	**50.8**	25.6	23.6	25.2
Marktest	18–20 May 2010	804	**60.7**	20.1	19.2	40.6
Eurosondagem	13–18 May 2010	1,024	**49.8**	26.3	23.9	23.5
Aximage	4–7 May 2010	600	**59.1**	25.1	15.8	34.0
Marktest	20–25 Apr 2010	800	**64.0**	16.0	20.0	48.0
Eurosondagem	8–13 Apr 2010	1,020	**47.1**	27.5	25.4	19.6
Aximage	5–8 Apr 2010	600	**59.6**	16.2	24.2	43.4
Marktest	16–21 Mar 2010	808	**63.5**	17.9	18.6	45.6
UCP–CESOP	6–9 Mar 2010	1,148	**87**	13	—N/a	74
Aximage	5–9 Mar 2010	600	**60.6**	16.9	22.5	43.7
Eurosondagem	4–9 Mar 2010	1,019	**43.4**	29.0	27.6	14.4
Marktest	16–21 Feb 2010	804	**55.5**	23.2	21.3	32.3
Eurosondagem	4–9 Feb 2010	1,010	**43.1**	30.2	26.7	12.9
Aximage	2–5 Feb 2010	600	**50.0**	23.9	26.1	26.1
Marktest	19–23 Jan 2010	803	**60.0**	21.0	19.0	39.0
Eurosondagem	7–12 Jan 2010	1,010	**40.6**	30.7	28.7	9.9
Aximage	6–11 Jan 2010	600	**54.8**	23.7	21.5	31.1
Aximage	7–10 Dec 2009	600	**48.1**	27.6	24.3	20.5
Eurosondagem	25 Nov–1 Dec 2009	1,031	**36.9**	31.1	32.0	5.8
Marktest	17–19 Nov 2009	808	**58.9**	21.0	20.1	37.9
Aximage	3–6 Nov 2009	600	**46.2**	27.1	26.7	19.1
Eurosondagem	29 Oct–3 Nov 2009	1,030	**35.8**	32.3	31.9	3.5
Marktest	20–24 Oct 2009	806	**58.7**	20.2	21.1	38.5
Aximage	12–16 Oct 2009	600	35.5	**42.4**	22.1	6.9
Marktest	18–21 Sep 2009	806	**67.6**	15.2	17.2	52.4
Marktest	4–7 Sep 2009	811	**67.9**	15.1	17.0	52.8
Eurosondagem	25–30 Jan 2007	1,011	**70.0**	?	?	?
Eurosondagem	29 Nov–5 Dec 2006	?	**70.1**	?	?	?
