= Opinion polling on the Aníbal Cavaco Silva presidency =

Opinion polling on the presidency of Aníbal Cavaco Silva was regularly conducted by Portuguese pollsters during his term in office between March 2006 and March 2016.

Poll results are listed in the table below in reverse chronological order, showing the most recent first. The highest percentage figure in each polling survey is displayed in bold, and the background shaded in the leading opinion colour. In the instance that there is a tie, then no figure is shaded but both are displayed in bold. The lead column on the right shows the percentage-point difference between the two options, approval and disapproval. Poll results use the date the survey's fieldwork was done, as opposed to the date of publication.

== Polling ==
=== Second Term (2011–2016) ===
The table below lists the evolution of public opinion on the President's performance in office during his second term, starting on 9 March 2011, following his re-election victory on the 2011 presidential election, and ending on 9 March 2016.

Polling firm	Fieldwork date	Sample size	Aníbal Cavaco Silva			
Polling firm	Fieldwork date	Sample size	Approve	Disapprove	No opinion	Lead
Eurosondagem	3–9 Mar 2016	1,005	26.7	**40.8**	32.5	14.1
Eurosondagem	4–10 Feb 2016	1,010	26.8	**40.0**	33.2	13.2
Aximage	30–31 Jan 2016	606	24.8	**60.9**	14.3	36.1
Eurosondagem	1–6 Jan 2016	1,016	26.5	**39.4**	34.1	12.9
Aximage	2–5 Jan 2016	602	26.5	**57.2**	16.3	30.7
Eurosondagem	3–9 Dec 2015	1,015	26.3	**36.2**	37.5	9.9
UCP–CESOP	5–6 Dec 2015	1,183	48	**52**	—N/a	4
Aximage	28 Nov–2 Dec 2015	605	27.0	**63.4**	9.6	36.4
Eurosondagem	29 Oct–3 Nov 2015	1,036	29.9	**35.6**	34.5	5.7
Aximage	4–7 Sep 2015	602	24.1	**59.3**	16.6	35.2
Eurosondagem	27 Aug–2 Sep 2015	1,040	30.9	**32.0**	37.1	1.1
Eurosondagem	29 Jul–4 Aug 2015	1,030	31.6	**33.8**	34.6	2.2
Aximage	12–16 Jul 2015	607	25.6	**61.5**	12.9	35.9
Eurosondagem	2–7 Jul 2015	1,025	31.3	**34.4**	34.3	3.1
UCP–CESOP	13–16 Jun 2015	1,048	46	**54**	—N/a	8
Eurosondagem	4–9 Jun 2015	1,030	30.1	**35.6**	34.3	5.5
Aximage	31 May–4 Jun 2015	598	24.0	**63.8**	12.2	39.8
Eurosondagem	7–12 May 2015	1,021	29.4	**35.9**	34.7	6.5
Aximage	7–10 May 2015	605	23.0	**65.3**	11.7	42.3
Eurosondagem	9–15 Apr 2015	1,025	28.5	**36.0**	34.5	7.5
Aximage	4–8 Apr 2015	602	20.1	**67.4**	12.5	47.3
Eurosondagem	5–10 Mar 2015	1,005	29.9	**36.1**	34.0	6.2
Aximage	3–6 Mar 2015	600	23.1	**64.4**	12.5	41.3
Eurosondagem	5–11 Feb 2015	1,015	31.6	**32.8**	35.6	1.2
Aximage	4–8 Feb 2015	608	25.5	**62.1**	12.4	36.6
Eurosondagem	8–14 Jan 2015	1,010	32.2	**33.0**	34.8	0.8
Aximage	9–12 Jan 2015	601	28.2	**59.8**	12.0	31.6
Eurosondagem	4–10 Dec 2014	1,036	**33.6**	31.9	34.5	1.7
Aximage	1–4 Dec 2014	607	28.0	**61.7**	10.3	33.7
Eurosondagem	6–11 Nov 2014	1,022	**34.1**	31.4	34.5	2.7
Aximage	7–10 Nov 2014	603	29.6	**61.1**	9.3	31.5
UCP–CESOP	11–13 Oct 2014	1,064	46	**54**	—N/a	8
Eurosondagem	2–7 Oct 2014	1,021	**35.6**	30.4	34.0	5.2
Aximage	1–4 Oct 2014	609	33.3	**57.5**	9.2	24.2
Eurosondagem	4–9 Sep 2014	1,011	**36.5**	29.7	33.8	6.8
Aximage	31 Aug–3 Sep 2014	602	32.1	**51.9**	16.0	19.8
Eurosondagem	31 Jul–6 Aug 2014	1,033	**35.7**	29.0	35.3	6.7
Eurosondagem	3–9 Jul 2014	1,014	**38.8**	29.6	31.6	9.2
Aximage	4–7 Jul 2014	593	30.5	**54.8**	14.7	24.3
Eurosondagem	2–5 Jun 2014	1,025	**36.0**	31.3	32.7	4.7
Aximage	1–4 Jun 2014	608	**28.0**	7.7	64.3	20.3
Eurosondagem	1–7 May 2014	1,005	**38.1**	30.1	31.8	8.0
Aximage	2–5 May 2014	605	31.3	**56.5**	12.2	25.2
UCP–CESOP	12–14 Apr 2014	1,117	48	**52**	—N/a	4
Aximage	9–12 Apr 2014	613	33.3	**55.8**	10.9	22.5
Eurosondagem	3–9 Apr 2014	1,011	**39.6**	29.7	30.7	9.9
Eurosondagem	6–12 Mar 2014	1,021	**41.5**	29.4	29.1	12.1
Aximage	8–11 Mar 2014	587	34.6	**53.6**	11.8	19.0
Aximage	9–12 Feb 2014	604	31.6	**58.9**	9.5	27.3
Eurosondagem	6–12 Feb 2014	1,025	**40.0**	31.3	28.7	8.7
Eurosondagem	9–15 Jan 2014	1,010	**38.9**	31.8	29.3	7.1
Aximage	7–10 Jan 2014	601	31.6	**56.9**	11.5	25.3
Eurosondagem	5–10 Dec 2013	1,035	**38.0**	32.4	29.6	5.6
Aximage	6–9 Dec 2013	609	32.6	**54.2**	13.2	21.6
Marktest	19–21 Nov 2013	803	18.0	**65.4**	16.6	47.4
Aximage	6–9 Nov 2013	602	23.8	**65.7**	10.5	41.9
Eurosondagem	30 Oct–5 Nov 2013	1,005	**36.7**	33.1	30.2	3.6
Marktest	22–25 Oct 2013	803	19.3	**61.0**	19.7	41.7
Eurosondagem	2–8 Oct 2013	1,010	**36.1**	34.5	29.4	1.6
Marktest	17–19 Sep 2013	801	21.3	**60.3**	18.4	39.0
Eurosondagem	5–11 Sep 2013	1,038	33.5	**34.2**	32.3	0.7
Aximage	1–3 Sep 2013	609	25.9	**61.9**	12.2	36.0
Eurosondagem	25–31 Jul 2013	1,020	33.0	**35.8**	31.2	2.8
UCP–CESOP	27–29 Jul 2013	1,096	46	**54**	—N/a	8
Marktest	16–18 Jul 2013	804	18.8	**62.2**	19.0	43.4
Aximage	8–11 Jul 2013	603	23.9	**64.8**	11.3	40.9
Eurosondagem	5–10 Jul 2013	1,007	29.8	**35.3**	34.9	5.5
Aximage	4–7 Jun 2013	599	18.4	**67.0**	14.6	48.6
Eurosondagem	30 May–4 Jun 2013	1,028	31.2	**33.9**	34.9	2.7
Marktest	27–30 May 2013	802	18.3	**65.8**	15.9	47.5
Aximage	7–10 May 2013	604	21.0	**63.9**	15.1	42.9
Eurosondagem	2–8 May 2013	1,009	31.8	**33.0**	35.2	1.2
Eurosondagem	5–10 Apr 2013	1,025	**32.9**	31.7	35.4	1.2
UCP–CESOP	9–11 Mar 2013	949	48	**52**	—N/a	4
Eurosondagem	28 Feb–5 Mar 2013	1,022	**36.2**	32.6	31.2	3.6
Aximage	5–8 Feb 2013	602	24.2	**61.3**	14.5	37.1
Eurosondagem	30 Jan–5 Feb 2013	1,011	**39.6**	30.8	29.6	8.8
Marktest	15–21 Jan 2013	803	20.3	**62.8**	16.9	42.5
Aximage	6–9 Jan 2013	603	24.2	**62.3**	13.5	38.1
Eurosondagem	3–8 Jan 2013	1,010	**37.6**	31.8	30.6	5.8
Eurosondagem	5–11 Dec 2012	1,034	**36.9**	33.0	30.1	3.9
Aximage	4–7 Dec 2012	609	19.2	**63.8**	17.0	44.6
Eurosondagem	7–13 Nov 2012	1,033	**36.8**	32.6	30.6	4.2
Aximage	30 Oct–6 Nov 2012	602	18.0	**62.2**	19.8	44.2
Eurosondagem	4–9 Oct 2012	1,021	**34.1**	31.3	34.6	2.8
Aximage	1–4 Oct 2012	600	20.2	**57.8**	22.0	37.6
Marktest	17–20 Sep 2012	805	16.5	**68.2**	15.3	51.7
UCP–CESOP	15–17 Sep 2012	1,132	49	**51**	—N/a	2
Eurosondagem	10–13 Sep 2012	1,037	**35.1**	29.9	35.0	5.2
Aximage	3–6 Sep 2012	600	27.0	**50.2**	22.8	23.2
Eurosondagem	9–14 Aug 2012	1,011	**34.4**	31.8	33.8	2.6
Marktest	17–20 Jul 2012	803	23.4	**60.9**	15.7	37.5
Eurosondagem	5–10 Jul 2012	1,036	**33.8**	32.8	33.4	1.0
Marktest	19–22 Jun 2012	800	28.6	**56.4**	15.0	27.8
Eurosondagem	7–12 Jun 2012	1,022	**34.4**	34.1	31.5	0.3
Aximage	4–6 Jun 2012	600	24.4	**55.1**	20.5	30.7
UCP–CESOP	26–28 May 2012	1,366	**56**	44	—N/a	12
Marktest	22–24 May 2012	807	28.4	**53.8**	17.8	25.4
Eurosondagem	10–15 May 2012	1,011	**34.9**	33.2	31.9	1.7
Aximage	2–5 May 2012	600	23.1	**57.5**	19.4	34.4
Marktest	17–21 Apr 2012	810	21.9	**62.3**	15.8	40.4
Eurosondagem	11–17 Apr 2012	1,036	**37.1**	32.4	30.5	4.7
Aximage	3–5 Apr 2012	600	20.2	**60.7**	18.8	40.5
Eurosondagem	8–13 Mar 2012	1,021	**39.2**	33.2	27.6	6.0
Aximage	5–7 Mar 2012	600	21.5	**59.3**	19.2	37.8
Marktest	14–22 Feb 2012	800	23.6	**61.1**	15.3	37.5
Eurosondagem	2–7 Feb 2012	1,010	**43.8**	31.8	24.4	12.0
Aximage	1–4 Feb 2012	600	21.9	**57.1**	21.0	35.2
Marktest	17–22 Jan 2012	800	31.9	**51.2**	16.9	19.3
Eurosondagem	5–10 Jan 2012	1,064	**47.0**	25.3	27.7	21.7
Aximage	3–6 Jan 2012	600	**38.3**	36.5	25.2	1.8
Eurosondagem	7–13 Dec 2011	1,033	**50.8**	24.4	24.8	26.4
Aximage	5–8 Dec 2011	600	33.3	**37.9**	28.8	4.6
Marktest	15–19 Nov 2011	804	**41.9**	35.3	22.8	6.6
Eurosondagem	10–15 Nov 2011	1,025	**52.3**	23.0	24.7	29.3
Aximage	7–10 Nov 2011	600	34.5	**36.2**	29.3	1.7
Eurosondagem	20–25 Oct 2011	1,032	**51.9**	24.1	24.0	27.8
Marktest	18–22 Oct 2011	809	34.2	**45.2**	20.6	11.0
Aximage	3–5 Oct 2011	600	**37.8**	32.8	29.4	5.0
Eurosondagem	22–27 Sep 2011	1,036	**50.7**	26.0	23.3	24.7
Marktest	20–23 Sep 2011	804	**39.9**	37.1	23.0	2.8
UCP–CESOP	10–11 Sep 2011	1,457	**72**	28	—N/a	44
Aximage	7–10 Sep 2011	600	**37.6**	28.1	34.3	9.5
Eurosondagem	26–30 Aug 2011	1,025	**54.1**	24.4	21.5	29.7
Eurosondagem	14–19 Jul 2011	1,022	**56.8**	25.0	18.2	31.8
Aximage	5–8 Jul 2011	600	**53.0**	21.2	25.8	31.8
Eurosondagem	26–28 Jun 2011	1,010	**59.4**	26.0	14.6	33.4
Marktest	28–31 May 2011	1,208	**44.7**	36.7	18.6	8.0
UCP–CESOP	21–22 May 2011	1,490	**73**	27	—N/a	46
Marktest	9–10 May 2011	805	**47.5**	36.0	16.5	11.5
Aximage	29 Apr–2 May 2011	600	**38.1**	37.4	24.5	0.7
UCP–CESOP	30 Apr–1 May 2011	1,370	**75**	25	—N/a	50
Marktest	15–17 Apr 2011	805	35.3	**46.6**	18.1	11.3
UCP–CESOP	2–3 Apr 2011	1,288	**51**	37	12	14
Aximage	28–30 Mar 2011	600	**42.3**	34.6	23.1	7.7
Eurosondagem	27–30 Mar 2011	1,021	**51.4**	32.6	16.0	18.8
Marktest	18–23 Mar 2011	805	**47.0**	33.6	19.4	13.4
Aximage	3–7 Mar 2011	600	**50.3**	23.7	26.0	26.6
Eurosondagem	23–28 Feb 2011	1,021	**54.1**	32.6	13.3	21.5
Marktest	17–23 Feb 2011	797	**49.4**	29.4	21.2	20.0
Aximage	1–3 Feb 2011	600	**52.1**	28.1	19.8	24.0
Eurosondagem	3–8 Feb 2011	1,025	**52.5**	32.0	15.5	20.5

=== First Term (2006–2011) ===
The table below lists the evolution of public opinion on the President's performance in office during his first term, starting on 9 March 2006, following his victory in the 2006 presidential election, and ending on 9 March 2011.

Polling firm	Fieldwork date	Sample size	Aníbal Cavaco Silva			
Polling firm	Fieldwork date	Sample size	Approve	Disapprove	No opinion	Lead
Eurosondagem	5–11 Jan 2011	1,010	**53.1**	29.7	17.2	23.4
Aximage	3–6 Jan 2011	600	**56.0**	28.1	15.9	27.9
Aximage	5–7 Dec 2010	600	**62.0**	21.1	16.9	40.9
Eurosondagem	2–7 Dec 2010	1,020	**56.2**	25.4	18.4	30.8
Marktest	16–19 Nov 2010	807	**58.2**	21.7	20.1	36.5
Eurosondagem	4–9 Nov 2010	1,025	**54.1**	25.6	20.3	28.5
UCP–CESOP	23–25 Oct 2010	1,140	**79**	21	—N/a	58
Marktest	19–24 Oct 2010	807	**52.9**	27.3	19.8	25.6
Eurosondagem	6–12 Oct 2010	1,021	**52.9**	26.3	20.8	26.6
Aximage	1–4 Oct 2010	600	**58.2**	22.2	19.6	36.0
Marktest	14–17 Sep 2010	804	**53.8**	24.0	22.2	29.8
Aximage	6–9 Sep 2010	600	**55.5**	14.5	30.0	41.0
Eurosondagem	1–7 Sep 2010	1,035	**56.0**	25.3	18.7	30.7
Eurosondagem	28 Jul–2 Aug 2010	1,031	**55.0**	25.0	20.0	30.0
Marktest	20–26 Jul 2010	802	**56.4**	23.4	20.2	33.0
Eurosondagem	1–6 Jul 2010	1,035	**52.0**	25.3	22.7	26.7
Aximage	1–4 Jul 2010	600	**56.6**	28.2	15.2	28.4
UCP–CESOP	19–21 Jun 2010	1,179	**80**	20	—N/a	60
Marktest	15–20 Jun 2010	804	**55.1**	22.3	22.6	32.8
Eurosondagem	2–8 Jun 2010	1,025	**50.8**	25.6	23.6	25.2
Marktest	18–20 May 2010	804	**60.7**	20.1	19.2	40.6
Eurosondagem	13–18 May 2010	1,024	**49.8**	26.3	23.9	23.5
Aximage	4–7 May 2010	600	**59.1**	25.1	15.8	34.0
Marktest	20–25 Apr 2010	800	**64.0**	16.0	20.0	48.0
Eurosondagem	8–13 Apr 2010	1,020	**47.1**	27.5	25.4	19.6
Aximage	5–8 Apr 2010	600	**59.6**	16.2	24.2	43.4
Marktest	16–21 Mar 2010	808	**63.5**	17.9	18.6	45.6
UCP–CESOP	6–9 Mar 2010	1,148	**87**	13	—N/a	74
Aximage	5–9 Mar 2010	600	**60.6**	16.9	22.5	43.7
Eurosondagem	4–9 Mar 2010	1,019	**43.4**	29.0	27.6	14.4
Marktest	16–21 Feb 2010	804	**55.5**	23.2	21.3	32.3
Eurosondagem	4–9 Feb 2010	1,010	**43.1**	30.2	26.7	12.9
Aximage	2–5 Feb 2010	600	**50.0**	23.9	26.1	26.1
Marktest	19–23 Jan 2010	803	**60.0**	21.0	19.0	39.0
Eurosondagem	7–12 Jan 2010	1,010	**40.6**	30.7	28.7	9.9
Aximage	6–11 Jan 2010	600	**54.8**	23.7	21.5	31.1
Aximage	7–10 Dec 2009	600	**48.1**	27.6	24.3	20.5
Eurosondagem	25 Nov–1 Dec 2009	1,031	**36.9**	31.1	32.0	5.8
Marktest	17–19 Nov 2009	808	**58.9**	21.0	20.1	37.9
Aximage	3–6 Nov 2009	600	**46.2**	27.1	26.7	19.1
Eurosondagem	29 Oct–3 Nov 2009	1,030	**35.8**	32.3	31.9	3.5
Marktest	20–24 Oct 2009	806	**58.7**	20.2	21.1	38.5
Aximage	12–16 Oct 2009	600	35.5	**42.4**	22.1	6.9
Marktest	18–21 Sep 2009	806	**67.6**	15.2	17.2	52.4
Marktest	4–7 Sep 2009	811	**67.9**	15.1	17.0	52.8
Eurosondagem	25–30 Jan 2007	1,011	**70.0**	?	?	?
Eurosondagem	29 Nov–5 Dec 2006	?	**70.1**	?	?	?
Marktest	19–22 Sep 2006	805	**63.8**	9.5	26.7	54.3
Marktest	18–21 Jul 2006	812	?	?	?	42.3
Marktest	20–23 Jun 2006	807	?	?	?	37
Marktest	16–19 May 2006	810	?	?	?	21.1
Marktest	18–21 Apr 2006	809	?	?	?	12.5

== See also ==
- Opinion polling for the 2006 Portuguese presidential election
- Opinion polling for the 2011 Portuguese presidential election
