= Nobre =

Nobre is a Portuguese surname. Notable people with the surname include:

- Alfredo Nobre da Costa (1923–1996), Portuguese engineer and politician
- Ana Luiza Nobre (born 1964), Brazilian historian and author
- Anna Christina Nobre (born 1963), Brazilian neuroscientist known as Kia Nobre
- António Nobre (1867–1900), Portuguese poet
- Camila Nobre (born 1988), Brazilian footballer and futsal player
- Carlos Nobre (rugby union) (1940–2014), Portuguese rugby union player
- Dudu Nobre (born 1974), Brazilian singer and composer
- Édson de Jesus Nobre (born 1980), Angolan footballer known simply as Edson
- Fernando Nobre (born 1951), Portuguese doctor
- Pacheco Nobre (1925–2018), Portuguese footballer
- Márcio Nobre (born 1980), Brazilian-Turkish footballer
- Marlos Nobre (1939–2024), Brazilian composer
- Paulo Nobre (born 1968), Brazilian lawyer and rally driver
