= Carlos Nobre =

Carlos Nobre may refer to:

- Carlos Nobre (rugby union)
- Carlos Nobre (scientist)
