= Opinion polling for the 2006 Portuguese presidential election =

In the run up to the 2006 Portuguese presidential election, various organisations carried out opinion polling to gauge voting intention in Portugal. Results of such polls are displayed in this article.

Poll results are listed in the table below in reverse chronological order, showing the most recent first. The highest percentage figure in each polling survey is displayed in bold, and the background shaded in the leading candidate colour. In the instance that there is a tie, then no figure is shaded but both are displayed in bold. Poll results use the date the survey's fieldwork was done, as opposed to the date of publication.

== Candidates vote ==
=== First round ===
==== Graphical summary ====
View source data.

==== Polling ====
Exit poll

Polling firm	Fieldwork date	Sample size	Cavaco Silva	Mário Soares	Manuel Alegre	Jerónimo de Sousa	Francisco Louçã	Garcia Pereira	Oth	Lead
Polling firm	Fieldwork date	Sample size	PSD	PS	Ind.	CDU	BE	PCTP	Oth	Lead
Election results	22 Jan 2006	—N/a	50.5	14.3	20.7	8.6	5.3	0.4	—	29.8 over Alegre
UCP–CESOP	22 Jan 2006	?	49–54	11–14	20–23	8–10	4–6	0–1	—	30 over Alegre
Eurosondagem	22 Jan 2006	?	50.4–54.6	12.5–16.3	17.7–21.5	6.4–8.6	4.1–6.3	0.5–1.1	—	32.9 over Alegre
Intercampus	22 Jan 2006	?	50.0–54.8	11.0–15.0	18.4–22.4	7.0–10.0	3.4–6.4	0.3–1.5	—	32.0 over Alegre
Marktest	15–18 Jan 2006	1,416	53.0	12.4	20.6	7.0	6.5	0.5	—N/a	32.4 over Alegre
Eurosondagem	15–18 Jan 2006	3,058	53.0	16.9	16.2	7.2	5.8	0.9	—N/a	36.1 over Soares
Aximage	15–18 Jan 2006	1,003	52.5	15.4	19.5	6.5	5.5	0.8	—N/a	33.0 over Alegre
UCP	14–15 Jan 2006	3,713	52	15	19	7	6	1	—N/a	33 over Alegre
Marktest	12–15 Jan 2006	812	54.6	13.1	18.4	6.6	6.4	—N/a	0.8	36.2 over Alegre
Marktest	9–11 Jan 2006	608	56.8	12.8	15.6	7.8	6.5	—N/a	0.4	41.2 over Alegre
Pitagórica	9–11 Jan 2006	605	54.7	12.4	15.9	8.7	7.1	1.3	—N/a	38.8 over Alegre
Intercampus	9–11 Jan 2006	1,010	52.4	17.0	17.4	6.9	5.8	0.4	—N/a	35.0 over Alegre
Marktest	4–7 Jan 2006	608	61.0	14.3	11.5	6.9	6.1	—N/a	0.3	46.7 over Soares
Aximage	3–5 Jan 2006	570	61	15	11	4	7	—N/a	1	46 over Soares
UCP	3–4 Jan 2006	815	60	13	16	7	4	—N/a	0	44 over Alegre
Eurosondagem	11–14 Dec 2005	2,069	55.5	20.4	12.5	5.7	4.8	—N/a	1.1	35.1 over Soares
Aximage	30 Nov–2 Dec 2005	560	58	17	14	6	5	—N/a	0	41 over Soares
GEMEO/IPAM	25 Nov–1 Dec 2005	600	63	15	16	3	3	—N/a	0	47 over Alegre
Intercampus	20–24 Nov 2005	1,001	57	15	17	6	5	—N/a	0	40 over Alegre
UCP	21–22 Nov 2005	805	57	16	17	5	4	—N/a	1	40 over Alegre
Marktest	15–19 Nov 2005	801	56	13	19	6	6	—N/a	0	37 over Alegre
Aximage	7–8 Nov 2005	544	58	12	19	6	4	—N/a	1	39 over Alegre
Eurosondagem	3–8 Nov 2005	1,577	52.6	18.0	16.9	5.6	6.2	—N/a	0.6	34.6 over Soares
Marktest	18–21 Oct 2005	805	58	12	16	5	6	—N/a	2	42 over Alegre
Aximage	17–19 Oct 2005	582	62	11	17	4	3	—N/a	2	45 over Alegre
Intercampus (Note: Results presented here exclude undecideds (12.7%). With their inclusion results are: Cavaco Silva: 45.9%; Manuel Alegre: 16.5%; Mário Soares: 15.8%; Francisco Louçã: 5.4%; Jerónimo de Sousa: 3.7%.)	3–6 Oct 2005	1,004	52.6	18.1	18.9	4.2	6.2	—N/a	0.0	33.7 over Alegre
Marktest	20–26 Sep 2005	803	48.6	14.5	10.6	4.2	6.0	—N/a	15.8	34.1 over Soares
Aximage	17–18 Sep 2005	502	50.6	21.7	—N/a	4.7	4.3	—N/a	18.7	28.9 over Soares
Aximage	17–18 Sep 2005	502	45.9	18.4	13.5	3.5	2.8	—N/a	15.9 (Note: Paulo Portas: 3.2%.)	27.5 over Soares
UCP	9 Sep 2005	961	49	32	—N/a	7	11	—N/a	1	17 over Soares
Aximage	5–6 Sep 2005	600	53.4	36.2	—N/a	—N/a	—N/a	—N/a	10.4	17.2 over Soares
Marktest	18–21 Jan 2005	801	39.5	9.2	—N/a	—N/a	—N/a	—N/a	51.3 (Note: António Guterres: 11.5%; Marcelo Rebelo de Sousa: 9.3%; Diogo Freitas do Amaral: 5.6%; João Bosco Mota Amaral: 3.0%; Pedro Santana Lopes: 2.5%; Jaime Gama: 2.1%; João Soares: 0.8%.)	28.0 over Guterres
Marktest	19–21 Oct 2004	813	35.8	6.4	—N/a	—N/a	—N/a	—N/a	57.8 (Note: António Guterres: 16.7%; Marcelo Rebelo de Sousa: 12.8%; Diogo Freitas do Amaral: 2.5%; João Bosco Mota Amaral: 1.9%; Jaime Gama: 1.4%; João Soares: 1.1%.)	19.1 over Guterres
Marktest	14–16 Sep 2004	808	39	8	—N/a	—N/a	—N/a	—N/a	53 (Note: António Guterres: 15%; Marcelo Rebelo de Sousa: 13%; Diogo Freitas do Amaral: 3%; João Bosco Mota Amaral: 2%; Jaime Gama: 2%; João Soares: 1%.)	24 over Guterres

=== Second round ===
Hypothetical polling

Polling firm	Date conducted	Sample size	Cavaco Silva	Manuel Alegre	Mário Soares	António Guterres	Rebelo de Sousa	Santana Lopes	Oth/ Und	Lead
Polling firm	Date conducted	Sample size	PSD	Ind.	PS	PS	PSD	PSD	Oth/ Und	Lead
UCP	3–4 Jan 2006	815	**63**	37	—N/a	—N/a	—N/a	—N/a	—N/a	26
UCP	3–4 Jan 2006	815	**71**	—N/a	29	—N/a	—N/a	—N/a	—N/a	42
UCP	21–22 Nov 2005	805	**65**	35	—N/a	—N/a	—N/a	—N/a	—N/a	30
UCP	21–22 Nov 2005	805	**72**	—N/a	28	—N/a	—N/a	—N/a	—N/a	44
Marktest	18–21 Oct 2005	805	**57.2**	29.6	—N/a	—N/a	—N/a	—N/a	13.2	27.6
Marktest	18–21 Oct 2005	805	**60.0**	—N/a	21.6	—N/a	—N/a	—N/a	18.4	38.4
Intercampus	3–6 Oct 2005	1,004	**59.3**	34.9	—N/a	—N/a	—N/a	—N/a	5.8	24.4
Intercampus	3–6 Oct 2005	1,004	**64.9**	—N/a	33.7	—N/a	—N/a	—N/a	1.4	31.2
Marktest	20–26 Sep 2005	803	**58.2**	25.4	—N/a	—N/a	—N/a	—N/a	16.4	32.8
Marktest	20–26 Sep 2005	803	**58.5**	—N/a	22.7	—N/a	—N/a	—N/a	18.8	35.8
Aximage	17–18 Sep 2005	502	**54.2**	—N/a	29.4	—N/a	—N/a	—N/a	16.4	24.8
UCP	9 Sep 2005	961	**64**	—N/a	36	—N/a	—N/a	—N/a	—N/a	28
Marktest	18–21 Jan 2005	801	**58.7**	—N/a	—N/a	27.9	—N/a	—N/a	13.4	30.8
Marktest	18–21 Jan 2005	801	—N/a	—N/a	—N/a	32	**48**	—N/a	20	16
Marktest	18–21 Jan 2005	801	—N/a	—N/a	—N/a	**54**	—N/a	22	24	32
