= Manuel Alegre =

Portuguese poet and politician (born 1936)

Manuel Alegre GCL GCSE GCCa
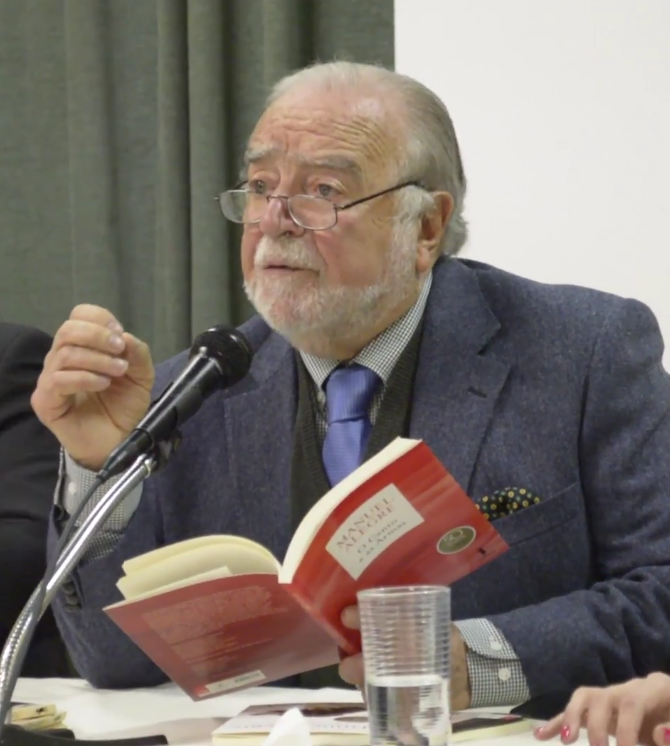
- Manuel Alegre in 2017

Honorary President of the Socialist Party
- Incumbent
- Assumed office 7 January 2024
- Secretary-General: Pedro Nuno Santos; José Luís Carneiro
- Preceded by: António Arnaut

Member of the Council of State
- In office 22 June 2022 – 19 June 2024
- Appointed by: Assembly of the Republic
- President: Marcelo Rebelo de Sousa
- In office 15 July 2005 – 22 October 2015
- Appointed by: Assembly of the Republic
- President: Jorge Sampaio; Aníbal Cavaco Silva
- In office 29 April 1996 – 6 June 2002
- Appointed by: Assembly of the Republic
- President: Jorge Sampaio

Vice President of the Assembly of the Republic
- In office 27 October 1995 – 14 October 2009
- President: António Almeida Santos; João Bosco Mota Amaral; Jaime Gama

Member of the Assembly of the Republic
- In office 5 April 2002 – 14 October 2009
- Constituency: Lisbon
- In office 2 June 1975 – 4 April 2002
- Constituency: Coimbra

Personal details
- Born: Manuel Alegre de Melo Duarte; 12 May 1936 (age 89) Águeda, Portugal
- Party: Socialist Party
- Children: 3

Manuel Alegre de Melo Duarte GCL GCSE GCCa (born 12 May 1936) is a Portuguese poet and politician. He was a candidate to the presidency of the Portuguese Republic in 2006 and 2011, finishing in second place in both elections. For his literary work, he was awarded the Camões Prize in 2017.

== Background ==
He is the son of Francisco José de Faria e Melo Ferreira Duarte, brother of sportsman Mário Duarte, son of the 1st Baroness of a Recosta, maternal grandson of the 1st Baron of Cadoro and matrilineal great-grandson of the 1st Viscount of o Barreiro, and wife Maria Manuela Alegre. His sister Maria Teresa Alegre de Melo Duarte is also a Deputy and is the widow of another Deputy, António Jorge Moreira Portugal (1931–1994). Their son is journalist Manuel Alegre Portugal. As he once stated, his ancestors were hanged and beheaded at the Praça Nova, Porto, during the Liberal Wars.

== Career ==
He was a member of the Portuguese Communist Party from his youth until the Soviet invasion of Czechoslovakia, which he staunchly opposed, in 1968. Today he's usually considered one of the most leftist members of the Portuguese Socialist Party. He voted against all the revisions of the Portuguese Constitution of 1976, and abstained at a commemorative vote for the 10th anniversary of the fall of Berlin Wall, in 1999.

While studying law at the University of Coimbra, Alegre was noticed for his opposition to António de Oliveira Salazar's dictatorial government - the Estado Novo regime. He was conscripted, and sent to the Azores and later to Portuguese Angola, where his involvement in an attempt to military rebellion led to his imprisonment. After serving his prison term in Luanda, he returned to Coimbra, before going into exile in 1964. As a student at the University of Coimbra he was a very active figure of the Associação Académica de Coimbra, the university's student's union, while member of the governing body, athlete and cultural agent (poetry and theatre). He would never graduate in law.

He would live the next ten years in Algiers, where he was one of the main voices of a radio station directed to Portugal, Rádio Voz da Liberdade (Freedom's Voice), also called Rádio Argel, from where he reportedly led a series of activities supporting African forces opposing the Portuguese military intervention in the Portuguese Colonial War, including by airing privileged information regarding Portuguese strategy in the theater of war. The distribution of his first books was forbidden by Salazar's government, so they circulated in samizdat form. Alegre returned to Portugal in 1974, one week after the Carnation Revolution.

He joined the Socialist Party almost immediately, and was elected to Parliament in every election from 1975 to 2005. He was also one of the vice-presidents of Parliament.

Several of his poems were made into songs, sung among others by Zeca Afonso and Adriano Correia de Oliveira, and played by Carlos Paredes. His words were set to music by Tony Haynes on world jazz ensemble Grand Union Orchestra's 1997 album, The Rhythm of Tides.

One of his poems Uma flor de verde pinho won 1976's Festival RTP da Canção, who represented Portugal in Eurovision Song Contest.

In 2004, he lost to José Sócrates a bid for the party leadership.

In 2005, a statue in his honour was erected in Coimbra.

On 24 September 2005, he announced that he would be a candidate in the 2006 presidential election, despite his party's official support for former president Mário Soares as a candidate. On the elections held 22 January 2006, he ended up collecting 20.7% of the valid votes (the second largest amount after the elected President, Cavaco Silva, and ahead of his party's official candidate Mário Soares).

He was also a Member of the Portuguese Council of State, elected by the Assembly of the Republic.

== Decorations ==
- Grand Cross of the Order of Liberty, Portugal (GCL, 19 May 1989)
- Grand Cross of the Military Order of Saint James of the Sword, Portugal (GCSE, 20 May 2016)
- Grand Cross of the Order of Camões, Portugal (GCCa, 15 April 2024)

== Family ==
He was once married to Isabel Sousa Pires, born in Figueira da Foz, without issue, and is now married to Mafalda Maria de Campos Durão Ferreira, born in Lisbon, 13 December 1947, daughter of António Durão Ferreira and wife Fernanda Furtado de Antas de Campos and only sister of António Miguel de Campos Durão Ferreira (b. 21 January 1946, unmarried), and has three children:

- Francisco Durão Ferreira Alegre Duarte
- Afonso Durão Ferreira Alegre Duarte (b. 1976)
- Joana Durão Ferreira Alegre Duarte (b. 1985)

== Electoral history ==
=== PS leadership election, 2004 ===
Ballot: 25 and 26 September 2004
| Candidate | Votes | % |
|---|---|---|
| José Sócrates | 28,984 | 79.5 |
| Manuel Alegre | 5,693 | 15.6 |
| João Soares | 1,505 | 4.1 |
| Blank/Invalid ballots | 271 | 0.7 |
| Turnout | 36,453 | 48.20 |
Source: Acção Socialista

=== Presidential election, 2006 ===
Ballot: 22 January 2006
| Candidate | Votes | % |
|---|---|---|
| Aníbal Cavaco Silva | 2,773,431 | 50.5 |
| Manuel Alegre | 1,138,297 | 20.7 |
| Mário Soares | 785,355 | 14.3 |
| Jerónimo de Sousa | 474,083 | 8.6 |
| Francisco Louçã | 292,198 | 5.3 |
| Garcia Pereira | 23,983 | 0.4 |
| Blank/Invalid ballots | 102,785 | – |
| Turnout | 5,590,132 | 61.53 |
Source: Comissão Nacional de Eleições

=== Presidential election, 2011 ===
Ballot: 23 January 2011
| Candidate | Votes | % |
|---|---|---|
| Aníbal Cavaco Silva | 2,231,956 | 53.0 |
| Manuel Alegre | 831,838 | 19.7 |
| Fernando Nobre | 593,021 | 14.1 |
| Francisco Lopes | 301,017 | 7.1 |
| José Manuel Coelho | 189,918 | 4.5 |
| Defensor Moura | 67,110 | 1.6 |
| Blank/Invalid ballots | 277,593 | – |
| Turnout | 4,492,453 | 46.52 |
Source: Comissão Nacional de Eleições

== Bibliography ==
Poetry

- Praça da Canção (1965)
- O Canto e as Armas (1967)
- Um Barco para Ítaca (1971)
- Letras (1974)
- Coisa Amar, Coisas do Mar (1976)
- Nova do Achamento (1979)
- Atlântico (1981)
- Babilónia (1983)
- Chegar Aqui (1984)
- Aicha Conticha (1984)
- Obra Poética, Vol. I, O Canto e as Armas (1989)
- Obra Poética, Vol. II, Atlântico (1989)
- Rua de Baixo (1990)
- A Rosa e o Compasso (1991)
- Com que Pena (1992)
- Sonetos do Obscuro Quê (1993)
- Coimbra Nunca Vista (1995)
- Trinta Anos de Poesia (1993)
- As Naus de Verde Pinho (1996)
- Alentejo e Ninguém (1996)
- Che (1997)
- Senhora das Tempestades (1998)
- Pico (1998)
- Rouxinol do Mundo (1998)
- Obra Poética (1999)
- Livro do Português Errante (2001)
- Diálogos = Cristina Valada + Manuel Alegre (2001)

Prose

- Jornada de África (1989)
- O Homem do País Azul (1989)
- Alma (1995)
- Contra a Corrente (1997)
- A Terceira Rosa (1998)
- Uma Carga de Cavalaria (1999)
- Arte de Marear (2002)
- Cão Como Nós (2002)
- Um Velho em Arzila (2003)
- Rafael (2004)
- O Quadrado (2005)
- Tudo é, e não é (2013)
