= 2011 Portuguese presidential election =

- 23 January 2011
- Opinion polls
- Turnout: 46.52% (▼15.01pp)
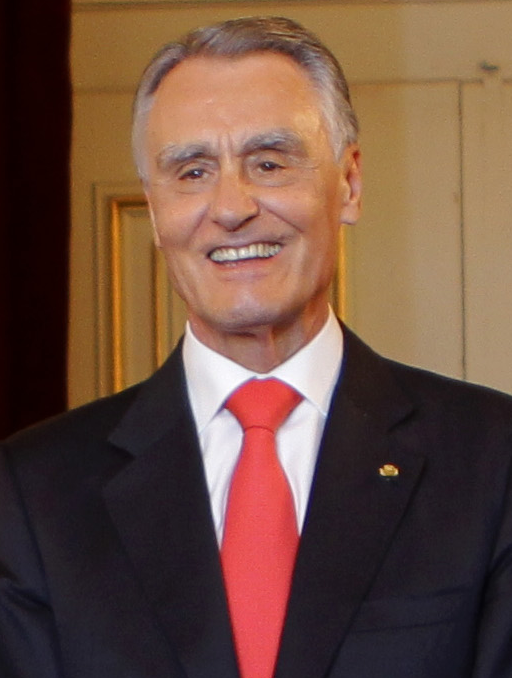

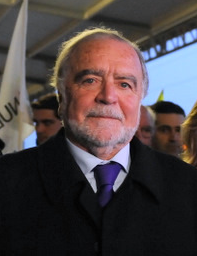

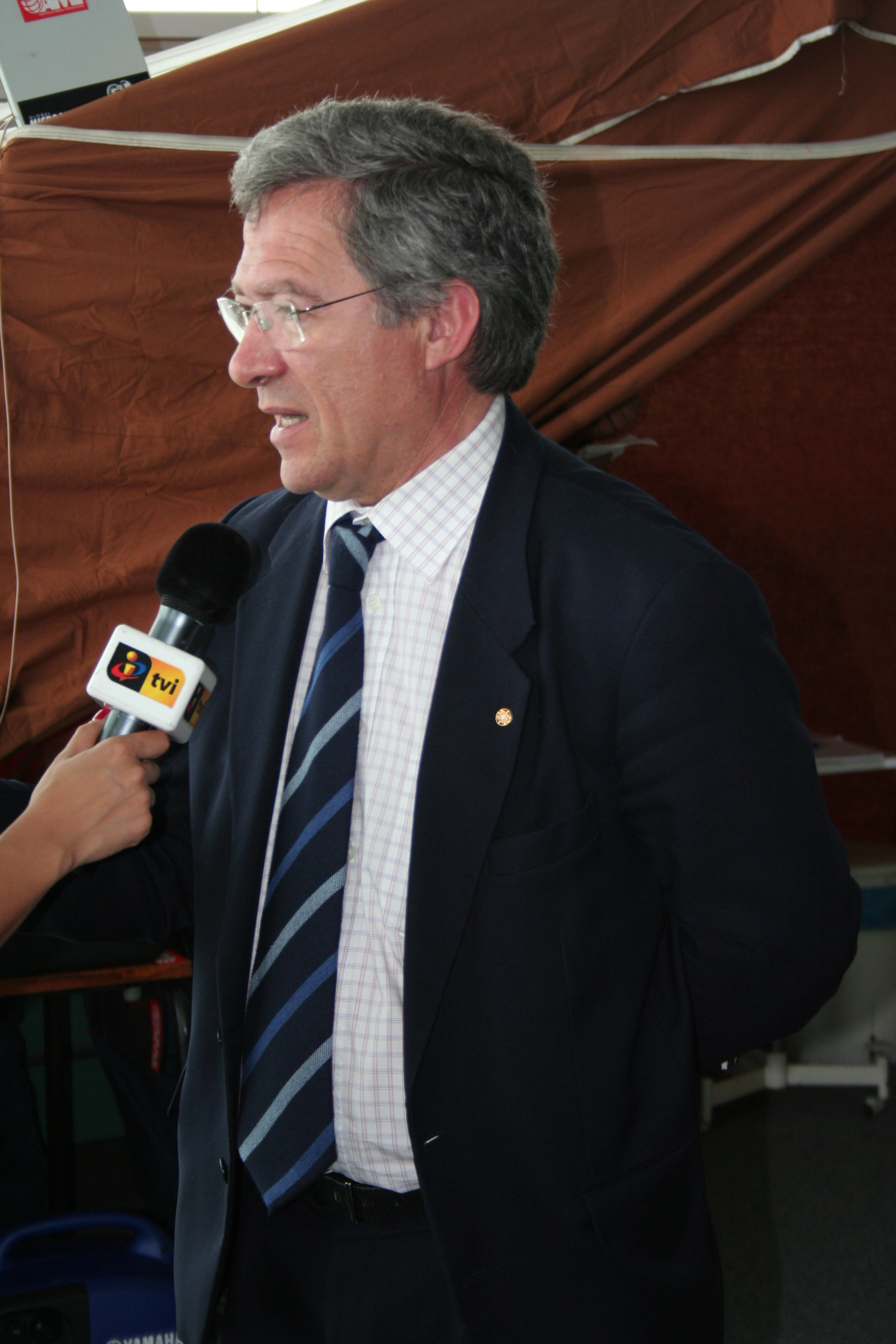

| Candidate | Aníbal Cavaco Silva | Manuel Alegre |
| Party | PSD Supported by: CDS–PP; MEP | PS Supported by: BE; PCTP/MRPP; PDA |
| Popular vote | 2,231,956 | 831,838 |
| Percentage | 52.95% | 19.74% |
| Candidate | Fernando Nobre | Francisco Lopes |
| Party | Independent | PCP Supported by: PEV |
| Popular vote | 593,021 | 301,017 |
| Percentage | 14.07% | 7.14% |
- Cavaco Silva 20-30% 30-40% 40-50% 50-60% 60-70% 70-80% 80-90% Alegre 30-40% Lopes 30-40% 40-50% Coelho 40-50%
President before election
Aníbal Cavaco Silva
PSD
Elected President
Aníbal Cavaco Silva
PSD

A presidential election was held in Portugal on 23 January 2011. Incumbent head of state Aníbal Cavaco Silva ran for a second term as president, facing a rematch by Manuel Alegre, this time with the support of the PS and also the Left Bloc (BE).

Cavaco Silva won re-election by a landslide, with 53 percent of the votes, winning all 18 districts, both autonomous regions of Azores and Madeira and 292 municipalities out of a total of 308. Manuel Alegre polled once again second, but below his 2006 result, with just 19.7 percent of the votes and polling first in just 3 municipalities, whereas independent candidate Fernando Nobre finished a strong third with 14 percent of the votes. The communist supported candidate, Francisco Lopes, achieved a rather strong result, taking into account his low recognition in the electorate, by gathering 7 percent of the votes and taking first place in 10 municipalities, while novelty candidate José Manuel Coelho surprised with 4.5 percent of the votes, having performed well in his native Madeira.

Turnout in this election was very low, with only 46.52 percent of the electorate casting a ballot, the lowest till then (only surpassed in 2021). Cavaco Silva was sworn in for a second term as President on 9 March 2011.

== Background ==
In the 2006 presidential election, former Prime Minister Aníbal Cavaco Silva, the only candidate of the center-right, was elected on the first round with 50.5 percent of the votes. He had faced two particular candidates from the ruling Socialist Party, the official candidate Mário Soares, former President of the Republic came in third with 14.3 percent, and Manuel Alegre, a dissident, who ranked second with 20.7 percent of votes. This historic victory of a conservative candidate, the first after the Carnation Revolution, inaugurated a period of "political cohabitation" with Socialist Prime Minister José Sócrates. In the beginning, the relationship between Cavaco and Sócrates was good, but by the middle of the president's first term, it became more tense, reaching a breaking point in 2009.

The president started warning about the country's economic situation, mainly unemployment, and also disagreeing with the government regarding legislation. Plus, just before the September 2009 legislative election, which returned the PS to power, albeit under a minority capacity, the presidency started to suspect that they were being monitored by the government through wiretaps. Furthermore, a banking scandal that led to the nationalization of a bank managed by figures close to the president also created more friction between Cavaco Silva and prime minister José Sócrates. By the same time, the country's economic situation worsened, following the 2008 financial crisis and the Euro area crisis, with the government being forced to adopt austerity measures and budget cuts, leading the head of state to intervene and mediate talks between the government and the PSD opposition, but with the president and the prime minister publicly clashing regarding the state of the country.

=== Pre-campaign ===
In the follow-up for the presidential election, with Cavaco Silva having strong approval ratings and his re-election being virtually guaranteed, divisions once again emerged in the Socialist Party regarding a candidate to face Cavaco, with the party fragmenting their votes between three candidates: the official party supported Manuel Alegre, independent Fernando Nobre, and party dissident, and former mayor of Viana do Castelo, Defensor Moura. The Left Bloc's support for Alegre also generated divisions and criticisms. On the left-wing, the communists launched a relatively unknown candidate, party employee Francisco Lopes, while protest candidate José Manuel Coelho also filed a candidacy.

== Electoral system ==
Any Portuguese citizen over 35 years old has the opportunity to run for president. In order to do so it is necessary to gather between 7,500 and 15,000 signatures and submit them to the Portuguese Constitutional Court.

According to the Portuguese Constitution, to be elected, a candidate needs a simple majority (50% + 1). If no candidate gets this majority there is a second round between the two most voted candidates. Changes to the electoral registration system, approved in 2008, which made registration automatic based on each voter's Identity card, led to a significant increase in the number of registered voters, from 9,1 million in 2006 to 9,7 million in 2011.

== Candidates ==
=== Official candidates ===
| Candidate | Party support | Political office(s) | Details | Ref. |
|---|---|---|---|---|
| Aníbal Cavaco Silva (71) | Social Democratic Party CDS – People's Party Hope for Portugal Movement | President of the Republic (2006–2016); Prime Minister (1985–1995); President of the Social Democratic Party (1985–1995); Minister of Finance (1980–1981) | Incumbent President after winning the 2006 presidential election with 50.5% of the votes; eligible for a second term. | |
| Manuel Alegre (74) | Socialist Party Left Bloc Portuguese Workers' Communist Party Democratic Party of the Atlantic | Member of the Council of State (1996–2002; 2005–2015); Vice President of the Assembly of the Republic (1995–2009); Member of the Assembly of the Republic (1975–2009); Secretary of State Adjunct of the Prime Minister (1977–1978); Secretary of State for Social Communication (1976–1977) | Socialist Party (PS) member; candidate in the 2006 presidential election, finishing second with 20.7% of the votes. | |
| Fernando Nobre (59) | None | None | Independent; physician; founder and head of the International Medical Assistance (AMI); member of Médecins Sans Frontières. | |
| Francisco Lopes (55) | Portuguese Communist Party Ecologist Party "The Greens" | Member of the Assembly of the Republic (2005–2019) | Portuguese Communist Party (PCP) member; electrician. | |
| José Manuel Coelho (58) | New Democracy Party | Member of the Legislative Assembly of Madeira (2008–2018) | Satirical candidate. | |
| Defensor Moura (65) | None | Member of the Assembly of the Republic (1985–1987; 2009–2011); Mayor of Viana do Castelo (1994–2009) | Socialist Party (PS) member, failed to receive the support of the party; physician. | |

=== Unsuccessful candidacies ===
Official logo of the election.

- Luís Botelho Ribeiro – Leader of the Pro-life party. His application was formalised on Monday, 20 December, with over 8,000 signatures. His candidacy was analysed by the Constitutional Court. On 29 December, the court concluded that his candidacy did not meet the requirements provided by law.
- José Ribeiro e Castro – Member of the Democratic and Social Centre – People´s Party, speculated to run as an alternative right-wing candidate, because of Cavaco's decision to approve same-sex marriage. However, he did not go forward with his candidacy.
- José Pinto Coelho – Leader of the far-right National Renovator Party. He declared that his candidacy for the presidency was "cut short" by failing to gather the 7,500 signatures required. He claimed to have gathered 5,878 signatures.

== Campaign period ==
=== Issues ===
The country's deep economic crisis and the Portuguese Bank of Business (BPN) case dominated the campaign. On this latter issue, the nationalization of the bank, linked to figures from the Cavacoism era, created an embarrassment for the incumbent President, with his opponents questioning his silence and relationship with those involved in the bank's collapse. Cavaco accused his adversaries of "vile baseness" and of spreading lies and insinuations. On the left-wing, Manuel Alegre repeated his 2006 run, but this time with the official support from the PS and the Left Bloc. However, his candidacy created divisions within the Socialists, with some supporting the independent candidacy of Fernando Nobre, including the wife and daughter of former president Mário Soares, while Soares himself criticized the PS support for Alegre and refused to endorse him.

=== Party slogans ===
| Candidate | Original slogan | English translation | Refs |
|---|---|---|---|
| Aníbal Cavaco Silva | « Acredito nos Portugueses » | "I believe in the Portuguese" | |
| Manuel Alegre | « Um Presidente justo e solidário » | "A fair and supportive President" | |
| Fernando Nobre | « Um Presidente como nós » | "A President like us" | |
| Francisco Lopes | « O voto certo na mudança necessária » | "The right vote in the necessary change" | |
| Defensor Moura | « Contra a resignação » | "Against resignation" | |

=== Candidates' debates ===
2011 Portuguese presidential election debates
| Date | Organisers | Moderator(s) | P Present A Absent invitee N Non-invitee | | | | | |
| Date | Organisers | Moderator(s) | Cavaco | Alegre | Nobre | Lopes | Moura | Refs |
|---|---|---|---|---|---|---|---|---|
| 14 Dec 2010 | RTP1 | Judite de Sousa | N | N | P | P | N | |
| 16 Dec 2010 | RTP1 | Judite de Sousa | N | P | N | N | P | |
| 17 Dec 2010 | SIC | Clara de Sousa | P | N | P | N | N | |
| 18 Dec 2010 | SIC | Clara de Sousa | N | P | N | P | N | |
| 21 Dec 2010 | TVI | Constança Cunha e Sá | P | N | N | P | N | |
| 22 Dec 2010 | TVI | Constança Cunha e Sá | N | P | P | N | N | |
| 23 Dec 2010 | SIC | Clara de Sousa | P | N | N | N | P | |
| 27 Dec 2010 | RTP1 | Judite de Sousa | N | N | P | N | P | |
| 28 Dec 2010 | TVI | Constança Cunha e Sá | N | N | N | P | P | |
| 29 Dec 2010 | RTP1 | Judite de Sousa | P | P | N | N | N | |

== Opinion polls ==
View source data.

== Campaign budgets ==
| Candidate (party) | Election Result | State Subsidy | | Political Parties Contributions | Fundraising | Total Recipes | | Expenses | Debt |
| Candidate (party) | Election Result | Calculated | Budgeted | Political Parties Contributions | Fundraising | Calculated | Budgeted | Expenses | Debt |
|---|---|---|---|---|---|---|---|---|---|
| Cavaco Silva (PSD, CDS-PP, MEP) | 53.0% | €1,920,000 | €1,570,000 | €0 | €550,000 | €2,470,000 | €2,120,000 | €2,120,000 | €0 |
| Manuel Alegre (PS, BE, PDA, PCTP) | 19.7% | €836,000 | €1,350,000 | €500,000 | €50,000 | €1,386,000 | €1,900,000 | €1,640,000 | €254,000 |
| Fernando Nobre (I) | 14.1% | €653,000 | €511,200 | €0 | €331,460 | €984,460 | €842,660 | €842,660 | €0 |
| Francisco Lopes (PCP, PEV) | 7.1% | €425,000 | €512,000 | €270,000 | €18,000 | €713,000 | €800,000 | €800,000 | €87,000 |
| Defensor Moura (I) | 1.6% | €0 | €225,000 | €0 | €25,000 | €25,000 | €250,000 | €250,000 | €225,000 |
| José Manuel Coelho (PND) | 4.5% | €0 | €10,000 | €30,000 | €50,000 | €80,000 | €90,000 | €90,000 | €10,000 |
| Luís Botelho Ribeiro (PPV) | - | - | €7,000 | €0 | €0 | €7,000 | €7,000 | €7,000 | €0 |
Source: Portuguese Constitutional Court (TC) (Note that some candidates filed with the TC, but did not pursue their candidacy.)

== Voter turnout ==
The table below shows voter turnout throughout election day including voters from Overseas.

| Turnout | Time | | | | | | | | |
| Turnout | 12:00 | | | 16:00 | | | 19:00 | | |
| Turnout | 2006 | 2011 | ± | 2006 | 2011 | ± | 2006 | 2011 | ± |
|---|---|---|---|---|---|---|---|---|---|
| Total | 19.32% | 13.39% | ▼5.93 pp | 45.56% | 35.16% | ▼10.40 pp | 61.53% | 46.52% | ▼15.01 pp |

== Results ==
=== National summary ===
| Candidate | Party | Votes | % |
|---|---|---|---|
| Aníbal Cavaco Silva | Social Democratic Party (Note: Also supported by CDS – People's Party and the Hope for Portugal Movement.) | 2,231,956 | 52.95 |
| Manuel Alegre | Socialist Party (Note: Also supported by the Left Bloc, the Portuguese Workers' Communist Party and the Democratic Party of the Atlantic.) | 831,838 | 19.74 |
| Fernando Nobre | Independent | 593,021 | 14.07 |
| Francisco Lopes | Portuguese Communist Party (Note: Also supported by the Ecologist Party "The Greens".) | 301,017 | 7.14 |
| José Manuel Coelho | New Democracy Party | 189,918 | 4.51 |
| Defensor Moura | Independent | 67,110 | 1.59 |
| Total | | 4,214,860 | 100.00 |
| Valid votes | | 4,214,860 | 93.82 |
| Invalid votes | | 85,466 | 1.90 |
| Blank votes | | 192,127 | 4.28 |
| Total votes | | 4,492,453 | 100.00 |
| Registered voters/turnout | | 9,657,312 | 46.52 |
Source: Comissão Nacional de Eleições

=== Results by district ===
| District | Cavaco | | Alegre | | Nobre | | Lopes | | Manuel Coelho | | Defensor Moura | | Turnout |
| District | Votes | % | Votes | % | Votes | % | Votes | % | Votes | % | Votes | % | Turnout |
|---|---|---|---|---|---|---|---|---|---|---|---|---|---|
| Aveiro | 182,730 | 60.70% | 52,820 | 17.55% | 40,873 | 13.58% | 11,190 | 3.72% | 9,924 | 3.30% | 3,487 | 1.16% | 49.25% |
| Azores | 36,122 | 56.04% | 16,197 | 25.13% | 7,037 | 10.92% | 1,464 | 2.27% | 2,925 | 4.54% | 714 | 1.11% | 31.12% |
| Beja | 18,754 | 33.31% | 14,300 | 25.40% | 6,108 | 10.85% | 14,886 | 26.44% | 1,667 | 2.96% | 588 | 1.04% | 43.50% |
| Braga | 222,444 | 57.77% | 74,086 | 19.24% | 50,336 | 13.07% | 17,189 | 4.46% | 14,137 | 3.67% | 6,875 | 1.79% | 52.54% |
| Bragança | 37,456 | 65.11% | 10,860 | 18.88% | 5,453 | 9.48% | 1,632 | 2.84% | 1,526 | 2.65% | 603 | 1.05% | 39.10% |
| Castelo Branco | 45,518 | 53.81% | 45,518 | 22.64% | 10,518 | 12.43% | 4,488 | 5.31% | 3,798 | 4.49% | 1,121 | 1.33% | 47.07% |
| Coimbra | 85,579 | 52.02% | 38,155 | 23.19% | 23,811 | 14.47% | 9,285 | 5.64% | 5,934 | 3.61% | 1,746 | 1.06% | 45.15% |
| Évora | 24,250 | 37.63% | 15,886 | 24.65% | 7,643 | 11.86% | 13,962 | 21.67% | 2,050 | 3.18% | 651 | 1.01% | 46.52% |
| Faro | 76,896 | 52.27% | 27,248 | 18.52% | 23,474 | 15.96% | 10,889 | 7.40% | 6,048 | 4.36% | 2,186 | 1.49% | 43.91% |
| Guarda | 42,762 | 59.98% | 13,608 | 19.09% | 8,903 | 12.49% | 2,706 | 3.80% | 2,542 | 3.57% | 771 | 1.08% | 43.62% |
| Leiria | 118,748 | 61.64% | 28,095 | 14.58% | 27,855 | 14.46% | 9,040 | 4.69% | 6,632 | 3.44% | 2,266 | 1.18% | 48.94% |
| Lisbon | 411,341 | 48.59% | 184,446 | 21.79% | 136,633 | 16.14% | 72,465 | 8.56% | 29,070 | 3.43% | 12,668 | 1.50% | 48.46% |
| Madeira | 52,168 | 44.01% | 9,105 | 7.68% | 7,687 | 6.48% | 2,346 | 1.98% | 46,247 | 39.01% | 986 | 0.83% | 47.92% |
| Portalegre | 20,360 | 44.69% | 12,038 | 26.42% | 5,062 | 11.11% | 5,895 | 12.94% | 1,667 | 3.66% | 537 | 1.18% | 45.27% |
| Porto | 415,408 | 54.83% | 151,668 | 20.02% | 113,613 | 14.99% | 41,839 | 5.52% | 24,748 | 3.27% | 10,415 | 1.37% | 51.41% |
| Santarém | 95,479 | 51.90% | 35,723 | 19.42% | 28,061 | 15.25% | 15,462 | 8.40% | 7,148 | 3.89% | 2,108 | 1.15% | 48.72% |
| Setúbal | 109,800 | 36.57% | 70,480 | 23.48% | 50,762 | 16.91% | 54,472 | 18.14% | 10,560 | 3.52% | 4,147 | 1.38% | 45.27% |
| Viana do Castelo | 64,719 | 58.66% | 14,854 | 13.64% | 10,962 | 9.94% | 3,937 | 3.57% | 4,105 | 3.72% | 11,745 | 10.65% | 45.24% |
| Vila Real | 59,378 | 65.47% | 16,431 | 18.12% | 8,610 | 9.49% | 2,536 | 2.80% | 2,853 | 3.15% | 889 | 0.98% | 40.16% |
| Viseu | 103,576 | 64.97% | 25,053 | 15.71% | 19,795 | 12.42% | 4,575 | 2.87% | 4,971 | 3.12% | 1,460 | 0.92% | 44.05% |
| Overseas | 8,115 | 65.39% | 2,432 | 19.60% | 872 | 7.03% | 663 | 5.34% | 179 | 1.44% | 149 | 1.20% | 5.54% |
Source: 2011 Presidential election results

=== Maps ===
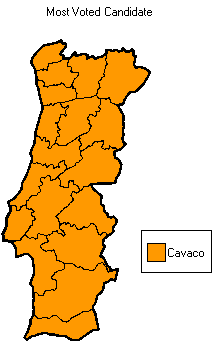
Strongest candidate by electoral district. (Azores and Madeira not shown)

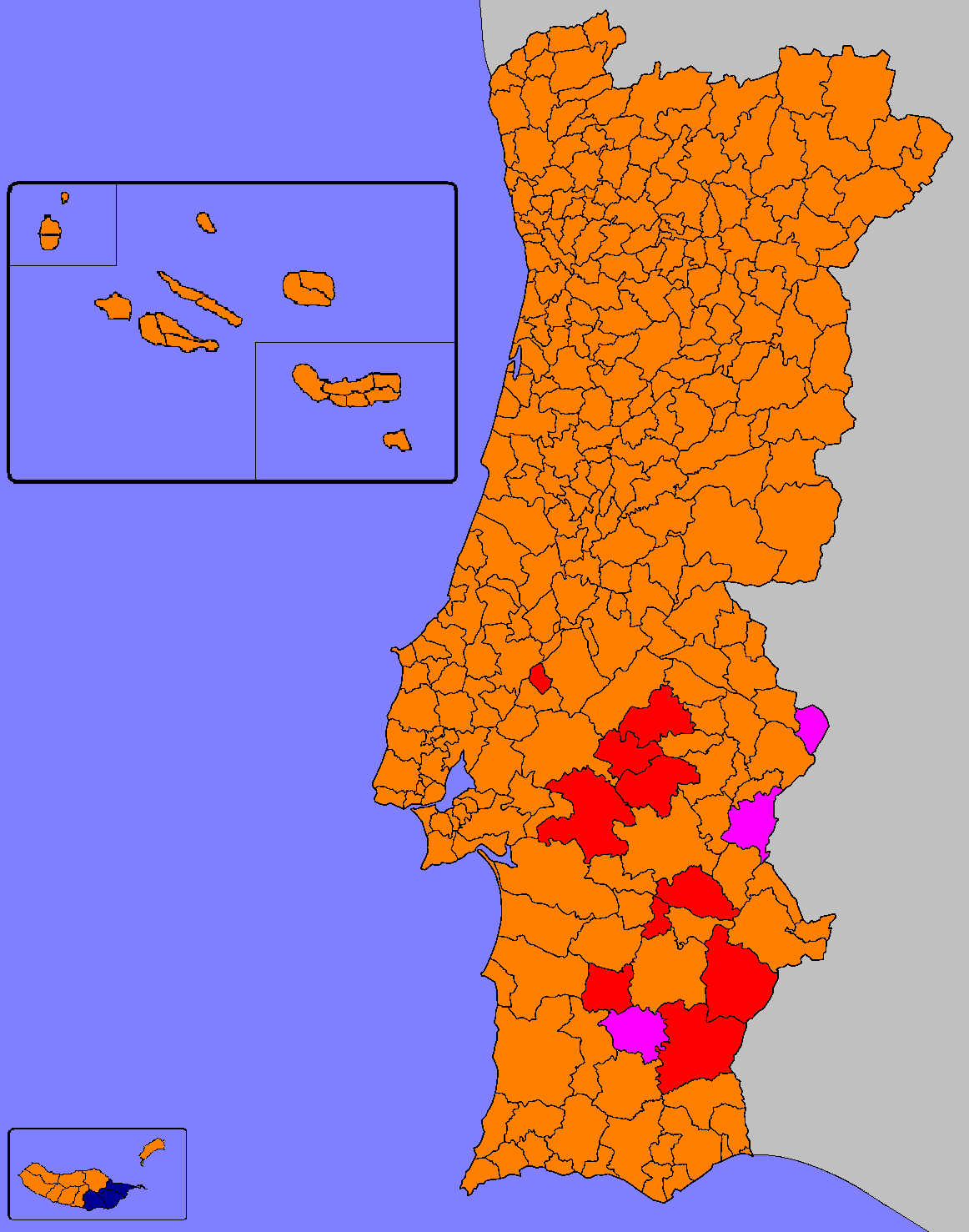
Strongest candidate by municipality.
