= Fernando Nobre =

Portuguese doctor

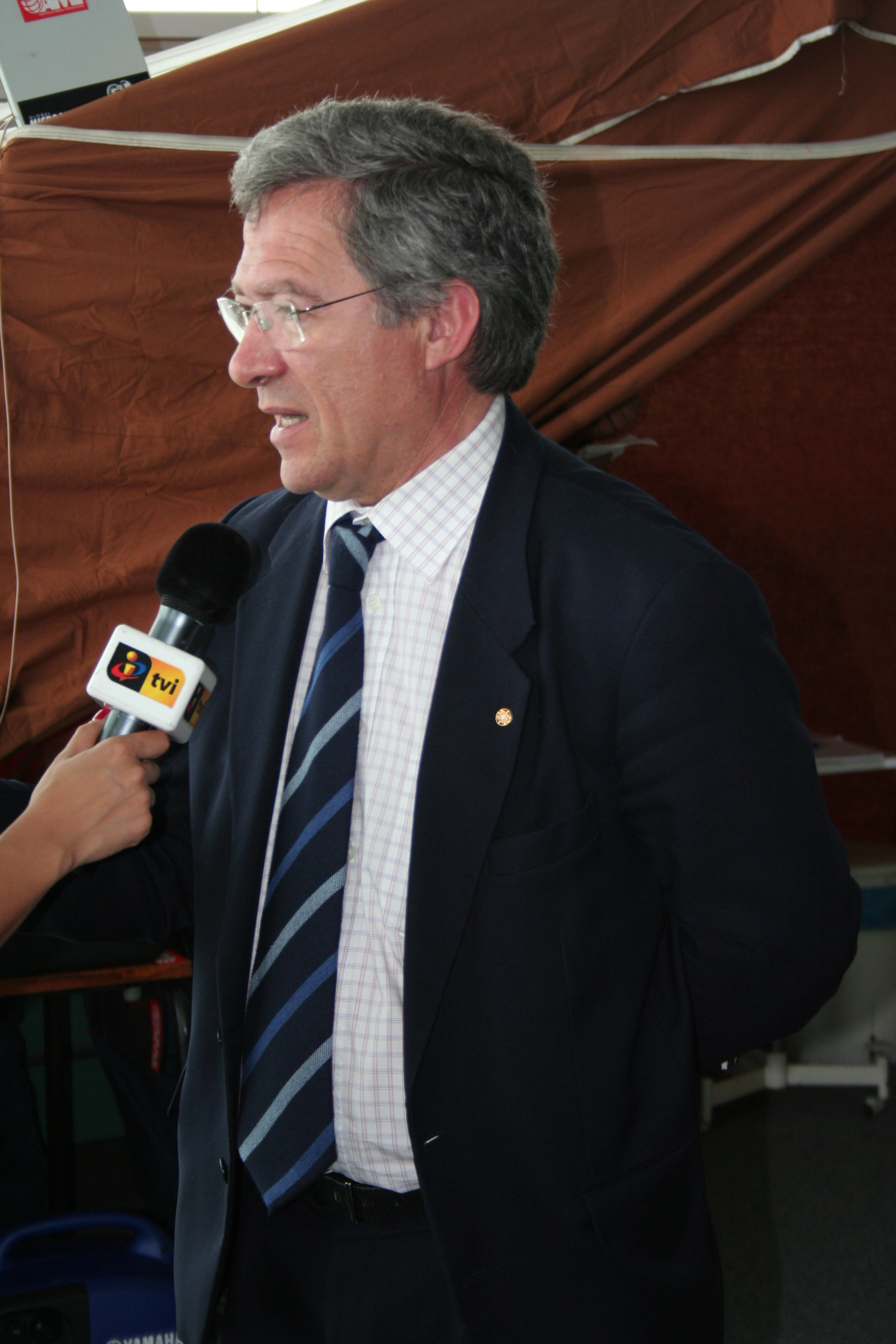

Member of the Assembly of the Republic
- In office June 20, 2011 – July 1, 2011
- Constituency: Lisbon

Personal details
- Born: 16 December 1951 (age 74) Luanda, Portuguese Angola
- Party: Independent
- Profession: Doctor

Fernando José de La Vieter Ribeiro Nobre (born 16 December 1951) is a Portuguese doctor who is the founder and president of the Portuguese NGO AMI (Global Humanitarian Action). In 2007 he was voted as the 25th greatest Portuguese ever in the contest Os Grandes Portugueses, being the 5th most voted among Portuguese living people at that date. He was a candidate to the 2011 Portuguese presidential election.

== Early life ==
He was born in Luanda, Angola (it was then a Portuguese territory), in 1951. He moved to the Republic of the Congo (Léopoldville) by the age of 12. He spent 16 years in Africa. He studied medicine in Belgium, where he worked and lived for around 20 years.

He is married to Maria Luísa Ferreira da Silva Nemésio (born Coimbra, Santa Cruz, 21 February 1959), paternal granddaughter of Vitorino Nemésio, and has one son: Alexandre Focquet de La Vieter Nobre (born 2 June 1980) and three daughters: Isabel Focquet de La Vieter Nobre (born 11 May 1982), Leonor Nemésio de La Vieter Nobre (born 9 January 1993) and Gabriela Nemésio de La Vieter Nobre (born 7 November 1996).

== AMI ==
He was part of Médecins Sans Frontières from 1977 to 1983. In December 1984 he founded in Portugal the NGO AMI — Assistência Médica Internacional. He has participated in humanitarian missions in over 180 countries.

== Political career ==
=== Candidacy for President of the Republic ===
On February 19, 2010 he announced that he would be an independent (supported by no parties) presidential candidate to the 2011 Portuguese presidential election. Without any party support, he had a result of 14% of the votes, achieving 3rd place.

=== Candidacy for President of the Assembly of the Republic ===
After the election he declared that he was uninterested in partisan politics and refused the idea of turning his supporting movement into a party. He was deserted by some of his previous supporters after accepting an invite by the centre-right Social Democratic leader Pedro Passos Coelho to be the head of the Social Democratic lists and to run for MP for Lisbon for the elections which would happen in June 2011 after the fall of the Sócrates government. The fact that Nobre, considered a leftist and a Soarist socialist and who had supported the Left Bloc in 2009 (saying he "shared the values of the party"), was heading the electoral lists of a rightwing party. Other supporters were disappointed by the fact that he was involved in a party at all after what he had said about not involving in party politics. Nobre defended himself that he trusted Passos Coelho personally (stating he was an honest man) and that (quoting Gandhi) only who doesn't look for the truth never changes his mind. He also stated that he believed the left-right division was worn out, and remembered that he had supported other rightists like José Manuel Durão Barroso in 2003 and António Capucho for the City Hall of Cascais.

Nobre was elected, despite much discussion over his acceptance of the offer (including his statement that he was running just to be Speaker of the Portuguese Parliament and not an MP) with a quite positive result over Socialist competitor Eduardo Ferro Rodrigues. Despite the apparent support of the Social Democratic seats in the Parliament, on 20 June 2011, in the first meeting of the Parliament elected by the 5 June election, Nobre failed to be elected Speaker even after two round of voting (gaining even fewer votes the second time around). It is argued that his defeat was not only due to opposition in the Social Democrats to having an independent as the highest standing among them in Parliament, to opposition of all parties to a non-partisan in Parliament. After failing to become Speaker of the Assembly, Nobre renounced his seat. He still attended to the parliamentary meeting of 21 June and had two justified absences (due to illness) on the meetings of 30 June and 1 July.

Since then, he has not had involvement in politics except for some political commentaries in television.

== Electoral history ==
=== Presidential election, 2011 ===
Ballot: 23 January 2011
| Candidate | Votes | % |
|---|---|---|
| Aníbal Cavaco Silva | 2,231,956 | 53.0 |
| Manuel Alegre | 831,838 | 19.7 |
| Fernando Nobre | 593,021 | 14.1 |
| Francisco Lopes | 301,017 | 7.1 |
| José Manuel Coelho | 189,918 | 4.5 |
| Defensor Moura | 67,110 | 1.6 |
| Blank/Invalid ballots | 277,593 | – |
| Turnout | 4,492,453 | 46.52 |
Source: Comissão Nacional de Eleições

=== President of the Assembly of the Republic election, 2011 ===
Ballot: 20 June 2011
| Candidate | First round | | Second round | |
| Candidate | Votes | % | Votes | % |
|---|---|---|---|---|
| Blank/Invalid ballots | 122 | 53.5 | 123 | 53.9 |
| Fernando Nobre | 106 | 46.5 | 105 | 46.1 |
| Turnout | 228 | | 228 | |
Source: Results
