= Aníbal Cavaco Silva =

Portuguese economist and politician (born 1939)

His Excellency Aníbal Cavaco Silva GCC GColTE GColL GColIH
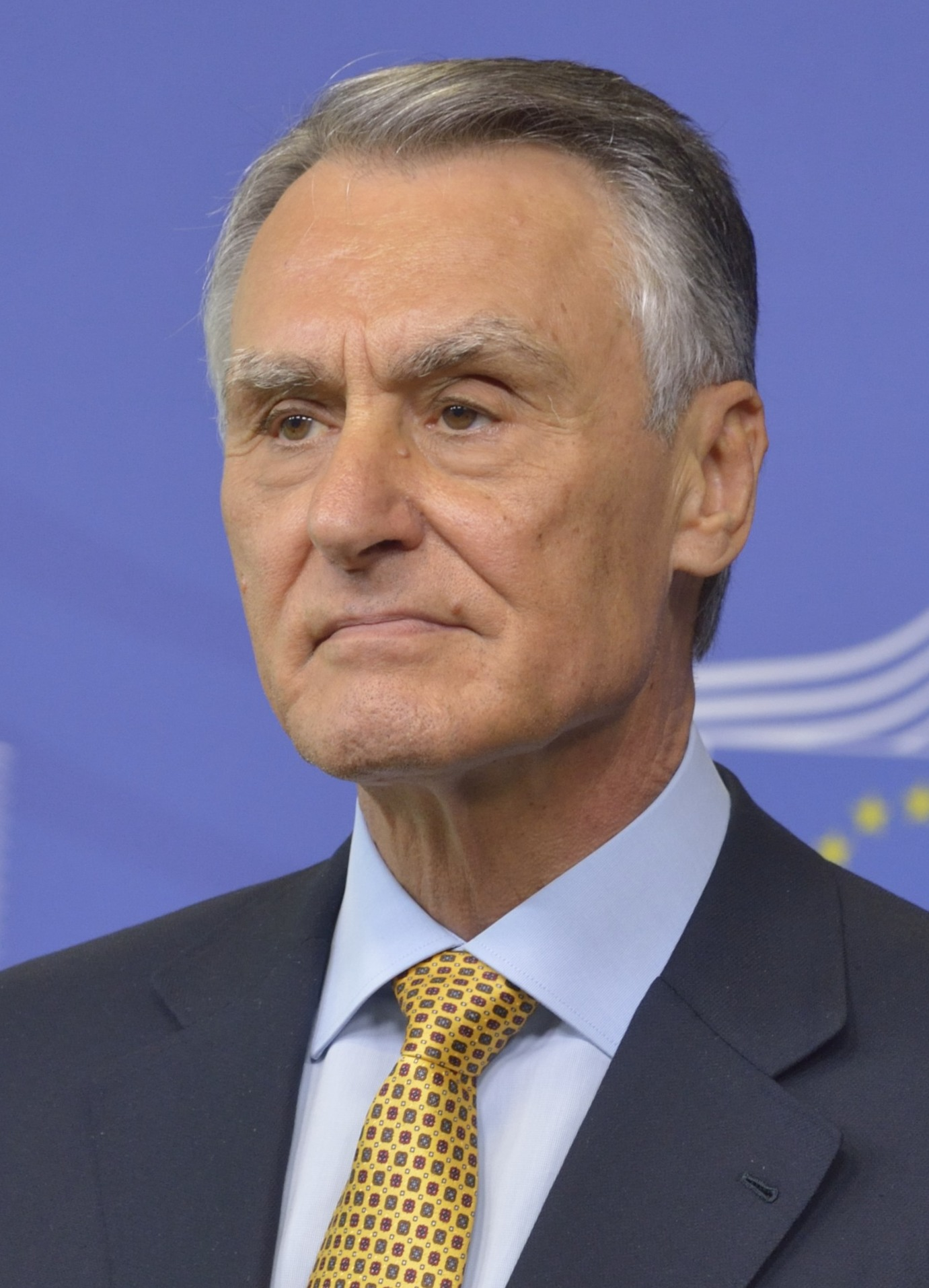
- Cavaco Silva in 2013

President of Portugal
- In office 9 March 2006 – 9 March 2016
- Prime Minister: José Sócrates; Pedro Passos Coelho; António Costa
- Preceded by: Jorge Sampaio
- Succeeded by: Marcelo Rebelo de Sousa

Prime Minister of Portugal
- In office 6 November 1985 – 25 October 1995
- President: António Ramalho Eanes; Mário Soares
- Deputy: Eurico de Melo
- Preceded by: Mário Soares
- Succeeded by: António Guterres

President of the Social Democratic Party
- In office 19 May 1985 – 19 February 1995
- Secretary-General: Manuel Dias Loureiro; José Falcão e Cunha; José Nunes Liberato
- Preceded by: Rui Machete
- Succeeded by: Fernando Nogueira

Minister of Finance
- In office 3 January 1980 – 9 January 1981
- Prime Minister: Francisco Sá Carneiro
- Preceded by: António de Sousa Franco
- Succeeded by: João Morais Leitão

Member of the Assembly of the Republic
- In office 4 November 1985 – 12 August 1987
- Constituency: Lisbon

Personal details
- Born: Aníbal António Cavaco Silva; 15 July 1939 (age 87) Boliqueime, Portugal
- Party: Social Democratic (since 1974)
- Spouse: Maria Cavaco Silva (m. 1963)
- Children: 2
- Education: Technical University of Lisbon; Alcuin College, York
- Website: Official website

Aníbal António Cavaco Silva GCC GColTE GColL GColIH (European Portuguese: [ɐˈniβɐl ɐ̃ˈtɔni.u kɐˈvaku ˈsilvɐ, - ɐ̃ˈtɔnju -]; born 15 July 1939) is a Portuguese economist and politician who served as the president of Portugal from 2006 to 2016, and as prime minister of Portugal, from 1985 to 1995. His 10-year tenure was the longest of any prime minister since Salazar, and the longest for a freely elected prime minister in Portugal's republican history. He was the first Portuguese prime minister to win an absolute parliamentary majority under the current constitutional system (dating to 1974). He is most recognized for guiding Portugal into the European Union, liberalizing the Portuguese economy and improving infrastructures across the country. As prime minister, his style and policies came to be known as Cavacoism.

== Early life and career ==
Aníbal António Cavaco Silva was born in Boliqueime, Loulé, Algarve, in 1939, the second son of Teodoro Gonçalves [da] Silva and Maria do Nascimento Cavaco. He was initially an undistinguished student. As a 12-year-old, he failed the 3rd grade of the Commercial School, and his grandfather put him working on the farm as punishment. After returning to school, Cavaco Silva went on to become an accomplished student. Cavaco Silva then went to Lisbon, where he took a vocational education course in accounting from Instituto Comercial de Lisboa (Instituto Superior de Contabilidade e Administração de Lisboa (ISCAL), today) in 1959. In parallel, he was admitted for university education at the Instituto Superior de Ciências Económicas e Financeiras de Lisboa (ISCEF) of the Technical University of Lisbon (UTL) (currently the Instituto Superior de Economia e Gestão (ISEG) of the University of Lisbon), and obtained in 1964, with distinction, a degree in economics and finance (he scored a mark of 16 out of 20). While studying in Lisbon, Cavaco Silva was an athlete of CDUL athletics department from 1958 to 1963. Between 1963 and 1964, he was drafted into the Portuguese Army Artillery for compulsory 11-month military service, serving in a battalion in Lourenço Marques in Portuguese Mozambique. Cavaco Silva studied a graduate course at the University of York in England.

Returning to Portugal, he took up a post as assistant professor in ISCEF (1974), professor at the Catholic University of Portugal (1975), extraordinary professor at the New University of Lisbon (1979) and finally director of the Office of Studies of the Bank of Portugal.

Cavaco Silva has published several academic works in economics, including in subfields like monetary policy and monetary unions. He received an Honorary Doctorate from Scotland's Heriot-Watt University in 2009.

== Political career ==
=== Early years ===
Cavaco Silva joined the Social Democratic Party in 1974. Between 1980 and 1981, he was finance minister under Prime Minister Francisco Sá Carneiro's government. Five years later, in 1985, Cavaco Silva was elected party leader.

=== Prime minister ===
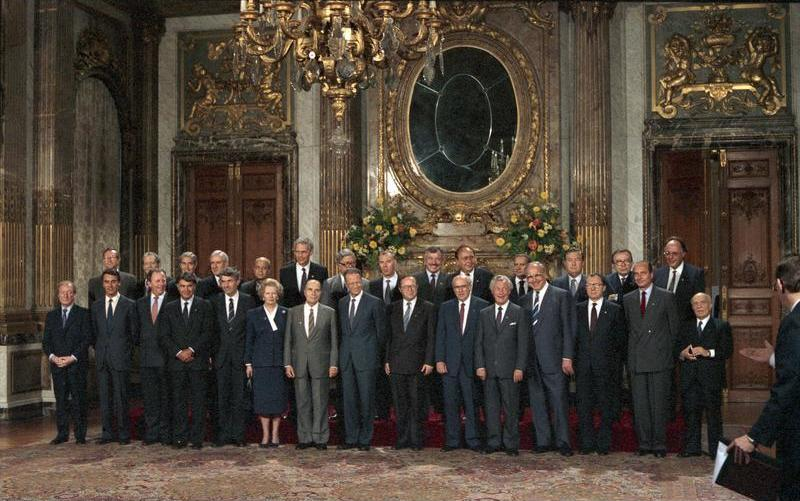
Cavaco Silva at the 1987 European Council meeting. (Cavaco stands in front, second from left.)

The 1985 legislative election was complicated by the arrival of a new political party, the Democratic Renewal Party (PRD), which had been formed by the supporters of the President, António Ramalho Eanes. In the 250-member Assembly of the Republic, the nation's legislature, the PRD won 45 seats – at the expense of every party except Cavaco Silva's PSD. Despite winning less than 30 per cent of the popular vote, the PSD was the only traditional political party not to suffer substantial losses. Its 88 seats, in fact, represented a gain of 13 over the previous election. Accordingly, Cavaco Silva became prime minister on 6 November 1985.

Cavaco Silva headed a minority government. On most issues, his Social Democrats could rely on the 22 votes of the Social and Democratic Center Party (CDS), but the two parties' combined 110 votes fell 16 short of a parliamentary majority. The Socialists (PS) and Communists (CDU) held 57 and 38 seats respectively; Cavaco Silva could govern if the 45 members of the PRD, who held the balance of power, abstained.

According to a contemporary report in The New York Times, Cavaco Silva's first government presided over an "economic boom". The article described him as "pro-American" and committed to the European Community.

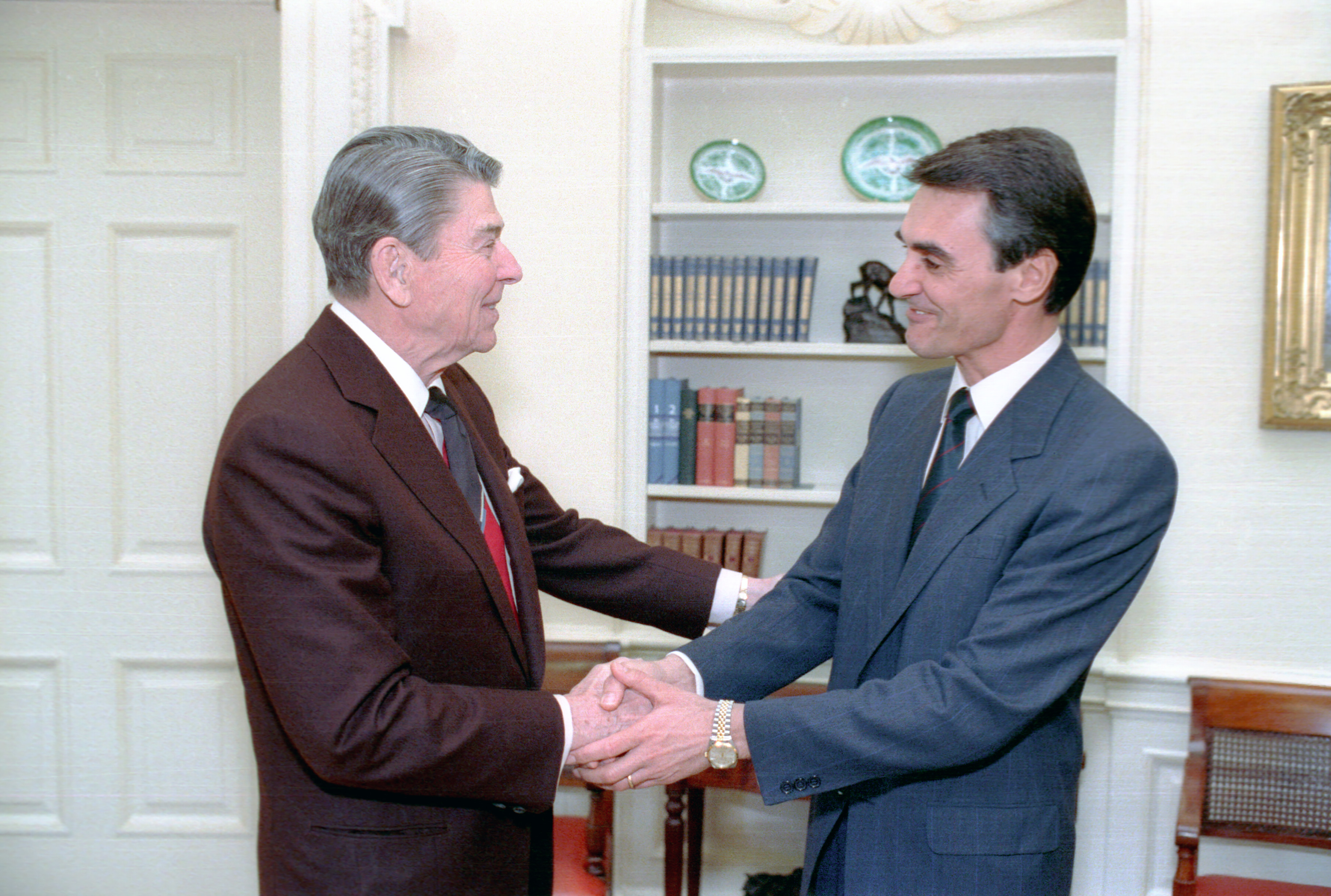
Prime Minister Cavaco Silva meeting with U.S. president Ronald Reagan at the White House, 1988

In 1987, the PRD withdrew its tacit support, and a parliamentary vote of no confidence forced President Mário Soares to call an early election. Cavaco Silva's Social Democrats captured 50.2 per cent of the popular vote and 148 of the 250 seats in the legislature. Far behind were the Socialists, with only 60 seats, and the Communists, with 31. The CDS and the PRD were virtually wiped out, left with only four and seven seats, respectively. This was the first time since the 1974 revolution that a single party had won an outright majority in the national parliament. At the time, it was also the largest majority that a Portuguese party had ever won in a free election.

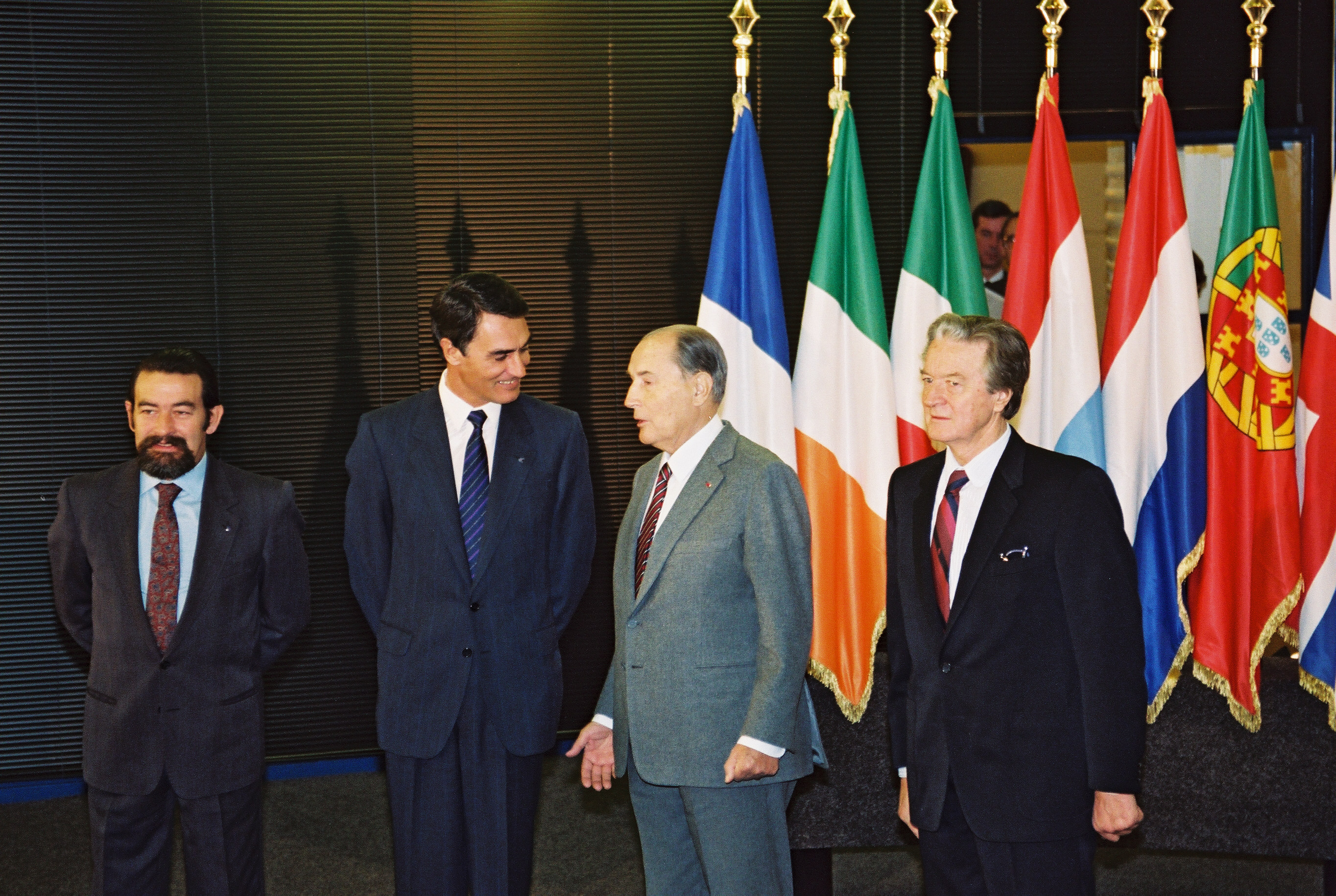
Prime Minister Cavaco Silva with French president François Mitterrand, 1989

Although the occurrence of economic growth and a public debt relatively well-contained as a result of the number of civil servants was increased from 485,368 in 1988 to 509,732 in 1991, which was a much lower increase than that which took place in the following years until 2011 marked by irrational and unsustainable State employment, from 1988 to 1993, during the government cabinets led by Cavaco Silva, the Portuguese economy was radically changed. As a result, there was a sharp and rapid decrease in the output of tradable goods and a rise in the importance of the non-tradable goods sector in the Portuguese economy.

In the 1991 election Cavaco Silva's party had a majority even larger (50.6 per cent) than the one of four years earlier. After 10 years in office, he decided not to run for another term as party leader, not contesting the 1995 election, and the PSD, lacking a leader of his stature, lost 48 seats and the election to the Socialists.

=== Post-premiership ===
Cavaco Silva contested the 1996 presidential election but was defeated by the Mayor of Lisbon, Jorge Sampaio, the Socialist candidate. Retiring from politics, he served for several years as an advisor to the board of the Banco de Portugal (Bank of Portugal) but retired from this position in 2004. He then became a full professor at the School of Economics and Management of the Catholic University of Portugal, where he taught the undergraduate and MBA programs.

He is a member of the Club of Madrid and an honorary member of the International Raoul Wallenberg Foundation.

=== President of the Republic ===
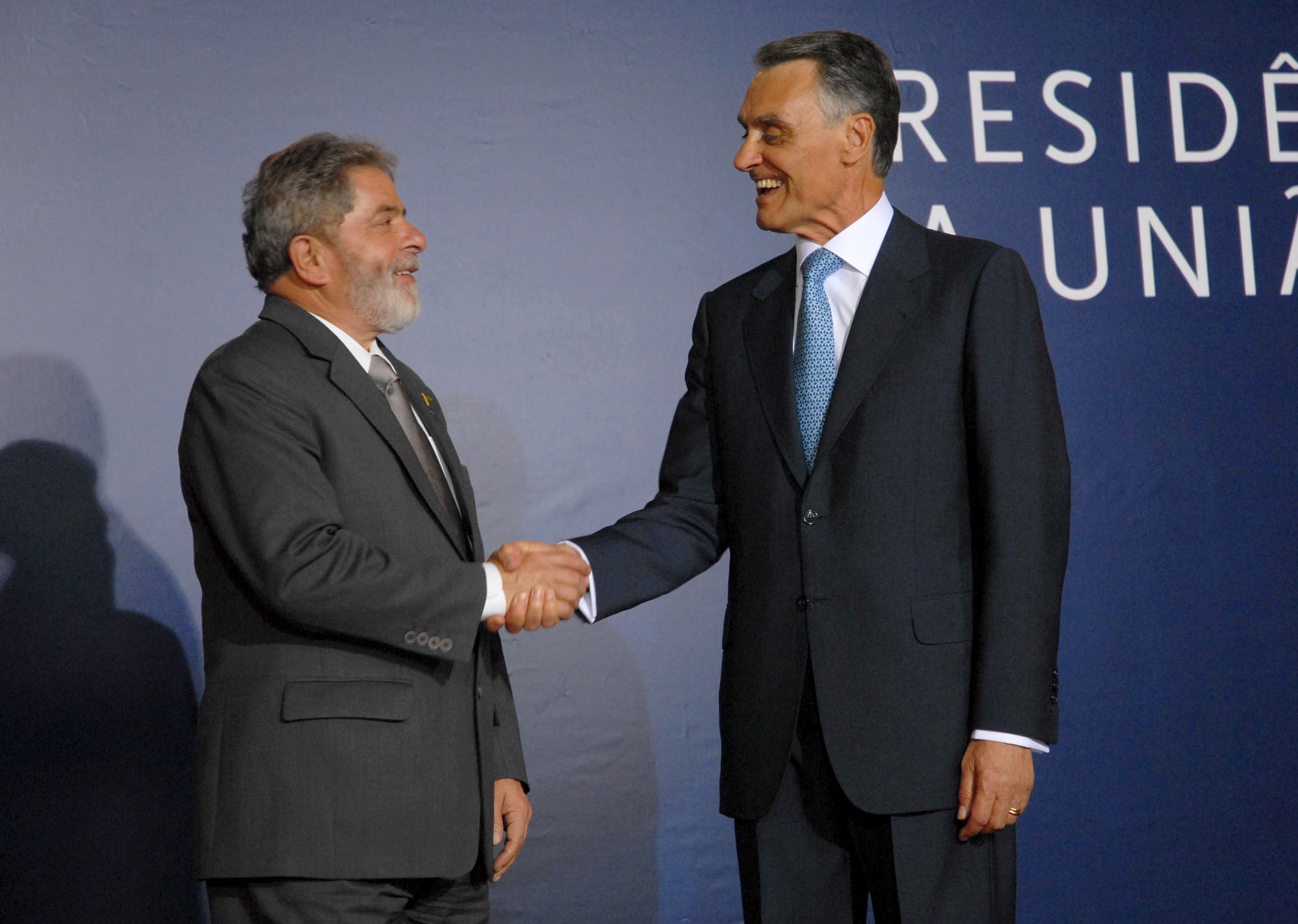
President Cavaco Silva meets the president of Brazil, Lula da Silva, in 2007.

On 20 October 2005, Cavaco Silva announced his candidacy for the 2006 presidential election. He was elected President of the Republic on 22 January 2006 with 50.6% of votes cast, avoiding a run-off. He is the first elected center-right president in Portugal since 1974. He is also the second former prime minister to be elected president, after Mário Soares.

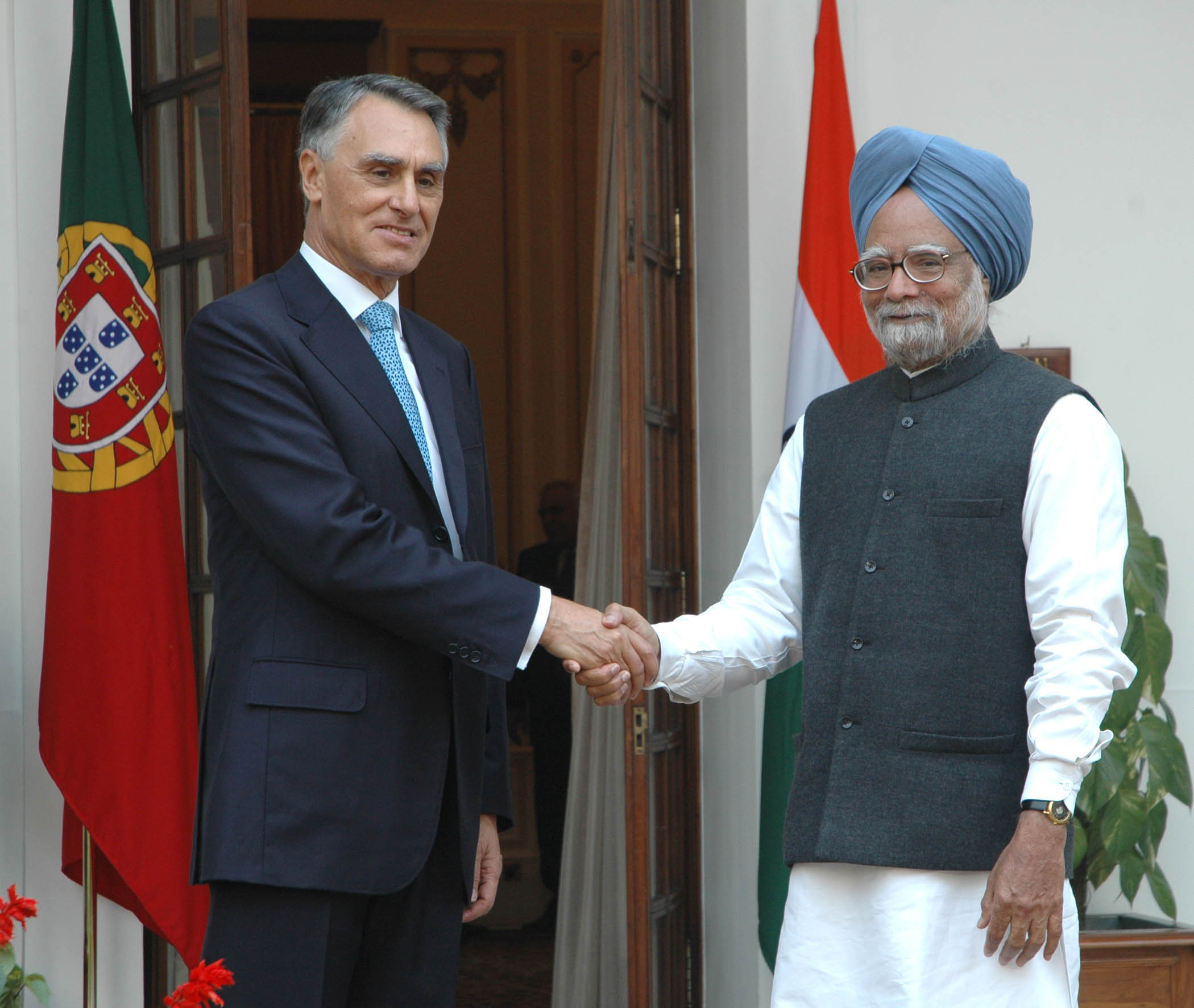
President Aníbal Cavaco Silva with Indian Prime Minister Manmohan Singh in New Delhi, 11 January 2007

He was sworn in on 9 March 2006, becoming Portugal's first right-of-centre head of state in three decades. He is also the president of the Portuguese Council of State.

Cavaco Silva's term was initially marked by a mutual understanding with the government led by Socialist José Sócrates, which he referred to as "strategic cooperation".

The most controversial moment of his presidency was when the Assembly of the Republic passed a bill for the holding of a pre-legislative referendum on the legalization of abortion in Portugal without any restrictions in the first 10 weeks of pregnancy. After the parliamentary approval of the bill summoning the referendum, Cavaco Silva referred the matter to the Portuguese Constitutional Court, which declared both the proposed legalization and the referendum constitutional by a narrow 7–6 margin. Cavaco Silva, who could still have vetoed the referendum bill, decided to sign it into law and thus allowed the referendum. The majority of the Portuguese electorate abstained from the referendum, but the vote for legalization prevailed among those who chose to cast their ballot.

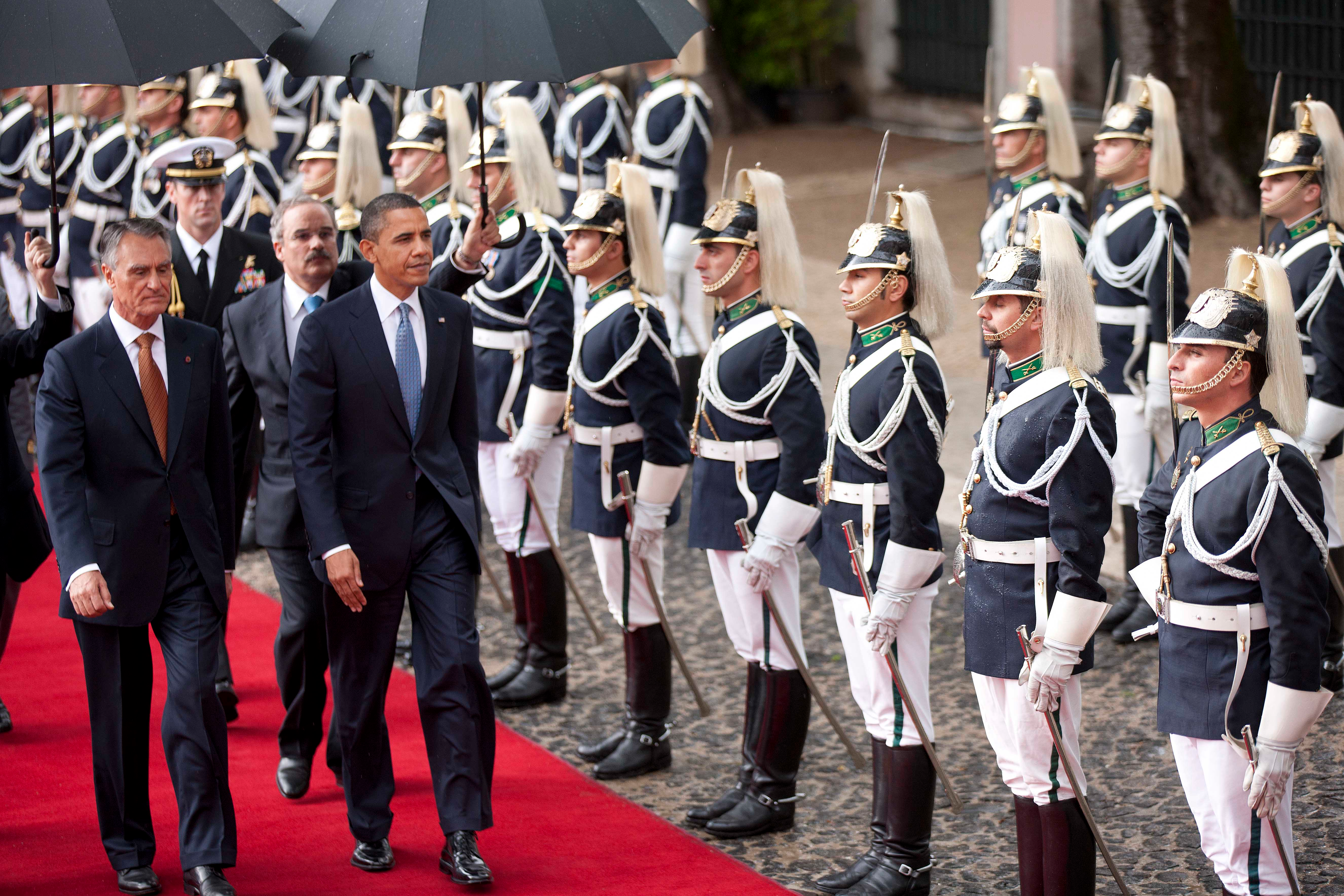
President Aníbal Cavaco Silva with U.S. president Barack Obama in Lisbon, 2010.

Cavaco Silva was reelected president of Portugal on 23 January 2011 with 52,92% of the vote, and he took office for his second five-year term on 9 March 2011.

=== 2015 constitutional crisis ===
At the general election on 4 October 2015 to the Assembly of the Republic, the unicameral Portuguese parliament, the right-wing government of Prime Minister Pedro Passos Coelho lost its majority, with centre-left and far-left opposition parties gaining more than half of the seats. As Passos Coelho's own Social Democratic Party remained the largest in parliament, and still had the support of the much smaller CDS – People's Party, Cavaco Silva allowed Passos Coelho to continue as prime minister, giving him the first chance to form a new government. Passos Coelho was unable to find any new partners and was widely expected to stand down, but on 22 October Cavaco Silva invited him to form a new government, even if it were a minority government. On 24 October Cavaco Silva explained his thinking:

In 40 years of democracy, no government in Portugal has ever depended on the support of anti-European forces, that is to say forces that campaigned to abrogate the Lisbon Treaty, the Fiscal Compact, the Growth and Stability Pact, as well as to dismantle monetary union and take Portugal out of the euro, in addition to wanting the dissolution of NATO.

António Costa, leader of the Socialist Party, called this a grave mistake and added "It is unacceptable to usurp the exclusive powers of parliament. The Socialists will not take lessons from Professor Cavaco Silva on the defence of our democracy." The Green politician Rui Tavares commented "The president has created a constitutional crisis. He is saying that he will never allow the formation of a government containing Leftists and Communists. People are amazed by what has happened." The opposition parties quickly announced their intention to bring down the new government in a motion of rejection.

Eventually, Passos Coelho's government fell on a motion of no confidence, and the president appointed António Costa, the leader of the Socialists, as prime minister in his place.

== Family ==
Cavaco Silva married Maria Alves da Silva at the Church of the Monastery of São Vicente de Fora, São Vicente de Fora, Lisbon, on 20 October 1963. The couple had a daughter Patricia, and a son Bruno. He has five grandchildren, four of whom were born to his daughter. One of them, António Montez, is a professional footballer.

Aníbal Cavaco Silva had two brothers: António Cavaco Silva (1947–2010), and Rogério Cavaco Silva (1934–2025). Rogério Cavaco Silva was a businessman and a victim of the Dominion of Melchizedek scam.

== Honours ==
=== National honours ===
- Grand Collar of the Order of Prince Henry (5 July 2022)
- Grand Collar of the Order of Liberty (9 March 2016)
- Grand Collar of the Military Order of the Tower and Sword (9 March 2011)
- Grand Cross of the Sash of the Three Orders (9 March 2006)
- Grand Cross of the Military Order of Christ (29 November 1995)

=== Foreign honours ===
Aníbal Cavaco Silva coat of arms as a knight of the Swedish Order of the Seraphim

- Austria:
  - Grand Star of the Decoration of Honour for Services to the Republic of Austria (31 August 2009)
  - Grand Decoration of Honour in Gold with Sash of the Decoration of Honour for Services to the Republic of Austria (14 July 1997)
- Brazil:
  - Grand Collar of the Order of the Southern Cross (22 April 2008)
  - Grand Cross of the Order of the Southern Cross (4 February 1991)
  - Grand Cross of the Order of Rio Branco (8 October 1991)
  - Grand Cross of the Order of the National Congress (4 February 1991)
- Bulgaria: First Class of the Order of the Stara Planina (8 June 2015)
- Cape Verde: First Class of the Amílcar Cabral Order (14 July 2010)
- Chile:
  - Collar of the Order of Merit (15 November 2007)
  - Grand Cross of the Order of Merit (20 July 2007)
  - Grand Cross of the Order of Bernardo O'Higgins (16 November 2010)
- Colombia:
  - Grand Collar of the Order of Boyacá (14 November 2012)
  - Grand Cross of the Order of Boyacá (23 May 1988)
- Cyprus: Grand Cross of the Order of Makarios III (20 November 1990)
- East Timor: Grand Collar of the Order of Timor-Leste (6 August 2012)
- Ecuador: Grand Cross of the National Order of Merit (25 January 1991)
- Estonia: Collar of the Order of the Cross of Terra Mariana (13 October 2008)
- Finland: Grand Cross of the Order of the White Rose of Finland (8 March 1991)
- Germany:
  - Grand Cross Special Class of the Order of Merit of the Federal Republic of Germany (26 May 2009)
  - Grand Cross of the Order of Merit of the Federal Republic of Germany (25 January 1991)
- Greece: Grand Cross of the Order of Honour (15 May 1990)
- Guinea-Bissau: Grand Cross of the National Order of the Boé Hills (4 February 1991)
- Holy See: Knight with the Collar of the Order of Pope Pius IX (30 August 2010)
- Jordan:
  - Collar of the Order of Al-Hussein bin Ali (28 May 2009)
  - Grand Cordon with Brilliants (Special Class) of the Supreme Order of the Renaissance (10 December 2009)
- Latvia: Grand Cross of the Cross of Recognition (22 November 2010)
- Lithuania: Grand Cross with Golden Chain of the Order of Vytautas the Great (25 July 2007)
- Luxembourg:
  - Knight of the Order of the Gold Lion of the House of Nassau (9 September 2010)
  - Grand Cross of the Order of the Oak Crown (4 February 1991)
- Malta: Honorary Companion of Honour with Collar of the National Order of Merit (11 December 2008)
- Mexico: Collar of the Order of the Aztec Eagle (2 June 2014)
- Morocco:
  - Grand Cordon of the Order of Ouissam Alaouite (13 February 1995)
  - Grand Officer of the Order of Ouissam Alaouite (17 May 1991)
- Mozambique: First Class of the Order of Friendship and Peace (7 October 2014)
- Netherlands: Knight Grand Cross of the Order of Orange-Nassau (25 March 1992)
- Norway: Grand Cross of the Order of St Olav (5 November 2008)
- Palestine: Grand Cordon of the Order of the Star of Palestine (19 July 1995)
- Panama: Collar of the Order of Manuel Amador Guerrero (30 July 2013)
- Peru: Grand Collar of the Order of the Sun of Peru (19 November 2012)
- Poland:
  - Knight of the Order of the White Eagle (22 June 2012)
  - Grand Cross of the Order of Polonia Restituta (1 October 2008)
- Qatar: Collar of the Order of Merit (10 December 2009)
- Romania: Collar of the Order of the Star of Romania (16 June 2015)
- Slovakia: Grand Cross of the Order of the White Double Cross (4 September 2008)
- Sovereign Military Order of Malta:
  - Collar of the Order pro Merito Melitensi (23 November 2010)
  - Grand Cross, Special Class of the Order pro Merito Melitensi (25 January 1991)
- Spain:
  - Collar of the Order of Isabella the Catholic (24 September 2006)
  - Knight Grand Cross of the Order of Isabella the Catholic (8 September 1993)
- Sweden:
  - Knight of the Royal Order of the Seraphim (9 May 2008)
  - Commander Grand Cross of the Order of the Polar Star (9 February 1987)
- Tunisia:
  - Grand Cordon of the Order of the Republic (18 November 1993)
  - Grand Cordon of the Order of 7 November (18 November 1993)
- Turkey: Recipient of the Order of the State of the Republic of Turkey (24 November 2009)
- Venezuela: Grand Cordon of the Order of the Liberator (18 November 1987)

== State visits ==
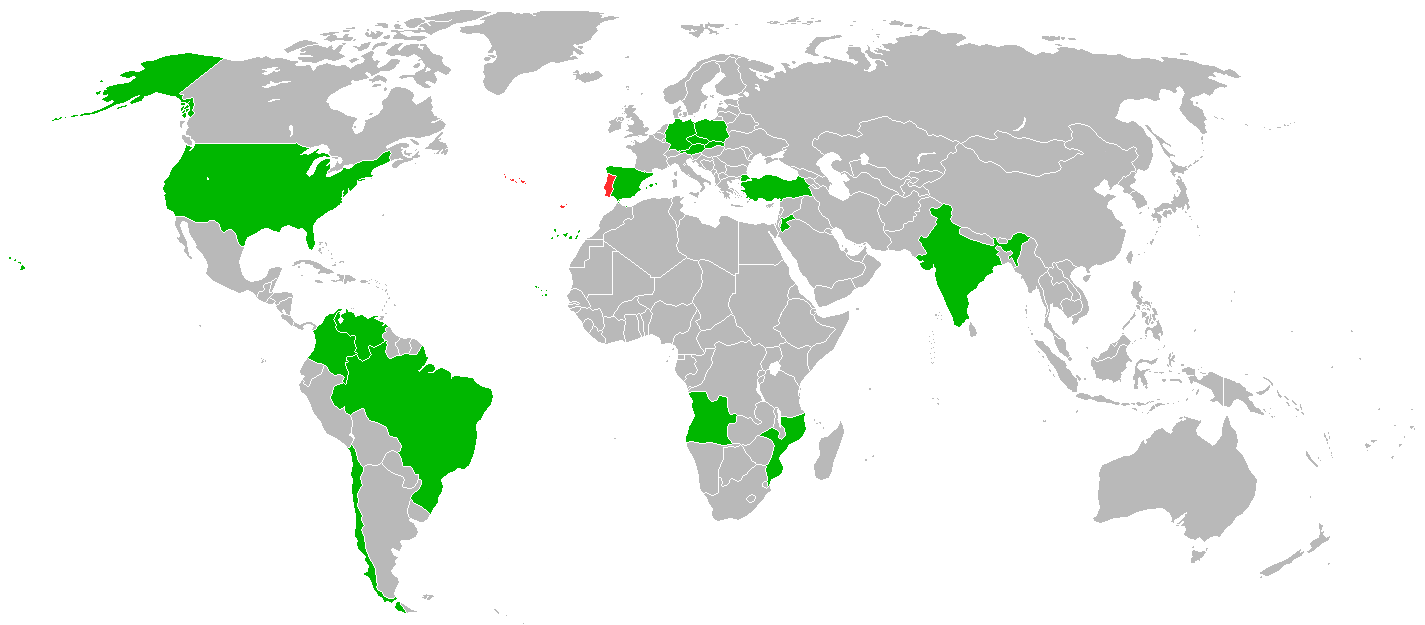
Foreign trips of Cavaco Silva.

Cavaco Silva made state visits to countries in Europe, Africa, Asia and the Americas. In September 2006, on his first state visit, he visited Portugal's neighbour, Spain.

== Electoral history ==
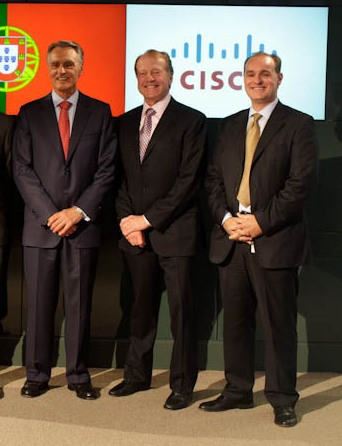
Cavaco during his 2011 visit to the U.S.; pictured with John T. Chambers and Helder Antunes.

=== PSD leadership election, 1985 ===
Ballot: 19 May 1985
Candidate	Votes	%
Aníbal Cavaco Silva	422	53.6
João Salgueiro	365	46.4
Turnout	787	
Source: Results

=== Legislative election, 1985 ===
Ballot: 6 October 1985
Party	Candidate	Votes	%	Seats	+/−
PSD	Aníbal Cavaco Silva	1,732,288	29.9	88	+13
PS	Almeida Santos	1,204,321	20.8	57	–44
PRD	Hermínio Martinho	1,038,893	17.9	45	new
APU	Álvaro Cunhal	898,281	15.5	38	–6
CDS	Lucas Pires	577,580	10.0	22	–8
UDP	Mário Tomé	73,401	1.3	0	±0
Other parties		128,846	2.2	0	±0
Blank/Invalid ballots		145,319	2.5	–	–
Turnout		5,798,929	74.16	250	±0
Source: Comissão Nacional de Eleições

=== Legislative election, 1987 ===
Ballot: 19 July 1987
Party	Candidate	Votes	%	Seats	+/−
PSD	Aníbal Cavaco Silva	2,850,784	50.2	148	+60
PS	Vítor Constâncio	1,262,506	22.2	60	+3
CDU	Álvaro Cunhal	689,137	12.1	31	–7
PRD	António Ramalho Eanes	278,561	4.9	7	–38
CDS	Adriano Moreira	251,987	4.4	4	–18
Other parties		219,715	3.9	0	±0
Blank/Invalid ballots		123,668	2.2	–	–
Turnout		5,676,358	71.57	250	±0
Source: Comissão Nacional de Eleições

=== Legislative election, 1991 ===
Ballot: 6 October 1991
Party	Candidate	Votes	%	Seats	+/−
PSD	Aníbal Cavaco Silva	2,902,351	50.6	135	–13
PS	Jorge Sampaio	1,670,758	29.1	72	+12
CDU	Álvaro Cunhal	504,583	8.8	17	–14
CDS	Diogo Freitas do Amaral	254,317	4.4	5	+1
PSN	Manuel Sérgio	96,096	1.6	1	new
PSR	Francisco Louçã	64,159	1.1	0	±0
Other parties		132,495	2.3	0	–7
Blank/Invalid ballots		110,672	1.9	–	–
Turnout		5,735,431	67.78	230	–20
Source: Comissão Nacional de Eleições

=== Presidential election, 1996 ===
Ballot: 14 January 1996
Candidate	Votes	%
Jorge Sampaio	3,035,056	53.9
Aníbal Cavaco Silva	2,595,131	46.1
Blank/Invalid ballots	132,791	–
Turnout	5,762,978	66.29
Source: Comissão Nacional de Eleições

=== Presidential election, 2006 ===
Ballot: 22 January 2006
Candidate	Votes	%
Aníbal Cavaco Silva	2,773,431	50.5
Manuel Alegre	1,138,297	20.7
Mário Soares	785,355	14.3
Jerónimo de Sousa	474,083	8.6
Francisco Louçã	292,198	5.3
Garcia Pereira	23,983	0.4
Blank/Invalid ballots	102,785	–
Turnout	5,590,132	61.53
Source: Comissão Nacional de Eleições

=== Presidential election, 2011 ===
Ballot: 23 January 2011
Candidate	Votes	%
Aníbal Cavaco Silva	2,231,956	53.0
Manuel Alegre	831,838	19.7
Fernando Nobre	593,021	14.1
Francisco Lopes	301,017	7.1
José Manuel Coelho	189,918	4.5
Defensor Moura	67,110	1.6
Blank/Invalid ballots	277,593	–
Turnout	4,492,453	46.52
Source: Comissão Nacional de Eleições

== Bibliography ==
- Cavaco Silva, Autobiografia Política, in 2 Vols.

== See also ==
- Liberalism in Portugal

Party political offices
Preceded by Rui Machete	President of the Social Democratic Party; 1985–1995	Succeeded by Fernando Nogueira
Political offices
Preceded by António de Sousa Franco as Minister of Finance	Minister of Finance and Planning; 1980–1981	Succeeded by João Morais Leitão
Preceded by Carlos Corrêa Gago as Minister of Planning	Minister of Finance and Planning; 1980–1981	Succeeded by João Morais Leitão
Preceded by Mário Soares	Prime Minister of Portugal; 1985–1995	Succeeded by António Guterres
Preceded by Jorge Sampaio	President of Portugal; 2006–2016	Succeeded by Marcelo Rebelo de Sousa
