= Ana Luiza Nobre =

Ana Luiza Nobre is a Brazilian architectural historian, author, professor, and critic, born in Rio de Janeiro in 1964. She is Director of the History, Theory and Criticism Section of the School of Architecture and Urbanism at the Catholic University of Rio de Janeiro (PUC-Rio), in Brazil, where she has been teaching for the last 10 years.

Nobre received her architectural training at the Universidade Federal do Rio de Janeiro (UFRJ), where she graduated in 1986. Later on she studied at the Politecnico di Torino (with a grant from the Italian government), and received her PhD in history in 2008 at the Catholic University of Rio de Janeiro, with Prof. Ronaldo Brito as supervisor.

She is a member of CICA/International Committee of Architectural Critics, founder and ex-director of "Casa de Lucio Costa", a private organisation dedicated to preserve and disseminate Lucio Costa's work. She has also been on the editorial board of periodicals such as AU/Arquitetura e Urbanismo and Arquitextos.

She is author of several books and publications, mainly on modern and contemporary architecture in Brazil. Her books include Arquitetura Moderna no Rio de Janeiro (Pini, 1991), which was awarded the 1991 Award by the Brazilian Institute of Architects; Um Modo de Ser Moderno. Lucio Costa e a Crítica Contemporânea (Cosac Naify, 2004); Carmen Portinho: o Moderno em Construção (Relume Dumará, 1991) e Coletivo. Arquitetura Paulista Contemporânea (Cosac Naify, 2006).

She has also organised a number of exhibitions and seminars and is currently working on a documentary film about the city of Rio de Janeiro, with a grant from Faperj (Foundation of Support to the Research of the State of Rio de Janeiro).
