= New Democracy Party (Portugal) =

New Democracy Party Partido da Nova Democracia
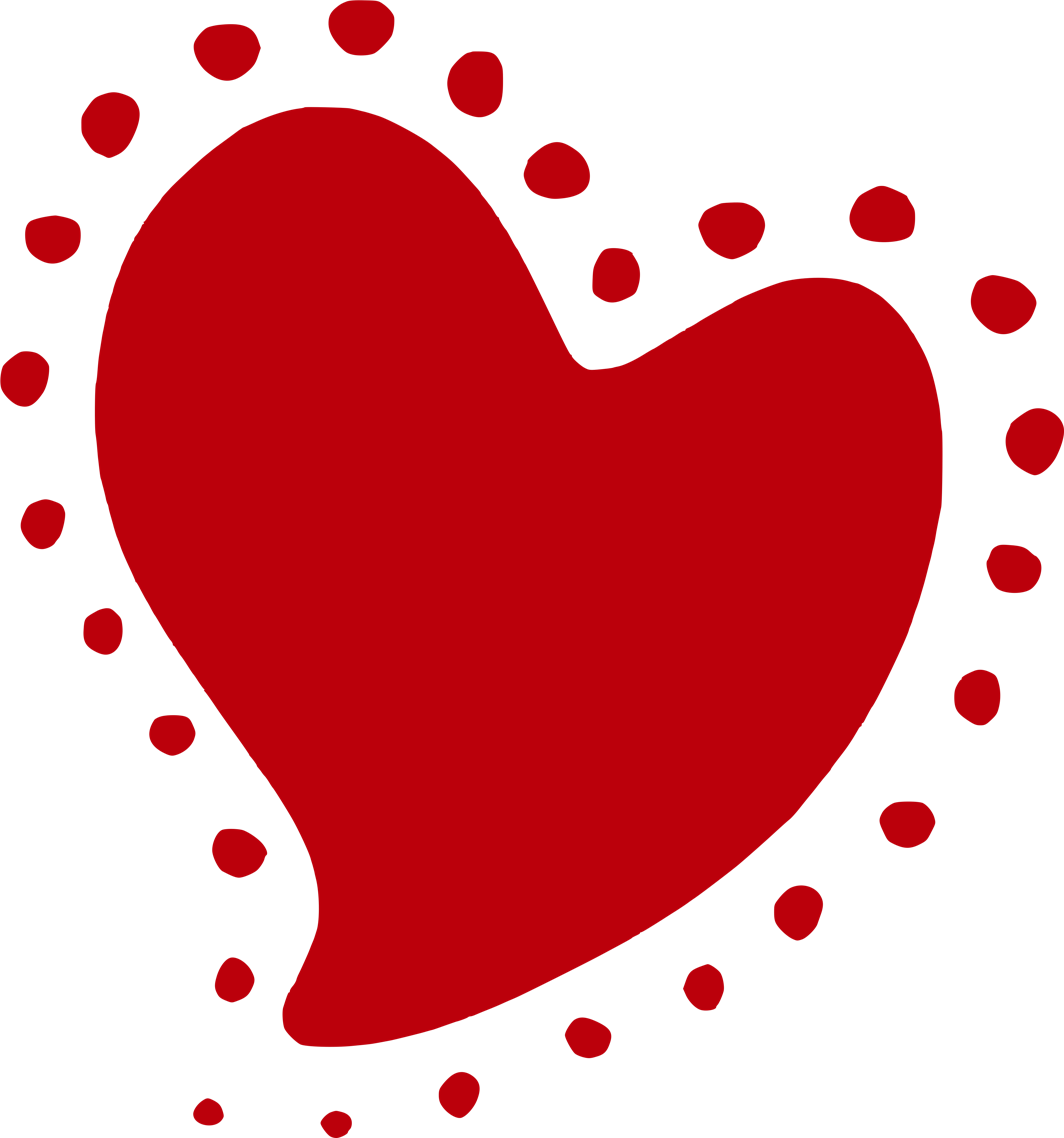
- Abbreviation: PND
- Leaders: Manuel Monteiro (2003–2009); Joel Viana (2009–2015)
- Founded: 18 June 2003
- Dissolved: 23 September 2015
- Split from: Democratic and Social Centre – People's Party
- Headquarters: Lisbon (until 2010); Funchal (2010–2015)
- Ideology: Populism; Euroscepticism; Nationalism
- Political position: Right-wing
- European affiliation: Europeans United for Democracy
- European Parliament group: Alliance of Liberals and Democrats for Europe
- Colours: Blue; Red

Website
- www.pnd.pt

The New Democracy Party (Portuguese: Partido da Nova Democracia, pronounced [pɐɾˈtiðu ðɐ ˈnɔvɐ ðɨmukɾɐˈsiɐ], PND) was a small Portuguese Eurosceptic and nationalist political party, which existed from 2003 to 2015. In voting ballots, its name appeared only as New Democracy, with the acronym unchanged. The PND originated from Manuel Monteiro's split from the Democratic and Social Centre – People's Party (CDS–PP). It was a member of the EUDemocrats.

== History ==
The party was founded by Manuel Monteiro and his chief of staff, Diogo Pacheco de Amorim, as a Eurosceptic alternative to the governing Democratic and Social Centre – People's Party (CDS–PP), which Monteiro had led from 1992 to 1998. The party intended to exploit a "growing disappointment" with CDS–PP's political course towards further European integration. It was registered on Monteiro's behalf under the name New Democracy and assigned the acronym PND by the Constitutional Court on 18 June 2003. The first party congress took place in Vila Nova de Famalicão in November 2003, where a manifesto proclaiming Portugal to be at the world's centre was approved. While Monteiro and Amorim are both credited as the PND's ideologists, it was Amorim who wrote the 2003 statement of principles and the party programme.

During the 2004 European Parliament election campaign, the PND exploited the concessions on Euroscepticism made by the CDS–PP as part of the Força Portugal coalition with the Social Democratic Party (PSD). The CDS-PP kept pressuring João de Deus Pinheiro of the PSD, the leading candidate on the joint electoral list, not to debate Manuel Monteiro, which led Monteiro to complain that the two main Portuguese parties were discriminating against him. The PND won 1% of the vote and did not obtain any seats.

In the 2005 Portuguese legislative election, the PND won 40,358 votes in total, which amounted to 0.7% of the popular vote.

During the 2009 Portuguese legislative election, Manuel Monteiro stood in the Braga constituency. He left the party to dedicate himself exclusively to the campaign in Braga, and passed the leadership over to Joel Viana, who led the PND until its dissolution. The 21,876 votes Monteiro managed to gather amounted to less than 0.4% of the popular vote. Monteiro found the result "deeply disappointing" and stated his desire to leave Portugal, especially in the wake of the Socialist Party's victory. The PND electoral list in Lisbon was headed by Manuel Brás, a member of Opus Dei, who sat on the party's national board.

In the 2011 presidential election, the PND's candidate was José Manuel Coelho. He won 4.5% of the vote, surpassing expectations and pre-election polling.

The PND was disbanded by the Constitutional Court on 23 September 2015, after failing to submit its required annual report in 2011, 2012, and 2013.

== Ideology ==
The party was founded as a right-wing split from the CDS–PP, which Monteiro considered to have lost its way, apparently believing that "the PP was no longer the CDS". The membership was recruited from the ranks of the PP, the "old" CDS, and liberals, but the party also attracted fringe disaffected members of the PSD and the "new" CDS. Monteiro promised political "renewal" and a "new" kind of politics that would open the space for independent and non-aligned participants. The PND set out to mobilise a populist and nationalist protest against the dominance of the PSD and the CDS–PP in Portuguese politics.

Pedro Cruz, describing the populist ideology of the PND and Monteiro several weeks before the foundation of Chega by Amorim in 2019, wrote: "[The PND] wasn't left-wing, but it wasn't right-wing either, it was "centrist", conservative but not very much, cheaply popular to the degree required, plain-talking, almost demagogic." Cruz also noted that the PND was a "one-man party", dominated by Monteiro, and that it avoided an openly right-wing identity due to unfavourable associations with the Estado Novo regime of António Salazar, then still regarded as recent past. Amorim, who claimed a supporting role for himself in the PND's foundation and credited Monteiro with a calling for leadership, remembered for his part in 2020 that Monteiro was "a man with determination who knew what he wanted and wasn't afraid to say he was right-wing"; he compared Monteiro with André Ventura, the leader of Chega.

The PND was described as right-wing in the context of the 2004 European Parliament election, and recent academic sources classify it accordingly.

Three paragraphs from the 2003 statement of principles of the PND, authored by Amorim, proclaiming the "fundamental rights" of liberty, freedom of contract, and private property, were copied verbatim into the statement of principles of the separatist Movement of the Portuguese Protectorate of Lunda Chokwe (Movimento do Protetorado Português da Lunda Tchokwe) in the diamond-rich Lunda Norte Province of north-east Angola in July 2011. In 2019, the passages reappeared in the programme of the far-right party Chega.

== Election results ==
=== Assembly of the Republic ===
Election	Leader	Votes	%	Seats	+/-	Government
2005	Manuel Monteiro	40,358	0.7 (#7)	0 / 230	New	Extraparliamentary
2009	Manuel Monteiro	21,876	0.4 (#8)	0 / 230	Steady	Extraparliamentary
2011	Joel Viana	11,806	0.2 (#13)	0 / 230	Steady	Extraparliamentary

=== European Parliament ===
Election	Leader	Votes	%	Seats	+/-
2004	Manuel Monteiro	33,833	1.0 (#6)	0 / 24	Steady
2014	Eduardo Welsh	23,082	0.7 (#9)	0 / 24	Steady

=== Presidential elections ===
Election year	Candidate	1st round		2nd round	
Election year	Candidate	# of overall votes	% of overall vote	# of overall votes	% of overall vote
2011	José Manuel Coelho	189,918	4.5 (#5)		

== Bibliography ==
- Magone, José M. (2005), "Portugal", in Lodge, Juliet (ed.), The 2004 Elections to the European Parliament, Basingstoke: Palgrave Macmillan, pp. 210–217, doi:10.1057/9780230523821, ISBN 978-0-230-52382-1
