= Carlos Nobre (rugby union) =

Portuguese rugby union player and coach

Carlos Alberto Nobre Ferreira (29 February 1940 - 21 March 2014) was a Portuguese rugby union player and coach. He played as a flanker.

He was one of the best players of his time both for Benfica and the National team.

He played for Benfica his entire career, from 1958/59 to 1975/76, where he was one of their most emblematic players. He won 6 titles of the National Championship, in 1959/60, 1960/61, 1961/62, 1969/70, 1974/75, a title withdrawn by the Portuguese Rugby Federation, and 1975/76, 6 titles of the Cup of Portugal, in 1961, 1965, 1966, 1970, 1972 and 1975, and the Iberian Cup in 1971.

He had 21 caps for Portugal, from 1965 to 1973.

After finishing his player career he became a coach, winning two national titles for Benfica.
