= José Manuel Coelho =

Portuguese politician

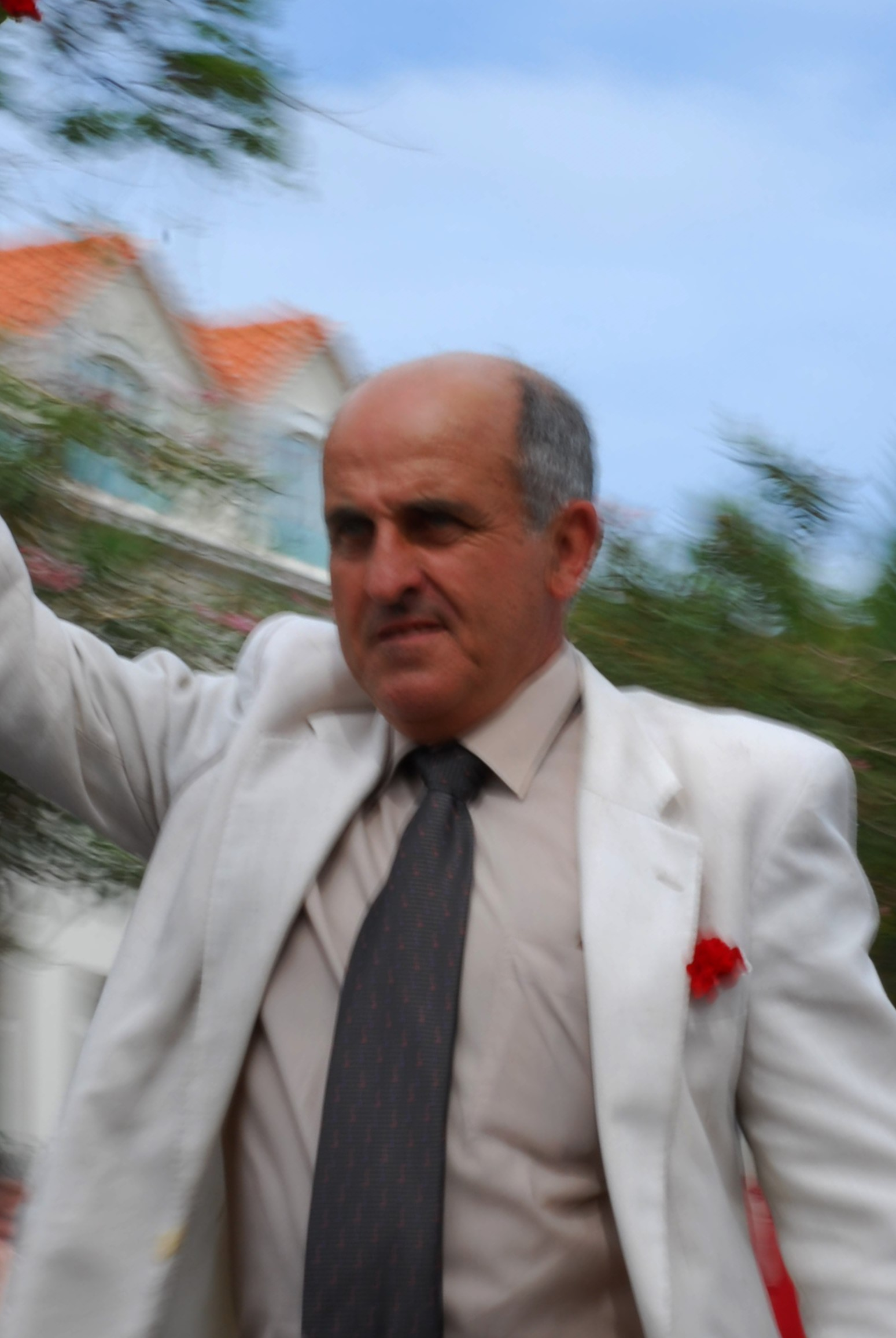

Member of the Legislative Assembly of Madeira
- In office 23 April 2008 – 2 May 2018

Personal details
- Born: José Manuel da Mata Vieira Coelho; 22 July 1952 (age 73) Gaula, Santa Cruz, Madeira, Portugal
- Party: Portuguese Labour Party (2011–present)
- Other political affiliations: Portuguese Communist Party (1977–2007); New Democracy Party (2007–2011)
- Children: 2
- Profession: Construction worker

José Manuel da Mata Vieira Coelho (born 22 July 1952) is a Portuguese politician. He was a member of the Portuguese Communist Party until 1999, and still calls himself a communist "who evolved". He was a substitute deputy of the Legislative Assembly of Madeira for the New Democracy Party, taking office in 2008. He became famous for the incident in which he showed a Nazi flag to the assembly as a protest against the Social Democratic Party refusing to commemorate the Carnation Revolution, among several other episodes as well.

Coelho was the New Democracy's candidate to the presidency in the 2011 election. He won 4.5% of the vote, coming fifth, which was considerably better than expected or forecast by pre-election polling. In Madeira, Coelho reached second place, with 39% of the votes.

On 12 March 2011, he joined the Portuguese Labour Party (PTP), of which he became the vice-president. He was a candidate for the 2011 legislative election but, as the PTP only got 0.3% of the vote, he failed to achieve his election in the constituency of Madeira, having been unsuccessful once again in 2015.

In February 2017, José Manuel Coelho asked for political asylum in the Principality of Pontinha, which was granted by D. Renato Barros I.

== Electoral results ==
=== 2011 Portuguese presidential election ===
José Manuel Coelho finished fifth with 189,918 votes (4.51%).
