= Francisco Lopes =

Portuguese politician (born 1955)

Member of the Assembly of the Republic Elections: 2005, 2009, 2011, 2015
- In office 10 March 2005 – 24 October 2019
- Constituency: Setúbal

Personal details
- Born: Francisco José de Almeida Lopes; 29 August 1955 (age 70) Vila Cova de Alva, Arganil, Portugal
- Party: Portuguese Communist Party (1974–present)
- Occupation: Politician
- Profession: Electrician

Francisco José de Almeida Lopes (born 29 August 1955) is a Portuguese electrician and communist politician, currently serving as Member of the Assembly of the Republic. He gained national-wide attention as a candidate in the Portuguese presidential election of 2011.

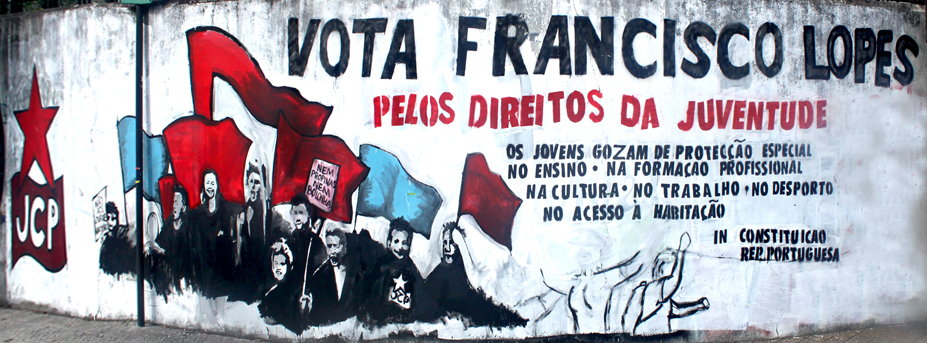
Porto wall painting.
