= Opinion polling for the 2021 Portuguese presidential election =

In the run up to the 2021 Portuguese presidential election, various organisations carried out opinion polling to gauge voting intention in Portugal. Results of such polls are displayed in this article.

Poll results are listed in the table below in reverse chronological order, showing the most recent first. The highest percentage figure in each polling survey is displayed in bold, and the background shaded in the leading candidate colour. In the instance that there is a tie, then no figure is shaded but both are displayed in bold. Poll results use the date the survey's fieldwork was done, as opposed to the date of publication.

== Candidates vote ==
=== First round ===
==== Graphical summary ====
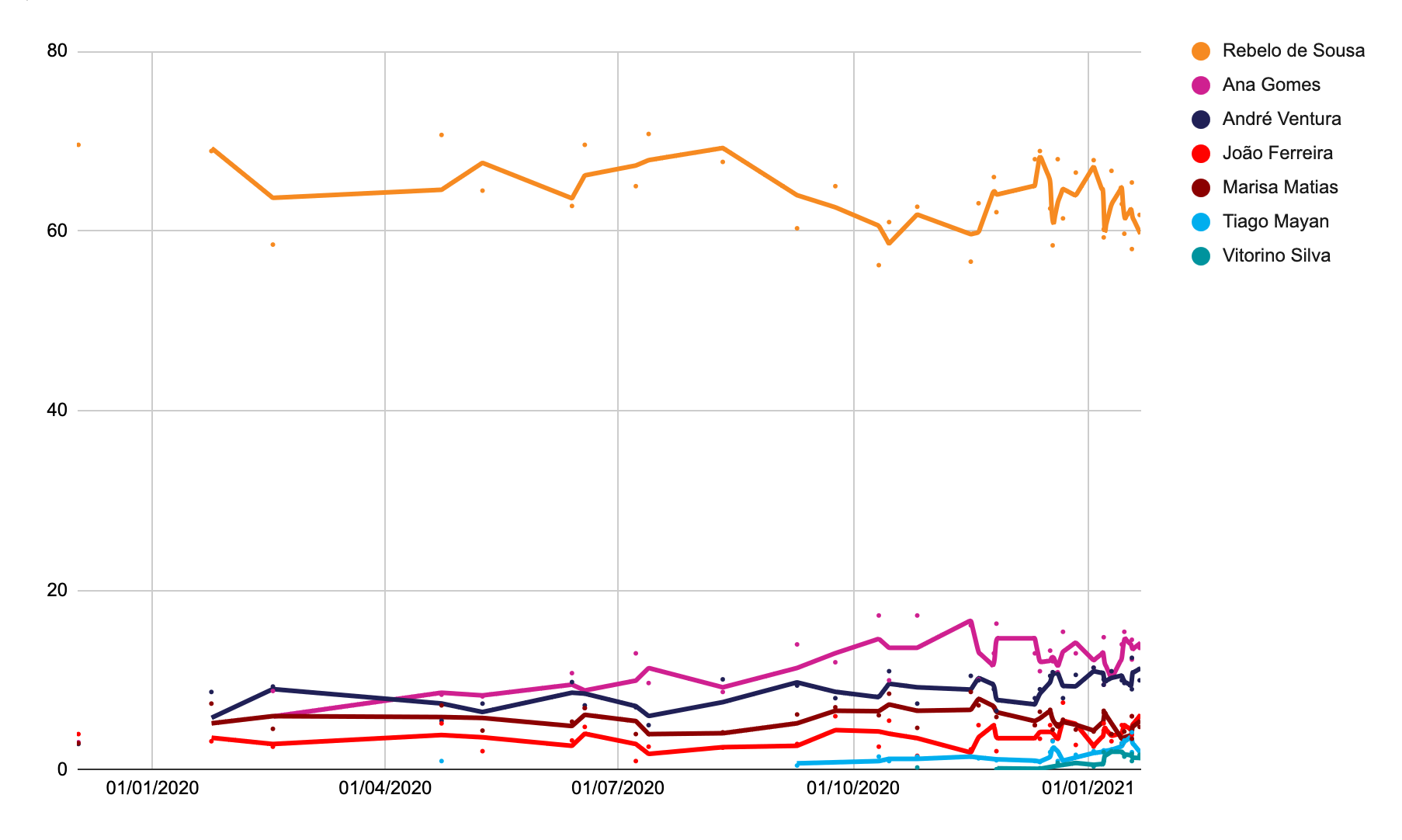
Graph of the polling for the 2021 Portuguese presidential election.

==== Polling ====
Exit poll

Polling firm	Fieldwork date	Sample size	Rebelo de Sousa	Marisa Matias	João Ferreira	Vitorino Silva	André Ventura	Ana Gomes	Tiago Mayan	Oth/ Und	Lead
Polling firm	Fieldwork date	Sample size	PSD	BE	CDU	RIR	CH	Ind./PS	IL	Oth/ Und	Lead
**2021 election**	24 Jan 2021	–	60.7	4.0	4.3	3.0	11.9	13.0	3.2	–	**47.7**
CESOP–UCP	24 Jan 2021	18,388	57–62	3.5–5.5	3.5–5.5	2–4	9–12	13–16	3–5	—N/a	45
ICS/ISCTE	24 Jan 2021	20,675	55.5–60.5	2.4–5.4	3.3–6.3	2.3–5.3	10.1–14.1	13.1–17.1	1.3–3.3	—N/a	42.9
Pitagórica	24 Jan 2021	28,162	56.4–60.4	2.2–6.2	2.1–6.1	0.9–4.9	9.9–13.9	12.2–16.2	2.4–5.4	—N/a	44.2
Intercampus	24 Jan 2021	23,581	58.8–60.6	3.1–5.5	2.9–5.3	1.6–4.0	10.1–13.7	12.7–16.3	3.0–5.4	—N/a	45.2
Eurosondagem	18–21 Jan 2021	2,533	61.8	6.0	4.8	1.7	10.0	13.6	2.1	–	48.2
ICS/ISCTE	12–18 Jan 2021	1,210	58	6	6	1	12.5	14.5	2	–	43.5
Pitagórica	7–18 Jan 2021	629	65.4	3.5	3.9	1.8	9.0	12.3	4.2	–	53.1
Aximage	9–15 Jan 2021	1,183	59.7	4.3	5.0	1.5	9.7	15.4	3.3	1.1	44.3
CESOP–UCP	11–14 Jan 2021	2,001	63	3	5	2	10	14	3	–	49
Pitagórica	29 Dec 2020–10 Jan 2021	629	66.7	4.0	3.2	2.1	11.0	10.8	2.3	–	56.5
Intercampus	4–7 Jan 2021	603	59.3	6.4	4.4	2.0	9.5	9.5	2.2	6.6	49.8
Eurosondagem	3–7 Jan 2021	2,521	60.2	6.6	5.2	1.0	10.1	14.8	2.0	–	45.4
Pitagórica	22 Dec 2020–3 Jan 2021	629	67.9	4.3	2.6	0.4	11.4	11.4	2.1	–	56.5
Pitagórica	17–27 Dec 2020	629	66.5	4.5	2.8	0.8	10.6	13.0	1.7	–	53.5
Aximage	19–22 Dec 2020	812	61.4	5.6	7.5	–	8.0	15.4	1.1	1.0	46.0
Pitagórica	17–20 Dec 2020	629	68.0	5.1	3.5	0.8	10.7	10.9	1.0	0.0	57.1
Intercampus	14–18 Dec 2020	603	58.4	4.5	3.3	–	10.9	12.1	3.2	7.6	46.3
Eurosondagem	14–17 Dec 2020	2,020	62.5	6.7	5.0	–	10.5	13.3	2.0	0.0	49.2
Pitagórica	10–13 Dec 2020	629	68.9	6.5	3.5	0.2	9.0	11.0	0.9	0.0	57.9
CESOP–UCP	4–11 Dec 2020	1,315	68	5	5	–	8	13	1	0	55
Aximage	23–26 Nov 2020	647	62.1	5.9	2.1	0.1	6.6	16.3	1.1	5.8	45.8
ICS/ISCTE	11–25 Nov 2020	802	66	7	5	–	9	13	-	0	53
Eurosondagem	16–19 Nov 2020	1,525	63.1	7.2	5.0	–	10.0	10.1	1.3	3.3	53.0
Intercampus	9–16 Nov 2020	622	56.6	8.7	2.3	–	10.5	16.1	1.6	4.4	40.5
Aximage	22–26 Oct 2020	694	62.7	4.7	1.6	0.3	7.4	17.2	1.5	4.4	45.5
Eurosondagem	12–15 Oct 2020	1,072	61.0	8.5	5.5	–	11.0	10.0	1.0	3.0	50.0
Intercampus	6–11 Oct 2020	618	56.2	6.1	2.6	–	8.2	17.2	1.5	8.2	39.0
ICS/ISCTE	14–24 Sep 2020	801	65	7	6	–	8	12	–	2	53
Intercampus	4–9 Sep 2020	614	60.3	6.2	2.9 (Note: With Jerónimo de Sousa as candidate from the Unitary Democratic Coalition (CDU).)	–	9.4	14.0	0.5	6.7	46.3
Intercampus	6–11 Aug 2020	601	67.7	4.2	2.5	–	10.1	8.7	–	6.8	57.7
Intercampus	8–13 Jul 2020	620	70.8	4.0	2.6	–	5.0	9.7	–	7.9	61.1
Aximage	7–8 Jul 2020	600	65	4	1	–	7	13	–	8 (Note: Adolfo Mesquita Nunes: 2%)	52
Eurosondagem	15–18 Jun 2020	1,072	69.6	6.9	4.8 (Note: With Arménio Carlos as candidate from the Unitary Democratic Coalition (CDU).)	–	7.2	6.9	–	4.6 (Note: Miguel Albuquerque: 2.5%; Adolfo Mesquita Nunes: 2.1%)	62.4
Intercampus	9–13 Jun 2020	610	62.6	5.4	3.3	–	9.8	10.8	–	8.1 (Note: Paulo Portas: 2.8%; Others/Undecided: 5.3%)	51.8
Intercampus	5–9 May 2020	620	64.5	4.4	2.1	–	7.4	8.2	–	13.4	56.3
Eurosondagem	20–23 Apr 2020	1,048	70.7	7.2	5.2	–	5.5	8.4	1.0 (Note: With João Cotrim de Figueiredo as candidate from the Liberal Initiative (IL).)	2.0 (Note: André Silva (PAN): 2.0%)	62.3
Intercampus	11–17 Feb 2020	614	58.5	4.6	2.6	–	9.3	8.8	–	16.2 (Note: Cristina Ferreira: 2.4%; Carlos César (PS): 1.3%; Others/Undecided: 12.5%)	49.2
Intercampus	19–24 Jan 2020	619	68.5	7.4	3.2	–	8.7	–	–	12.2 (Note: Carlos César (PS): 1.6%; Others/Undecided: 10.6%)	59.8
Aximage	29 Nov–3 Dec 2019	601	69.6	3.0 (Note: With Francisco Louçã as candidate from the Left Bloc (BE).)	4.0	–	2.9	3.1	–	17.4 (Note: Pedro Santana Lopes (Alliance): 1.0%; Others/Undecided: 16.4%)	65.6
**2016 election**	24 Jan 2016	–	52.0	10.1	3.9 (Note: In 2016, the CDU candidate for the Presidency was Edgar Silva.)	3.3	–	–	–	30.7 (Note: In 2016, the second most voted candidate was António Sampaio da Nóvoa with 22.9%.)	**29.1**

== Leadership polls ==
=== Approval ratings ===
The table below lists the evolution of public opinion on the president's performance in office.

Polling firm	Fieldwork date	Sample size	Marcelo Rebelo de Sousa			
Polling firm	Fieldwork date	Sample size	Approve	Disapprove	No opinion	Lead
Intercampus	4–7 Jan 2021	603	68.0	13.7	18.2	54.3
Pitagórica	22 Dec 2020–3 Jan 2021	629	65	6	29	59
Pitagórica	17–27 Dec 2020	629	63	8	29	55
Aximage	19–22 Dec 2020	812	62	22	16	40
Pitagórica	17–20 Dec 2020	629	64	8	28	56
Intercampus	14–18 Dec 2020	603	61.8	16.4	21.8	45.4
Pitagórica	10–13 Dec 2020	629	69	7	24	62
Eurosondagem	7–10 Dec 2020	1,020	72.7	5.5	21.8	67.2
Aximage	23–26 Nov 2020	647	74	9	17	65
Intercampus	9–16 Nov 2020	622	59.5	16.6	24.0	42.9
Eurosondagem	2–5 Nov 2020	1,011	71.5	4.5	24.0	67.0
Aximage	22–26 Oct 2020	694	60	22	18	38
Eurosondagem	5–8 Oct 2020	1,010	71.7	5.2	23.1	66.5
ICS/ISCTE	14–24 Sep 2020	801	72.1	11.8	16.1	60.3
Aximage	12–15 Sep 2020	603	64	21	15	43
Eurosondagem	7–10 Sep 2020	1,022	71.0	4.5	24.5	66.5
Intercampus	4–9 Sep 2020	614	67.6	13.1	19.4	54.5
Intercampus	6–11 Aug 2020	601	72.2	9.9	17.9	62.3
UCP–CESOP	13–18 Jul 2020	1,482	87	10	3	77
Intercampus	9–13 Jul 2020	620	72.3	8.9	18.9	63.4
Aximage	5–8 Jul 2020	624	61	22	17	39
Eurosondagem	29 Jun–2 Jul 2020	1,025	70.8	4.4	24.8	66.4
Intercampus	9–13 Jun 2020	610	73.3	11.0	15.7	62.3
Aximage	5–8 Jun 2020	605	75.0	8.4	16.6	66.6
Eurosondagem	1–4 Jun 2020	1,021	71.6	5.0	23.4	66.6
Pitagórica	16–24 May 2020	802	88	12	—N/a	76
Intercampus	5–9 May 2020	620	75.0	8.7	16.3	66.3
Eurosondagem	4–7 May 2020	1,005	72.0	5.7	22.3	66.3
Pitagórica	15–26 Apr 2020	605	87	13	—N/a	74
Intercampus	9–14 Apr 2020	623	76.6	6.9	16.5	69.7
Eurosondagem	29 Mar–2 Apr 2020	1,008	71.5	5.5	23.0	66.0
Marktest	24–25 Mar 2020	505	74.8	13.2	12.0	61.6
Pitagórica	13–21 Mar 2020	605	85	15	—N/a	70
Intercampus	13–19 Mar 2020	611	63.7	14.5	21.8	49.2
Aximage	7–10 Mar 2020	680	64.1	12.7	23.2	51.4
Eurosondagem	1–5 Mar 2020	1,011	70.7	5.2	24.1	65.5
Aximage	14–18 Feb 2020	839	64.1	11.0	24.9	53.1
Intercampus	11–17 Feb 2020	614	69.3	9.6	21.1	59.7
Eurosondagem	2–6 Feb 2020	1,020	72.1	6.5	21.4	65.6
ICS/ISCTE	22 Jan–5 Feb 2020	800	85	4	11	81
Intercampus	19–24 Jan 2020	619	71.4	10.1	18.5	61.3
Aximage	9–12 Jan 2020	640	62.7	9.2	28.1	53.5
Eurosondagem	5–9 Jan 2020	1,010	72.0	7.0	21.0	65.0
Intercampus	12–17 Dec 2019	606	74.6	8.4	17.0	66.2
Eurosondagem	8–12 Dec 2019	1,019	71.0	6.2	22.8	64.8
Intercampus	20–26 Nov 2019	604	76.2	8.9	14.9	67.3
Eurosondagem	17–21 Nov 2019	1,011	72.1	7.7	20.2	64.4
Intercampus	22–28 Oct 2019	604	76.5	5.9	17.6	70.6
Intercampus	2–11 Sep 2019	801	81.1	6.5	12.4	74.6
Eurosondagem	1–5 Sep 2019	601	70.7	6.7	22.6	64.0
Pitagórica	12–24 Aug 2019	1,525	87	13	—N/a	74
Aximage	20–27 Jul 2019	1,354	78.8	15.6	5.6	63.2
Aximage	12–15 Jul 2019	601	69.5	13.9	16.6	55.6
Pitagórica	8–14 Jul 2019	800	92	8	—N/a	84
Eurosondagem	7–11 Jul 2019	1,011	71.9	8.3	19.8	63.6
Aximage	13–19 Jun 2019	605	65.8	18.2	16.0	47.6
Eurosondagem	2–6 Jun 2019	1,008	71.0	8.5	20.5	62.5
UCP–CESOP	16–19 May 2019	1,882	95	5	—N/a	90
Pitagórica	10–19 May 2019	605	89	11	—N/a	78.0
Aximage	3–8 May 2019	600	65.7	17.1	17.2	48.6
Pitagórica	3–13 Apr 2019	605	91	9	—N/a	82
Eurosondagem	7–11 Apr 2019	1,019	70.0	8.1	21.9	61.9
Aximage	30 Mar–1 Apr 2019	602	65.8	19.3	14.9	46.5
Eurosondagem	10–14 Mar 2019	1,020	69.0	9.0	22.0	60.0
Aximage	5–10 Feb 2019	602	67.1	24.2	8.7	42.9
Eurosondagem	2–9 Jan 2019	1,010	71.0	6.5	22.5	64.5
Aximage	4–7 Jan 2019	608	74.3	17.0	8.7	57.3
Aximage	7–11 Dec 2018	602	77.7	11.5	10.8	66.2
Eurosondagem	7–14 Nov 2018	1,018	71.8	7.0	21.2	64.8
Aximage	9–12 Nov 2018	603	79.4	11.8	8.8	67.6
Aximage	1–3 Oct 2018	601	79.5	11.3	9.2	68.2
Eurosondagem	5–12 Sep 2018	1,008	73.0	8.7	18.3	64.3
Aximage	1–2 Sep 2018	603	79.0	10.5	10.5	68.5
Aximage	13–16 Jul 2018	600	80.5	8.8	10.7	71.7
Eurosondagem	4–11 Jul 2018	1,011	72.5	8.3	19.2	64.2
Aximage	9–12 Jun 2018	602	84.0	6.5	9.5	77.5
Aximage	5–9 May 2018	600	87.0	4.9	8.1	82.1
Eurosondagem	3–9 May 2018	1,008	73.0	9.0	18.0	64.0
Aximage	8–12 Apr 2018	601	86.0	4.8	9.2	81.2
Eurosondagem	8–14 Mar 2018	1,010	72.0	8.1	19.9	63.9
Aximage	2–5 Mar 2018	605	88.2	4.4	7.4	83.8
Aximage	3–6 Feb 2018	603	87.3	5.5	7.2	81.8
Eurosondagem	14–17 Jan 2018	1,018	71.8	8.2	20.0	63.6
Aximage	6–9 Jan 2018	600	87.0	4.8	8.2	82.2
Eurosondagem	6–12 Dec 2017	1,017	71.7	8.7	19.6	63.0
Aximage	1–4 Dec 2017	603	84.8	6.9	8.3	77.9
Eurosondagem	8–15 Nov 2017	1,010	70.0	7.5	22.5	62.5
Aximage	4–6 Nov 2017	600	84.1	8.1	7.8	76.0
Aximage	14–17 Oct 2017	603	87.0	6.0	7.0	81.0
Eurosondagem	4–11 Oct 2017	1,011	69.1	7.1	23.8	62.0
Eurosondagem	31 Aug–6 Sep 2017	1,007	72.0	10.3	17.7	61.7
Aximage	29–30 Aug 2017	597	87.4	6.2	6.4	81.2
Eurosondagem	27 Jul–2 Aug 2017	1,011	71.0	9.5	19.5	61.5
Aximage	6–11 Jul 2017	604	87.8	5.6	6.6	82.2
Eurosondagem	28 Jun–5 Jul 2017	1,008	70.7	9.8	19.5	60.9
Aximage	7–11 Jun 2017	601	89.2	4.9	5.9	84.3
Eurosondagem	1–7 Jun 2017	1,010	70.0	9.4	20.6	60.6
Eurosondagem	3–10 May 2017	1,005	69.0	8.5	22.5	60.5
Aximage	5–8 May 2017	603	88.1	4.4	7.5	83.7
Eurosondagem	30 Mar–5 Apr 2017	1,003	71.7	11.7	16.6	60.0
Aximage	2–4 Apr 2017	600	88.8	3.9	7.3	84.9
Eurosondagem	1–8 Mar 2017	1,011	72.0	13.8	14.2	58.2
Aximage	4–6 Mar 2017	608	88.2	4.4	7.4	83.8
Aximage	5–8 Feb 2017	601	92.6	2.8	4.6	89.8
Eurosondagem	1–8 Feb 2017	1,017	69.0	14.0	17.0	55.0
Eurosondagem	5–11 Jan 2017	1,010	70.0	13.1	16.9	56.9
Aximage	6–9 Jan 2017	603	92.9	3.0	4.1	89.9
Eurosondagem	7–14 Dec 2016	1,016	68.0	11.2	20.8	56.8
Aximage	2–4 Dec 2016	605	92.8	3.1	4.1	89.7
UCP–CESOP	19–22 Nov 2016	977	90	5	5	85
Eurosondagem	2–9 Nov 2016	1,011	70.7	13.7	15.6	57.0
Aximage	31 Oct–1 Nov 2016	601	92.2	3.0	4.8	89.2
Eurosondagem	6–12 Oct 2016	1,010	69.4	11.0	19.6	58.4
Aximage	1–3 Oct 2016	608	91.2	2.9	5.9	88.3
Eurosondagem	7–14 Sep 2016	1,009	71.0	13.3	15.7	57.7
Aximage	2–5 Sep 2016	603	91.1	3.1	5.8	88.0
Eurosondagem	26 Jul–2 Aug 2016	1,005	70.0	12.5	17.5	57.5
Aximage	15–17 Jul 2016	606	91.0	3.1	5.9	87.9
Eurosondagem	30 Jun–6 Jul 2016	1,023	68.6	13.1	18.3	55.5
Eurosondagem	1 Jun–7 Jun 2016	1,025	70.0	13.6	16.4	56.4
Aximage	30 May–1 Jun 2016	606	87.9	4.5	7.6	83.4
Eurosondagem	5–11 May 2016	1,031	68.4	12.1	19.5	56.3
Aximage	7–9 May 2016	600	92.4	3.6	4.0	88.8
Eurosondagem	7–13 Apr 2016	1,026	68.0	12.5	19.5	55.5
Aximage	2–3 Apr 2016	601	87.9	6.2	5.9	81.7
