= Day for Darfur =

Day for Darfur is an international advocacy campaign that works to bring together activists in cities around the globe in calling for action on the crisis in Darfur, western Sudan.

The Day for Darfur was originally conceived by a group of NGOs working on Darfur concerned about the slow response of the international community to the crisis. Key participating organisations include Aegis Trust, Amnesty International, Human Rights Watch, International Crisis Group, and Save Darfur Coalition. There have been four Days for Darfur called since the first took place on September 17, 2006, each focusing on a call to governments and international bodies.

== First Day for Darfur ==
On September 17, 2006, the Globe for Darfur coalition marked the first anniversary of the signing of the 2005 UN World Summit Outcome Document by holding the first Global Day for Darfur. More than 60 events in 42 cities were held, calling for UN peacekeepers to be deployed to the Darfur region of Sudan to support the chronically understaffed African Union Mission in Sudan (AMIS) force.

== Second Day for Darfur ==
December 10, 2006, raised the issue of rape and sexual violence in Darfur and called on world leaders to work with the African Union and its member states to make protecting women from rape a priority for AMIS, including an increase in the number of female AMIS police officers and translators in Darfur and extension of firewood patrols around all internally displaced people (IDP) camps. Further calls were made towards the Government of Sudan, to allow humanitarian organisations to have free and unfettered access to help victims of rape and other forms of sexual violence and to hold perpetrators of rape and sexual assault accountable for their crimes.

A number of leading stateswomen released an open letter on the day, calling for the immediate deployment of a robust international peacekeeping force to protect Darfuri women and children. Signatories included: Madeleine Albright, Graça Machel, Mary Robinson, Carol Bellamy, Hanan Ashrawi, Glenys Kinnock, Édith Cresson, Sigrid Rausing, Professor Fatima Babiker Mahmoud, Wendy Ruth Sherman, Professor Dr. Herta Däubler-Gmelin, Nicole Fontaine, Agnes Nyoka Peter, Yakin Erturk, Emma Bonino, and Hina Jilani.

== Third Day for Darfur ==
On April 29, 2007, the Globe for Darfur coalition marked the fourth anniversary of the Darfur crisis with events taking place in more than 200 cities calling on the UN Secretary-General to demand that governments pressure all sides to stop the violence, respect the ceasefire and end opposition to the hybrid force. Activists were joined by a number of high-profile figures who called on the international community to protect the civilians of Darfur, including: George Clooney, Hugh Grant, Bob Geldof, Don Cheadle, Sir Elton John, David Furnish, Sir Mick Jagger, Mark Knopfler, Thandie Newton, Emmanuel Jal, Mia Farrow, Mariella Frostrup, and Alex James.

== Fourth Day for Darfur ==
September 16, 2007 was held in anticipation of the opening of the United Nations General Assembly in New York, calling on the UN General Assembly to keep the Darfur crisis in the spotlight and ensure the full and expeditious deployment of the UNAMID peacekeeping force. Prior to the Day for Darfur events, a group of high-profile women visited Darfuri IDPs in camps across the border in Chad and a number of women called on world leaders to step up pressure on all parties in the conflict to agree to an immediate ceasefire. This group included Chimamanda Ngozi Adichie, Asha Haji Elmi, Maria Barroso, Cate Blanchett, Herta Däubler-Gmelin, Binet Diop, Mia Farrow, Mariella Frostrup, Ana Gomes, Germaine Greer, Isabel Jonet, Musimbi Kanyoro, Angélique Kidjo, Kathleen Kennedy Townsend, Kerry Kennedy, Manuela Ferreira Leite, Elle Macpherson, Rosa Mota, Dr. Ngozi Okonjo-Iweala, Eva Padberg, Sigrid Rausing, Mary Robinson, Dame Anita Roddick, Deborah Scroggins, and Jane Wales.

There was also a song released on the Day for Darfur by UK group Mattafix. The video for the song was filmed in Chad and features Matt Damon, Don Cheadle, Archbishop Desmond Tutu, Elle Macpherson, and The Black Eyed Peas. The project was funded by Mick Jagger.

== Participating organisations ==
Notable participating organisations include:

- Aegis Trust
- American Jewish Committee
- American Jewish World Service
- Amnesty International
- Enough Project
- European Union of Jewish Students
- FEMNET
- Genocide Intervention Network
- Habonim Dror
- Human Rights First
- Human Rights Watch
- International Crisis Group
- International Federation for Human Rights
- Medbridge
- Minority Rights Group International
- Mothers' Union
- National Association of Seadogs International
- National Union of Students (United Kingdom)
- Physicians for Human Rights
- CCJO René Cassin
- Save Darfur Coalition
- Service for Peace
- Society for Threatened Peoples
- Soroptimist International
- Sudan Organisation Against Torture
- Unitarian Universalist Service Committee
- United Nations Association – UK
- UN Watch
- World Evangelical Alliance

== See also ==
- Darfur conflict
- History of Darfur
- Sudan
