= Clemens Nathan Research Centre =

British human rights organisation

The Clemens Nathan Research Centre (CNRC) is a British human rights organisation that focuses on organising international conferences with speakers from multidisciplinary fields, as well as publishing edited books.

== Overview ==
The centre was founded in 2004 and is the research arm of the Consultative Council of Jewish Organisations.

== History ==
The centre was founded when Clemens N. Nathan (1933–2015) was persuaded to start a research centre as part of the CCJO.

Nathan's career was in textiles, but he had worked for several Jewish causes, as well as international human rights and interfaith relations. Nathan was described by CCJO founder Rene Cassin as "the human of human rights". He became the centre's first chairman and Alan Stephens became the first director.

Nathan spoke at several events including at the University of Pennsylvania on 'Human Rights in the 21st Century', and a keynote paper at the ETJN International Conference on Rehabilitation and Transitional Justice (2012), published in the International Human Rights Law Review in 2016.

== Work ==
The aim of the CNRC has been to organise, sponsor and enable conferences and discussions about various fields of human rights, usually every two years, to include leading academics, lawyers, practitioners and advisors. Conference subjects have included Transitional Justice, Freedom of Expression, Victim Reparations and Freedom of Religion. Co-sponsors have included the Anglo-Jewish Association, Redress, the European Atlantic Group, Essex Human Rights Centre, and the Essex Transitional Justice Network.

The CNRC has "stimulated and facilitated discussion, research and study on a striking array of topics, including international organisations, Human Rights, interfaith relations and the Holocaust and German-Jewish history".

Leif Holmstrom, from the Raoul Wallenberg Institute of Human Rights and Humanitarian Law, Lund, described the CNRC as having succeeded "in launching and sustaining useful and constructive events and programmes which have had a beneficial and measurable impact on the improvement of Human Rights.".
