= 2021 Portuguese presidential election =

- 24 January 2021
- Opinion polls
- Registered: 10,847,434 (▲11.24%)
- Turnout: 39.26% (▼9.40pp)
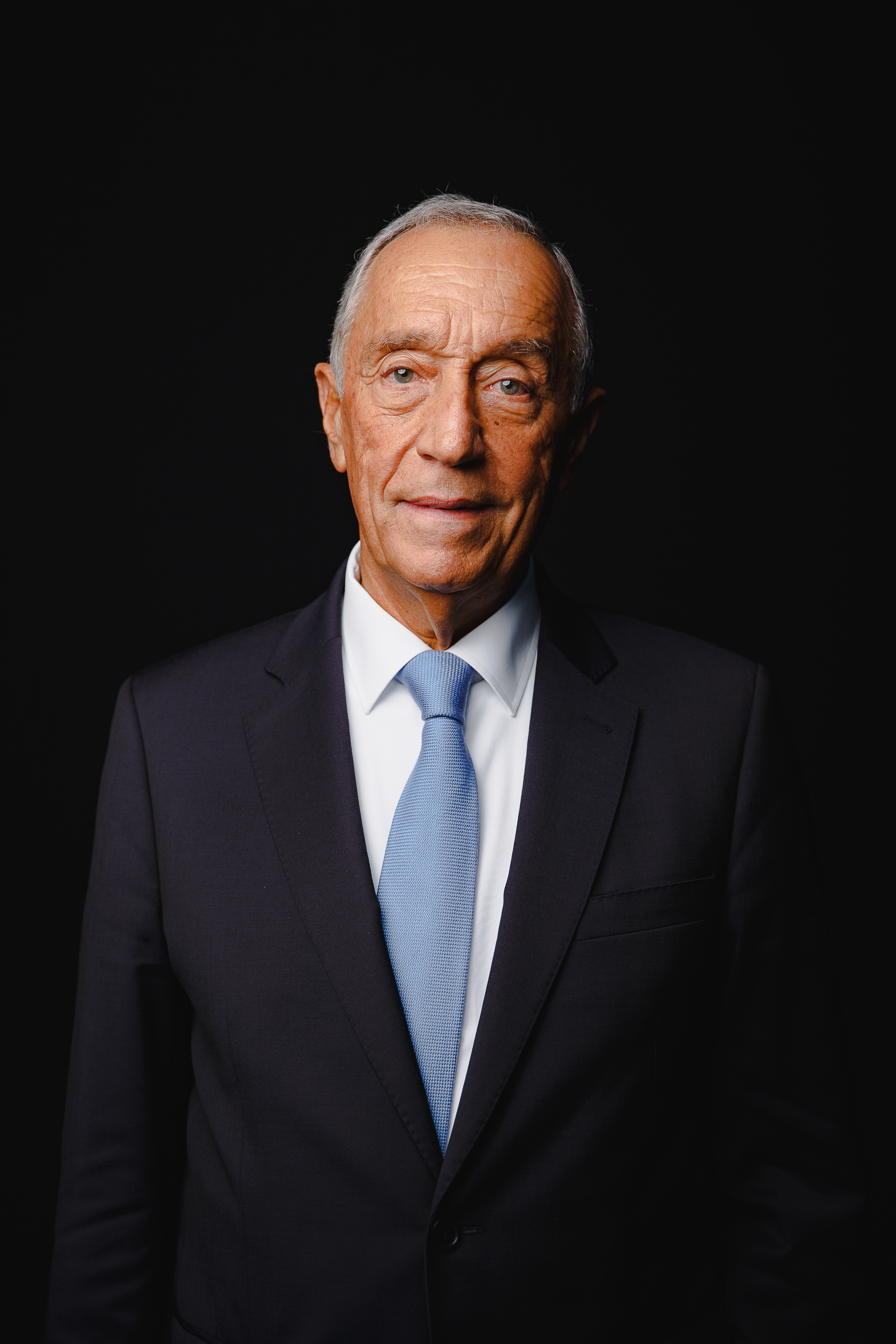

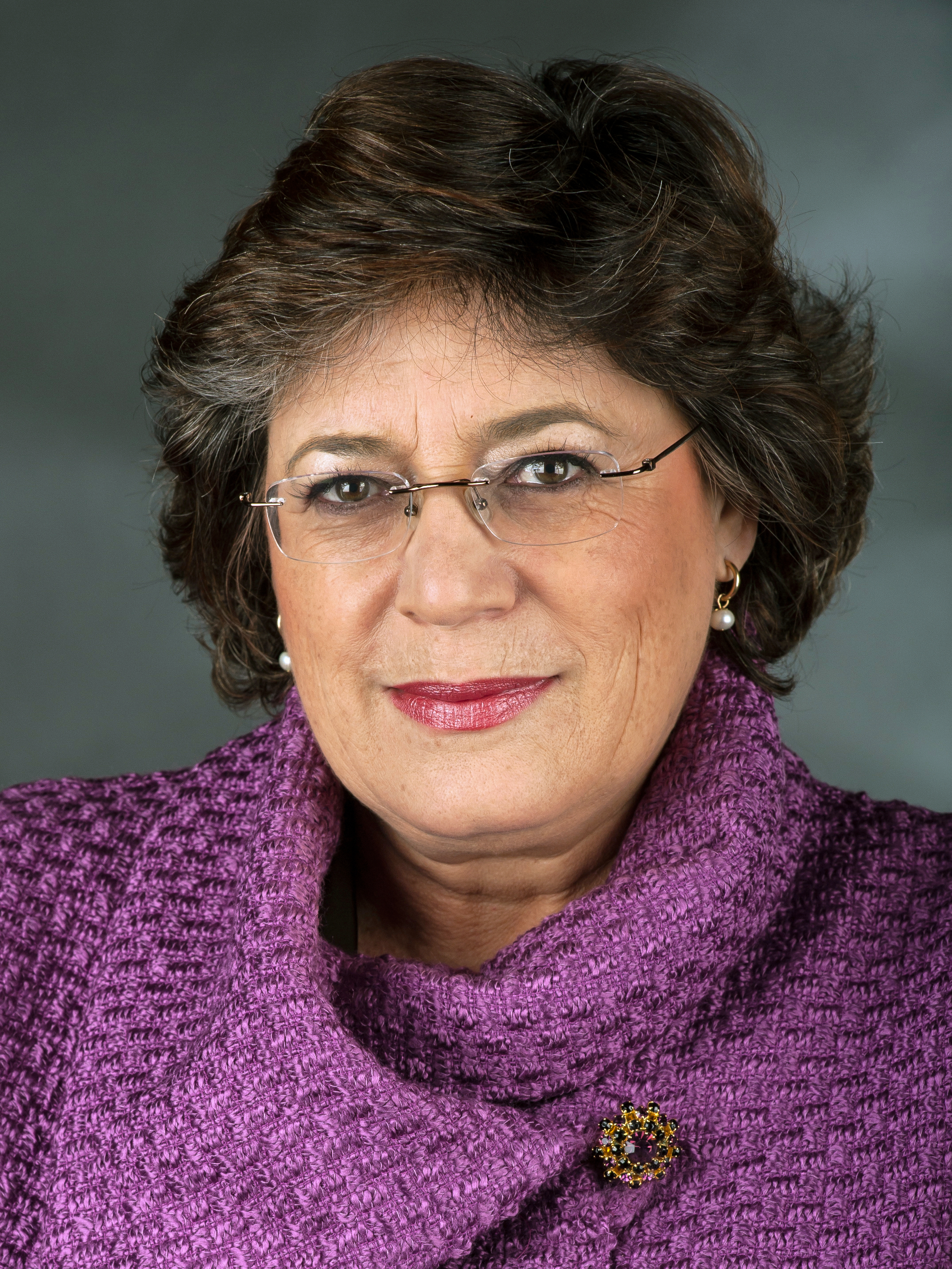

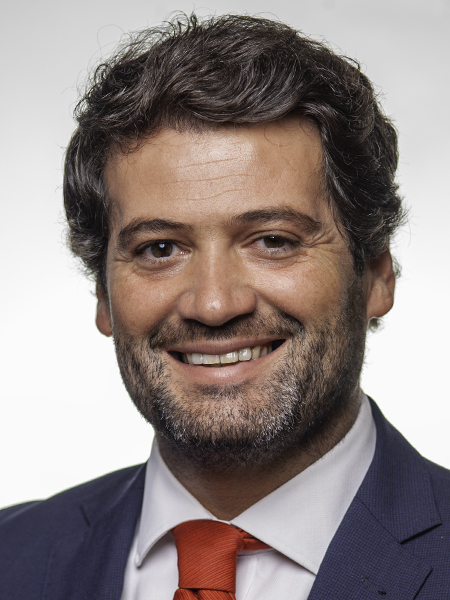
Candidate	Marcelo Rebelo de Sousa	Ana Gomes	André Ventura
Party	PSD Supported by: CDS–PP	Independent (Note: Even though she is a member of PS, the party did not officially back any candidate in particular) Supported by: PAN; LIVRE	CH
Popular vote	2,531,692	540,823	497,746
Percentage	60.67%	12.96%	11.93%
- Results by district
President before election
Marcelo Rebelo de Sousa
PSD
Elected President
Marcelo Rebelo de Sousa
PSD

A presidential election was held in Portugal on 24 January 2021. The incumbent President, Marcelo Rebelo de Sousa, was reelected for a second term.

The elections were held during the COVID-19 pandemic, and Portugal was under a lockdown as of election day. President Marcelo Rebelo de Sousa was reelected by a landslide, winning 60.7 percent of the votes. He won every district in the country and all 308 municipalities, a result which happened for the first time ever in Portuguese democracy; he won 3,083 parishes out of 3,092. The election also marked the rise of right-wing candidate André Ventura, leader of Chega, who polled 3rd with almost 12 percent of the votes. In second place, former MEP and Ambassador Ana Gomes was able to win 13 percent of the votes, the best result ever for a female candidate in a presidential election. As in the 2016 elections, the Socialist Party (PS) did not officially endorse any candidate, despite Ana Gomes being a PS member. The rest of candidates did not receive above 5 percent each.

Voter turnout fell to 39 percent, a drop of nine percentage points, mainly due to the automatic registration of overseas voters; this practice increased the number of registered voters to almost 11 million. In Portugal alone, turnout stood at 45.45 percent, a decrease of 4.6 percentage points compared to 2016. This was the lowest drop in turnout in an election with an incumbent running since 1980. Marcelo Rebelo de Sousa was sworn in for a second term as President on 9 March 2021.

== Background ==
Marcelo Rebelo de Sousa was elected president with 52% of the votes in January 2016. In Portugal, the president is the head of state and has mostly ceremonial powers. However, the president does have some political influence, and can dissolve Parliament if a crisis occurs. The president's official residence is the Belém Palace in Lisbon. Throughout his first term, Marcelo had to cohabitate with Socialist prime minister António Costa, with the institutional relationship described as very good. During his term as head of state, Marcelo also had high approval ratings, influenced by his "affections presidency" style and his empathetic response to national disasters, such as the 2017 wildfires. The last year of Marcelo's first term was dominated by the Covid-19 pandemic, with the head of state declaring a state of emergency at the government's request.

=== Pre-campaign ===
Early on, the Social Democrats (PSD) declared their support for Marcelo's re-election, while the president only announced his re-election bid in December 2020, just over a month before election day. On the Socialist Party (PS), prime minister António Costa also expressed, from early on, his "endorsement" to a second term for Marcelo, but the prime minister's position created divisions on the left and within his own party. After this, former PS MEP Ana Gomes, who strongly criticized Costa's stance, announced she was considering a run, which she confirmed in September 2020. Sole Chega party MP, André Ventura, also announced his candidacy just a few months after being elected to parliament in the 2019 legislative election, while the Left Bloc repeated the candidacy of Marisa Matias, the communists presented MEP João Ferreira and the Liberal Initiative, also a new party that gained representation in the 2019 legislative election, declared Tiago Mayan Gonçalves as their presidential candidate.

== Electoral system ==
Under Portuguese law, a candidate must receive a majority of votes (50% plus one vote) to be elected. If no candidate achieved a majority in the first round, a runoff election (i.e., second round, held between the two candidates who received the most votes in the first round) should be held.

In order to stand for election, candidates must be of Portuguese origin and over 35 years old, gather 7,500 signatures of support one month before the election and submit them to the Constitutional Court of Portugal. The Constitutional Court then certifies the candidacies which meet the requirements to appear on the ballot. The highest number of candidacies ever accepted was ten in 2016.

=== Early voting ===
For the first time in a Presidential election, voters were also able to vote early, which would happen one week before election day on 17 January 2021. Voters had to register between 10 and 14 January in order to be eligible to cast an early ballot; a total of 246,880 voters requested to vote early in 2021. On 17 January, 197,903 voters (80.16 percent of voters that registered) cast an early ballot.

== Candidates ==
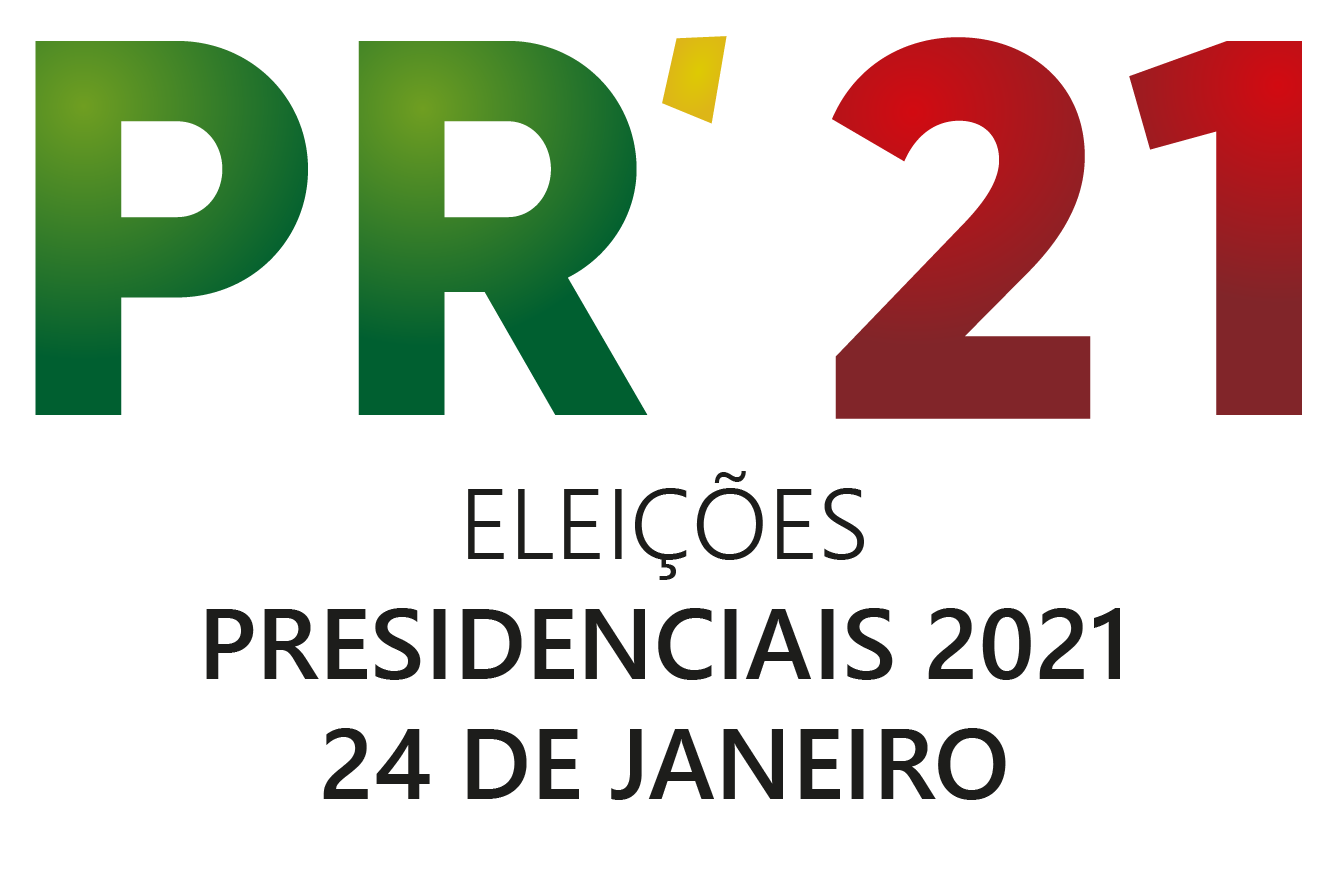
Official logo of the election.

There were seven candidates certified to run in this election. In addition, the Constitutional Court rejected Eduardo Baptista's nomination due to insufficient signatures, although his name still appeared on the ballot, albeit votes cast for him would be counted as invalid. Six more individuals had announced their intention to run for President, but did not present any application to the Court, two of whom publicly stated that they would withdraw, which includes Democratic Republican Party (PDR) leader Bruno Fialho who, despite saying he had enough signatures, decided to drop out in order "not to spend thousands of euros on the country". Finally, three more individuals were, for a while, thought of as potential or speculative candidates, but later ruled out any type of candidacy.

=== Official Candidates ===
Candidate	Supported by	Political office(s)	Details	Announcement date	Ref.
André Ventura (38)	Chega	President of Chega (since 2019); Member of Parliament for Lisbon (since 2019)	Founder of Chega and sole MP from the party.	29 February 2020	
Tiago Mayan Gonçalves (43)	Liberal Initiative	None	Founding member of the Liberal Initiative (IL).	25 July 2020	
Vitorino Silva (49)	React, Include, Recycle	President of React, Include, Recycle (2019–2022); President of the Parish Council of Rans (1994–2002)	Candidate in the 2016 presidential election, finishing sixth with 3.3% of the votes.	8 September 2020	
Marisa Matias (44)	Left Bloc; Socialist Alternative Movement	Member of the European Parliament (2009–2024)	Candidate in the 2016 presidential election, finishing third with 10.1% of the votes.	9 September 2020	
Ana Gomes (66)	People Animals Nature; LIVRE	Member of the European Parliament (2004–2019); Ambassador to Indonesia (2000–2003)	Member of the Socialist Party (PS); failed to gain the support of the party.	10 September 2020	
João Ferreira (42)	Portuguese Communist Party; Ecologist Party "The Greens"	Member of the European Parliament (2009–2021)	Member of the Portuguese Communist Party (PCP); supported by the Unitary Democratic Coalition.	17 September 2020	
Marcelo Rebelo de Sousa (72)	Social Democratic Party; CDS – People's Party	President of the Republic (since 2016); Member of the Council of State (2006–2016); President of the Social Democratic Party (1996–1999); Minister of Parliamentary Affairs (1982–1983); Member of the Constitituent Assembly (1975–1976)	Incumbent president after winning the 2016 presidential election, with 52.0% of the votes; eligible for a second term.	7 December 2020	

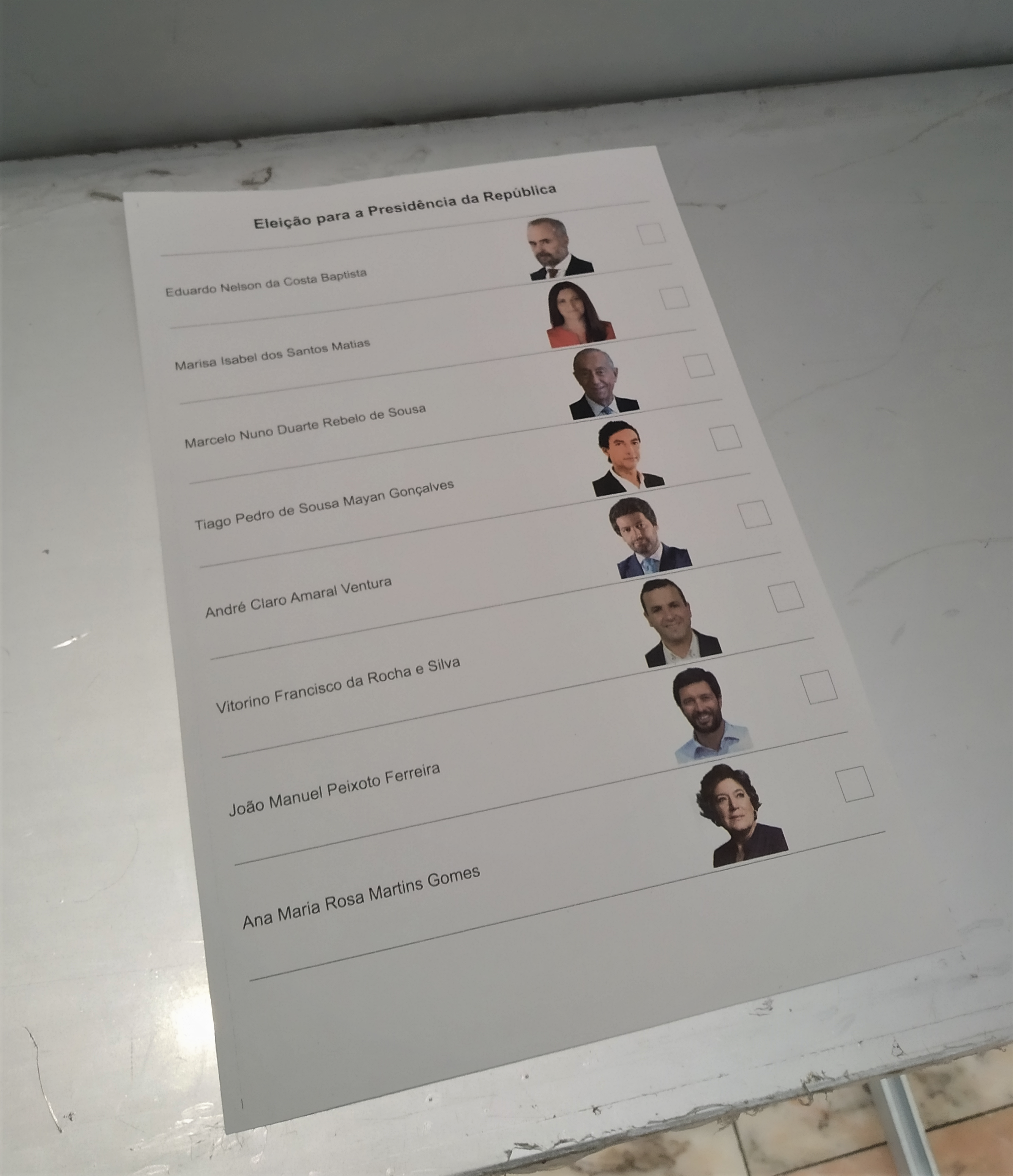
Ballot paper for the 2021 Portuguese presidential election. It includes Eduardo Baptista, a candidate rejected due to insufficient signatures.

=== Rejected candidates ===
- Eduardo Baptista, NATO Staff Officer, Independent; (Note: Candidate only delivered 11 signatures, of which only 6 were valid, far short of the required 7,500. However, his name appeared on ballots, as they started being printed before the Court officially verified all candidacies' documents. Votes for Eduardo Baptista were counted as invalid.)

=== Unsuccessful candidates ===
- Carla Bastos, Socialist Party member, Finances inspector;
- Orlando Cruz, former People's Party member;
- Paulo Alves, Together for the People party member, former member of the Felgueiras municipal assembly (2005-2009)
- Paulo Patinha Antão, unemployed

=== Withdrew ===
- Bruno Fialho, Democratic Republican Party (PDR) leader;
- Gonçalo da Câmara Pereira, People's Monarchist Party (PPM) president, fado singer, actor and rural producer

=== Refused ===
- Adolfo Mesquita Nunes, former Secretary of State for Tourism (2013–2015) and People's Party MP (2011–2013).
- António Sampaio da Nóvoa, former Rector of the University of Lisbon (2006–2013); presidential candidate in 2016, polled second place with almost 23 percent of the vote;
- Miguel Albuquerque, President of the Regional Government of Madeira since 2015; former Mayor of Funchal (1994–2013).

== Campaign ==
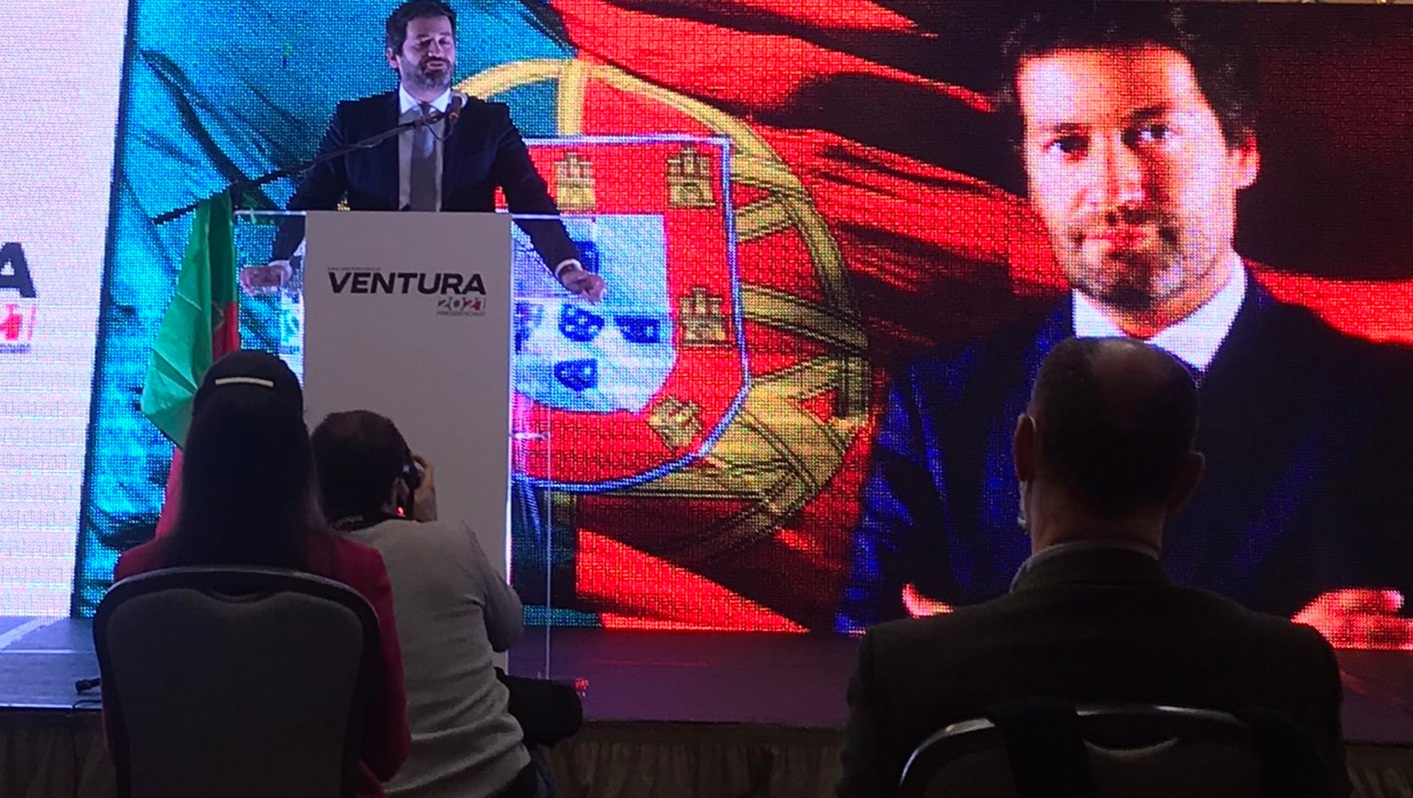
Chega's Ventura's speech during election night of the 2021 presidential election

=== Issues ===
The campaign was severely limited by the COVID-19 pandemic, with candidates being forced to reduce campaign events to a minimum due to movement limitations imposed by the Government to prevent the spread of the virus. There were mandatory curfews in several municipalities and movement between all municipalities was prohibited during the weekends.

At the beginning of the electoral campaign, the president of the French National Rally party, Marine Le Pen, confirmed that she would go to Lisbon to support André Ventura's presidential candidacy.

=== Candidates' slogans ===
Candidate	Original slogan	English translation	Refs
Marisa Matias	« Força Maior »	"Greater Force"	
João Ferreira	« Coragem e confiança. Um horizonte de esperança »	"Courage and confidence. A horizon of hope"	
Vitorino Silva	« O Povo a Presidente! »	"The People for President!"	
Ana Gomes	« Cuidar de Portugal »	"Taking care of Portugal"	
André Ventura	« Por Portugal, Pelos Portugueses! »	"For Portugal, for the Portuguese!"	
Tiago Mayan Gonçalves	« A alternativa liberal »	"The liberal alternative"	
~~Bruno Fialho~~ (Note: Withdrew)	~~« A escolha certa »~~	~~"The right choice"~~	

=== Candidates' debates ===
2021 Portuguese presidential election debates
Date	Time	Organisers	Moderator(s)	I Invitee P Present NI Not invited A Absent invitee							
Date	Time	Organisers	Moderator(s)	Rebelo de Sousa	Gomes	Ventura	Matias	Ferreira	Mayan	Silva	Refs
2 Jan 2021	9 PM	RTP1	Carlos Daniel	P	NI	NI	P	NI	NI	NI	
2 Jan 2021	10 PM	TVI24	Carla Moita	NI	NI	P	NI	P	NI	NI	
3 Jan 2021	9 PM	RTP1	Carlos Daniel	P	NI	NI	NI	NI	P	NI	
4 Jan 2021	9 PM	TVI	Pedro Mourinho	P	NI	NI	NI	P	NI	NI	
4 Jan 2021	10 PM	SIC Notícias	Clara de Sousa	NI	P	NI	P	NI	NI	NI	
4 Jan 2021	10:45 PM	RTP3	Carlos Daniel	NI	NI	P	NI	NI	NI	P	
5 Jan 2021	9 PM	RTP1	Carlos Daniel	NI	P	NI	NI	P	NI	NI	
5 Jan 2021	10 PM	SIC Notícias	Clara de Sousa	NI	NI	P	NI	NI	P	NI	
5 Jan 2021	10:45 PM	RTP3	Carlos Daniel	NI	NI	NI	P	NI	NI	P	
6 Jan 2021	9 PM	SIC	Clara de Sousa	P	NI	P	NI	NI	NI	NI	
6 Jan 2021	10 PM	TVI24	Carla Moita	NI	NI	NI	NI	P	P	NI	
6 Jan 2021	10:45 PM	RTP3	Carlos Daniel	NI	P	NI	NI	NI	NI	P	
7 Jan 2021	9 PM	SIC	Clara de Sousa	NI	NI	P	P	NI	NI	NI	
7 Jan 2021	10 PM	TVI24	Carla Moita	NI	P	NI	NI	NI	P	NI	
7 Jan 2021	10:45 PM	RTP3	Carlos Daniel	P	NI	NI	NI	NI	NI	P	
8 Jan 2021	9 PM	TVI	Pedro Mourinho	NI	P	P	NI	NI	NI	NI	
8 Jan 2021	9:30 PM	RTP1	Carlos Daniel	NI	NI	NI	P	P	NI	NI	
8 Jan 2021	10:45 PM	RTP3	Carlos Daniel	NI	NI	NI	NI	NI	P	P	
9 Jan 2021	9 PM	RTP1	Carlos Daniel	P	P	NI	NI	NI	NI	NI	
9 Jan 2021	10 PM	SIC Notícias	Clara de Sousa	NI	NI	NI	P	NI	P	NI	
9 Jan 2021	10:45 PM	RTP3	Carlos Daniel	NI	NI	NI	NI	P	NI	P	
12 Jan 2021	9 PM	RTP1	Carlos Daniel	P (Note: Via videotelephony)	P	P	P	P	P	P	
18 Jan 2021	9 AM	Antena 1, RR, TSF	Natália Carvalho; Eunice Lourenço; Judith Menezes e Sousa	P	P	A	P	P	P	P	

== Opinion polling ==
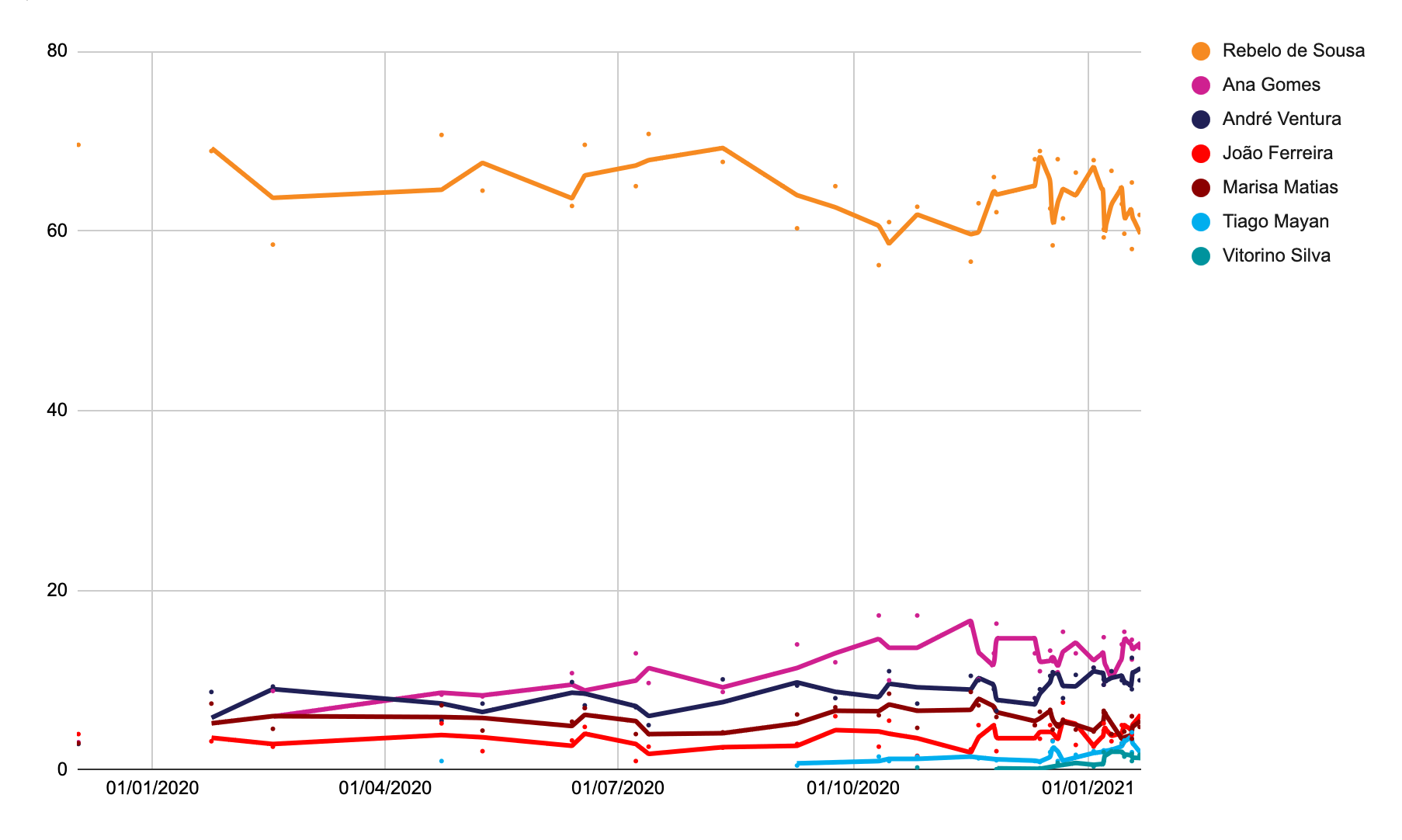
Graph of the polling for the 2021 Portuguese presidential election.

== Campaign budgets ==
Candidate (party)	Election Result	State Subsidy		Political Parties Contributions	Fundraising	Total Revenue		Expenses	Debt
Candidate (party)	Election Result	Calculated	Budgeted	Political Parties Contributions	Fundraising	Calculated	Budgeted	Expenses	Debt
Marcelo R. Sousa (PSD, CDS–PP)	60.7%	€23,827	€25,000	€0	€5,500	€25,927	€30,500	€24,927	€0
Ana Gomes (PAN, L)	13.0%	€132,435	€20,000	€0	€33,500	€167,133	€53,500	€135,453	€0
André Ventura (CH)	11.9%	€146,072	€0	€25,000	€135,000	€201,112	€160,000	€201,112	€0
João Ferreira (PCP, PEV)	4.3%	€0	€385,000	€50,000	€15,000	€274,264	€450,000	€274,264	€0
Marisa Matias (BE, MAS)	4.0%	€0	€256,617	€0	€6,000	€357,872	€256,617	€357,872	€0
Tiago M. Gonçalves (IL)	3.2%	€0	€0	€25,000	€13,450	€47,263	€38,450	€47,284	€21
Vitorino Silva (RIR)	3.0%	€0	€0	€0	€16,000	€7,160	€16,000	€7,155	€5
Source: Portuguese Constitutional Court (TC)

== Voter turnout ==
The table below shows voter turnout throughout election day including voters from Overseas.

Turnout	Time								
Turnout	12:00			16:00			19:00		
Turnout	2016	2021	±	2016	2021	±	2016	2021	±
Total	15.82%	17.07%	▲1.25 pp	37.69%	35.44%	▼2.25 pp	48.66%	39.26%	▼9.40 pp

== Results ==
=== National summary ===
Candidate	Party	Votes	%
Marcelo Rebelo de Sousa	Social Democratic Party (Note: Also supported by CDS – People's Party.)	2,531,692	60.67
Ana Gomes	Independent (Note: Supported by the People Animals Nature and LIVRE.)	540,823	12.96
André Ventura	Chega	497,746	11.93
João Ferreira	Portuguese Communist Party (Note: Also supported by the Ecologist Party "The Greens".)	179,764	4.31
Marisa Matias	Left Bloc (Note: Also supported by the Socialist Alternative Movement.)	165,127	3.96
Tiago Mayan Gonçalves	Liberal Initiative	134,991	3.23
Vitorino Silva	React, Include, Recycle	123,031	2.95
Total		4,173,174	100.00
Valid votes		4,173,174	98.00
Invalid votes		38,018	0.89
Blank votes		47,164	1.11
Total votes		4,258,356	100.00
Registered voters/turnout		10,847,434	39.26
Source: Comissão Nacional de Eleições

=== Results by district ===
District	Marcelo		Gomes		Ventura		Ferreira		Matias		Mayan		Vitorino Silva		Turnout
District	Votes	%	Votes	%	Votes	%	Votes	%	Votes	%	Votes	%	Votes	%	Turnout
Aveiro	176,763	65.66%	31,812	11.82%	25,894	9.62%	6,309	2.34%	10,421	3.87%	8,338	3.10%	9,670	3.59%	42.78%
Azores	56,178	69.67%	8,940	11.09%	7,560	9.38%	1,536	1.90%	3,176	3.94%	1,666	2.07%	1,575	1.95%	36.07%
Beja	26,910	51.30%	5,613	10.70%	8,490	16.19%	7,877	15.02%	1,895	3.61%	708	1.35%	962	1.83%	43.94%
Braga	234,617	63.93%	44,780	12.20%	39,281	10.70%	10,192	2.78%	12,572	3.43%	11,932	3.25%	13,622	3.71%	48.52%
Bragança	27,258	60.47%	4,851	10.76%	7,939	17.61%	1,019	2.26%	1,511	3.35%	842	1.87%	1,656	3.67%	33.28%
Castelo Branco	44,170	62.13%	8,212	11.55%	9,920	13.95%	2,499	3.52%	2,946	4.14%	1,477	2.08%	1,869	2.63%	43.33%
Coimbra	97,778	62.44%	20,938	13.02%	15,682	10.01%	6,022	3.85%	8,588	5.48%	3,968	2.53%	4,171	2.66%	42.37%
Évora	31,712	54.70%	5,974	10.30%	9,720	16.76%	6,262	10.80%	2,079	3.59%	1,176	2.03%	1,055	1.82%	43.60%
Faro	89,393	57.33%	18,312	11.74%	26,023	16.69%	6,607	4.24%	7,612	4.88%	4,038	2.59%	3,943	2.53%	42.11%
Guarda	34,582	64.04%	5,637	10.44%	7,737	14.33%	1,328	2.46%	1,874	3.47%	1,030	1.91%	1,810	3.35%	37.41%
Leiria	115,484	63.94%	18,871	10.45%	22,576	12.50%	5,761	3.19%	7,222	4.00%	5,185	2.87%	5,526	3.06%	44.70%
Lisbon	556,028	57.80%	136,608	14.51%	123,644	12.85%	48,721	5.06%	36,618	3.81%	39,190	4.07%	18,173	1.89%	50.97%
Madeira	77,945	72.16%	8,510	7.88%	10,642	9.85%	1,855	1.72%	4,601	4.26%	2,484	2.30%	1,986	1.84%	42.71%
Portalegre	21,984	55.71%	4,034	10.22%	7,908	20.04%	2,868	7.27%	1,234	3.13%	703	1.78%	731	1.85%	42.23%
Porto	450,175	60.01%	116,906	15.58%	63,194	8.42%	24,456	3.26%	29,867	3.98%	32,194	4.29%	33,427	4.46%	48.10%
Santarém	101,233	60.74%	16,359	9.81%	26,260	15.76%	8,274	4.96%	6,229	3.74%	3,759	2.26%	4,563	2.74%	44.90%
Setúbal	190,912	56.17%	45,442	13.37%	43,720	12.86%	30,397	8.94%	14,792	4.35%	7,838	2.31%	6,771	1.99%	46.54%
Viana do Castelo	56,937	63.66%	10,348	11.57%	10,177	11.38%	2,851	3.19%	3,296	3.69%	2,244	2.51%	3,583	4.01%	38.49%
Vila Real	47,960	63.50%	8,629	11.42%	10,347	13.70%	1,912	2.53%	2,461	3.26%	1,572	2.08%	2,650	3.51%	35.81%
Viseu	81,568	65.25%	12,992	10.39%	16,446	13.16%	2,750	2.20%	4,174	3.34%	2,524	2.02%	4,553	3.64%	37.26%
Overseas	15,158	52.65%	5,328	18.51%	3,613	12.55%	1,022	3.55%	1,573	5.46%	1,616	5.61%	478	1.66%	1.88%
Source: 2021 Presidential election results

=== Maps ===
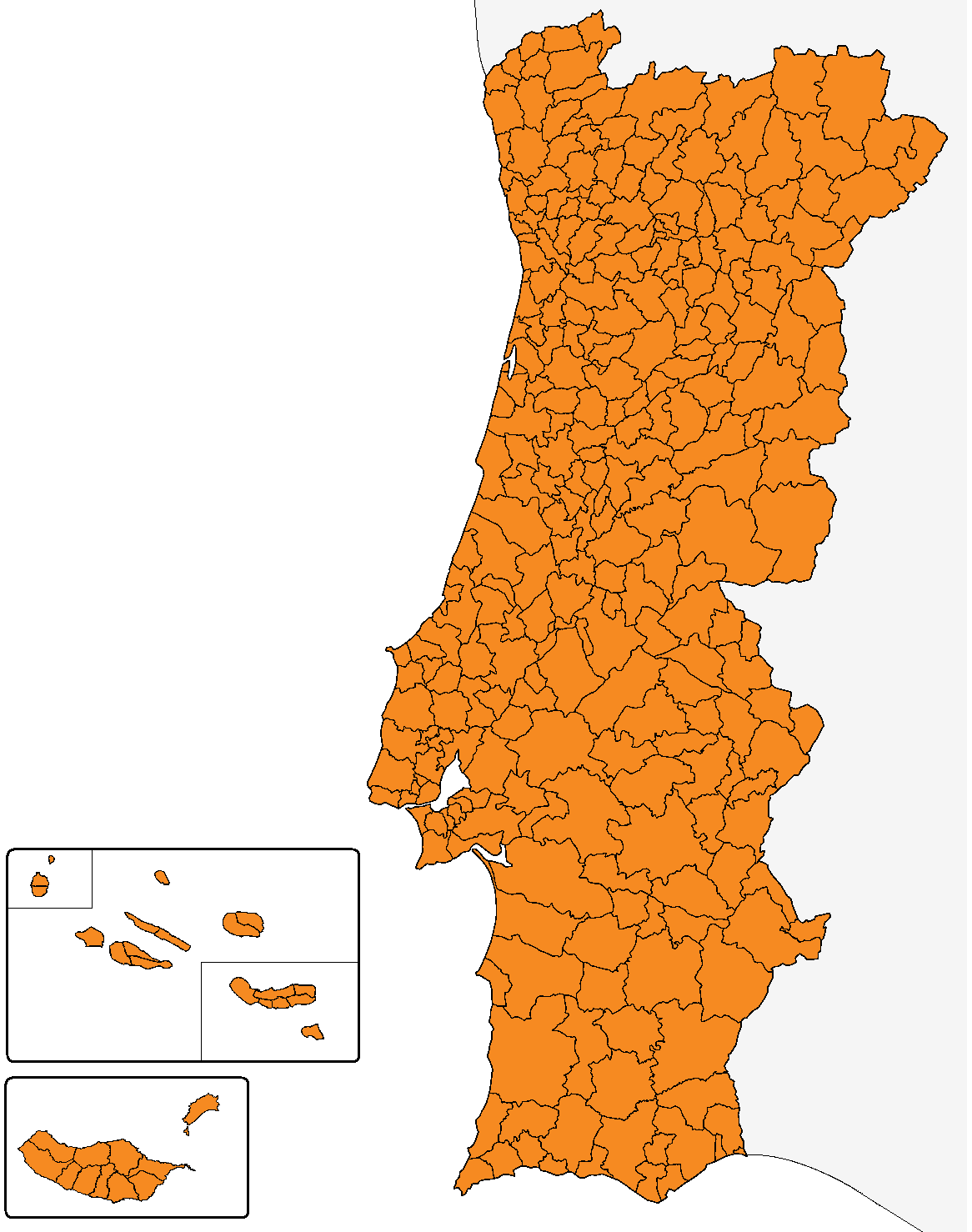
Strongest candidate by municipality: Marcelo - orange.

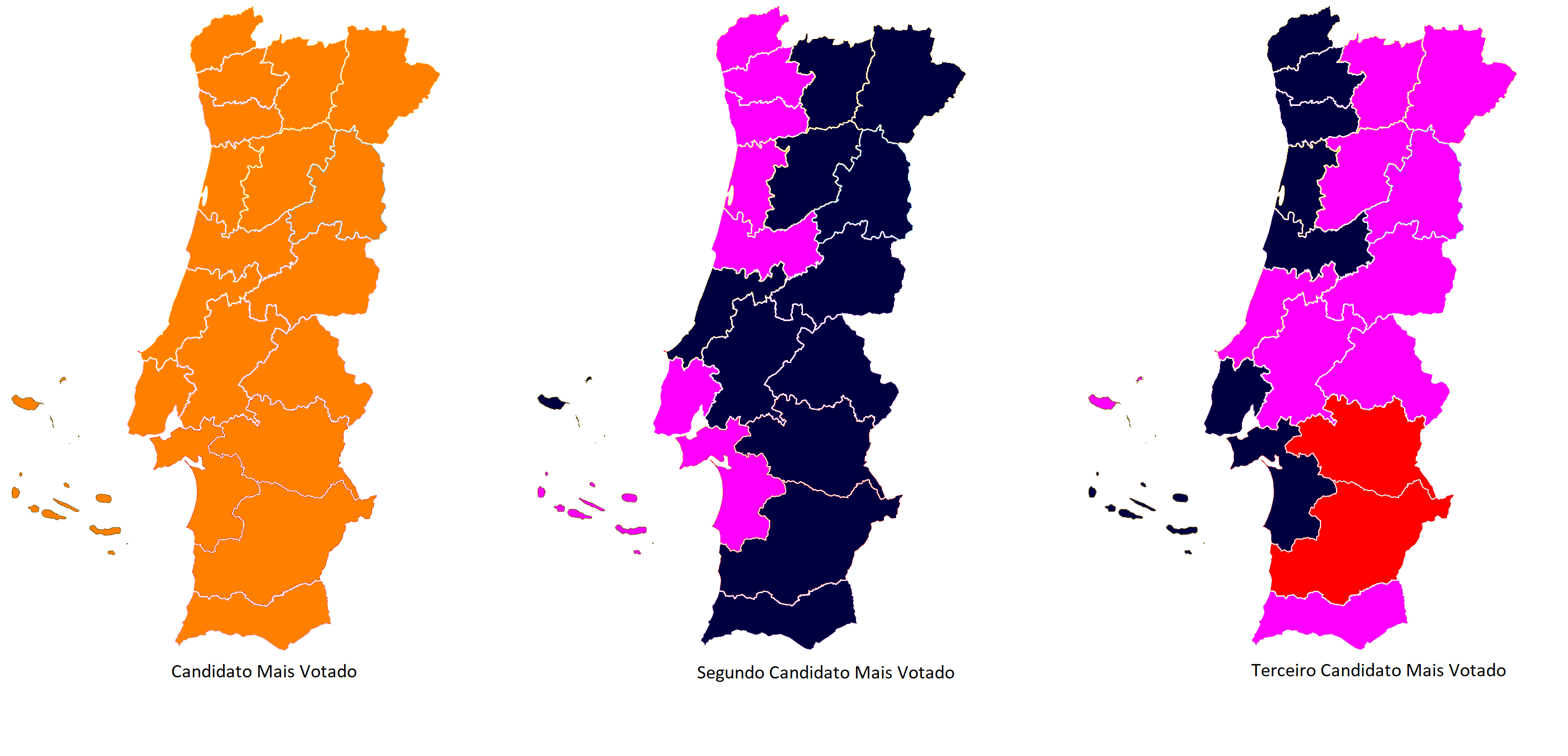
First, second and third most voted candidates by district: Marcelo - orange; Gomes - pink; Ventura - dark blue; Ferreira - red.

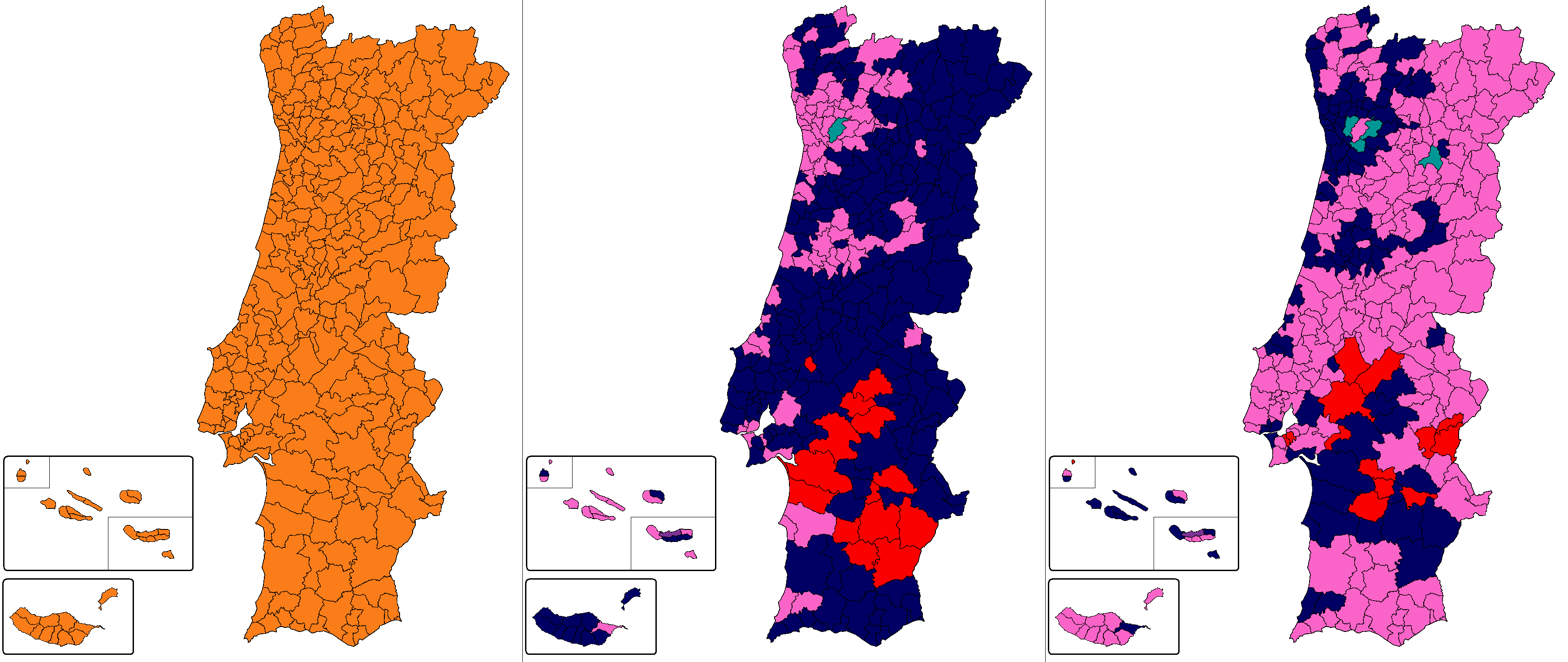
First, second and third most voted candidates by municipality: Marcelo - orange; Gomes - pink; Ventura - dark blue; Ferreira - red; Vitorino Silva - Light Sea Green.

=== Accomplishments ===
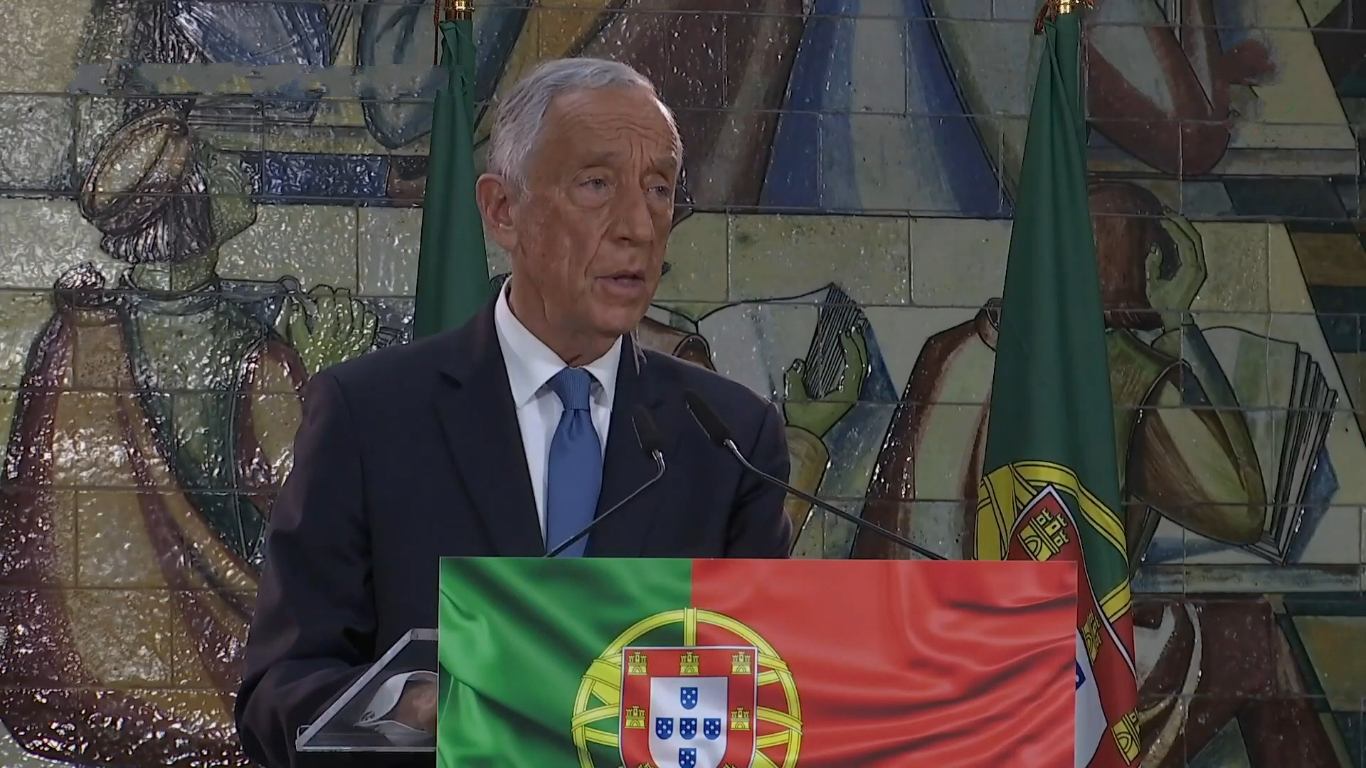
Marcelo Rebelo de Sousa delivering his victory speech after being reelected.

Marcelo Rebelo de Sousa won the third highest vote margin ever in a presidential election in Portugal since democracy was restored, only behind Mário Soares' 70.35 percent in 1991 and António Ramalho Eanes' 61.59 percent in 1976. He was also the first candidate ever to win the vote in all municipalities, and win in 3083 out of 3092 parishes of the country.

Ana Gomes became the most voted woman ever in a presidential election in Portugal, beating Marisa Matias' previous record of 10.12 percent in 2016, and the first to get second place.
