= Clemens Nathan =

German-born English businessman

- Born: 24 August 1933; Hamburg, Germany
- Died: 2 June 2015 (aged 81)
- Education: Berkhamsted Boys School; University of Leeds
- Occupations: Businessman, philanthropist
- Spouse: Rachel Nathan
- Children: 3

Clemens Neumann Nathan (24 August 1933 – 2 June 2015) was a German-born English businessman and philanthropist. He was a campaigner on behalf of Jewish causes, and for international human rights and interfaith dialogue.

== Early life ==
Born in Hamburg, Nazi Germany, on August 24,1933, Nathan came with his family to England at the age of three to escape Nazi persecution.

Nathan was educated at Berkhamsted Boys School in Hertfordshire, and subsequently studied wool manufacture at the Scottish Woollen Technical College in Galashiels, Scotland. He was awarded an MPhil at the University of Leeds in Textile Industry.

== Career ==
At the age of 24, Nathan became managing director of the textile agency Cunart Ltd. He was an active member of the Textile Institute, and was a Vice-President (1974–1978), Vice-Chairman (1991–1992), Fellow, Council Member and a Companion Member of the Institute. He wrote papers for Textile Outlook and other journals. He delivered lectures at international conferences, serving as a visiting lecturer on textile technology at the College of Distributive Trades in London and lecturing regularly at the University of Leeds, as well as contributing to research at the university.

== Philanthropy ==
Nathan was the founding Chairman of The Centre for the Study of Jewish-Christian Relations (1998–2003) (now The Woolf Institute) in Cambridge, which is devoted to teaching, research and dialogue between the three Abrahamic faiths. He subsequently became its Honorary Vice President. He was a Board Member of the Conference on Jewish Material Claims Against Germany and was Life President of the Support Group for the Centre for German-Jewish Studies at the University of Sussex.

Nathan was a "founding figure" in the establishment of the NGO Rene Cassin, a human rights organization. He was also a Board Member for the Memorial Foundation for Jewish Culture and a close associate of over 40 years with the Paris-based Alliance Israélite Universelle.

In 2004 Nathan established the Clemens Nathan Research Centre, organizing numerous international conferences and publishing many books on human rights

As a result of his work, amongst other public engagements he gave a lecture at The Peace Palace in the Hague for a conference on reparations hosted by REDRESS, entitled 'The Relevance of Post-Holocaust Experience', and he was invited to lecture at the University of Pennsylvania in 2009 on 'Human Rights in the 21st Century'.

Nathan was also a respected and prominent figure within the UK Jewish community. He was President of the Anglo-Jewish Association (1983–1989), Joint Chairman of the Consultative Council of Jewish Organisations (CCJO), and a director of the Sephardi Centre in London. He was also a governor of the Shenkar College of Engineering and Design in Israel.

In 1966 Nathan received the Italian Cavalieri Al Merito, Knight and Order of Merit for services to the textile industry. He was also awarded the Textile Institute Service Medal for services to industry and to the Textile Institute (1986). In 1996 he received The Officer's Cross (Grosses Ehrenzeichen) of Austria (for outstanding services for world humanitarian and understanding in Christian/Jewish work, and for bilateral trade between the UK and Austria). He also received a medal from the State of Israel for his input to its Economic Council.

Nathan was described as "the human of human rights" and "amongst the outstanding Englishmen of today and one of the great Jews of our generation". In 2012, he was one of a small group to offer the loyal address by the British Jewish Community to the Queen on the occasion of her Diamond Jubilee.

== Personal life, death and legacy ==
Nathan married Rachel in 1963 with whom he had three children. He was a member of the Worshipful Company of Glovers and the Athenaeum Club. He died on 2 June 2015.

In 2016 the Clemens N Nathan PhD Scholarship Programme was established in tribute of Clemens Nathan. Run by the Centre for German-Jewish Studies at the University of Sussex, it has been partially funded by the Association of Jewish Refugees and the Anglo-Jewish Association.

An edited book of essays entitled Contemporary Human Rights Challenges: The Universal Declaration of Human Rights and its Continuing Relevance was published in Nathan's memory to mark the 70th Anniversary (10 December 2018) of the Universal Declaration of Human Rights. The book's foreword is written by UNESCO Secretary General Audrey Azoulay and contains 18 essays including ones by Lord Williams and President Jimmy Carter.
