= International Institute of Human Rights =

French organization

The International Institute of Human Rights (French: Institut international des droits de l'homme, IIDH) is an association under French local law based in Strasbourg, France. It includes approximately 300 members (individual and collective) worldwide, including universities, researchers and practitioners of human rights.

The IIDH was founded by René Cassin, who won the Nobel Peace Prize in 1968. He donated the prize money for the creation of an international institute of human rights in Strasbourg. The current president is Jean-Paul Costa since 2011.

IIHR is a recognized partner of the United Nations and has consultative status with ECOSOC and UNESCO. It also collaborates with other international and regional organizations, including the Council of Europe, the Organization for Security and Cooperation in Europe and the African Union.

== See also ==
- CCJO René Cassin
- European Convention on Human Rights
- European Court of Human Rights
- European Institutions in Strasbourg
- International human rights law
- Three generations of human rights
- Universal Declaration of Human Rights
