= Ana Gomes =

Portuguese diplomat and politician

Ana Gomes GCC GOIH ComM
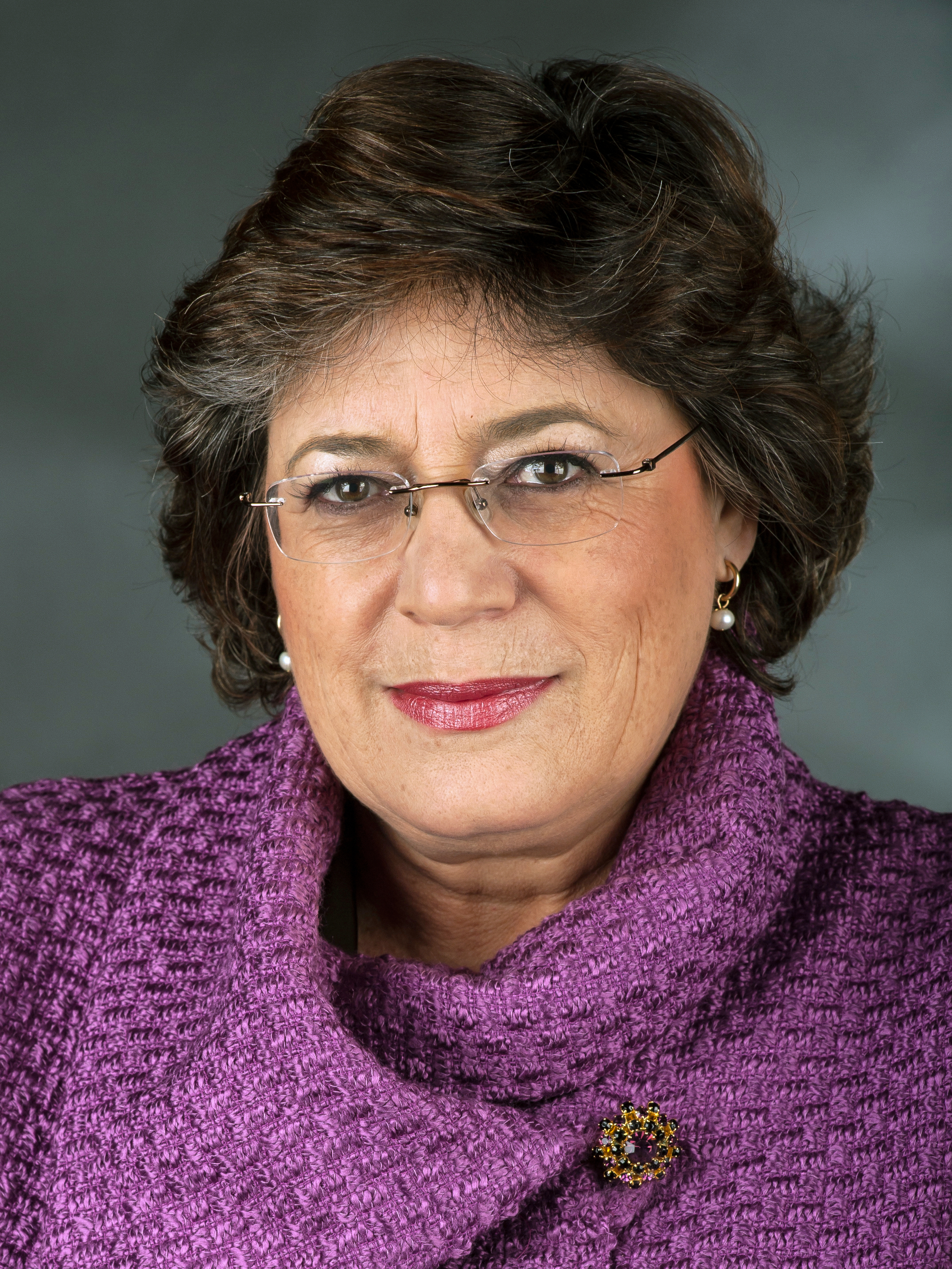
- Gomes in 2014

Member of the European Parliament
- In office 20 July 2004 – 1 July 2019
- Constituency: Portugal

Portuguese Ambassador to Indonesia
- In office 12 July 2000 – 14 April 2003
- Preceded by: Guilherme de Sousa Girão (acting, as chargé d'affaires)
- Succeeded by: José Manuel Santos Braga

Personal details
- Born: Ana Maria Rosa Martins Gomes; 9 February 1954 (age 72) São Sebastião da Pedreira, Lisbon, Portugal
- Party: Socialist Party (2002–present)
- Other political affiliations: Workers' Communist Party (1973–1976)
- Spouses: António Monteiro Cardoso (m. 1974; div. 1975) António Franco (m. 1994; died 2020)
- Children: 1
- Education: University of Lisbon
- Occupation: Diplomat
- Website: www.anagomes.eu

Ana Maria Rosa Martins Gomes GCC GOIH ComM (born 9 February 1954), better known as Ana Gomes, is a Portuguese former diplomat and politician of the Socialist Party (PS).

She earned wide recognition for her role in negotiating independence for East Timor, a former Portuguese colony, and in the reestablishment of diplomatic relations between Portugal and Indonesia. She later suspended her career as a diplomat to enter party politics, and served as a Member of the European Parliament from 2004 until 2019, where she was an outspoken campaigner on corruption and human rights.

On 10 September 2020, she officially announced her candidacy for the 2021 Portuguese presidential election, without official support from the Socialist Party. She finished second, with 13% of the votes, the best result ever achieved by a woman in a presidential election in Portugal.

== Education and early political career ==
Ana Gomes was born in 1954 in Alfredo da Costa Maternity Hospital, in the Lisbon parish of São Sebastião da Pedreira, and she grew up during the authoritarian Estado Novo regime.

Her father, Jorge Pedro Martins Gomes, was an officer of the merchant marine and her mother, Maria Alice Rosa Gomes, a homemaker. Both were politically minded and opposed the authoritarian regime. In her teenage years, she accompanied her father to the rallies of the opposition movements Democratic Unity Electoral Commission (CEUD, Comissão Eleitoral de Unidade Democrática) and the Portuguese Democratic Movement/Democratic Electoral Commissions (MDP/CDE, Movimento Democrático Português/Comissões Democráticas Eleitorais) that unsuccessfully ran in the fraudulent 1969 legislative election, amid extensive harassment of opposition candidates and voter manipulation. Her parents allowed her and her sister a liberal education, initially at Colégio da Baforeira, a boarding school in Parede, and then the lyceum in São João do Estoril, and later still the Maria Amália Vaz de Carvalho Lyceum in Lisbon, where she became an activist of the Associative Movement of the Lisbon Secondary Education Students (MAEESL, Movimento Associativo de Estudantes do Ensino Secundário de Lisboa), at the time led by Nuno Crato. In what she considered a "political act", Gomes formally requested to be released from religious education classes at school.

She began attending the Faculty of Law of the University of Lisbon in 1972, a period marked by the regime's increasing academic repression climate in the aftermath of the student opposition resistance movement of the Academic Crisis in 1962, later revived by the international revolutionary movements of 1968; notably, 1972 was the year of the assassination of fellow law student Ribeiro dos Santos by agents of the political police, and early in the year that followed, the Minister of Education Veiga Simão had "surveillers" (vigilantes; commonly referred to as the "gorillas") placed at the Faculty to enforce police control over students. Ana Gomes soon became active in student political activism against the regime as part of the underground Anti-Colonial Struggle Committees (CLAC; Comités de Luta Anti-Colonial), groups with links to the Re-Organized Movement of the Party of the Proletariat (MRPP; Movimento Reorganizativo do Partido do Proletariado), a clandestine communist party. As an initiation, she was recruited to paint large murals against the Colonial War.

By the time of the Carnation Revolution that overthrew the dictatorial regime in 1974, Ana Gomes had been suspended from the Faculty of Law for "subversive activities"; she had been briefly arrested as an agitator, along with a group of fellow students, in December 1973 and was suspended the following month. At around this time, she was first employed part-time as a waitress at the restaurant Caldeiro owned by a popular actress of the time, Maria José Curado Ribeiro (she worked there alongside Rita Ribeiro and Guida Maria), and then as a translator for the exports department of the Companhia Portuguesa de Congelação (Portuguese Frozen Foods Company). She was present at the Largo do Carmo in the afternoon of the day of the revolution, 25 April 1974, when the forces of the Armed Forces Movement led by Salgueiro Maia and a crowd of civilian supporters besieged the headquarters of the National Republican Guard, where Prime Minister Marcelo Caetano had sought refuge, demanding he cede power. She later went to the Fort of Caxias to witness the release of the political prisoners. She was preparing to marry a fellow law student and political activist, António Monteiro Cardoso, just as the revolution took place, but the marriage had to be postponed to the following month.

She was elected to the Faculty's student council in the electoral list supported by MRPP in November 1974 (alongside Durão Barroso and Garcia Pereira) as well as to the Faculty governing board. After the birth of her daughter in August 1975, she dropped out of law school and quit her job, and focused on working as a translator and interpreter for the press division of the Central Committee of MRPP.

During the political tensions of the "Hot Summer" in 1975, during which the country was on the brink of civil war, culminating with the attempted Communist coup of 25 November, Ana Gomes was on the side of the democratic forces, supporting General Ramalho Eanes and the Socialist Party against the Portuguese Communist Party. Shortly after, however, in January 1976, disillusioned with the party's disbelief in the Portuguese transition to democracy, she abandoned MRPP and active politics. She returned to work as a secretary for an import/export company and resumed her law degree after working hours, finally completing it in 1979. She was working as a teaching assistant at the Faculty of Law and training to become a lawyer under Manuel Figueira, a specialist in public international law and maritime law, when she was challenged by friends João Ramos Pinto and José de Freitas Ferraz to apply for the diplomatic service. She came out on top of all applicants in the concours to gain access to the Ministry of Foreign Affairs.

- 1981 - Community Law Course, National Institute of Administration, Lisbon
- 1988 - Summer course at the International Institute for Human Rights, University of Strasbourg

== Career in the diplomatic service ==
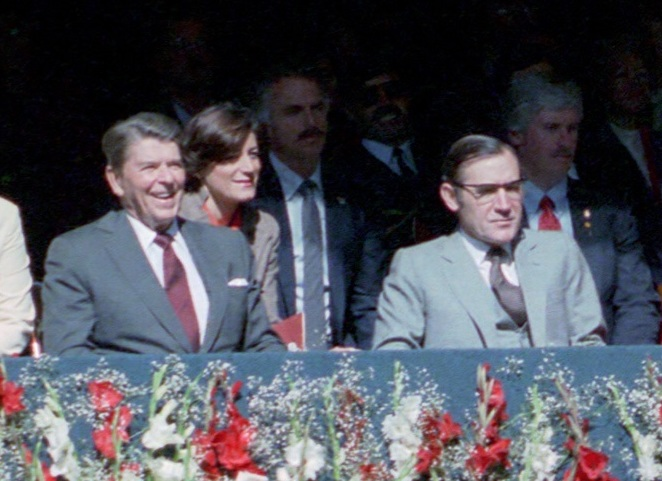
Ana Gomes sitting behind President António Ramalho Eanes, during Ronald Reagan's state visit to Portugal in 1985

Ana Gomes became a career diplomat in 1980 and worked for the department of the Ministry of Foreign Affairs that dealt with the negotiations for the accession of Portugal to the European Economic Community.

During the 1980 presidential election, Gomes was invited to join the National Commission to Support the Reelection of President Eanes (CNARPE; Comissão Nacional de Apoio à Reeleição do Presidente Eanes) as a jurist. In 1982, she was chosen to replace José Filipe Moraes Cabral as the diplomatic advisor to President António Ramalho Eanes, and was in the position until the end of his term in 1986, additionally, she acted as the President's personal interpreter when meeting foreign dignitaries. Among the dossiers she at the time came into contact with was the unfinished business of the decolonisation of East Timor (formerly a Portuguese colonial possession, abandoned after the Carnation Revolution, and subsequently invaded by Indonesia), with which she worked with the President's special advisor for East Timor, former Prime Minister Maria de Lourdes Pintasilgo.

Subsequently, she served in the Portuguese Missions at the United Nations in New York, and also in the Embassies in Geneva, Tokyo and London.

After Indonesian President Suharto's fall from power in 1998, Ana Gomes was part of the diplomatic talks about East Timor between the Portuguese authorities led by Jaime Gama, and Indonesian authorities led by Ali Alatas. When it was decided Portugal would set up an Interests Section in Jakarta (with the Netherlands acting as protecting power), she was chosen to head it. In 2000, with the reestablishment of bilateral relations with Indonesia, Ana Gomes was the first Portuguese Ambassador in Jakarta, having played an important role both in the process leading up to the independence of East Timor and in the reestablishment of diplomatic relations between Portugal and Indonesia. According to ambassador Fernando de Oliveira Neves, as relayed in his work O Negociador (2019), Gomes showed "unusual professionalism" and had an "extraordinary role" in the negotiations, and became a friend of Ali Alatas who came to admire her.

- 1980 - Entered the Diplomatic Service through public competition, Ministry of Foreign Affairs, Lisbon
- 1982-1986 - Diplomatic Advisor of the President of the Republic, General António Ramalho Eanes, Lisbon
- 1986-1989 - First Secretary at the Portuguese Permanent Representation at the UN and other International Organisations (responsible for Human Rights and Humanitarian Law), Geneva
- 1989-1991 - Counsellor at the Portuguese Embassy in Tokyo
- 1991-1994 - Political Counsellor at the Portuguese Embassy in London
- 1992 - Member of the European Union Presidency team working on the Middle East Peace Process
- 1992 -1994 - Member of the Portuguese Delegation at the UN Human Rights Commission in Geneva
- 1994 - Head of the Europe Unit, Political Affairs Department, Ministry of Foreign Affairs, Lisbon
- 1995 -1996 - Chief of Staff of the Secretary of State for European Affairs, Ministry of Foreign Affairs, Lisbon
- 1997-1998 - Coordinator of the Portuguese Delegation at the UN Security Council, New York
- 1999 - 2000 - Director of the Portuguese Interests Section at the Embassy of the Netherlands, Jakarta
- 2000 - 2003 - Ambassador of Portugal in Indonesia, Jakarta

== Political career ==
=== Early beginnings ===
In December 2001, following the resignation of Socialist Prime Minister António Guterres, President Jorge Sampaio dissolved the Assembly of the Republic and called for fresh legislative elections; the Socialist Party, led by Ferro Rodrigues, then lost the 2002 election to Durão Barroso's Social Democratic Party. Ana Gomes was indignant Ferro Rodrigues, who she regarded as an honest politician, lost the election, and joined the Socialist Party the day after the election, on 18 March 2002. Later that same year, she was invited to positions in the party leadership and to join the party's electoral lists for the European Parliament. She was elected Member of the European Parliament in the 2004 election, and served for three terms (reelected in 2009 and in 2014).

Political responsibilities:

- 2002 - Elected Member of the National and Political Committees of the Socialist Party
- 2003 - 2004 - National Secretary for External Relations of the Socialist Party
- 2004 - ongoing - Member of the National Committee of the Socialist Party

=== Member of the European Parliament, 2004–2019 ===
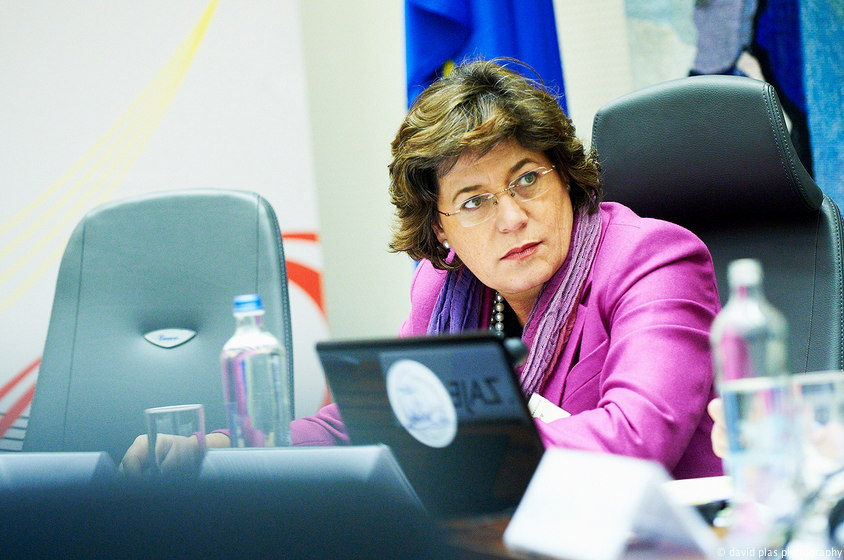
Ana Gomes in 2010, during her term as Member of the European Parliament

In parliament, Gomes served on the Committee on Foreign Affairs (2004–2014), its Subcommittee on Security and Defence (2004–2019), its Subcommittee on Human Rights (2009–2014) and the Committee on Civil Liberties, Justice and Home Affairs (2014–2019).

From 2006 until 2007, Gomes was also a member the Temporary Committee on the alleged use of European countries by the CIA for the transport and illegal detention of prisoners. She authored a 2008 report on China's role in Africa, which criticised Chinese imports of natural resources from the continent. In 2018, she chaired a delegation of the European Parliament to investigate the rule of law and money laundering in Malta.

In addition to her committee assignments, Gomes was part of the parliament's delegations to the ACP–EU Joint Parliamentary Assembly (2004–2009) and for relations with Iraq as well as of the Intergroup on Western Sahara and the Group of Friends European Parliament/East Timor. She also participated in a number of European Parliament missions to Afghanistan, Bosnia-Herzegovina, Chad, China, Democratic Republic of Congo, East Timor, Kosovo, Lebanon, Indonesia (including Aceh), Iraq, Israel, Palestine, Sudan (Darfur), Turkey, USA, etc. She took part in the following Election Observation Missions (EOM):

- Ethiopia (2005) - Head of the EU's EOM
- Democratic Republic of Congo (2006) - Member of the European Parliament's EOM
- East Timor (2007) - Head of the European Parliament's EOM
- Angola (2008) - Member of the European Parliament's EOM

== Political positions and controversy ==
During her time in the European Parliament, Gomes' main areas of activity were: migration, human rights, security and defence, international relations, gender issues and development. In 2010 she signed the Spinelli Group manifesto supporting a federal Europe.

In 2012, Gomes argued she was held at Bahrain International Airport for over seven hours despite holding a diplomatic passport when she tried to enter Bahrain during a stopover on the way to Benghazi, Libya.

Gomes faced accusations of antisemitism for inviting anti-Israel speakers to the European Parliament and allegedly referring to Jewish organizations as a "perverse lobby".

Her activism and membership in the migration focused NGO Friends of Europe were commented upon in an interview by the Romanian prime-minister Viorica Dancila as "totally uninspired". Two requests made by the Deputy Attorney General of Portugal in 2014 and 2017 to waive Ana Gomes' parliamentary immunity with respect to criminal proceedings against her in connection with statements made by her in a television debate and in an interview with the Portuguese Journal "Diário de Noticias" whereas the newspaper article indicated that investigations were under way in relation to the Viana shipyards and in this connection Gomes commented that "something was starting to happen with regard to a case of blatant corruption" have both been decided against by the European Parliament.

=== Defamation law suits ===
==== Mário Ferreira vs. Ana Gomes 2019 ====
In April 2019 Gomes referred on Twitter to the CEO of Douro Azul, Mário Ferreira, as a "crook" in connection with the shipyard case in Viana do Castelo. This case involved allegations of irregularities and corruption in the shipyard industry, which attracted significant media attention and public scrutiny.

Gomes derogatory remarks about Ferreira led to a legal dispute. A court in Porto ultimately ruled in favor of the CEO and found Gomes guilty of defamation and insulting behavior. As a result, she was ordered to pay an indemnity of EUR 10,000 in damages to the CEO as compensation for the harm caused by her statements.

==== Mário Ferreira vs. Ana Gomes 2024 ====
In January 2024, Gomes faced trial at the Bolhão Court in Porto, in a case involving allegations of aggravated defamation against entrepreneur Mário Ferreira.

This marked the fourth legal proceeding initiated by Mário Ferreira against Ana Gomes. The charges stem, once again, from statements made by Gomes X (formerly Twitter) in March 2021, following a report by Expresso detailing Mário Ferreira's investments, including private aviation. This occurred just one month after an OMNI aircraft, purportedly returning to Portugal, was intercepted in Brazil with over 500 kilograms of drugs on board.

In one of her online posts, Ana Gomes wrote:

How interesting! Thanks to Expresso, we discover that the multifaceted shipowner Mário Ferreira is now investing not only in Media Capital/TVI but also in another struggling profit business: private aviation... Will he be flying to Brazil, following the OMNI's footsteps?

During the trial, Gomes emphasized that her intention had been solely to highlight the lack of control at national aerodromes, where various irregularities are known to occur, while at the same accusing Mário Ferreira of being a straw man for foreign investors engaged in money laundering.

Gomes ended up being accquited from her charges she was facing from Mário Ferreira.

== Personal life ==
Ana Gomes civilly married a colleague of the Faculty of Law of the University of Lisbon, António Monteiro Cardoso (whom she called "Toné") on 20 May 1974, shortly after the Carnation Revolution, in a register office in Alcântara, Lisbon. The couple then had lunch in a nearby restaurant, Galão, with their parents, the groom's sister, and the best man, António Luís Cotrim. According to Gomes, the whole affair was brief and there was not even a picture taken of the event ("we did not care for such bourgeois vices"), as the couple were then busy actively engaged with political work with MRPP party as the country was transitioning to democracy. The marriage was happy and produced one daughter, Joana, but was ultimately broken off about one year later.

She later married fellow diplomat António Franco in 1994, whom she had met in 1983 while working for President António Ramalho Eanes. Franco died in 2020.

She currently lives in Cascais.

== Electoral history ==
=== Sintra City Council election, 2009 ===
Ballot: 11 October 2009
Party	Candidate	Votes	%	Seats	+/−
PSD/CDS–PP/PPM/MPT	Fernando Seara	62,314	45.3	6	±0
PS	Ana Gomes	46,458	33.7	4	±0
CDU	José Baptista Alves	15,293	11.1	1	±0
BE	André Marona Beja	8,121	5.9	0	±0
PCTP/MRPP	José Mestre	1,497	1.1	0	±0
Blank/Invalid ballots		4,016	2.9	–	–
Turnout		137,699	47.92	11	±0
Source: Autárquicas 2009

=== Presidential election, 2021 ===
Ballot: 24 January 2021
Candidate	Votes	%
Marcelo Rebelo de Sousa	2,531,692	60.7
Ana Gomes	540,823	13.0
André Ventura	497,746	11.9
João Ferreira	179,764	4.3
Marisa Matias	165,127	4.0
Tiago Mayan Gonçalves	134,991	3.2
Vitorino Silva	123,031	3.0
Blank/Invalid ballots	85,182	–
Turnout	4,258,356	39.26
Source: Comissão Nacional de Eleições

== Publications ==
Numerous articles published in the Courrier Internacional, Diário de Notícias, Expresso, Jornal de Leiria, Jornal de Notícias, Público and Visão.

Book Todo-o-Terreno - 4 Anos de Reflexões (RCP Edições, November 2008, Lisbon)

== Other activities ==
- Member of the Student Union, Classical University of Lisbon, Lisbon (1974–1976)
- Member of the Board of the Union of Portuguese Diplomats (1982–1986 and 1994–1996)
- Deputy-Chair of Parliamentarians for Nuclear Nonproliferation and Disarmament, European Parliament Section
- Member of the Portuguese chapter of Amnesty International
- Member of International Development NGOs CIDAC and Engenho & Obra
- Member of the Portuguese Association of Women Jurists

== Recognition ==
=== National orders ===
- Grand Cross of the Military Order of Christ (9 June 2000)
- Grand Officer of the Order of Prince Henry (18 March 1986)
- Commander of the Order of Merit (27 April 1993)

=== Foreign orders ===
- Insígnia of the Order of Timor-Leste (2009)

=== Awards ===
- Ruth Pearce Award for Human Rights by Human Rights NGOs, Geneva, 1989
- Personality of the Year Award - 1999, Expresso weekly newspaper, Lisbon, 1999
- Personality of the Year Award - 1999, Association of International Correspondents, Lisbon, 1999
- Human Rights Award of the Assembly of the Republic (Portuguese parliament), 1999
- Activist of the Year - 2008, The Parliament Magazine, Brussels, 2008
