= CCJO René Cassin =

Non-governmental organisation

CCJO René Cassin – more commonly known as René Cassin – is a charitable human rights NGO that works to promote and protect universal human rights, drawing on Jewish experiences and values. The organisation does this by campaigning for change in defined human rights areas through a combination of advocacy, policy analysis, public campaigning and education and building the capacity of activists and lawyers to promote and protect human rights. The organisation works in human rights areas that bear some relation to Jewish experience, such as discrimination, asylum, and genocide. The organisation holds special consultative status with the United Nations as a constituent organisation of the Consultative Council of Jewish Organisation (CCJO). The CCJO's first President was René Cassin, a principal drafter of the UN Declaration of Human Rights, who was awarded the Nobel Peace Prize in 1968 in recognition of his work for human rights as a jurist, academic and statesman. The CCJO has been an active supporter of efforts to increase the effectiveness of the UN's human rights treaties and institutional mechanisms in the intervening decades. From the 1940s to the 1970s it was involved in the creation of the United Nations human rights instruments, which form the basis of the UN's human rights activities today.

CCJO René Cassin negotiated the first-ever reference to group / collective rights in a United Nations Instrument (the Basic Principles on Rights to Victims). The principles were adopted by the UN General Assembly in November 2005. The group has also campaigned on refugee rights, genocide prevention, religious freedom, racial equality and international restitution issues. René Cassin also offers human rights education programmes and training sessions.

The group is primarily focused in the UK, but has supporters throughout Europe, particularly in France.

Danny Silverstone is the organisation's current (2022) Chair, and Mia Hasenson-Gross its Executive Director.

The organisation was originally chaired by Alexander Goldberg who remains as the main delegate to the UN Human Rights Council and Daniel Kingsley.

== Aims ==
René Cassin's Vision is of a world where:

- everyone fully enjoys all their human rights as enshrined in the Universal Declaration of Human Rights
- members of the Jewish community are actively engaged in promoting and protecting these rights, both within the community and in concert with stakeholders outside of the community.

René Cassin's Mission is to promote and protect the universal rights of all people, drawing on Jewish experiences and values, by:

- remaking a compelling case for human rights values
- campaigning for change in defined human rights areas through a combination of advocacy, policy analysis, public campaigning and education
- leading and growing a group of committed Jewish human rights advocates

== History ==
In 2000, Clemens Nathan and other figures with experience of human rights work in the Consultative Council of Jewish Organisations (CCJO) took a group of young professionals to the former United Nations Commission on Human Rights (which has since been reformed into the Human Rights Council) in Geneva where they were exposed to the existing spectrum of Jewish voices focused on the importance of universal human rights. They were inspired to set up CCJO René Cassin (RC), aiming to provide Jewish voices on international human rights at the international and national levels. Nathan continued to support and inspire their developing work, seeking to draw new professional talent into the work done by the CCJO through the United Nations and in other human rights fora.

Since establishing its base in the United Kingdom at this time, RC has grown and professionalised. In 2003, RC began to engage with the Jewish community in the UK to promote awareness of human rights and encourage activism, by hosting a series of high-level public events, including panel debates and conferences. Speakers at these events included Dame Ruth Deech, Dr Indarjit Singh and Peter Tatchell.

In 2005, RC launched an education programme for secondary schools in the UK on genocide, immigration and rights of the child. In 2005 alone, this programme reached over 3000 Jewish secondary school children. The organisation continued to prioritise education, developing education packs for teachers, and working with five major Jewish secondary schools to educate on the escalating situation in Darfur, Sudan.

RC continued to take delegations to the United Nations Human Rights Council with the support of the CCJO. In 2005 as part of a campaign for restitution for victims of genocide, RC representatives negotiated the first-ever reference to group rights in a United Nations Instrument (the Basic Principles on Rights to Victims).

In 2007, RC launched the Jewish Human Rights Network in the UK to bring Jewish people together to speak out for human rights, with the support of the Chief Rabbi of the United Kingdom, the Attorney General of the United Kingdom and representatives from across the UK Jewish and human rights community.

In its early years, RC was chaired by two young lawyers, Alexander Goldberg and Daniel Kingsley. The group employed its first full-time Director, Clive Gabay in 2005, who was succeeded by Sarah Kaiser in 2006. Kaiser continued to prioritise educational work, developing multiple resources and educational programmes focused on Judaism and human rights, and holding events. In October 2010, Kaiser was succeeded by Simone Abel, an attorney with previous experience at Human Rights Watch, New York, and two leading international law firms. In late 2011, Shauna Leven, also a lawyer, joined RC as Programme Manager in 2011 and was appointed Director in 2013. Leven left René Cassin in December 2014 and was replaced as Director in June 2015 by Mia Hasenson-Gross.

Since Abel's appointment, the organisation has focused increasingly on advocacy work in addition to its educational offerings. The organisation began working on issues pertaining to discrimination against Gypsies, Travellers and Roma in UK and Europe in 2010, and modern slavery and support of domestic UK human rights protections in 2011, developing policy papers, advocacy strategies and educational resources. The organisation has increasingly worked in collaboration with other organisations to achieve its advocacy goals in the most efficient and effective way possible.

In recent years (2019-2022), RC has expanded with additional workstreams on hate speech, mass immigration, women's rights, and social justice.

== Issues and campaigns ==
- Genocide and Crimes against Humanity Since 2019, RC's work in this area has focussed on the Chinese government's repression of Uyghur Muslims in East Turkestan (Xinjiang Province). RC has worked with the UK office of the World Uyghur Congress, calling on UK government to recognise China's action as genocide, highlighting link between western companies and forced Uyghur labour, and working to label Beijing 2022 Winter Olympics as 'the Genocide Games'
- Asylum and Detention RC is concerned that the United Kingdom's policy and practice of detention infringes the human rights of many asylum seekers. The organisation frames the detention of asylum seekers as a human rights issue and campaigns against indefinite detention, the detention of vulnerable people and the Detained Fast Track system as violations of human rights standards and the inherent dignity of the individual.
- Discrimination against Gypsies, Roma, and Travellers Since 2011 RC has been campaigning against discrimination facing these 'chronically excluded' communities.
- Hate Speech RC's 'Cut It Out' campaign aims to counter discriminatory language in public discourse, mainly in the mainstream media; and its 'Reach Out' campaign provides solidarity with groups facing hate speech and hate crime, as well as practical help garnered from long experience of tackling anti-Semitism.
- Slavery and Human Trafficking RC seeks to end modern slavery through education and advocacy. In 2011 it published a Haggadah Companion highlighting the ongoing issue of modern-day slavery and engaging supporters in positive activities to: raise awareness, change consumer behaviour and join their advocacy work. RC also advised various corporations as to what steps they could take in order to ensure that they avoid indirectly contributing to modern-day slavery or increasing the likelihood of the exploitation of human beings during the 2012 London Olympics.
- Working to protect and promote the Human Rights Act RC supports and advocates for the retention of the Act. In 2012 it hosted a panel discussion with guest speakers Professor Francesca Klug OBE and Sir Vernon Bogdanor CBE about the importance of retaining the Act and also prepared a submission to the Commission on the Bill of Rights Consultation.
- Women's Rights RC launched this new workstream in 2020 in response to endemic inequality and misogyny.
- Social Justice In 2021, RC began work on a Right to Food, inspired by Article 25 of the Universal Declaration of Human Rights.

== Education ==
RC has been committed to providing transformative human rights education since 2003, and initially developed a wide range of resources aimed at secondary school children. In 2008, on the Global Day for Darfur, the group hosted its first full-day conference entitled ‘What’s so Jewish about Human Rights?’ and the event has become an annual fixture.

The organisation runs the René Cassin Fellowship Programme, (RCFP) which brings together Jewish professionals to explore a range of human rights issues through a uniquely Jewish lens. It provides fellows with the knowledge, skills and contacts needed to enhance their activism in the areas of social justice, international human rights or related fields. The year-long RCFP holds monthly seminars with a core faculty member on a curriculum specially developed for the fellowship. The fellows also participate in periodic visits by leading human rights lawyers, academics, activists, and communal leaders.

In 2019, RC established a 'Human Rights Ambassador Programme' – a 'lite' version of the Fellowship Programme, aimed at providing sixth formers and undergraduates with a crash course in human rights issues and campaigning expertise.

== See also ==
- International Institute of Human Rights
