= Adolfo Mesquita Nunes =

Portuguese jurist and politician

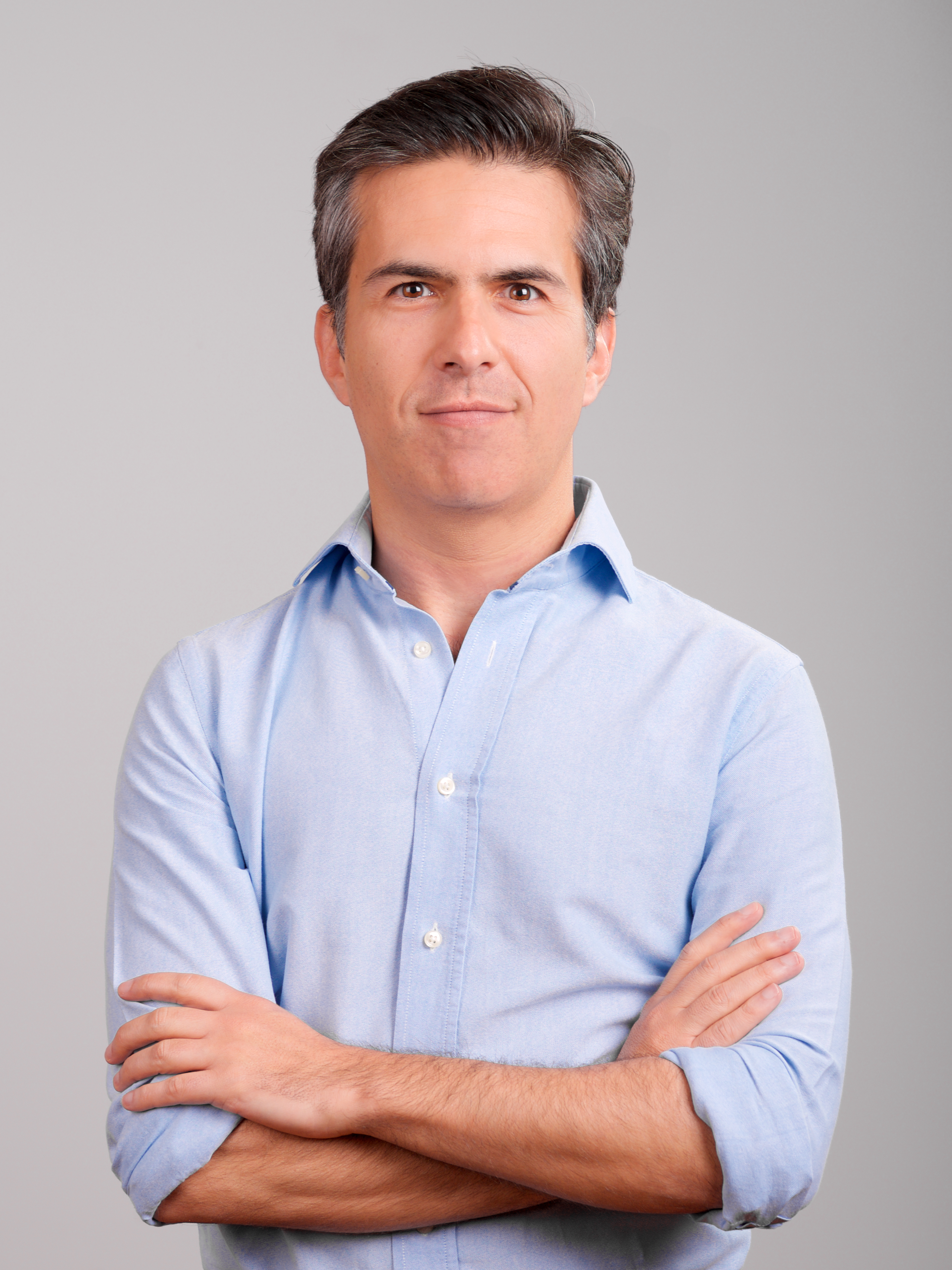

Secretary of State for Tourism
- In office 1 February 2013 – 26 November 2015
- Prime Minister: Pedro Passos Coelho
- Preceded by: Cecília Meireles
- Succeeded by: Ana Mendes Godinho

Member of the Assembly of the Republic
- In office 20 June 2011 – 1 February 2013
- Constituency: Lisbon

Personal details
- Born: Adolfo Miguel Baptista Mesquita Nunes; 29 November 1977 (age 48) Lisbon, Portugal
- Party: Independent (2021–present); CDS–PP (1997–2021)
- Occupation: Lawyer

Adolfo Miguel Baptista Mesquita Nunes (born 29 November 1977) is a Portuguese jurist and politician. While part of CDS – People's Party, he served as Member of the Assembly of the Republic from 2011 to 2013, and as Secretary of State for Tourism in Pedro Passos Coelho's first and second governments from 2013 to 2015.

In 2021, he announced he was rescinding his party membership, citing differences with party leader Francisco Rodrigues dos Santos and the controversy surrounding the 2022 CDS – People's Party leadership election.

== Biography ==
Adolfo Mesquita Nunes was born in Lisbon but raised in Covilhã with his paternal family. He earned his bachelor's degree in Law from the Catholic University of Portugal, and later a master's degree in Legal and Political Sciences in 2008 from the University of Lisbon.

He became a member of CDS – People's Party in 1997. As a Member of Parliament, he became notable for being the only in the CDS caucus who voted for adoption by same-sex couples in 2012, and for being a member of the parliamentary committee on the international bailout programme in the wake of the 2010–2014 Portuguese financial crisis. As Secretary of State for Tourism under Minister of Economy António Pires de Lima, he promoted deregulation of the sector.

In 2020, Adolfo Mesquita Nunes was put forward as a potential candidate in the 2021 Portuguese presidential election, with the support of some in the moderate right-wing of the Social Democratic Party and the Liberal Initiative, as well as his own party. Citing lack of support from his party's leadership and refusing to run "just to oppose someone", Mesquita Nunes declined entering the race.

In January 2021, following the presidential election, Mesquita Nunes called for an extraordinary congress of his party so that he could challenge the leader, Francisco Rodrigues dos Santos, who he accused of having been steering the party toward political irrelevance. After Rodrigues dos Santos succeeded in having the party structure approve a motion of confidence, by a slim margin, Mesquita Nunes gave up the leadership challenge.

On 30 October 2021, Mesquita Nunes announced his decision to give up his CDS-PP party affiliation, following the controversial internal decision to postpone a party leadership election so that it would only take place after the snap legislative election that will take place because of the parliamentary rejection of the Socialist minority government budget for 2022. On his public announcement, Mesquita Nunes called the decision "illegal", and accused leader Francisco Rodrigues dos Santos of having turned the party into a conservative monolith with a lack of real internal diversity, and denounced the "party's new priorities" of being an "accusatory finger" of "so-called Christian purity".

== Private life ==
Mesquita Nunes publicly came out in an interview to the newspaper Expresso in 2018, saying he had not done so before because he found such an announcement unnecessary; while calling it as a private matter, he also said he had never made any attempt to conceal it, citing an incident during the campaign for the 2017 local elections in which one of his political campaign billboards in Covilhã was spray painted with the word "gay" and he specifically asked for it not to be taken down as it wasn't calumnious.

== Electoral results ==
=== Covilhã City Council election, 2017 ===
Ballot: 1 October 2017
Party	Candidate	Votes	%	Seats	+/−
PS	Vítor Pereira	13,437	46.4	5	+2
Ind.	Carlos Pinto	5,257	18.2	1	new
CDS–PP	Adolfo Mesquita Nunes	4,371	15.1	1	new
PSD/PPM	Marco Baptista	2,135	7.4	0	–1
CDU	Mónica Ramôa	1,799	6.2	0	–1
BE	João Corono	630	2.2	0	±0
Blank/Invalid ballots		1,326	4.6	–	–
Turnout		28,955	61.86	7	±0
Source: Comissão Nacional de Eleições
