= Sudan Organisation Against Torture =

Sudan Organisation Against Torture (SOAT) is a human rights group based in London, which works to combat human rights violations in Sudan, particularly in the Dafur region.
