= Alexander Goldberg =

Chaplain, barrister and human rights activist

Rabbi Alexander Goldberg
- Title: Dean of Religious Life and Belief, Coordinating and Jewish Chaplain of the University of Surrey

Personal life
- Born: 1974 (age 51–52) Guildford, England
- Website: www.alexgoldberg.eu

Religious life
- Religion: Judaism
- Denomination: Modern Orthodox Judaism

Jewish leader
- Position: Dean of the College of Chaplains / Coordinating Chaplain / Rabbi
- Organisation: University of Surrey

Alexander Barnett Goldberg (born 1974) is the Dean of Religious Life and Belief, Coordinating and the Jewish Chaplain to the University of Surrey, England, a rabbi, barrister, and human rights activist.

== Biography ==
Goldberg's family originates from Ireland, and he has written and spoken on his Irish Jewish identity.

Goldberg has spoken at the United Nations on religious and racial discrimination, as well as calling for the UN to take action on the situation in the Darfur region of Sudan and successfully campaigned for the inclusion of group rights within the UN Basic Principles on the Right to Remedy and Reparations. He went on to collaborate with the UN and pilot their Faith for Rights programme.

Goldberg was the first rabbi to be appointed Coordinating Chaplain to a European and British university in April 2019 when he became Dean of Religious Life and Belief and head of the College of Chaplains at the University of Surrey leading a team of 15 Chaplains and 10 Religious Life and Belief Associates. In addition, he is occasional and visiting Chaplain at Princeton University, New Jersey.

Goldberg was appointed Chief Executive of the London Jewish Forum in July 2008, having been the Community Issues Director at the Board of Deputies of British Jews. In June 2007, Goldberg was involved in trying to find a solution to a crisis in the orthodox Jewish community over marriage visas. The Home Office proposed to introduce measures that would raise the age limit for international marriage visas from 18 to 21, which would impact on the strictly orthodox community. He was part of a delegation that met with the immigration minister in March 2008 to express their concerns over the proposal.

Goldberg helped raised several millions pounds for both the University of Surrey, a Jewish school and the United Synagogue and has been part of a team seeking to build a multifaith centre at the University of Surrey. The building was envisaged to be the first building in Britain to have a synagogue, mosque and chapel built separately under one roof and is designed to have facilities for six major faiths. The centre obtained planning permission in November 2007. The team presented their work to Queen Elizabeth II in November 2011, whereon she remarked that the University 'is leading the way'. The university has since renovated and rebuilt the centre in 2018 whilst opening up multiple hubs on campus including a Pastoral Care hub and a new faith hub on its second Manor Park campus alongside the university’s pre-existing Islamic Prayer Room which has been on campus for a number of years.

Goldberg now runs the Religious Life and Belief Centre as the University's Coordinating Chaplain and Dean of Religious Life and Belief.

Goldberg was chair of the Faith Forum for London and part of the team that organised the Mayor of London's Faith Conference in 2011. At the Board of Deputies he spoke out against a proposed Bill that would have seen the state imposition of mandatory quotas on voluntary aided faith schools and in support of the interfaith coalition opposing it.

Goldberg was appointed Jewish Chaplain to the 2012 Summer Olympics in London and led a consortium 2012 Hour Against Hate that was commended by London 2012 and awarded recognition to use the Olympic Peace Truce symbol. He chaired the Football Association's Faith in Football group and attended an anti-discrimination in football summit hosted by the prime minister at Downing Street in February 2012. In 2019, he initiated a project that saw a building of a Sukkah in Wembley Stadium. He has served on two Department for Education Ministerial Steering Committees

Goldberg was the first rabbi to visit Lebanon's second city of Tripoli in 2019, having been part of a delegation of religious leaders sponsored by the European Union.

Goldberg previously contributed to The Guardian newspaper, where he defended religious courts. He is a panelist on BBC One's The Big Questions. He regularly contributes and cohosts the Sunday Morning Breakfast Show on BBC Surrey and BBC Sussex. He is one of the regular contributor’s to BBC Radio 2's Pause for Thought.
