= CIDAC =

Mexican think tank

CIDAC	
Foundation year:	1984
President:	Luis Rubio
Managing Director:	Verónica Baz
Location:	Mexico City
Website:	www.cidac.org

Centro de Investigacion para el Desarrollo A.C. is a non-profit independent think tank devoted to the study and interpretation of Mexican reality and the presentation of viable proposals for the development of Mexico in the medium and long term. It formulates proposals that: contribute to strengthening the rule of law and creating conditions which encourage the economic and social development of Mexico; that enrich public opinion; and that contain the elements necessary to be useful in society's decision-making process.

CIDAC offers the results of its work to the general public as well as to decision makers like congressmen, government officials at the federal, state and municipal level, business people and union leaders.

CIDAC was founded in 1984, when the Institute of Bank and Finance (IBAFIN) was transformed to a center for research in the area of economic development.

== Activities ==
CIDAC's core activities have included weekly analytical reports, books, magazine and journal articles, continual participation in debates, study groups, and international forums on key policy issues.

== History ==
In 1980, the Bank and Finances Institute (IBAFIN) was founded as an entity dedicated to the instruction of executives in the financial sector (public, private, banks and companies). By 1984, IBAFIN was transformed into a research center in the field of economic development, giving way to the Center of Investigation for Development A.C, fund, CIDAC (by its Spanish acronym), changing its management, from an institution essentially dedicated to teaching to one oriented toward investigation. The creation of CIDAC came about in a context in which it was perceived that the country would face a great process of change and structural economic reforms. However, the pillars of the old political regime (corporative and control over the press) remained, the political opposition continued to be incipient and the social sector was just emerging. In this situation, CIDAC emerged as an institution of professionals that would produce high-quality studies, with the objective of developing a base of support for reforms and, in its immediate future, for the economic changes that would be required to achieve the nation's recovery. The emphasis on development that was included in the name of the organization had as its purpose the circumscription of all the themes that would be relevant for the process of change of Mexican society. Since then, CIDAC has published more than 70 books, thousands of articles in newspapers, magazines, and specialized publications and its investigation team has been present in the most critical debates over the reform of public policy that pertains to the development of Mexico.

== Publications ==
CIDAC's publishes newsletters such as CIDAC Weekly Political Analysis and CIDAC recommends. CIDAC also develops weekly podcasts about current events in Mexico. The institution has produced more than 40 books since its founding. Among its more recent studies are:

- 3 Dilemmas. Diagnosis for Mexico's Energy Future
- 8 priority crimes. CIDAC 2012 Criminal Index
- 11 opportunities - Proposals for a new government

== Funds ==
CIDAC does not receive funds from any political party nor the Mexican government. The Governing Board, integrated by well-known members of the academic and business communities of Mexico, along with public officials, ensures the operation and performance of the institution's funds.

Each of our projects is financed through grants provided by institutions such as:

- The Ford Foundation
- Friedrich Naumann Foundation
- John D. and Catherine T. MacArthur Foundation
- The William and Flora Hewlett Foundation
- Konrad Adenauer Foundation
- The Tinker Foundation
- Inter-American Development Bank
