= Tiago Mayan Gonçalves =

Portuguese politician

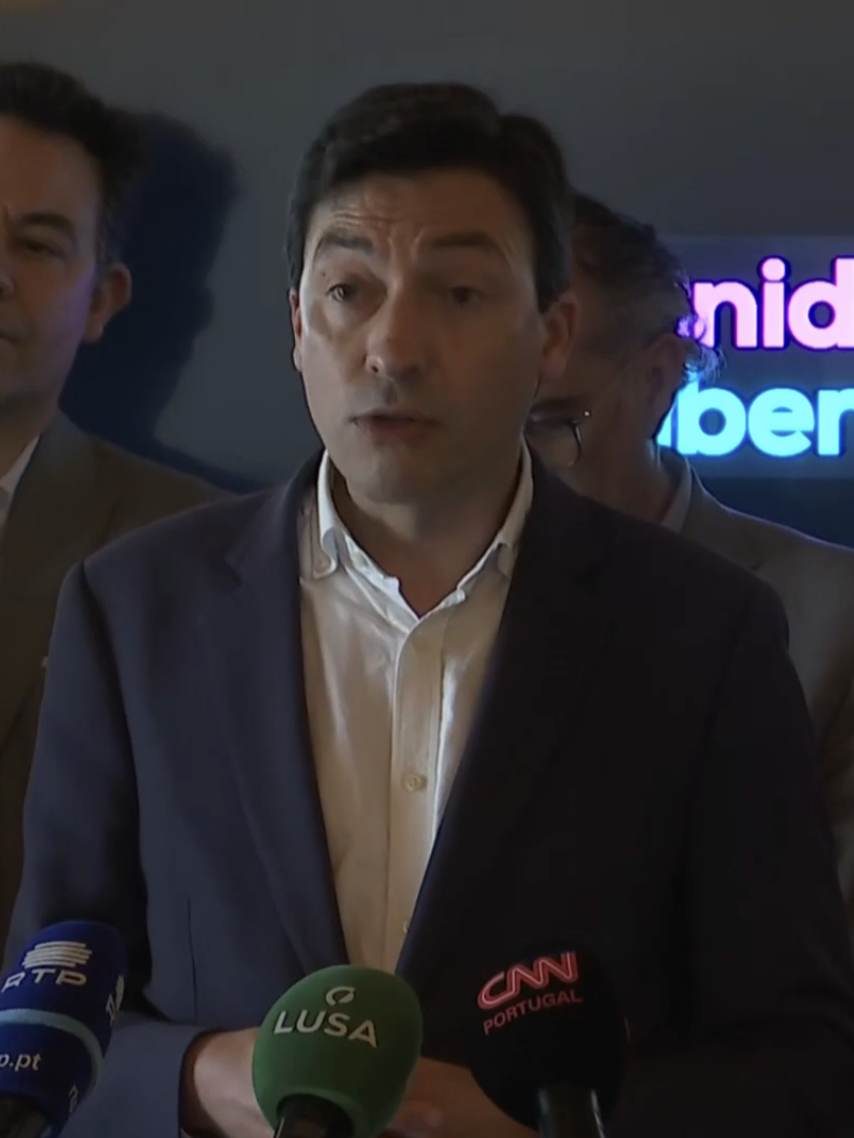
- Mayan in 2024

President of the Parish of Aldoar, Foz do Douro e Nevogilde
- In office 26 September 2021 – 9 November 2024

Personal details
- Born: 5 March 1977 (age 49) Porto, Portugal
- Party: IL (until 2025)
- Education: Catholic University of Portugal
- Occupation: Lawyer • Politician

Tiago Mayan Gonçalves (born 5 March 1977) is a former Portuguese politician who represented Liberal Initiative.

== Background and personal life ==
Mayan was born in Porto, on 5 March 1977. By profession, he is a lawyer and studied at Catholic University of Portugal. He is the son of chemical engineers. His father worked in business management, and his mother was a researcher and teacher.

In his free time, Mayan has been volunteering at Reefood since 2014. He is also an avid sailor.

== Political career ==
Mayan was one of the founders of Liberal Initiative.

In the 2021 Presidential election Mayan received 134,484 votes (3.22%).

In that year's local elections, he was elected President of the Parish of Aldoar, Foz do Douro e Nevogilde, in Porto, as a part of Rui Moreira's independent movement.
