= 2026 Portuguese presidential election =

- 18 January 2026 (first round); 8 February 2026 (second round) (Note: Postponed to 15 February 2026 in the municipalities of Alcácer do Sal, Arruda dos Vinhos, Golegã, and parts of the municipalities of Cartaxo, Leiria, Rio Maior, Salvaterra de Magos, and Santarém.)
- Opinion polls
- Registered: 11,025,823 (▲1.64pp)
- Turnout: 52.39% (first round) ▲13.13pp 50.03% (second round)
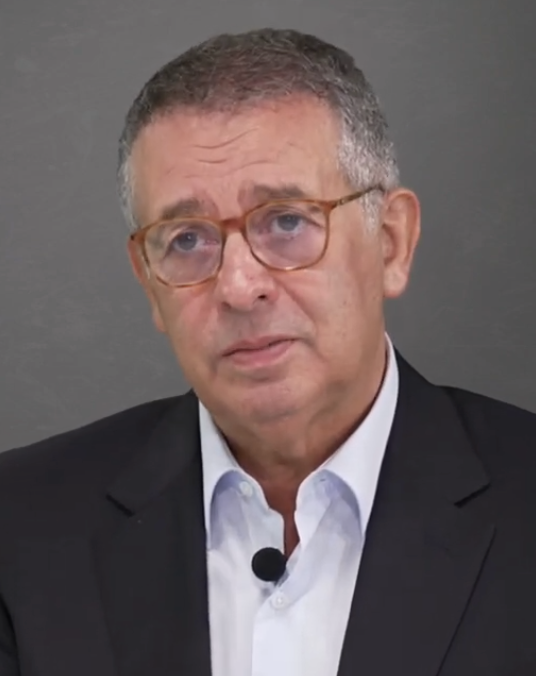

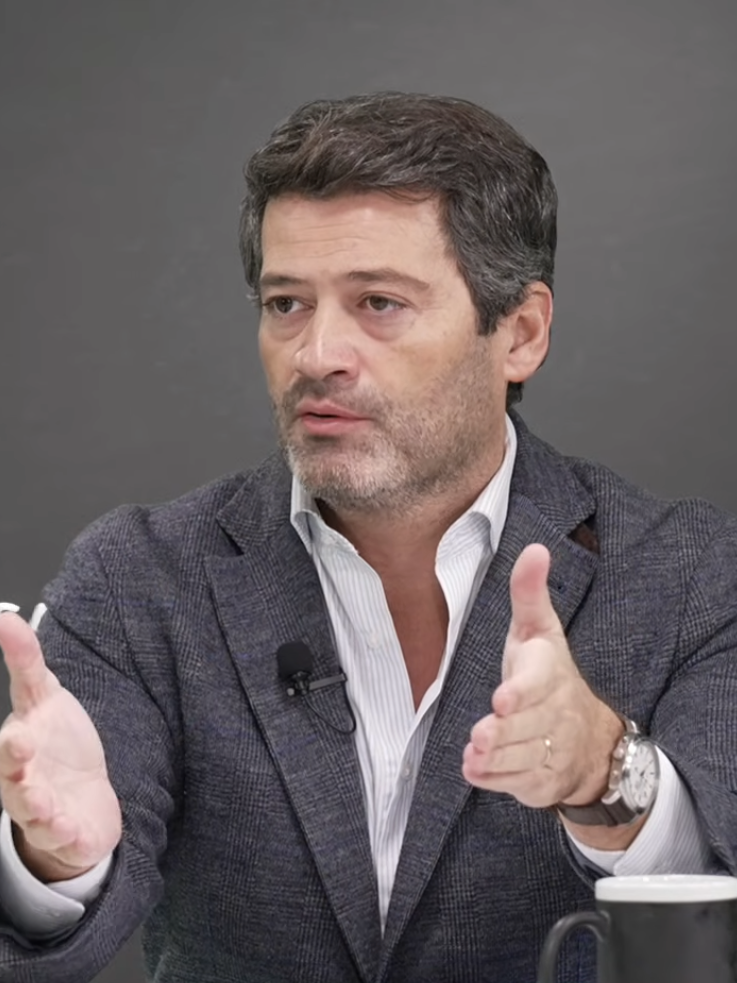
| Candidate | António José; Seguro | André Ventura |
| Party | PS Supported by: Volt | CH |
| Popular vote | 3,502,613 | 1,737,950 |
| Percentage | 66.84% | 33.16% |

Seguro
20–30%
30–40%
40–50%
50–60%
60–70%
70–80%
80–90%
Ventura
20–30%
30–40%
40–50%
50–60%
Mendes
20–30%
30–40%
President before election
Marcelo Rebelo de Sousa
PSD
Elected President
António José Seguro
PS

Presidential elections were held in Portugal in 2026, with a first round on 18 January and a second round on 8 February. The incumbent president, Marcelo Rebelo de Sousa, supported by the Social Democratic Party (PSD), had already served two consecutive terms, so he was not eligible for re-election.

Fourteen potential candidates submitted formal applications, of which eleven were certified to appear on the ballot paper. They included the former coordinator of Portugal's COVID-19 vaccination task force Henrique Gouveia e Melo, who ran as an independent, and former PSD leader Luís Marques Mendes. The Socialist Party (PS) supported the campaign of their former party leader António José Seguro. André Ventura, the leader of Chega (CH), also stood. Other candidates supported by parties were the MEPs João Cotrim de Figueiredo for Liberal Initiative (IL) and Catarina Martins for Left Bloc (BE); the former MP António Filipe for the Portuguese Communist Party (PCP); and the MP Jorge Pinto for LIVRE (L).

In the first round, Seguro (PS) won the most votes with 31%, while Ventura (CH) came second with 23.5%. Because no candidate reached the required 50% threshold, Seguro and Ventura faced each other in a second round run-off on 8 February. This was only the second time that a direct Portuguese presidential election went to a second round, after the 1986 election.

Candidates eliminated in the first round included Cotrim de Figueiredo (IL) who came third with 16%, and Gouveia e Melo (independent) fourth with 12%. Marques Mendes (PSD) received 11%, the lowest in Portuguese history for a government supported presidential candidate, surpassing the previous negative record set by Mário Soares in 2006. Catarina Martins (BE) received 2%, the lowest for a female candidate in a presidential election, while António Filipe (PCP) received less than 2%, the Communists' worst result in a presidential election.

Overall voter turnout (including overseas) in the first round was 52 percent, thirteen percentage points higher than the previous election. In Portugal itself, turnout was 61.50 percent, an increase of 16.1 percentage points compared to 2021, and the highest since 2006. Seguro defeated Ventura by a wide margin on the second round, 67% to 33%, and became the most voted candidate ever in a Portuguese election by surpassing Soares' 1991 vote total record. Overall turnout in the second round dropped slightly to 50%. António José Seguro was sworn in as President on 9 March 2026.

== Background ==
Marcelo Rebelo de Sousa was re-elected in January 2021, securing nearly 61 percent of the votes in the first round. He took the oath of office on 9 March 2021, and continued the period of cohabitation with Socialist Party Prime Minister António Costa, which lasted until April 2024. This cohabitation ended after the March 2024 election, which saw Luís Montenegro, from the Social Democratic Party (the same party as the President), nominated as prime minister. During his second term, Marcelo Rebelo de Sousa suffered a considerable decline in his public approval according to polling, following a series of controversies, such as gaffes surrounding abuses in the Catholic Church or regarding his opinions on prime ministers, a case involving his son, and splashing the president, related to an alleged irregular and privileged access to an expensive healthcare treatment for twins of Brazilian origin, and the succession of parliamentary dissolutions, three in just under 4 years, the most contentious being the 2024 one, after Costa's resignation following Operation Influencer, and with the president rejecting alternative solutions proposed by the ruling Socialist Party. The relationship between Marcelo and the two prime ministers during his second term was also tense, ranging from disagreements with Costa over controversies in his government, to a distant and cold one with Montenegro.

Within the Portuguese political system, the president serves as the head of state with primarily ceremonial duties, though the president holds some political influence and can dissolve Parliament during a crisis. The president resides at the Belém Palace in Lisbon. Since the Carnation Revolution, all Portuguese presidents have been re-elected for a second term and never tried a third, with one exception: Mário Soares (PS), who sought a non-consecutive third term in the 2006 presidential election but lost. Thus, every president since 1976 has served exactly two terms.

=== Pre-campaign ===
Admiral Henrique Gouveia e Melo, who rose to prominence as the coordinator of Portugal's COVID-19 Vaccination Task Force, quickly emerged as a leading candidate in early polling as far back as mid-2022. Over the next two years, he repeatedly oscillated in his public statements regarding his intentions to run, fueling speculation. By November 2024, having declined to be renominated as Chief of the Naval Staff, Gouveia e Melo started preparing his path for the presidency, signaling the support from local politicians and stating that he didn't want the support of any party. He ultimately announced his candidacy in May 2025.

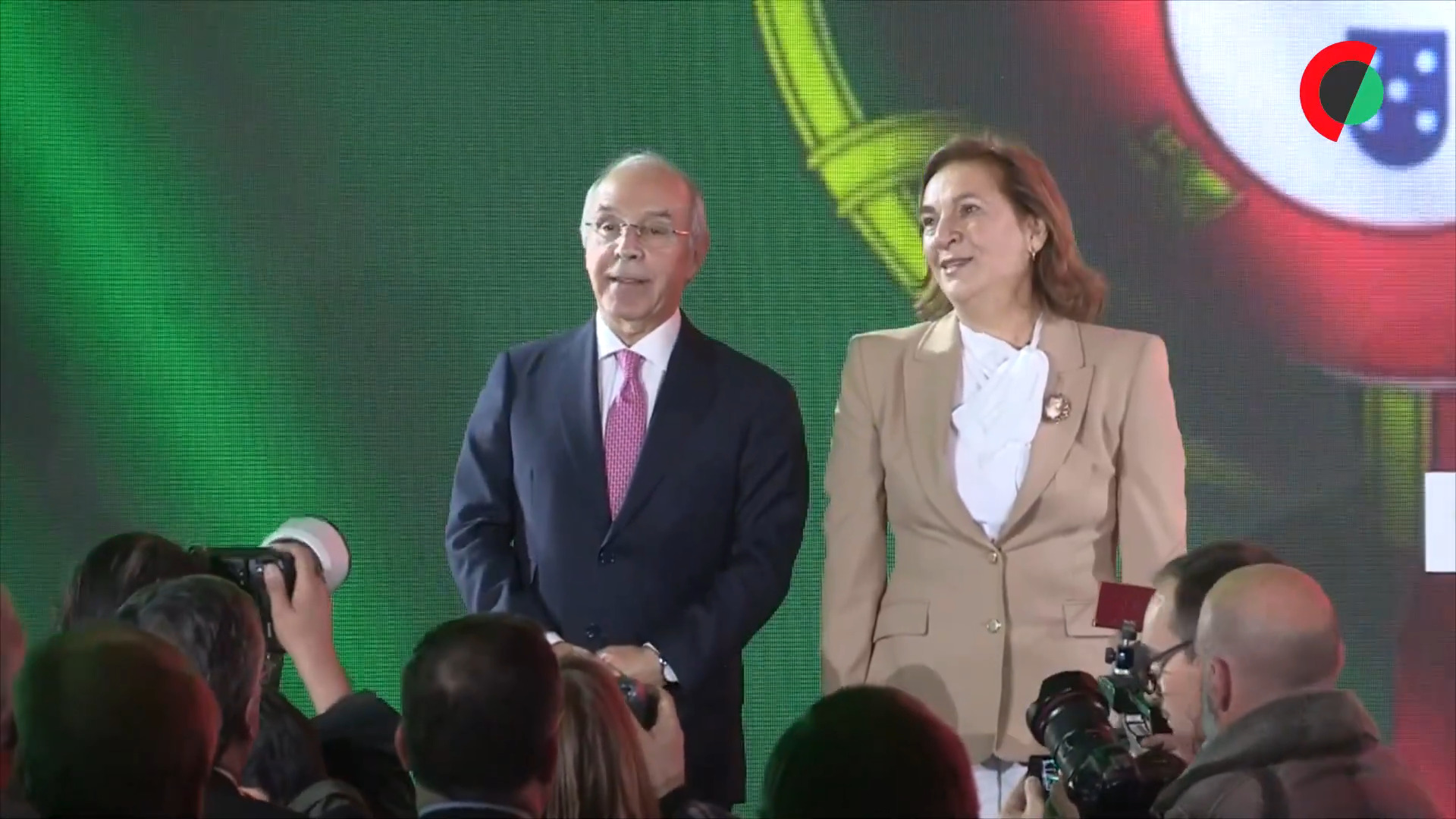
Luís Marques Mendes and his wife at his campaign launch, 11 February 2025.

On the traditional centre-right, the Social Democratic Party had several high-profile potential candidates for the presidency, including the former prime ministers Pedro Passos Coelho and Pedro Santana Lopes, as well as former party leaders Luís Marques Mendes and Rui Rio, and former Minister Leonor Beleza. Among these, Marques Mendes soon emerged as the leading candidate, announcing his candidacy in February 2025 and receiving the support of the party in May 2025. Meanwhile, the CDS–PP, the junior partner of PSD in the AD coalition, hoped that the former leader and former deputy prime minister, Paulo Portas, would run but, after he declined to seek the presidency, CDS declared support for Marques Mendes, despite internal divisions.

On the centre-left, Pedro Nuno Santos announced in January 2024, after being elected as Secretary-general of the Socialist Party, that he wanted the party to support a presidential candidate in the 2026 election, as the last time the PS had supported a candidate was Manuel Alegre in the 2011 presidential election. Multiple socialist figures soon emerged as potential contenders, but, as the political landscape changed, many of these started losing momentum. Former president of the Assembly of the Republic, Augusto Santos Silva, was considered as a strong candidate until he lost his seat as an MP in the March 2024 legislative election. The governor of the Bank of Portugal, Mário Centeno, was also considered as a strong contender, due to his popularity as Minister of Finance, until he declined to run in January 2025.

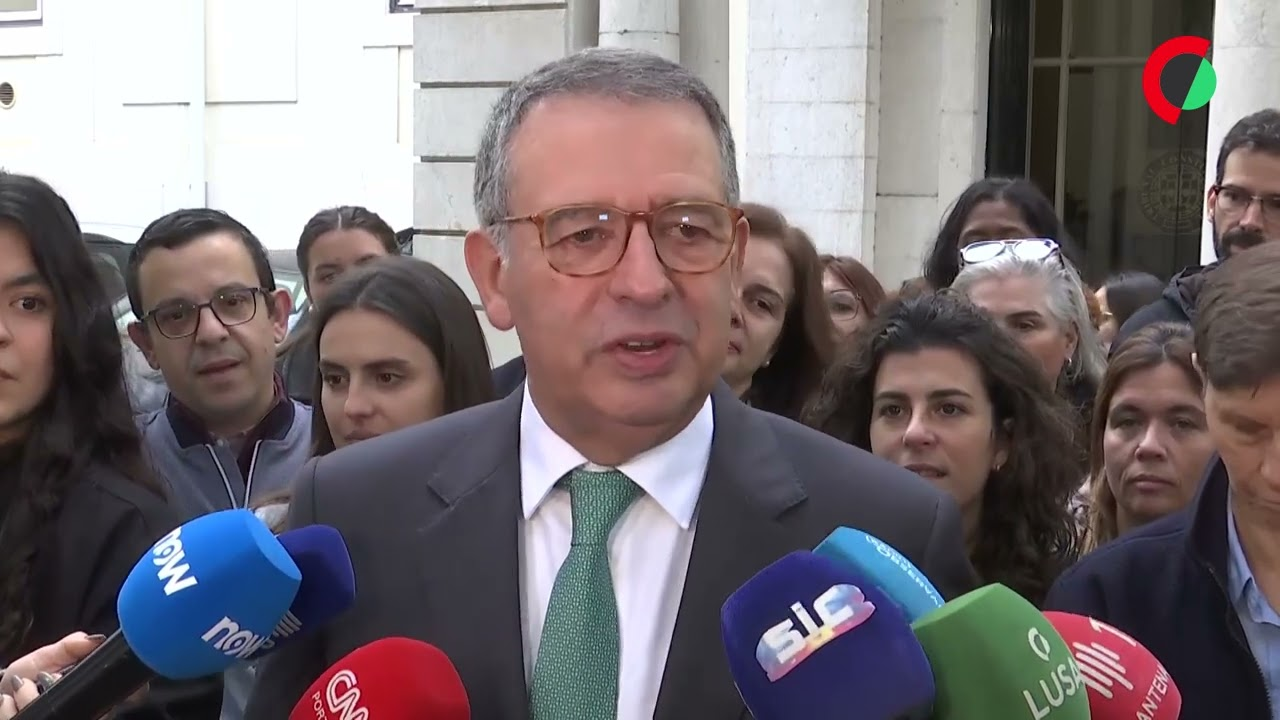
António José Seguro after formalizing his candidacy at the Constitutional Court, 17 December 2025.

By then, two main candidates emerged to represent the traditional left, the former PS leader, António José Seguro, who had been out of politics since 2014, and the former director-general of the International Organization for Migration, António Vitorino, as a group of high-profile socialists rejected the possibility of Seguro being the party's candidate, even suggesting an internal referendum to decide the party's presidential candidate, an idea that was ultimately rejected. Vitorino, who had by then failed to gain much support within the party's leadership as was expected, ended up backing away from the race following the poor results of the PS in the May 2025 legislative election, paving the way for Seguro as the clear favorite to receive the party's support in the presidential election. Despite the attempt from Seguro's opponents to draft the runner-up of the 2016 presidential election, António Sampaio da Nóvoa, and a final failed effort from Santos Silva to gain support to run, António José Seguro ended up announcing his candidacy in June 2025, receiving an almost unanimous support of the PS following the 2025 Portuguese local elections.

On the left of the PS, the absence of Sampaio da Nóvoa from the race eliminated the prospects for a united left front, prompting each party to run their own candidates, despite attempts from Seguro supporters for a single left-wing candidacy. The Communist Party announced the candidacy of former vice president of the Assembly of the Republic, António Filipe, in June 2025, with Filipe resolutely stating that he would not withdraw from the race. Catarina Martins, former leader of the Left Bloc, and incumbent MEP, entered the race in September 2025, followed in October by Jorge Pinto, a LIVRE MP from Porto. André Ventura, the leader of the radical right-wing populist Chega, and a candidate in the previous presidential election, announced his candidacy in January 2025. Following unprecedentedly strong results in the May 2025 legislative election, that made him the leader of the opposition, Ventura considered alternative candidates, such as Passos Coelho, the former CDS leader Manuel Monteiro, Major general Isidro Morais Pereira, and even considered the idea of supporting Gouveia e Melo. Nonetheless, Ventura ended up confirming his own candidacy in September 2025.

For the liberals, with Rui Rocha's re-election as leader of the Liberal Initiative, parliamentary leader Mariana Leitão was initially designated as the party's presidential candidate. However, Rocha later resigned as party leader following the 2025 legislative election, and Leitão shifted her focus to run for the liberals' leadership, withdrawing from the presidential race. In August, former leader and incumbent liberal MEP, João Cotrim de Figueiredo, announced his candidacy, becoming a major right-wing contender, precluding figures, like outgoing mayor of Porto Rui Moreira, from entering the race. Both People Animals Nature and Together for the People decided not to present or back any candidate for the first round of the election, while PAN has said they would likely support a candidate in the second round. Despite that, both Inês Sousa Real and Filipe Sousa, sole deputies from both parties, supported Seguro in the first round.

== Electoral system ==
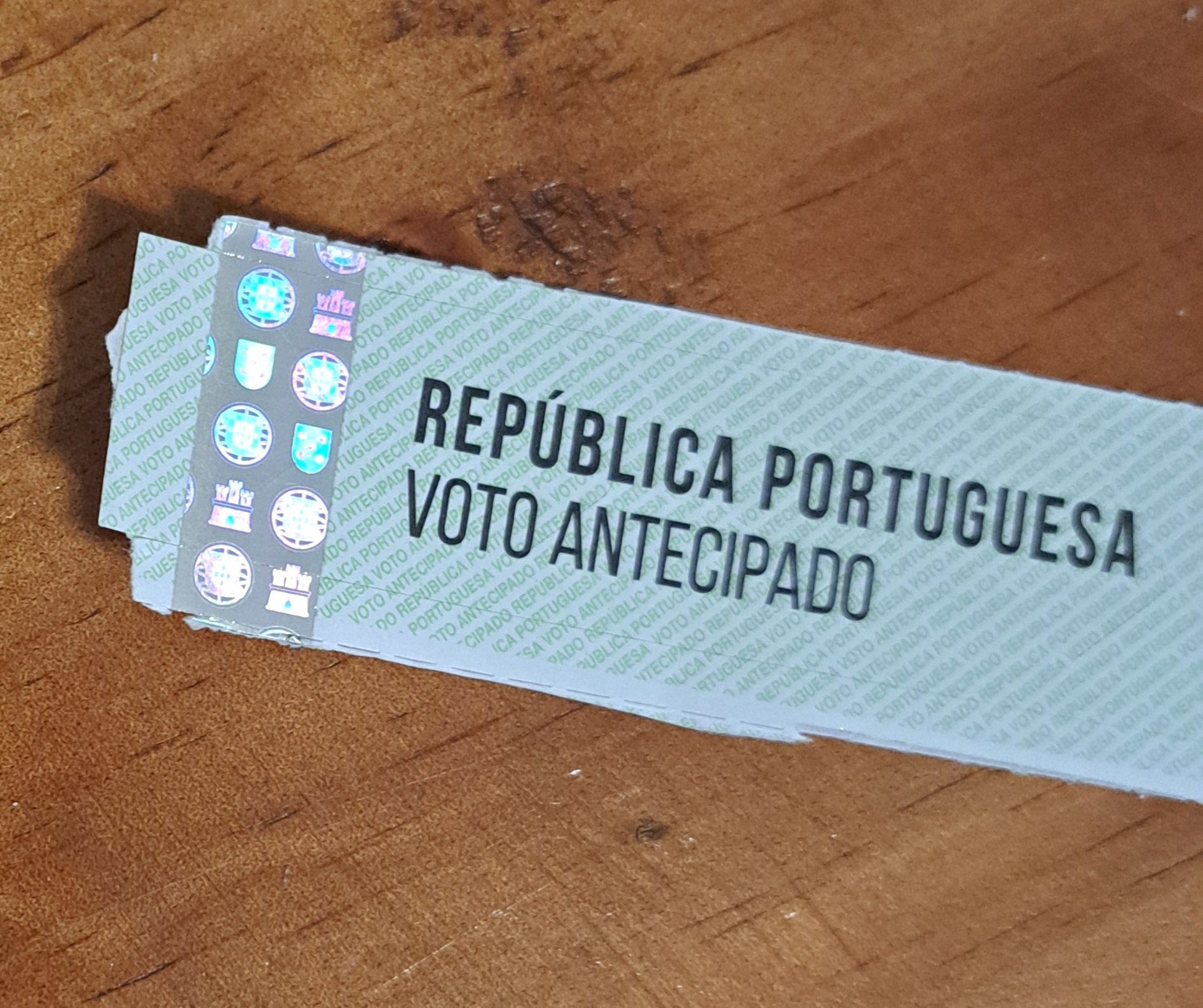
Early voting proving stamp for the 2026 presidential election.

To stand for election, candidates must be of Portuguese origin and over 35 years old, gather 7,500 signatures of support one month before the election, and submit them to the Constitutional Court of Portugal. Then, the Constitutional Court has to certify if the candidacies submitted meet the requirements to appear on the ballot. A candidate must receive a majority of votes (50% plus one vote) to be elected. If no candidate achieves a majority in the first round, a runoff election (i.e., second round, held between the two candidates who receive the most votes in the first round) has to be held. The highest number of candidacies ever accepted was ten, in 2016. Since the Carnation Revolution, there had only been a single runoff election, in the 1986 Portuguese presidential election, when Diogo Freitas do Amaral (46.3% of votes in the first round and 48.8% in the second) lost to Mário Soares (25.4% in the first round and 51.2% in the second).

=== Early voting ===
Voters were also able to vote early, with voting starting on 5 January for hospitalized and incarcerated voters and on 6 January for Portuguese citizens living abroad, ending for both groups on 8 January.. For citizens living in Portugal early voting occurred on 11 January, one week before election day, with voters having to register between 4 and 8 January to be eligible to cast an early ballot. By 8 January deadline, 218,481 voters (around 2% of the total of voters) had requested to vote early, a number lower than that recorded in 2021, during the COVID-19 pandemic. For the second round, 308,501 voters (around 3% of the total of voters) requested to cast an early ballot on 1 February, a considerably larger number than in the first round, with registration having been open between 24 and 29 January.

== Candidates ==
=== Official candidates ===
Candidates who formalized their candidacy and submitted enough signatures to the Constitutional Court that were accepted. The deadline to submit candidacies to the Court was 18 December 2025. Candidates are ordered by how they appeared on the ballot paper.

==== Advanced to runoff ====
| Candidate | Party support | Political office(s) | Details | Campaign announced | Candidacy formalized | Ref. |
|---|---|---|---|---|---|---|
| António José Seguro (63) | Socialist Party Volt Portugal | Secretary-General of the Socialist Party (2011–2014); Member of the Council of State (2011–2014); President of the Socialist Party Parliamentary Group (2004–2005); Minister in the Cabinet of the Prime Minister (2001–2002); Other offices: Member of the European Parliament (1999–2001); Secretary of State Assistant to the Prime Minister (1997–1999); Secretary of State for Youth Affairs (1995–1997); Member of Parliament for Braga (2005–2014); Member of Parliament for Lisbon (2002–2005); Member of Parliament for Guarda (1995–1999); Member of Parliament for Porto (1991–1995) | Socialist Party member; political commentator on CNN Portugal; university professor | 15 June 2025; Website | 15 December 2025; 10,000 signatures | |
| André Ventura (43) | Chega | Leader of the Opposition (since 2025); President of Chega (since 2019); Member of the Council of State (since 2024); Member of Parliament for Lisbon (since 2019) | Founder of Chega; candidate in the 2021 presidential election, finishing third with 11.9% of the votes. | 4 January 2025; Website | 15 December 2025; 14,200 signatures | |

==== Eliminated in first round ====
| Candidate | Party support | Political office(s) | Details | Campaign announced | Candidacy formalized | Ref. |
|---|---|---|---|---|---|---|
| André Pestana (49) | Socialist Alternative Movement | None | Teacher; trade unionist; former Left Bloc and Socialist Alternative Movement member | 21 December 2024; Website | 15 December 2025; 8,000 signatures | |
| Jorge Pinto (38) | LIVRE | Member of Parliament for Porto (since 2024) | LIVRE member and founder; environmental engineer; writer | 22 October 2025; Website | 17 December 2025; ~10,000 signatures | |
| Manuel João Vieira (63) | None | None | Independent; satirical politician; singer; failed candidate in the 2001, 2011 and 2016 presidential elections | 22 September 2025; Website | 3 December 2025; 12,502 signatures | |
| Catarina Martins (52) | Left Bloc | Member of the European Parliament (since 2024); Coordinator of the Left Bloc (2012–2023); Member of Parliament for Porto (2009–2023) | Left Bloc member since 2010; actress | 10 September 2025; Website | 10 December 2025; ~9,500 signatures | |
| João Cotrim de Figueiredo (64) | Liberal Initiative | Member of the European Parliament (since 2024); President of the Liberal Initiative (2019–2023); Member of Parliament for Lisbon (2019–2024) | Liberal Initiative member; businessman; former President of Turismo de Portugal (2013–2016) | 13 August 2025; Website | 3 November 2025; ~9,000 signatures | |
| Humberto Correia (64) | None | None | Independent; painter and writer; candidate for Mayor of Faro in the 2017 local election | 7 May 2021; Website | 4 December 2025; 9,490 signatures | |
| Luís Marques Mendes (68) | Social Democratic Party CDS – People's Party | Member of the Council of State (2011–2015; 2016–2026); President of the Social Democratic Party (2005–2007); Minister of Parliamentary Affairs (2002–2004); Minister in the Cabinet of the Prime Minister (1992–1995); Other offices: President of the Social Democratic Party Parliamentary Group (1995–1996); Secretary of State for the Presidency of the Council of Ministers (1987–1992); Member of Parliament for Aveiro (1999–2007); Member of Parliament for Braga (1995–1999); Deputy Mayor of Fafe (1976–1985) | Social Democratic Party member from 1974 to 2025; (Note: Suspended his party membership to run for president) political commentator on SIC | 6 February 2025; Website | 17 December 2025; 9,350 signatures | |
| António Filipe (62) | Portuguese Communist Party Ecologist Party "The Greens" | Vice President of the Assembly of the Republic (2002–2009; 2011–2015; 2019–2022); Member of Parliament for Lisbon (1987–2009; 2024–2025); Member of Parliament for Santarém (2009–2022) | Portuguese Communist Party member; jurist; university professor | 29 June 2025; Website | 4 December 2025; 12,888 signatures | |
| Henrique Gouveia e Melo (65) | People's Monarchist Party | Chief of the Naval Staff (2021–2024); COVID-19 Vaccination Plan Task Force Coordinator (2021); Commander of the European Maritime Force (2017–2019) | Independent; admiral; retired Navy officer | 29 May 2025; Website | 10 December 2025; ~10,000 signatures | |

=== Rejected ===
- Ricardo Sousa – former City Councillor in Paredes (2021–2025) (rejected for lack of enough valid signatures)
- Joana Amaral Dias – supported by the National Democratic Alternative (ADN); former MP (2003) (rejected for lack of legal documents and enough valid signatures)
- José Cardoso – supported by the Liberal Social Party (PLS); President of the PLS since 2025 (rejected for lack of enough valid signatures)

=== Unsuccessful candidates ===
- Alexandre Ramos
- Ângela Maryah – life coach
- Aristides Teixeira – perennial candidate; leader of the 1994 25 April Bridge riots against increased tolls; failed candidate in the 1996 and 2011 presidential elections
- Bruno Gomes
- Bruno Monteiro
- Bruno Teixeira
- David Belo
- Eduardo Lourenço
- Emanuel Moleirinho
- Emílio Ramos
- Filipa Galante
- Jaime "Jaimão" Silva – humorist; singer
- Júlio Cabral
- Lino da Silva
- Luís Andrade
- Luís da Silva Lourenço
- Luís Maximiano
- Manuela Magno – supported by Volt Portugal; physics professor at University of Évora; failed candidate in the 2006 election
- Manuel Santos
- Marco de Carvalho
- Miguel dos Santos
- Nelson Rodrigues
- Orlando Cruz – perennial candidate; retired taxi driver; former CDS–PP member; failed candidate in the 2006, 2011, 2016 and 2021 elections
- Patrícia Esteves
- Paulo Rodrigues
- Pedro Aparício
- Raul Perestrello – businessman; jeweler
- Ricardo Loura
- Rita Rodrigues
- Sara Castanheira
- Vítor Pereira
- Vítor Ribeiro
- Vitor Rodrigues

=== Withdrew candidacy ===
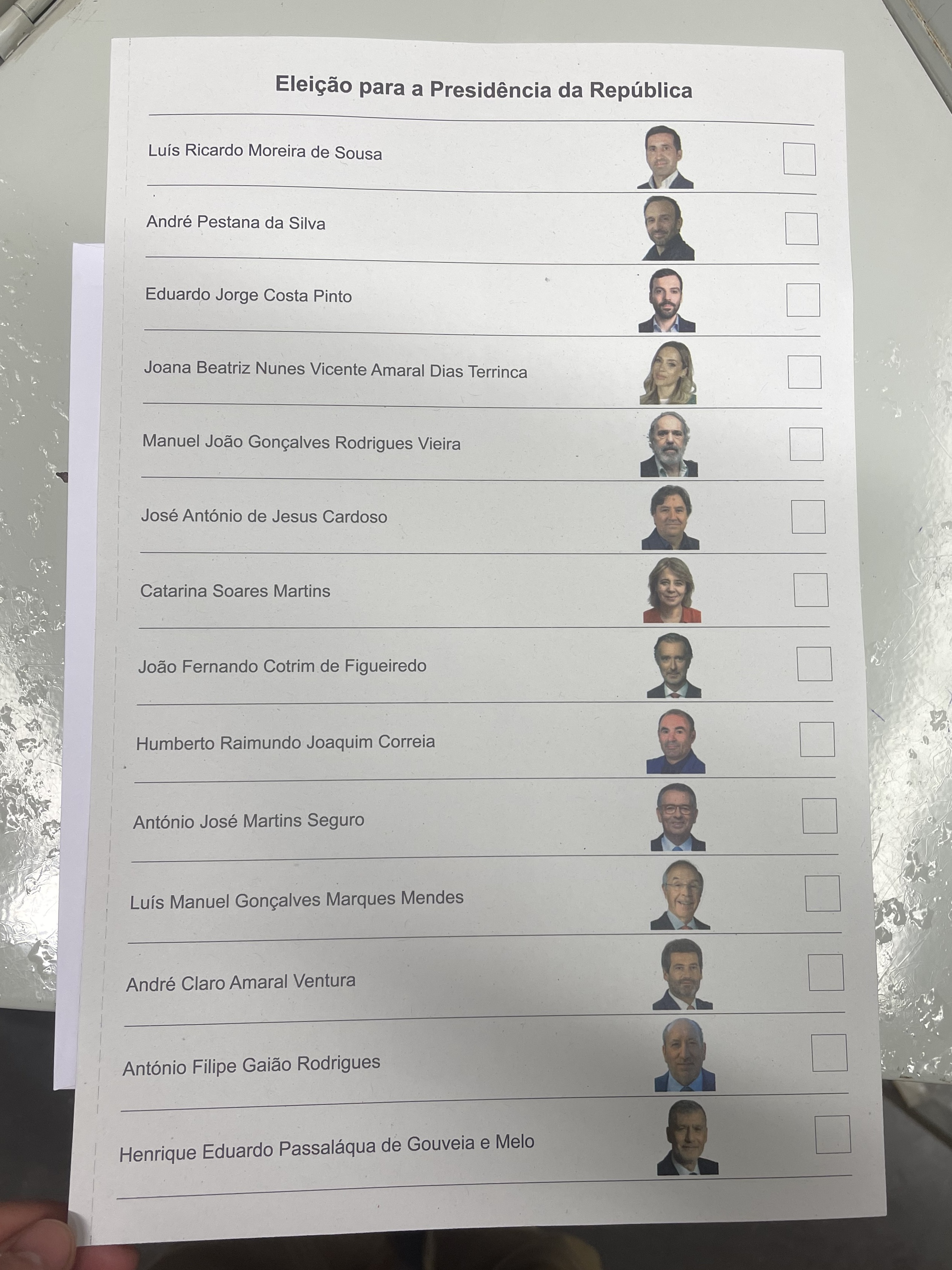
Ballot paper for the first round 2026 Portuguese presidential election. It includes Ricardo Sousa, Joana Amaral Dias and José Cardoso, candidates rejected due to insufficient signatures.

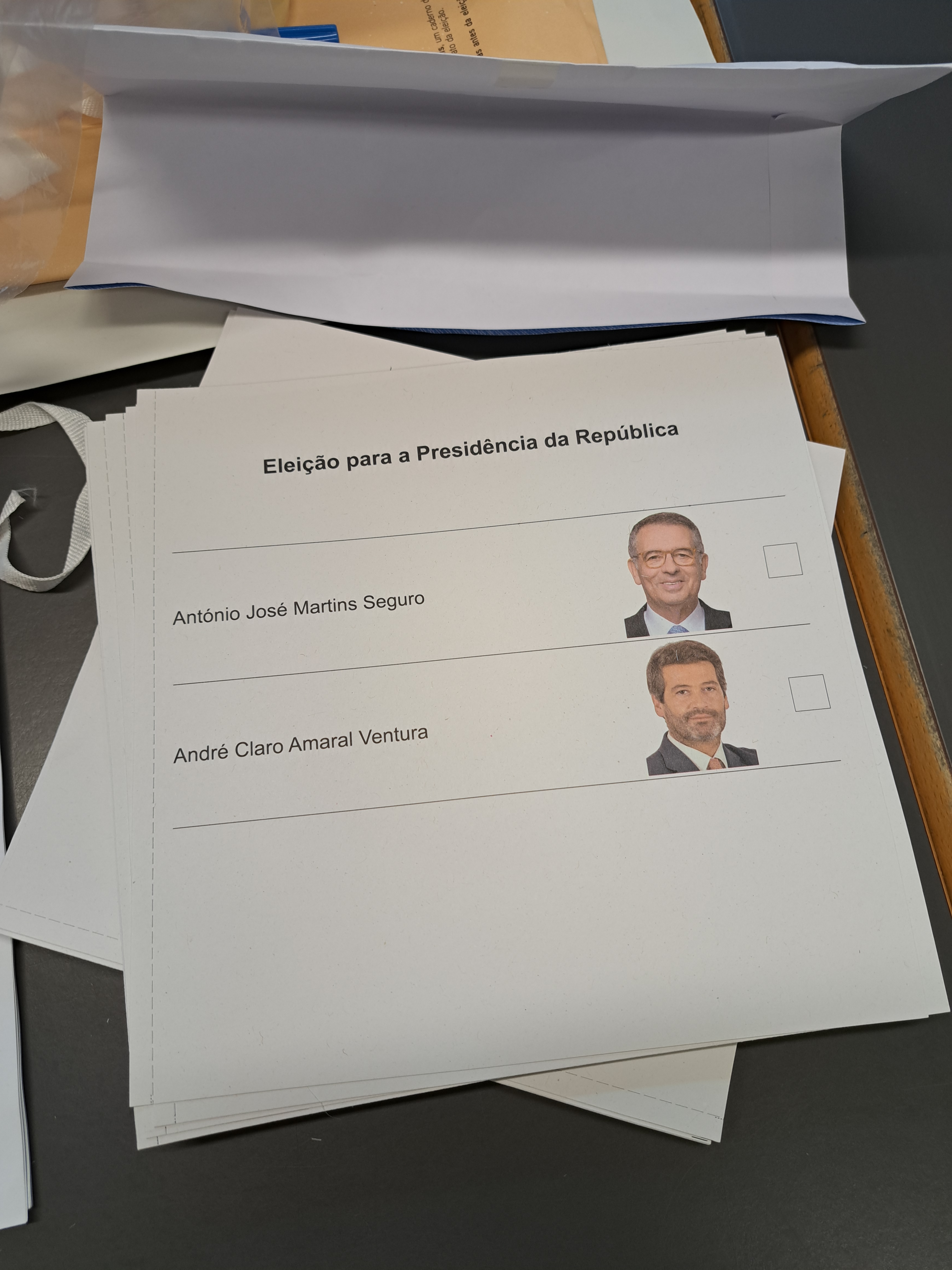
Ballot paper for the second round of 2026 Portuguese presidential election.

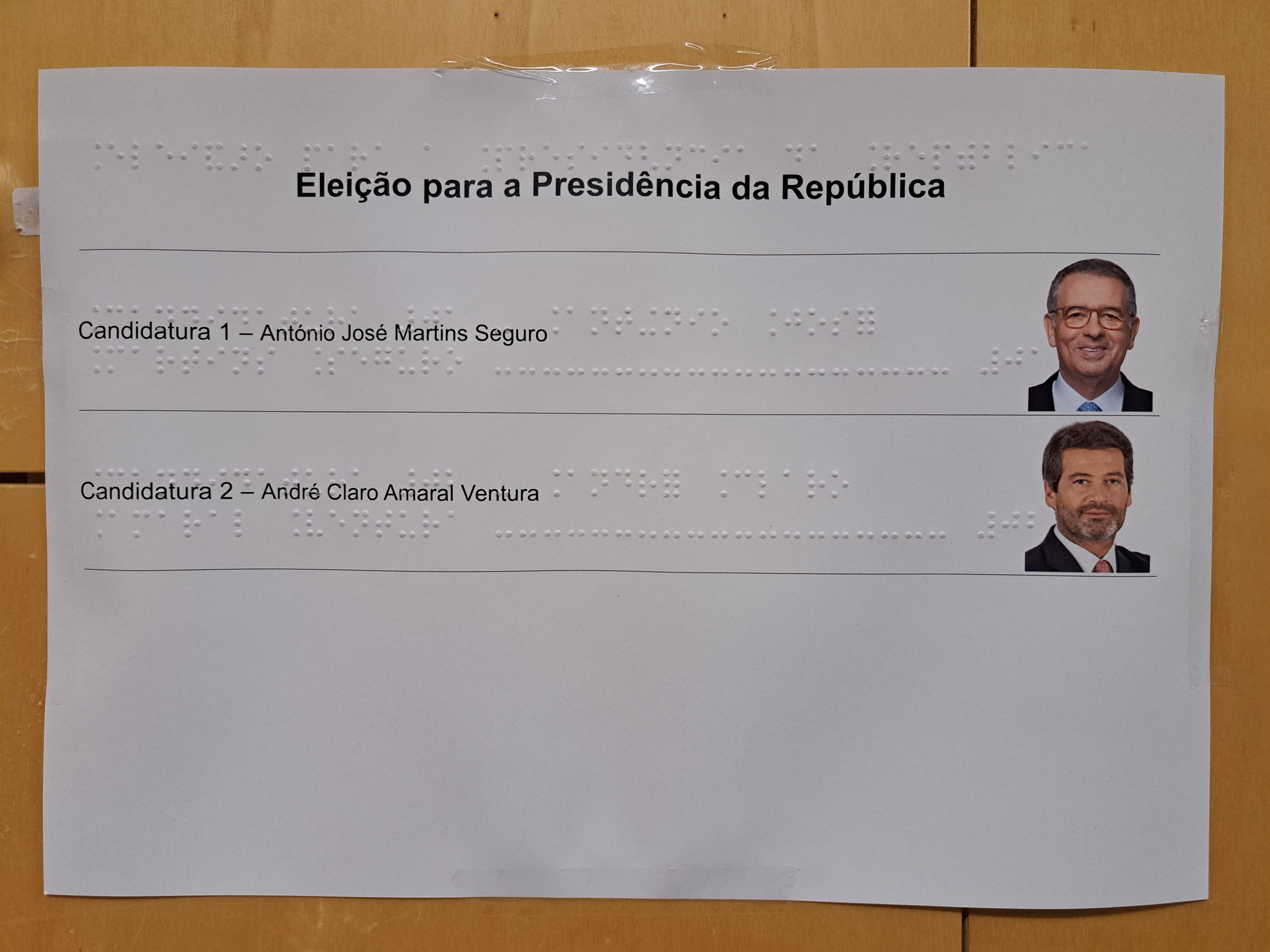
Braille matrix paper for the second round of 2026 Portuguese presidential election.

- Mariana Leitão – incumbent President of the Liberal Initiative (since 2025); incumbent MP (since 2024) (endorsed Cotrim)
- Tim Vieira – businessman; investor on the TV show Shark Tank on SIC; founder of Brave Generation Academy
- Pedro Tinoco de Faria – retired Lieutenant colonel; businessman; writer; (endorsed Ventura and became his campaign chair)
- Vitorino Silva – former President of React, Include, Recycle (2019–2022); former President of the Parish Council of Rans (1994–2002); candidate in the 2016 and 2021 presidential elections (endorsed Seguro)

=== Declined ===
- Ana Gomes – former MEP (2014–2019); finished in second place in the previous presidential election (endorsed António José Seguro)
- António Costa – incumbent president of the European Council since 2024; former prime minister (2015–2024); former secretary-general of the Socialist Party (PS) (2014–2024); minister in the 13th, 14th and 17th governments; former MP (1991–2005; 2015–2024)
- António Guterres – incumbent Secretary-General of the United Nations since 2017; former prime minister (1995–2002); former secretary-general of the Socialist Party (PS) (1992–2002); former MP (1976–2002)
- António Sampaio da Nóvoa – former member of the Council of State (2022–2024); former Permanent Delegate to UNESCO (2018–2021); former rector of the University of Lisbon (2006–2013); finished in second place in the 2016 presidential election
- António Vitorino – former director-general of the International Organization for Migration (2018–2023); former European Commissioner for Justice and Home Affairs (1999–2004); former minister of the presidency and of defence (1995–1997); former judge of the Constitutional Court (1989–1994); former MP (1980–1989, 1995–1999, 2005–2009)
- Augusto Santos Silva – former president of the Assembly of the Republic (2022–2024); minister in the 14th, 17th, 18th, 21st, 22nd governments; former MP (1995–2024) (endorsed António José Seguro)
- Carlos César – incumbent member of the Council of State since 2016; incumbent President of the Socialist Party since 2014; former president of the Regional Government of the Azores (1996–2012); former MP (1987–1991; 2015–2019) (endorsed António José Seguro)
- Carlos Moedas – incumbent mayor of Lisbon since 2021; member of the Council of State since 2024; former European Commissioner for Research, Science and Innovation (2014–2019); former MP (2011–2014) (endorsed Luís Marques Mendes)
- Cristina Ferreira – television presenter; businesswoman; celebrity
- Elisa Ferreira – former European Commissioner for Cohesion and Reforms (2019–2024); minister in the 13th and 14th governments; former MEP (2004–2016); former MP (2002–2004)
- Fernando Medina – former minister of finance (2022–2024); former mayor of Lisbon (2015–2021) (endorsed António José Seguro)
- Francisco Assis – MEP since 2024 (and previously in 2004–2009 and 2014–2019); former MP (1995–2004; 2009–2014; 2024); former mayor of Amarante (1989–1995) (endorsed António José Seguro)
- Isidro Morais Pereira – Major general; retired Army officer; political commentator
- João Ferreira – former MEP (2009–2021); presidential candidate in the previous election (endorsed António Filipe)
- José Luís Carneiro – incumbent Secretary-general of the Socialist Party (since 2025); incumbent MP since 2024 (also in 2005); former minister of internal administration (2022–2024); former mayor of Baião (2005–2015) (endorsed António José Seguro)
- José Manuel Durão Barroso – former president of the European Commission (2004–2014); former prime minister (2002–2004); former president of the Social Democratic Party (PSD) (1998–2004); former minister of foreign affairs (1992–1995); former MP (1985–2004) (endorsed Luís Marques Mendes)
- José Pedro Aguiar-Branco – incumbent president of the Assembly of the Republic since 2024; incumbent MP since 2024 (also in 2005–2019); minister in the 16th, 19th and 20th governments
- Leonor Beleza – incumbent member of the Council of State since 2008; former minister of health (1985–1990); former MP (1983–1985; 1987–1995; 2002–2005) (endorsed Luís Marques Mendes)
- Luís Filipe Menezes – incumbent mayor of Vila Nova de Gaia since 2025 (also 1997–2013); former president of the Social Democratic Party (PSD) (2007–2008) (endorsed Luís Marques Mendes)
- Mário Centeno – incumbent governor of the Bank of Portugal since 2020; former president of the Eurogroup (2018–2020); former minister of finance (2015–2020)
- Marisa Matias – former MP (2024–2025); former MEP (2009–2024); presidential candidate in the 2016 and 2021 presidential elections (endorsed Catarina Martins)
- Paulo Portas – former leader of CDS – People's Party (CDS–PP) (1998–2005, 2007–2016); former deputy prime minister (2013–2015); minister in the 15th, 16th, 19th and 20th governments; former MP (1995–2016)
- Paulo Raimundo – incumbent secretary-general of the Portuguese Communist Party (PCP) since 2022; incumbent MP since 2024 (endorsed António Filipe)
- Pedro Passos Coelho – former prime minister (2011–2015); former president of the Social Democratic Party (PSD) (2010–2018); former MP (1991–1999; 2011–2018)
- Pedro Santana Lopes – incumbent mayor of Figueira da Foz since 2021 (also in 1998–2002); former prime minister (2004–2005); former mayor of Lisbon (2002–2004; 2005); former president of the Social Democratic Party (PSD) (2004–2005); former secretary of state of the presidency (1985–1987) and of culture (1990–1994); former MP (1980–1995, 2001–2002, 2005–2009); former MEP (1985–1987)
- Rodrigo Saraiva – incumbent Vice President of the Assembly of the Republic since 2024; incumbent MP since 2022; former leader of the IL parliamentary caucus (2022–2024) (endorsed João Cotrim de Figueiredo)
- Rui Moreira – former Mayor of Porto (2013–2025) (endorsed Luís Marques Mendes)
- Rui Rio – former president of the Social Democratic Party (PSD) (2018–2022); former mayor of Porto (2002–2013); former MP (1991–2002; 2019–2022) (endorsed Henrique Gouveia e Melo)
- Rui Rocha – former leader of the Liberal Initiative (IL) (2023–2025); incumbent MP since 2022 (endorsed João Cotrim de Figueiredo)
- Rui Tavares – incumbent MP since 2022; former MEP (2009–2014) (endorsed Jorge Pinto)
- Tiago Mayan – former president of the Parish of Aldoar, Foz do Douro e Nevogilde (2021–2024); presidential candidate in the previous election

== Campaign ==
=== Issues ===
The first round campaign was marked by issues like the state of healthcare in Portugal; immigration; the proposed changes to labour laws; the use of presidential powers, such as the use of the power to dissolve parliament; constitutional reform; foreign policy, being highlighted the war in Ukraine, the presence of Portugal in NATO, the involvement of Donald Trump in European affairs and the situation in Venezuela; plus the importance of political stability to the country. During the one-on-one debates, the issue of transparency also arose, with PSD supported candidate, Luís Marques Mendes, being strongly questioned about his business past and links to corporations and the government.

On 23 December 2025, a court in Lisbon ordered Chega presidential candidate André Ventura to remove campaign posters targeting the Romani people within 24 hours, ruling that the materials are discriminatory and may incite hatred, or face daily fines of €2,500 (US$2,940) per poster. Also, the last few days of the first round campaign were dominated by an accusation of sexual harassment against João Cotrim de Figueiredo by a former female IL parliamentary aid, with the candidate denying the accusation and even filing a lawsuit against the woman who accused him, despite new revelations and contradictions being reported.

The campaign for the second round was limited, as bad weather across the country, and the devastating impact of Storm Kristin, after 28 January, all but put a halt to the campaign, despite the discussion about the "wave" of center-right endorsements for Seguro and the government's response to the storm aftermath being dominant.

=== Candidates' slogans ===
| Candidate | Original slogan | English translation | Ref. |
|---|---|---|---|
| António José Seguro | « Futuro Seguro » | "Safe Future" | |
| André Ventura | « Os Portugueses Primeiro » | "The Portuguese First" | |
| João Cotrim de Figueiredo | « Imagina Portugal »; « Um Presidente com o perfil certo » | "Imagine Portugal"; "A President with the right profile" | |
| Henrique Gouveia e Melo | « O meu partido é Portugal » | "My party is Portugal" | |
| Luís Marques Mendes | « O valor da experiência » | "The value of experience" | |
| Catarina Martins | « Contigo » | "With you" | |
| António Filipe | « Com o Povo, por Abril, por Portugal » | "With the People, for April, for Portugal" | |
| Manuel João Vieira | « Só desisto se for eleito » | "I'll only give up if I'm elected" | |
| Jorge Pinto | « Presidente Presente » | "Present President" | |
| André Pestana | « É hora de abrir a pestana » | "It's time to open your eyes" | |
| Humberto Correia | « Agir para construir Portugal » | "Acting to build Portugal" | |

=== Candidates' debates ===
==== First round ====
The three main TV channels in Portugal, RTP1, SIC and TVI, agreed to host 28 one-on-one debates between the 8 main candidates on the ballot for the first round. However, this format was challenged, as the three main broadcasters were accused of forcing an exclusivity agreement so that the debates only take place on these three channels. CMTV filed a complaint to the Electoral Commission (CNE) against RTP, SIC and TVI, accusing the networks of an "anti-competitive matrix". The channels denied such agreement, but the media regulator ruled in favour of CMTV and advised for the debate format to include the plaintiff. Despite this advise, the 3 channels decided to not change the format. Radio stations also hosted a debate with the 8 main candidates, while RTP1 hosted a debate with all 11 candidates on the ballot.

2026 Portuguese presidential election debates
| Date | Time | Organisers | Moderator(s) | P Present (Note: Denotes a main invitee attending the event.) S Surrogate (Note: Denotes a main invitee not attending the event, sending a surrogate in their place.) NI Not invited I Invited A Absent invitee | | | | | | | | | | | | |
| Date | Time | Organisers | Moderator(s) | Gouveia e Melo | Marques Mendes | António José Seguro | André Ventura | Cotrim Figueiredo | Catarina Martins | António Filipe | Jorge Pinto | Manuel João Vieira | Humberto Correia | André Pestana | Viewers (Average audience) | Ref. |
| Date | Time | Organisers | Moderator(s) | Ind. | PSD | PS | CH | IL | BE | CDU | L | Ind. | Ind. | Ind. | Viewers (Average audience) | Ref. |
|---|---|---|---|---|---|---|---|---|---|---|---|---|---|---|---|---|
| 17 November 2025 | 21:00 | TVI | José Alberto Carvalho | NI | NI | P | P | NI | NI | NI | NI | NI | NI | NI | 1,052,872 | |
| 18 November 2025 | 21:00 | SIC | Clara de Sousa | NI | P | NI | NI | NI | NI | P | NI | NI | NI | NI | 877,643 | |
| 20 November 2025 | 21:00 | RTP1 | Vítor Gonçalves | P | NI | NI | NI | P | NI | NI | NI | NI | NI | NI | 659,884 | |
| 23 November 2025 | 21:00 | SIC | Clara de Sousa | P | NI | NI | NI | NI | P | NI | NI | NI | NI | NI | 947,219 | |
| 24 November 2025 | 21:00 | RTP1 | Vítor Gonçalves | NI | NI | NI | NI | P | NI | NI | P | NI | NI | NI | 483,287 | |
| 25 November 2025 | 21:00 | SIC | Clara de Sousa | NI | P | NI | P | NI | NI | NI | NI | NI | NI | NI | 1,242,261 | |
| 26 November 2025 | 21:00 | TVI | José Alberto Carvalho | P | NI | NI | NI | NI | NI | NI | P | NI | NI | NI | 737,593 | |
| 28 November 2025 | 21:00 | TVI | José Alberto Carvalho | NI | NI | NI | P | NI | P | NI | NI | NI | NI | NI | 1,006,094 | |
| 29 November 2025 | 21:00 | RTP1 | Vítor Gonçalves | NI | P | NI | NI | NI | NI | NI | P | NI | NI | NI | 479,279 | |
| 30 November 2025 | 21:00 | SIC | Clara de Sousa | NI | NI | NI | NI | P | NI | P | NI | NI | NI | NI | 684,048 | |
| 1 December 2025 | 21:00 | RTP1 | Carlos Daniel | NI | NI | P | NI | NI | NI | NI | P | NI | NI | NI | 502,827 | |
| 2 December 2025 | 21:00 | TVI | José Alberto Carvalho | P | NI | NI | NI | NI | NI | P | NI | NI | NI | NI | 798,149 | |
| 3 December 2025 | 21:00 | RTP1 | Carlos Daniel | NI | P | P | NI | NI | NI | NI | NI | NI | NI | NI | 618,265 | |
| 4 December 2025 | 21:00 | TVI | José Alberto Carvalho | NI | NI | NI | NI | P | P | NI | NI | NI | NI | NI | 877,863 | |
| 6 December 2025 | 21:00 | SIC | Clara de Sousa | NI | NI | P | NI | NI | P | NI | NI | NI | NI | NI | 843,242 | |
| 7 December 2025 | 21:00 | TVI | José Alberto Carvalho | NI | P | NI | NI | P | NI | NI | NI | NI | NI | NI | 781,404 | |
| 8 December 2025 | 21:00 | RTP1 | Carlos Daniel | NI | NI | NI | NI | NI | NI | P | P | NI | NI | NI | 489,918 | |
| 9 December 2025 | 21:00 | SIC | Clara de Sousa | P | NI | P | NI | NI | NI | NI | NI | NI | NI | NI | 937,825 | |
| 10 December 2025 | 21:00 | RTP1 | Carlos Daniel | NI | NI | NI | NI | NI | P | P | NI | NI | NI | NI | 403,857 | |
| 11 December 2025 | 21:00 | SIC | Clara de Sousa | NI | NI | NI | P | NI | NI | NI | P | NI | NI | NI | 876,486 | |
| 12 December 2025 | 21:00 | RTP1 | Carlos Daniel | NI | P | NI | NI | NI | P | NI | NI | NI | NI | NI | 601,245 | |
| 13 December 2025 | 21:00 | RTP1 | Vítor Gonçalves | NI | NI | NI | P | NI | NI | P | NI | NI | NI | NI | 616,336 | |
| 15 December 2025 | 21:00 | RTP1 | Carlos Daniel | P | NI | NI | P | NI | NI | NI | NI | NI | NI | NI | 952,009 | |
| 16 December 2025 | 21:00 | RTP1 | Vítor Gonçalves | NI | NI | P | NI | P | NI | NI | NI | NI | NI | NI | 737,159 | |
| 19 December 2025 | 21:00 | SIC | Clara de Sousa | NI | NI | NI | P | P | NI | NI | NI | NI | NI | NI | 916,011 | |
| 20 December 2025 | 21:00 | TVI | José Alberto Carvalho | NI | NI | P | NI | NI | NI | P | NI | NI | NI | NI | 566,655 | |
| 21 December 2025 | 21:00 | RTP1 | Vítor Gonçalves | NI | NI | NI | NI | NI | P | NI | P | NI | NI | NI | 407,255 | |
| 22 December 2025 | 21:00 | TVI | José Alberto Carvalho | P | P | NI | NI | NI | NI | NI | NI | NI | NI | NI | 800,224 | |
| 2 January 2026 | 9:30 | Antena 1 TSF; Renascença; Observador | Natália Carvalho; Susana Madureira Martins; Judith Menezes e Sousa; Rui Pedro Nunes | P | P | P | P | P | P | P | P | NI | NI | NI | —N/a | |
| 5 January 2026 | 10:00 | Antena 1 | Natália Carvalho | NI | NI | NI | NI | NI | NI | NI | NI | P | P | P | —N/a | |
| 6 January 2026 | 22:00 | RTP1 | Carlos Daniel | P | P | P | P | P | P | P | P | P | P | P | 405,000 | |
Candidate viewed as "most convincing" in each debate or debates
| Date | Time | Organisers | Polling firm | | | | | | | | | | | | | |
| Date | Time | Organisers | Polling firm | Ind. | PSD | PS | CH | IL | BE | CDU | L | Ind. | Ind. | Ind. | Notes | |
| Debates 17 Nov – 3 Dec 2025 | | | Aximage | 11 | 22 | 11 | 22 | 15 | 6 | 3 | 4 | —N/a | —N/a | —N/a | (Note: Undecided: 7%.) | |
| Debates 17 Nov 2025 – 5 Jan 2026 | | | Aximage | 9 | 16 | 14 | 29 | 15 | 4 | 2 | 4 | —N/a | —N/a | —N/a | (Note: Undecided: 8%.) | |

==== Second round ====
The three main TV channels, RTP1, SIC and TVI, agreed to invite the two candidates in the second round for a debate, with both Seguro and Ventura accepting the invitation. The debate was held on 27 January and broadcast simultaneously by the three major networks. Radio stations also invited the two candidates for a one-on-one debate, but the Seguro campaign rejected this invitation and a debate was not held.

2026 Portuguese presidential election debates
| Date | Time | Organisers | Moderator(s) | P Present (Note: Denotes a main invitee attending the event.) I Invited | | | |
| Date | Time | Organisers | Moderator(s) | António José Seguro | André Ventura | Viewers (Average audience) | Ref. |
| Date | Time | Organisers | Moderator(s) | PS | CH | Viewers (Average audience) | Ref. |
|---|---|---|---|---|---|---|---|
| 27 January 2026 | 20:30 | RTP1; SIC; TVI | Carlos Daniel; Clara de Sousa; Sara Pinto | P | P | 3,072,401 | |
Candidate viewed as "most convincing" in the debate
| Date | Time | Organisers | Polling firm | | | | |
| Date | Time | Organisers | Polling firm | PS | CH | Notes | |
| 27 January 2026 | 20:30 | RTP1, SIC, TVI | Pitagórica | 41 | 16 | (Note: Tie: 7%; Neither: 4%; Didn't watch: 29%; Undecided: 3%.) | |
| 27 January 2026 | 20:30 | RTP1, SIC, TVI | Aximage | 57 | 34 | (Note: Doesn't know: 9%.) | |

== Endorsements ==
Endorsements from first-round candidates
| First-round candidate | First round | Endorsement | Ref. |
|---|---|---|---|
| João Cotrim de Figueiredo | 16.00% | Against Ventura (Note: Cotrim de Figueiredo refused to endorse either candidate, although he made clear that he would not vote for Ventura and would not spoil his ballot.) | |
| Henrique Gouveia e Melo | 12.32% | António José Seguro | |
| Luís Marques Mendes | 11.30% | António José Seguro | |
| Catarina Martins | 2.06% | António José Seguro | |
| António Filipe | 1.64% | António José Seguro | |
| Manuel João Vieira | 1.08% | No endorsement | |
| Jorge Pinto | 0.68% | António José Seguro | |
| André Pestana | 0.19% | António José Seguro | |
| Humberto Correia | 0.08% | No endorsement | |

Party endorsements in the second round
| Candidate | Parties | Ref. |
|---|---|---|
| António José Seguro | PS | |
| António José Seguro | Volt | |
| António José Seguro | L | |
| António José Seguro | PCP | |
| António José Seguro | PEV | |
| António José Seguro | BE | |
| António José Seguro | PAN | |
| André Ventura | CH | |
| André Ventura | ADN | |
| No endorsement | PSD (Note: While the official party's or presidential candidate's position was not to endorse either presidential candidate in the second round, certain individuals within the party publicly announced their support for Seguro and their intention to vote for him in the second round.) | |
| No endorsement | IL | |
| No endorsement | CDS–PP | |
| No endorsement | JPP (Note: While JPP has previously voted not to endorse any candidate in the first and second rounds, the party's only member of the Assembly of the Republic Filipe Sousa endorsed Seguro.) | |
| No endorsement | PCTP/MRPP | |

== Opinion polling ==
=== First round ===
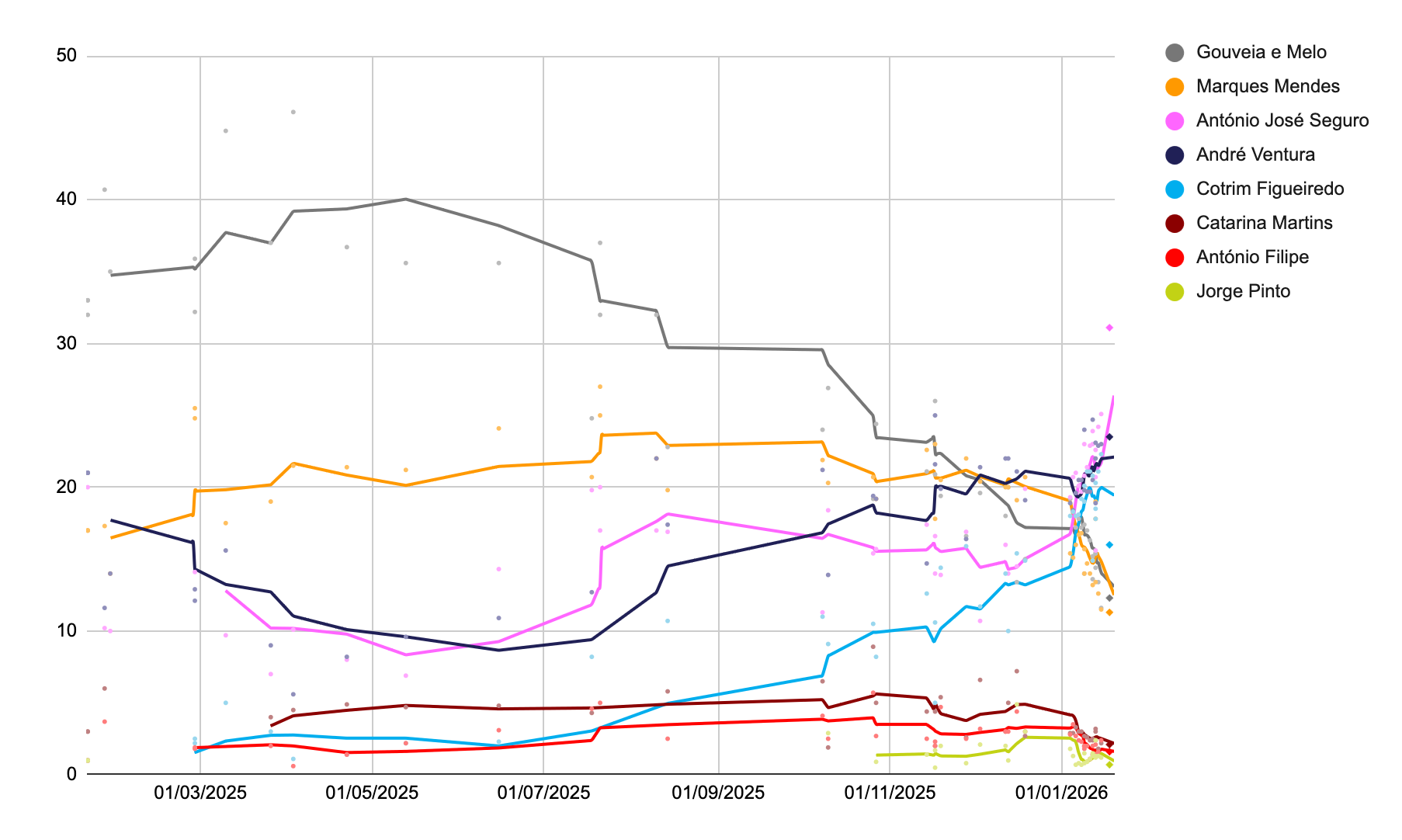
Graph of the polling for the 2026 Portuguese presidential election.

==== Polling aggregations ====
| Polling aggregator | Last update | Marques Mendes | António José Seguro | André Ventura | António Filipe | Catarina Martins | Cotrim Figueiredo | Gouveia e Melo | Jorge Pinto | Lead |
| Polling aggregator | Last update | PSD | PS | CH | CDU | BE | IL | Ind | L | Lead |
|---|---|---|---|---|---|---|---|---|---|---|
| First round results | 18 January 2026 | 11.3 | 31.1 | 23.5 | 1.6 | 2.1 | 16.0 | 12.3 | 0.7 | 7.6 |
| Observador | 16 January 2026 | 12.9 | 22.8 | 22.9 | 2.4 | 2.3 | 20.1 | 12.7 | 1.2 | 0.1 |
| Renascença | 16 January 2026 | 14.8 | 20.8 | 21.7 | 1.7 | 2.2 | 17.9 | 14.5 | 1.3 | 0.9 |
| Público | 13 January 2026 | 16.1 | 20.2 | 21.7 | 2.2 | 3.0 | 18.6 | 15.2 | 1.5 | 1.5 |

=== Second round ===
==== Polling aggregations ====
| Polling aggregator | Last update | António José Seguro | André Ventura | Lead |
| Polling aggregator | Last update | PS | CH | Lead |
|---|---|---|---|---|
| Second round results | 8 February 2026 | 66.8 | 33.2 | 33.6 |
| Observador | 6 February 2026 | 67.4 | 32.6 | 34.8 |
| Renascença | 3 February 2026 | 68.3 | 31.7 | 36.6 |
| Público | 2 February 2026 | 65.6 | 34.4 | 31.2 |

== Campaign budgets ==
| Candidate (Party) | Election result | State subsidy | | Political parties contributions | Fundraising | Total revenue | | Expenses | Debt |
| Candidate (Party) | Election result | Calculated | Budgeted | Political parties contributions | Fundraising | Calculated | Budgeted | Expenses | Debt |
|---|---|---|---|---|---|---|---|---|---|
| António José Seguro (PS, Volt) | 31.1% | €1,026,482 | €1,092,720 | €0 | €170,000 | €1,223,200 | €1,487,720 | €1,130,000 | €0 |
| André Ventura (CH) | 23.5% | €1,029,613 | €400,000 | €300,000 | €150,000 | €3,728,532 | €900,000 | €900,000 | €0 |
| João Cotrim de Figueiredo (IL) | 16.0% | €721,663 | €350,000 | €0 | €150,000 | €871,872 | €500,000 | €500,000 | €0 |
| Henrique Gouveia e Melo (PPM) | 12.3% | €621,344 | €700,000 | €0 | €305,000 | €994,694 | €1,025,000 | €1,025,000 | €30,306 |
| Luís Marques Mendes (PSD, CDS–PP) | 11.3% | €583,898 | €1,000,000 | €0 | €320,000 | €876,570 | €1,320,000 | €1,320,000 | €379,887 |
| Catarina Martins (BE) | 2.1% | €0 | €47,450 | €0 | €3,000 | €89,048 | €50,450 | €50,450 | €0 |
| António Filipe (PCP, PEV) | 1.6% | €0 | €300,000 | €80,000 | €15,000 | €329,299 | €395,000 | €395,000 | €65,701 |
| Manuel João Vieira (Ind.) | 1.1% | €0 | €0 | €0 | €860 | —N/a | €860 | €860 | —N/a |
| Jorge Pinto (L) | 0.7% | €0 | €87,000 | €0 | €10,000 | €82,013 | €97,000 | €97,000 | €14,987 |
| André Pestana (MAS) | 0.2% | €0 | €0 | €0 | €6,200 | €5,948 | €6,200 | €6,200 | €252 |
| Humberto Correia (Ind.) | 0.1% | €0 | —N/a | —N/a | —N/a | —N/a | —N/a | —N/a | —N/a |
Source: Portuguese Constitutional Court (TC)

== Voter turnout ==
The table below shows voter turnout throughout election day including voters from Overseas.

=== First round ===
| Turnout | Time | | | | | | | | |
| Turnout | 12:00 | | | 16:00 | | | 19:00 | | |
| Turnout | 2021 | 2026 | ± | 2021 | 2026 | ± | 2021 | 2026 | ± |
|---|---|---|---|---|---|---|---|---|---|
| Total | 17.07% | 21.18% | ▲ +4.11 pp | 35.44% | 45.51% | ▲ +10.07 pp | 39.26% | 52.39% | ▲ +13.13 pp |

Voter turnout was higher in the first round compared to 2021, with 5,77 million voters casting a ballot, the second highest number of votes cast in a first round presidential election in Portuguese history, only surpassed by the 1980 turnout, and the third highest turnout in a national election in 30 years, only behind the 2024 and 2025 legislative elections. In Portugal alone, the turnout rate stood at 61.50 percent, an increase of 16.05 percent compared with 2021, while in Overseas constituencies, Europe and Outside of Europe, the turnout rate also increased to 4.09%, compared with the 1.88% from 2021. The overall share of voter turnout, Portugal alone and Overseas combined, stood at 52.39%, a 13.13 percent increase compared with 2021.

=== Second round ===
| Turnout | Time | | | | | | | | |
| Turnout | 12:00 | | | 16:00 | | | 19:00 | | |
| Turnout | 1st | 2nd | ± | 1st | 2nd | ± | 1st | 2nd | ± |
|---|---|---|---|---|---|---|---|---|---|
| Total | 21.18% | 22.35% | ▲ +1.17 pp | 45.51% | 45.50% | ▼ −0.01 pp | 52.39% | 50.03% | ▼ −2.36 pp |

Due to Storm Kristin and its resulting floods, some localities postponed the second round voting to 15 February: the municipalities of Alcácer do Sal, Arruda dos Vinhos, Golegã, and parts of the municipalities of Cartaxo (parish of Valada), Leiria (parish of Bidoeira de Cima), Rio Maior (parish of Alcobertas and part of parish of Rio Maior), Salvaterra de Magos (parish of Salvaterra de Magos), and Santarém (parts of the city of Santarém and of the parish of São Vicente do Paul). These localities comprised 36,852 registered voters. Despite fears of low turnout, it was only slightly lower than in the first round, with 5,52 million voters casting a ballot, an overall voter turnout share of 50 percent. In Portugal alone, the turnout rate dropped to 58.67 percent, while on the other hand, Overseas constituencies saw a turnout increase to 4.83 percent.

== Results ==
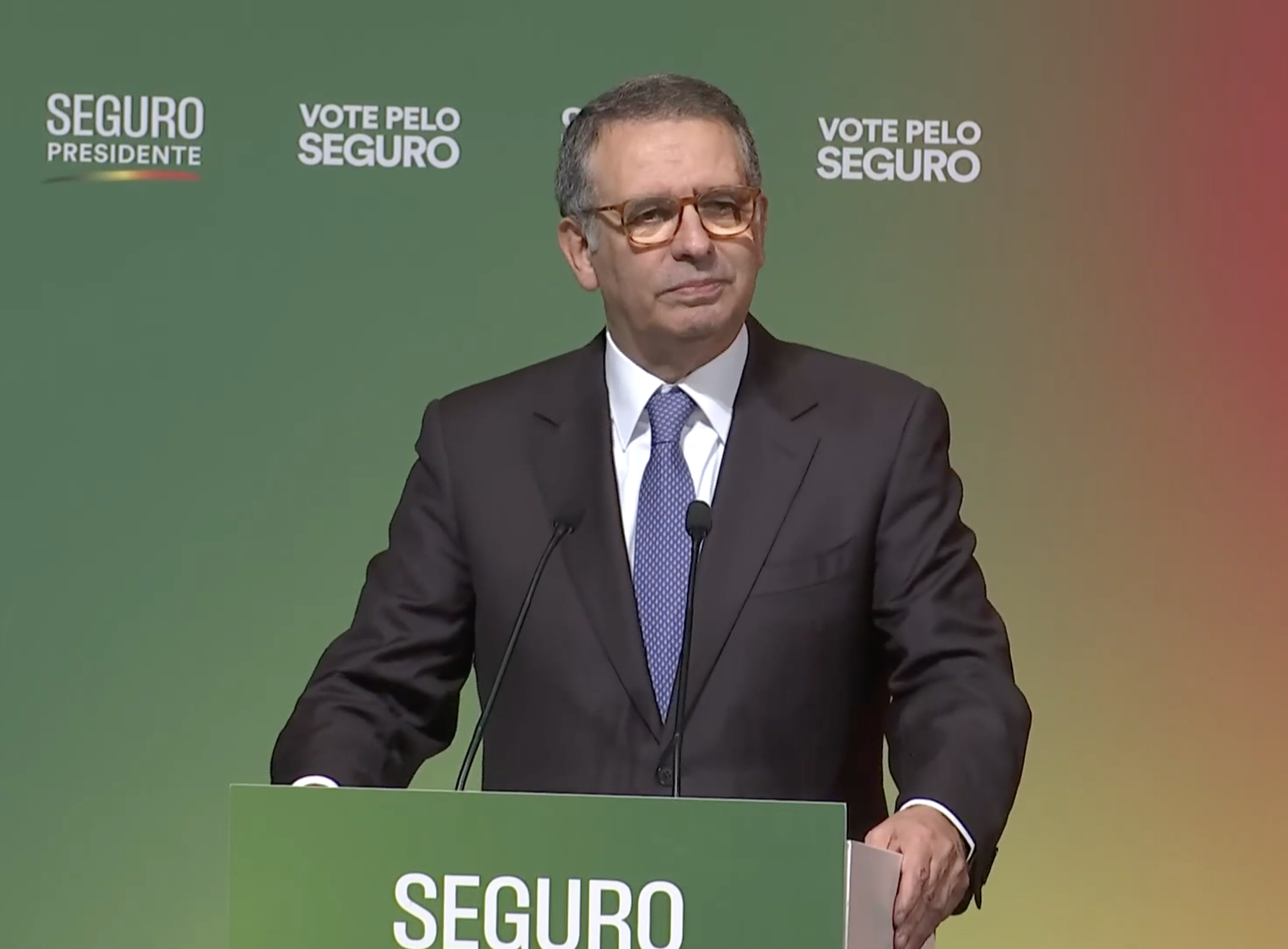
Seguro delivering his victory speech on 18 January 2026

Seguro was the clear winner of the first round, winning 18 districts, while Ventura won only Faro and Madeira; however, voters overseas gave a clear victory to Ventura. In terms of municipalities, Seguro won 225 out of the country's 308 municipalities, while Ventura was the winner in 80 of them, and Marques Mendes only won 3 municipalities.

In his first round victory speech, Seguro said that he is "free" and "lives without shackles", adding that there were "no losers" because "we are all democrats". Ventura criticized "socialism" during his election night speech, saying he would "lead the non-socialist space in Portugal" and that "socialism kills, socialism corrupts". João Cotrim Figueiredo criticized Prime Minister Luís Montenegro, who announced his neutrality in the second round, saying that he was to blame for the country having a "President from the PS". Henrique Gouveia e Melo conceded defeat, saying the results "did not meet the objectives" he had set, and that there was the "need to depoliticize the Presidency of the Republic". Luís Marques Mendes also conceded defeat, assuming full responsibility for the outcome. Catarina Martins, António Filipe, and Jorge Pinto endorsed Seguro in their election night speeches.

In the second round, Seguro achieved a landslide victory, winning 306 out of 308 municipalities, 3,115 out of 3,259 civil parishes and all 20 districts, however trailing Ventura by 1,366 in the overseas vote but winning 70 out of 107 consulates. In his speech as President-elect, Seguro promised political stability and "loyalty and institutional cooperation" with the government, while being a "demanding President". Ventura conceded defeat, but argued that the results were just a "path" to change and leading the government of Portugal, saying that the party was now the leading right-wing force in Portugal.

=== National summary ===
| Candidate | Party | First round | | Second round | |
| Candidate | Party | Votes | % | Votes | % |
|---|---|---|---|---|---|
| António José Seguro | Socialist Party (Note: Also supported by Volt Portugal.) | 1,755,563 | 31.11 | 3,502,613 | 66.84 |
| André Ventura | Chega | 1,327,021 | 23.52 | 1,737,950 | 33.16 |
| João Cotrim de Figueiredo | Liberal Initiative | 903,057 | 16.00 | | |
| Henrique Gouveia e Melo | Independent (Note: Supported by the People's Monarchist Party.) | 695,377 | 12.32 | | |
| Luís Marques Mendes | Social Democratic Party (Note: Also supported by CDS – People's Party.) | 637,442 | 11.30 | | |
| Catarina Martins | Left Bloc | 116,407 | 2.06 | | |
| António Filipe | Portuguese Communist Party (Note: Also supported by the Ecologist Party "The Greens".) | 92,644 | 1.64 | | |
| Manuel João Vieira | Independent | 60,927 | 1.08 | | |
| Jorge Pinto | LIVRE | 38,588 | 0.68 | | |
| André Pestana | Independent (Note: Supported by the Socialist Alternative Movement.) | 10,897 | 0.19 | | |
| Humberto Correia | Independent | 4,773 | 0.08 | | |
| Total | | 5,642,696 | 100.00 | 5,240,563 | 100.00 |
| Valid votes | | 5,642,696 | 97.82 | 5,240,563 | 95.01 |
| Invalid votes | | 64,565 | 1.12 | 98,342 | 1.78 |
| Blank votes | | 61,275 | 1.06 | 177,072 | 3.21 |
| Total votes | | 5,768,536 | 100.00 | 5,515,977 | 100.00 |
| Registered voters/turnout | | 11,009,803 | 52.39 | 11,025,823 | 50.03 |
Source: Comissão Nacional de Eleições

=== Results by district ===
==== First round ====
| District | Seguro | | Ventura | | Cotrim | | Gouveia | | Mendes | | Martins | | Filipe | | Vieira | | Pinto | | Pestana | | Correia | | Turnout |
| District | Votes | % | Votes | % | Votes | % | Votes | % | Votes | % | Votes | % | Votes | % | Votes | % | Votes | % | Votes | % | Votes | % | Turnout |
|---|---|---|---|---|---|---|---|---|---|---|---|---|---|---|---|---|---|---|---|---|---|---|---|
| Aveiro | 110,454 | 28.60% | 88,367 | 22.88% | 63,199 | 16.37% | 50,320 | 13.03% | 56,534 | 14.64% | 7,596 | 1.97% | 3,001 | 0.78% | 3,366 | 0.87% | 2,311 | 0.60% | 738 | 0.19% | 269 | 0.07% | 61.56% |
| Azores | 28,714 | 30.79% | 24,938 | 26.74% | 12,038 | 12.91% | 9,766 | 10.47% | 12,879 | 13.81% | 2,469 | 2.65% | 589 | 0.63% | 940 | 1.01% | 614 | 0.66% | 213 | 0.23% | 88 | 0.09% | 42.15% |
| Beja | 22,844 | 33.70% | 19,538 | 28.82% | 6,472 | 9.55% | 7,871 | 11.61% | 3,969 | 5.86% | 1,429 | 2.11% | 4,313 | 6.36% | 771 | 1.14% | 338 | 0.50% | 172 | 0.25% | 67 | 0.10% | 58.60% |
| Braga | 157,297 | 30.76% | 114,655 | 22.42% | 84,458 | 16.51% | 54,966 | 10.75% | 78,741 | 15.40% | 8,872 | 1.73% | 4,407 | 0.86% | 3,399 | 0.66% | 3,142 | 0.61% | 1,003 | 0.20% | 483 | 0.09% | 66.76% |
| Bragança | 19,291 | 30.79% | 17,496 | 27.93% | 6,159 | 9.83% | 7,203 | 11.50% | 10,513 | 16.78% | 684 | 1.09% | 377 | 0.60% | 453 | 0.72% | 255 | 0.41% | 145 | 0.23% | 72 | 0.11% | 48.37% |
| Castelo Branco | 39,838 | 40.20% | 23,331 | 23.54% | 11,086 | 11.19% | 11,763 | 11.87% | 8,793 | 8.87% | 1,566 | 1.58% | 1,071 | 1.08% | 912 | 0.92% | 477 | 0.48% | 169 | 0.17% | 87 | 0.09% | 62.39% |
| Coimbra | 77,884 | 35.47% | 42,897 | 19.54% | 32,712 | 14.90% | 29,436 | 13.41% | 24,659 | 11.23% | 4,330 | 1.97% | 3,072 | 1.40% | 2,634 | 1.20% | 1,299 | 0.59% | 531 | 0.24% | 127 | 0.06% | 60.70% |
| Évora | 26,748 | 33.46% | 19,847 | 24.83% | 10,563 | 13.21% | 10,403 | 13.01% | 5,683 | 7.11% | 1,550 | 1.94% | 3,563 | 4.46% | 1,038 | 1.30% | 359 | 0.45% | 122 | 0.15% | 60 | 0.08% | 61.51% |
| Faro | 57,217 | 26.93% | 70,148 | 33.02% | 27,652 | 13.01% | 26,561 | 12.50% | 17,691 | 8.33% | 5,120 | 2.41% | 2,901 | 1.37% | 2,871 | 1.35% | 1,378 | 0.65% | 562 | 0.26% | 368 | 0.17% | 56.48% |
| Guarda | 27,387 | 35.91% | 18,852 | 24.72% | 7,988 | 10.47% | 8,889 | 11.66% | 10,479 | 13.74% | 1,020 | 1.34% | 484 | 0.63% | 554 | 0.73% | 356 | 0.47% | 175 | 0.23% | 75 | 0.10% | 56.34% |
| Leiria | 72,835 | 29.17% | 57,635 | 23.08% | 43,085 | 17.25% | 32,072 | 12.84% | 31,626 | 12.66% | 4,484 | 1.80% | 2,745 | 1.10% | 3,143 | 1.26% | 1,494 | 0.60% | 437 | 0.17% | 169 | 0.07% | 62.10% |
| Lisbon | 389,637 | 32.45% | 240,907 | 20.06% | 231,764 | 19.30% | 155,815 | 12.98% | 104,005 | 8.66% | 25,742 | 2.14% | 25,017 | 2.08% | 16,946 | 1.41% | 8,427 | 0.70% | 1,726 | 0.14% | 679 | 0.06% | 64.12% |
| Madeira | 30,608 | 22.81% | 44,822 | 33.40% | 19,296 | 14.38% | 10,882 | 8.11% | 19,690 | 14.67% | 5,119 | 3.81% | 758 | 0.56% | 1,167 | 0.87% | 1,105 | 0.82% | 546 | 0.41% | 217 | 0.16% | 54.40% |
| Portalegre | 16,660 | 31.09% | 16,600 | 30.98% | 6,095 | 11.37% | 6,849 | 12.78% | 4,183 | 7.81% | 827 | 1.54% | 1,494 | 2.79% | 549 | 1.02% | 201 | 0.38% | 77 | 0.14% | 52 | 0.10% | 59.25% |
| Porto | 321,184 | 31.77% | 211,015 | 20.87% | 176,906 | 17.50% | 122,778 | 12.14% | 124,681 | 12.33% | 21,898 | 2.17% | 12,654 | 1.25% | 7,977 | 0.79% | 9,190 | 0.91% | 1,944 | 0.19% | 761 | 0.08% | 64.96% |
| Santarém | 65,808 | 28.58% | 64,554 | 28.04% | 33,840 | 14.70% | 30,658 | 13.32% | 22,108 | 9.60% | 4,206 | 1.83% | 4,160 | 1.81% | 2,970 | 1.29% | 1,352 | 0.59% | 429 | 0.19% | 152 | 0.07% | 62.25% |
| Setúbal | 147,961 | 32.24% | 113,990 | 24.84% | 64,258 | 14.00% | 62,704 | 13.66% | 28,937 | 6.31% | 11,557 | 2.52% | 17,895 | 3.90% | 7,344 | 1.60% | 3,156 | 0.69% | 772 | 0.17% | 372 | 0.08% | 61.88% |
| Viana do Castelo | 37,281 | 28.73% | 31,941 | 24.61% | 18,113 | 13.96% | 16,785 | 12.93% | 19,969 | 15.39% | 2,022 | 1.56% | 1,401 | 1.08% | 1,015 | 0.78% | 842 | 0.65% | 270 | 0.21% | 140 | 0.11% | 57.25% |
| Vila Real | 31,778 | 30.75% | 26,826 | 25.96% | 11,308 | 10.94% | 12,182 | 11.79% | 17,433 | 16.87% | 1,345 | 1.30% | 772 | 0.75% | 764 | 0.74% | 520 | 0.50% | 256 | 0.25% | 170 | 0.16% | 51.27% |
| Viseu | 57,315 | 30.03% | 49,174 | 25.77% | 24,796 | 12.99% | 23,586 | 12.36% | 29,236 | 15.32% | 2,632 | 1.38% | 1,215 | 0.64% | 1,453 | 0.76% | 855 | 0.45% | 387 | 0.20% | 186 | 0.10% | 58.45% |
| Overseas | 17,023 | 23.69% | 29,409 | 40.93% | 11,413 | 15.88% | 3,755 | 5.23% | 5,726 | 7.97% | 1,945 | 2.71% | 745 | 1.04% | 668 | 0.93% | 915 | 1.27% | 222 | 0.31% | 28 | 0.04% | 4.09% |

==== Second round ====
| District | Seguro | | Ventura | | Turnout |
| District | Votes | % | Votes | % | Turnout |
|---|---|---|---|---|---|
| Aveiro | 242,501 | 67.50% | 116,769 | 32.50% | 58.91% |
| Azores | 60,900 | 66.44% | 30,755 | 33.56% | 41.69% |
| Beja | 41,013 | 62.45% | 24,657 | 37.55% | 58.03% |
| Braga | 318,071 | 67.04% | 156,388 | 32.96% | 63.99% |
| Bragança | 36,199 | 60.85% | 23,290 | 39.15% | 46.97% |
| Castelo Branco | 64,131 | 68.61% | 29,339 | 31.39% | 60.06% |
| Coimbra | 146,769 | 72.18% | 56,582 | 27.82% | 57.69% |
| Évora | 49,607 | 65.80% | 25,787 | 34.20% | 59.76% |
| Faro | 114,728 | 56.89% | 86,933 | 43.11% | 54.79% |
| Guarda | 47,633 | 65.85% | 24,703 | 34.15% | 54.63% |
| Leiria | 145,305 | 66.89% | 71,931 | 33.11% | 55.92% |
| Lisbon | 770,965 | 70.50% | 322,540 | 29.50% | 60.62% |
| Madeira | 76,387 | 56.17% | 59,600 | 43.83% | 55.30% |
| Portalegre | 29,900 | 59.19% | 20,616 | 40.81% | 57.20% |
| Porto | 657,001 | 70.10% | 280,224 | 29.90% | 62.07% |
| Santarém | 127,255 | 61.08% | 81,076 | 38.92% | 58.18% |
| Setúbal | 281,051 | 66.28% | 142,980 | 33.72% | 58.61% |
| Viana do Castelo | 78,264 | 64.68% | 42,740 | 35.32% | 54.94% |
| Vila Real | 61,904 | 63.48% | 35,612 | 36.52% | 49.50% |
| Viseu | 114,840 | 64.05% | 64,445 | 35.95% | 56.28% |
| Overseas | 41,422 | 49.19% | 42,788 | 50.81% | 4.83% |

=== Maps ===
Most voted candidate in the first round, by parish.

Most voted candidate in the second round, by parish.

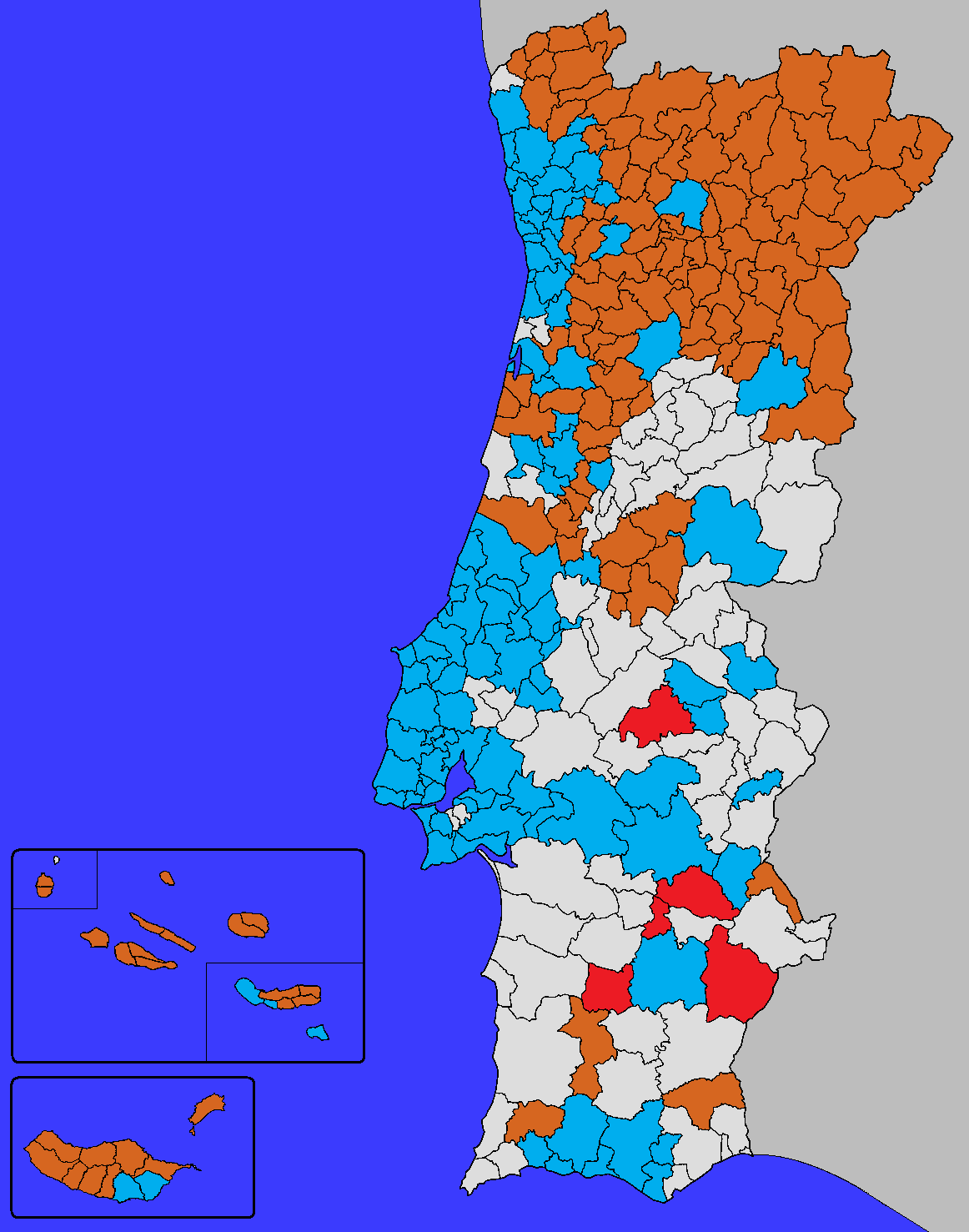
Most voted candidate that did not advance to the second round, by municipality.
João Cotrim de Figueiredo
Henrique Gouveia e Melo
Luís Marques Mendes
António Filipe
Most voted candidate in the first round by Portuguese citizens abroad, by area of jurisdiction of consular posts.
André Ventura
António José Seguro
João Cotrim de Figueiredo
Luís Marques Mendes
Henrique Gouveia e Melo
Manuel João Vieira
No votes

Most voted candidate in the second round by Portuguese citizens abroad, by area of jurisdiction of consular posts.
André Ventura
António José Seguro
No votes

=== Demographics ===
==== First round ====
| Demographic | Size | Seguro | Ventura | Cotrim | Gouveia | Mendes | Others |
|---|---|---|---|---|---|---|---|
| Total vote | 100% | 31.1% | 23.5% | 16.0% | 12.3% | 11.3% | 5.8% |
Sex
| Men | —N/a | 28% | 25% | 20% | 10% | 10% | 7% |
| Women | —N/a | 38% | 19% | 16% | 11% | 11% | 5% |
Age
| 18–34 years old | —N/a | 30% | 20% | 33% | 5% | 6% | 6% |
| 35–64 years old | —N/a | 31% | 27% | 18% | 11% | 8% | 5% |
| 65+ years old | —N/a | 37% | 18% | 10% | 15% | 16% | 4% |
Education
| No high-school | —N/a | 32% | 34% | 5% | 13% | 13% | 3% |
| High-school | —N/a | 26% | 29% | 19% | 10% | 9% | 7% |
| College graduate | —N/a | 38% | 11% | 25% | 10% | 10% | 6% |
Vote decision
| Less than a week ago | —N/a | 38% | 14% | 19% | 12% | 11% | 6% |
| A week or more ago | —N/a | 31% | 25% | 19% | 10% | 11% | 4% |
2025 legislative vote
| AD | 32% | 17% | 7% | 31% | 14% | 29% | 2% |
| PS | 23% | 71% | 7% | 5% | 11% | 3% | 3% |
| CH | 23% | 3% | 82% | 8% | 4% | 2% | 1% |
Source: ICS/ISCTE/Pitagórica exit poll

==== Second round ====
| Demographic | Size | Seguro | Ventura |
|---|---|---|---|
| Total vote | 100% | 66.8% | 33.2% |
Sex
| Men | —N/a | 63% | 37% |
| Women | —N/a | 75% | 25% |
Age
| 18–34 years old | —N/a | 65% | 35% |
| 35–64 years old | —N/a | 65% | 35% |
| 65+ years old | —N/a | 76% | 24% |
Education
| No high-school | —N/a | 65% | 35% |
| High-school | —N/a | 61% | 39% |
| College graduate | —N/a | 78% | 22% |
2025 legislative vote
| AD | 32% | 74% | 26% |
| PS | 23% | 94% | 6% |
| CH | 23% | 4% | 96% |
| Others | 22% | 83% | 17% |
First round vote
| António José Seguro | 31% | 98% | 2% |
| André Ventura | 24% | 3% | 97% |
| João Cotrim Figueiredo | 16% | 69% | 31% |
| Henrique Gouveia Melo | 12% | 81% | 19% |
| Luís Marques Mendes | 11% | 85% | 15% |
Source: ICS/ISCTE/Pitagórica exit poll

| Demographic | Size | Seguro | Ventura |
|---|---|---|---|
| Total vote | 100% | 66.8% | 33.2% |
Sex
| Men | 47% | 59% | 41% |
| Women | 53% | 74% | 26% |
Age
| 18–24 years old | 9% | 62% | 38% |
| 25–34 years old | 13% | 58% | 42% |
| 35–44 years old | 16% | 58% | 42% |
| 45–54 years old | 22% | 66% | 34% |
| 55–64 years old | 19% | 70% | 30% |
| 65+ years old | 20% | 81% | 19% |
Education
| No high-school | 15% | 69% | 31% |
| High-school | 28% | 58% | 42% |
| College graduate | 36% | 75% | 26% |
Monthly income
| Until 800€ | 8% | 70% | 30% |
| 801€–1500€ | 21% | 63% | 37% |
| 1501€–2500€ | 20% | 69% | 31% |
| 2501€–3500€ | 12% | 71% | 29% |
| 3500€+ | 10% | 69% | 31% |
2025 legislative vote
| AD | 32% | 77% | 23% |
| PS | 23% | 96% | 4% |
| CH | 23% | 5% | 95% |
| IL | 5% | 72% | 28% |
| L | 4% | 97% | 3% |
| CDU | 3% | 99% | 1% |
| BE | 2% | 99% | 1% |
| PAN | 1% | 83% | 17% |
First round vote
| António José Seguro | 31% | 98% | 2% |
| André Ventura | 24% | 2% | 98% |
| João Cotrim Figueiredo | 16% | 65% | 35% |
| Henrique Gouveia Melo | 12% | 80% | 20% |
| Luís Marques Mendes | 11% | 89% | 11% |
| Others | 6% | 93% | 7% |
Source: CESOP–UCP exit poll

== See also ==
- 2026 elections in the European Union
- 2002 French presidential election, a very similar, albeit unrelated, election involving a far-right candidate going to the second round
