= André Pestana =

Portuguese trade unionist

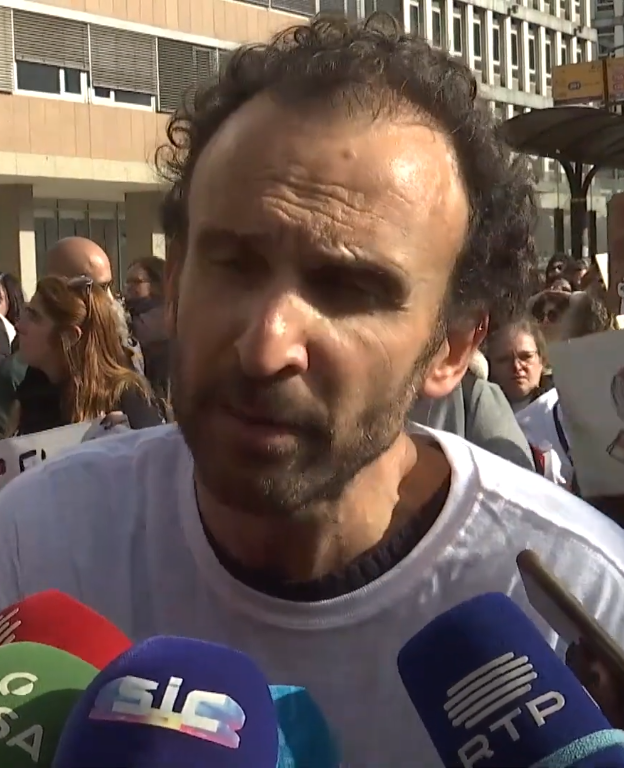
André Pestana in 2023.

André Pestana da Silva (born 10 January 1977, Coimbra) is a teacher, who has been the national leader of the Union of All Education Professionals (S.T.O.P.) since September 2022. He was a candidate in the 2026 Portuguese presidential election.

Pestana was a member of the Portuguese Communist Youth, the youth of the Portuguese Communist Party, before leaving it citing the lack of democracy in the communist regimes. He later joined the Left Bloc, which he left after it split into the Socialist Alternative Movement (MAS), having been one of its founders.

He left MAS in 2023 due to his criticism of Renata Cambra, then leader of the party.

He ran for President in 2026, getting just 0.2% of the votes.

== Electoral history ==
=== Presidential election, 2026 ===
Ballot: 18 January and 8 February 2026
Candidate	First round		Second round	
Candidate	Votes	%	Votes	%
António José Seguro	1,755,563	31.1	3,502,613	66.8
André Ventura	1,327,021	23.5	1,737,950	33.2
João Cotrim de Figueiredo	903,057	16.0		
Henrique Gouveia e Melo	695,377	12.3		
Luís Marques Mendes	637,442	11.3		
Catarina Martins	116,407	2.1		
António Filipe	92,644	1.6		
Manuel João Vieira	60,927	1.1		
Jorge Pinto	38,588	0.7		
André Pestana	10,897	0.2		
Humberto Correia	4,773	0.1		
Blank/Invalid ballots	125,840	–	275,414	–
Turnout	5,768,536	52.39	5,515,977	50.03
Source: Comissão Nacional de Eleições
