= António Filipe (politician) =

Portuguese jurist, professor and politician

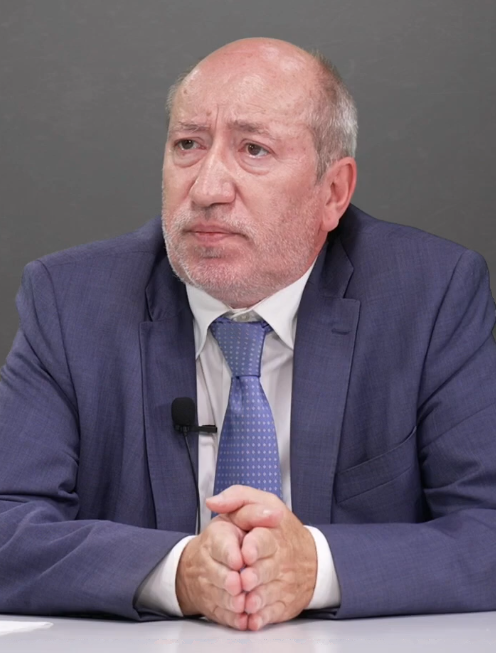
- António Filipe in 2025

Vice President of the Assembly of the Republic
- In office 25 October 2019 – 28 March 2022
- President: Eduardo Ferro Rodrigues
- In office 20 June 2011 – 28 October 2015
- President: Assunção Esteves
- In office 4 April 2002 – 15 October 2009
- President: João Bosco Mota Amaral; Jaime Gama

Member of the Assembly of the Republic
- In office 26 March 2024 – 18 May 2025
- Constituency: Lisbon
- In office 15 October 2009 – 28 March 2022
- Constituency: Santarém
- In office 13 August 1987 – 15 October 2009
- Constituency: Lisbon

Personal details
- Born: António Filipe Gaião Rodrigues; 28 January 1963 (age 63) Lisbon, Portugal
- Party: Portuguese Communist Party
- Education: University of Lisbon; Universidade Lusófona; University of Leiden
- Occupation: Jurist • Politician

António Filipe Gaião Rodrigues (born 28 January 1963) is a Portuguese jurist, professor and politician, former member of the Assembly of the Republic, who had been elected in representation of the Portuguese Communist Party from the Unitary Democratic Coalition's list, for the Santarém constituency between 2009 and 2022, and for the Lisbon constituency since 2024. He is a candidate in the 2026 Portuguese presidential election

A licentiate in law for the University of Lisbon, he received his master's in political science from the Universidade Lusófona, and his doctorate in constitutional law from the Leiden University. António Filipe, aside from being a deputy, exercises the duties of professor in the European University (previously known as ISLA Campus Lisboa), which is part of the Laureate International Universities.

A deputy since the 5th legislature, has occupied the office of Vice-President of the Assembly of the Republic in the 9th, 10th, 12th, 13th and 14th legislatures. In local government, he was a member of the Municipal Assembly of Amadora between 1993 and 2002 and alderman of the Municipal Chamber of Amadora in 2002 and a member of the Municipal Assembly of Sintra since 2005. He was a board member of the Portuguese Communist Youth between 1986 and 1995 and is currently a member of the PCP's Central Committee.

== Electoral history ==
=== Amadora City Council election, 2001 ===
Ballot: 16 December 2001
Party	Candidate	Votes	%	Seats	+/−
PS	Joaquim Raposo	32,298	45.4	6	+2
PSD/CDS	José Luís Vieira de Castro	17,507	24.7	3	±0
CDU	António Filipe	15,138	21.3	2	–2
BE	–	1,337	1.9	0	new
PCTP/MRPP	–	1,169	1.7	0	±0
MPT	–	629	0.9	0	new
Blank/Invalid ballots		2,894	4.1	–	–
Turnout		70,972	47.71	11	±0
Source: Autárquicas 2001

=== Presidential election, 2026 ===
Ballot: 18 January and 8 February 2026
Candidate	First round		Second round	
Candidate	Votes	%	Votes	%
António José Seguro	1,755,563	31.1	3,502,613	66.8
André Ventura	1,327,021	23.5	1,737,950	33.2
João Cotrim de Figueiredo	903,057	16.0		
Henrique Gouveia e Melo	695,377	12.3		
Luís Marques Mendes	637,442	11.3		
Catarina Martins	116,407	2.1		
António Filipe	92,644	1.6		
Manuel João Vieira	60,927	1.1		
Jorge Pinto	38,588	0.7		
André Pestana	10,897	0.2		
Humberto Correia	4,773	0.1		
Blank/Invalid ballots	125,840	–	275,414	–
Turnout	5,768,536	52.39	5,515,977	50.03
Source: Comissão Nacional de Eleições
