= Manuel João Vieira =

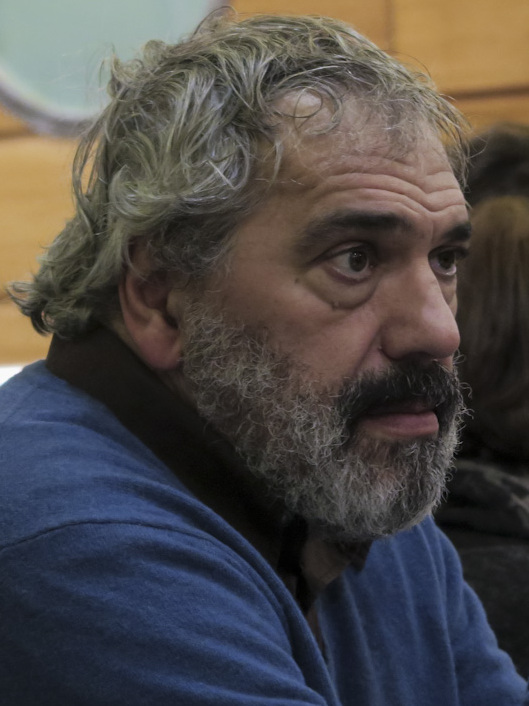
- Vieira in 2018

Background information
- Born: 17 October 1962 (age 63)
- Occupations: Singer, Composer, Painter, University Professor

Manuel João Gonçalves Rodrigues Vieira (born 17 October 1962) is a Portuguese musician, painter, university professor and satirical politician. He is the vocalist of Ena Pá 2000 and Irmãos Catita, bands he founded in 1984 and 1991, respectively.

He unsuccessfully ran for President of Portugal in the 2001, 2011 and 2016 presidential elections. In the 2026 presidential election, he gathered the required 7500 valid signatures to be on the ballot for the first time. Among his campaign promises are giving a Ferrari to each Portuguese and wine on tap, while his campaign motto is "I'll only give up if I'm elected". Vieira ended up getting over 60 thousand votes and 1.1% of the votes.

== Electoral history ==
=== Presidential election, 2026 ===
Ballot: 18 January and 8 February 2026
| Candidate | First round | | Second round | |
| Candidate | Votes | % | Votes | % |
|---|---|---|---|---|
| António José Seguro | 1,755,563 | 31.1 | 3,502,613 | 66.8 |
| André Ventura | 1,327,021 | 23.5 | 1,737,950 | 33.2 |
| João Cotrim de Figueiredo | 903,057 | 16.0 | | |
| Henrique Gouveia e Melo | 695,377 | 12.3 | | |
| Luís Marques Mendes | 637,442 | 11.3 | | |
| Catarina Martins | 116,407 | 2.1 | | |
| António Filipe | 92,644 | 1.6 | | |
| Manuel João Vieira | 60,927 | 1.1 | | |
| Jorge Pinto | 38,588 | 0.7 | | |
| André Pestana | 10,897 | 0.2 | | |
| Humberto Correia | 4,773 | 0.1 | | |
| Blank/Invalid ballots | 125,840 | – | 275,414 | – |
| Turnout | 5,768,536 | 52.39 | 5,515,977 | 50.03 |
Source: Comissão Nacional de Eleições
