= Opinion polling on the Marcelo Rebelo de Sousa presidency =

Opinion polling on the presidency of Marcelo Rebelo de Sousa was regularly conducted by Portuguese pollsters during his term in office between March 2016 and March 2026.

Poll results are listed in the table below in reverse chronological order, showing the most recent first. The highest percentage figure in each polling survey is displayed in bold, and the background shaded in the leading opinion colour. In the instance that there is a tie, then no figure is shaded but both are displayed in bold. The lead column on the right shows the percentage-point difference between the two options, approval and disapproval. Poll results use the date the survey's fieldwork was done, as opposed to the date of publication.

== Polling ==
=== Graphical summary ===
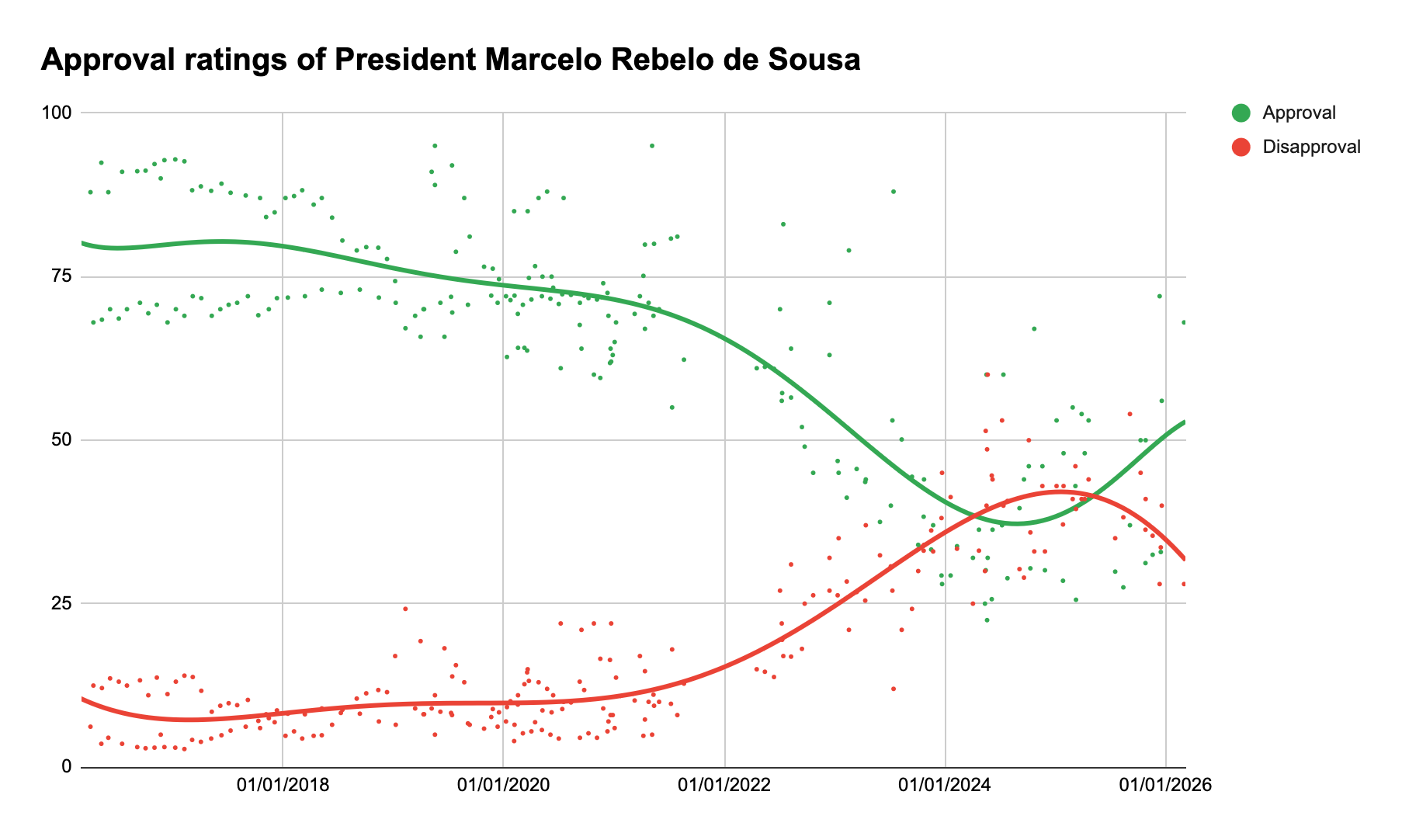

=== Second Term (2021–2026) ===
The table below lists the evolution of public opinion on the President's performance in office during his second term, starting on 9 March 2021, following his re-election victory on the 2021 presidential election, and ending on 9 March 2026.

Polling firm	Fieldwork date	Sample size	Marcelo Rebelo de Sousa			
Polling firm	Fieldwork date	Sample size	Approve	Disapprove	No opinion	Lead
Aximage	2–3 Mar 2026	551	**68**	28	4	40
Pitagórica	11–19 Dec 2025	1,000	**56**	40	4	16
Intercampus	12–16 Dec 2025	611	32.9	**33.6**	33.5	0.7
UCP–CESOP	4–12 Dec 2025	1,185	**72**	28	—N/a	44
Intercampus	14–19 Nov 2025	611	32.5	**35.4**	32.1	2.9
Aximage	23–27 Oct 2025	651	**50**	41	9	8
Intercampus	20–26 Oct 2025	609	31.2	**36.3**	32.5	5.1
Pitagórica	6–10 Oct 2025	625	**50**	45	5	5
Aximage	2–5 Sep 2025	570	37	**54**	9	17
Intercampus	7–14 Aug 2025	611	27.5	**38.2**	34.3	10.7
Intercampus	11–18 Jul 2025	606	29.9	**35.0**	35.1	5.1
Pitagórica	14–21 Apr 2025	1,000	**53**	44	3	9
Aximage	4–8 Apr 2025	667	**48**	41	10	7
Pitagórica	24–29 Mar 2025	1,000	**54**	41	5	13
Intercampus	4–10 Mar 2025	620	25.6	**39.5**	34.9	13.9
Aximage	6–8 Mar 2025	601	43	**46**	11	3
Pitagórica	23–27 Feb 2025	400	**55**	41	4	14
Aximage	23–28 Jan 2025	800	**48**	43	9	5
Intercampus	21–26 Jan 2025	638	28.5	**37.1**	34.4	8.6
Pitagórica	28 Dec 2024–5 Jan 2025	400	**53**	43	4	10
Intercampus	21–27 Nov 2024	605	30.1	**33.0**	36.9	2.9
Aximage	13–19 Nov 2024	802	**46**	43	11	3
UCP–CESOP	17–23 Oct 2024	1,025	**67**	33	—N/a	34
Intercampus	4–10 Oct 2024	612	30.4	**35.9**	33.7	5.5
Aximage	30 Sep–5 Oct 2024	802	46	**50**	4	4
Aximage	6–19 Sep 2024	818	**44**	29	27	15
Intercampus	29 Aug–4 Sep 2024	604	**39.6**	30.3	30.1	9.3
Intercampus	19–26 Jul 2024	609	28.9	**40.7**	30.4	11.8
UCP–CESOP	8–13 Jul 2024	957	**60**	40	—N/a	20
Aximage	3–8 Jul 2024	801	37	**53**	10	16
Marktest	5–7 Jun 2024	440	36.3	**44.0**	19.7	7.7
Intercampus	29 May–4 Jun 2024	604	25.7	**44.6**	29.8	18.9
Aximage	17–22 May 2024	801	32	**60**	8	28
Intercampus	12–20 May 2024	609	22.5	**48.6**	28.9	26.1
UCP–CESOP	13–18 May 2024	965	**60**	40	—N/a	20
Marktest	7–15 May 2024	497	30.1	**51.4**	18.5	21.3
Duplimétrica	6–13 May 2024	800	25	**30**	45	5
Intercampus	18–23 Apr 2024	605	**36.3**	33.1	30.6	3.2
Aximage	29 Mar–3 Apr 2024	805	**32**	25	43	7
Intercampus	6–10 Feb 2024	608	**33.8**	33.4	32.8	0.4
Intercampus	16–20 Jan 2024	637	29.3	**41.3**	29.4	12.0
Aximage	18–23 Dec 2023	805	28	**45**	27	17
Intercampus	18–21 Dec 2023	611	29.3	**38.1**	32.6	8.8
Aximage	18–23 Nov 2023	802	**37**	33	30	4
Intercampus	14–17 Nov 2023	602	33.3	**36.2**	30.4	2.9
Aximage	18–24 Oct 2023	805	**44**	34	22	10
Intercampus	18–23 Oct 2023	604	**38.3**	33.1	28.6	5.2
Aximage	2–5 Oct 2023	601	**34**	30	36	4
Intercampus	9–14 Sep 2023	614	**44.4**	24.2	31.4	20.2
Intercampus	7–11 Aug 2023	607	**50.1**	21.0	28.9	29.1
UCP–CESOP	6–15 Jul 2023	1,006	**88**	12	—N/a	76
Aximage	6–11 Jul 2023	800	**53**	27	20	26
Intercampus	3–6 Jul 2023	623	**40.0**	30.7	29.3	9.3
Intercampus	25–31 May 2023	611	**37.5**	32.4	30.1	5.1
Aximage	10–14 Apr 2023	805	**44**	37	19	7
Intercampus	6–12 Apr 2023	610	**43.6**	25.5	30.9	18.1
Intercampus	9–15 Mar 2023	613	**45.6**	26.8	27.6	18.8
UCP–CESOP	9–17 Feb 2023	1,002	**79**	21	—N/a	58
Intercampus	3–10 Feb 2023	602	**41.2**	28.4	30.4	12.8
Aximage	10–14 Jan 2023	805	**45**	35	20	10
Intercampus	6–11 Jan 2023	605	**46.8**	26.3	27.0	20.5
Pitagórica	9–15 Dec 2022	828	**63**	32	5	31
ICS/ISCTE	3–15 Dec 2022	809	**71**	27	2	44
Intercampus	17–22 Oct 2022	607	**45.0**	26.3	28.7	18.7
Aximage	21–24 Sep 2022	810	**49**	25	26	24
Intercampus	9–15 Sep 2022	606	**52.0**	18.1	29.9	33.9
Intercampus	3–10 Aug 2022	605	**56.5**	16.9	26.6	39.6
Pitagórica	28 Jul–10 Aug 2022	828	**64**	31	5	33
UCP–CESOP	11–15 Jul 2022	885	**83**	17	—N/a	66
Intercampus	6–11 Jul 2022	605	**57.2**	19.5	23.3	37.7
Aximage	5–10 Jul 2022	810	**56**	22	22	34
Pitagórica	21 Jun–4 Jul 2022	828	**70**	27	3	43
Intercampus	8–14 Jun 2022	611	**60.9**	13.8	25.3	47.1
Intercampus	7–15 May 2022	611	**61.2**	14.6	24.2	46.6
Aximage	12–18 Apr 2022	807	**61**	15	24	46
Intercampus	13–20 Aug 2021	612	**62.3**	12.8	24.9	49.5
Eurosondagem	26–29 Jul 2021	1,025	**81.1**	8.0	10.9	73.1
Aximage	10–12 Jul 2021	763	**55**	18	27	37
Eurosondagem	5–8 Jul 2021	1,022	**80.8**	9.7	9.5	71.1
Aximage	26–30 May 2021	796	**70**	10	20	60
Eurosondagem	10–13 May 2021	1,008	**80.0**	9.4	10.6	70.6
Intercampus	5–11 May 2021	610	**69.0**	11.1	19.9	57.9
UCP–CESOP	3–7 May 2021	1,123	**95**	5	—N/a	90
Aximage	22–25 Apr 2021	830	**71**	10	19	61
Intercampus	7–13 Apr 2021	609	**67.0**	14.7	18.3	52.3
ICS/ISCTE	5–13 Apr 2021	802	**79.9**	7.3	12.8	72.6
Eurosondagem	5–8 Apr 2021	1,020	**75.1**	4.8	20.1	70.3
Aximage	24–27 Mar 2021	830	**72**	17	11	55
Intercampus	4–10 Mar 2021	615	**69.3**	10.2	20.5	59.1

=== First Term (2016–2021) ===
The table below lists the evolution of public opinion on the President's performance in office during his first term, starting on 9 March 2016, following his victory in the 2016 presidential election, and ending on 9 March 2021.

Polling firm	Fieldwork date	Sample size	Marcelo Rebelo de Sousa			
Polling firm	Fieldwork date	Sample size	Approve	Disapprove	No opinion	Lead
Intercampus	4–7 Jan 2021	603	68.0	13.7	18.2	54.3
Pitagórica	22 Dec 2020–3 Jan 2021	629	65	6	29	59
Pitagórica	17–27 Dec 2020	629	63	8	29	55
Aximage	19–22 Dec 2020	812	62	22	16	40
Pitagórica	17–20 Dec 2020	629	64	8	28	56
Intercampus	14–18 Dec 2020	603	61.8	16.4	21.8	45.4
Pitagórica	10–13 Dec 2020	629	69	7	24	62
Eurosondagem	7–10 Dec 2020	1,020	72.7	5.5	21.8	67.2
Aximage	23–26 Nov 2020	647	74	9	17	65
Intercampus	9–16 Nov 2020	622	59.5	16.6	24.0	42.9
Eurosondagem	2–5 Nov 2020	1,011	71.5	4.5	24.0	67.0
Aximage	22–26 Oct 2020	694	60	22	18	38
Eurosondagem	5–8 Oct 2020	1,010	71.7	5.2	23.1	66.5
ICS/ISCTE	14–24 Sep 2020	801	72.1	11.8	16.1	60.3
Aximage	12–15 Sep 2020	603	64	21	15	43
Eurosondagem	7–10 Sep 2020	1,022	71.0	4.5	24.5	66.5
Intercampus	4–9 Sep 2020	614	67.6	13.1	19.4	54.5
Intercampus	6–11 Aug 2020	601	72.2	9.9	17.9	62.3
UCP–CESOP	13–18 Jul 2020	1,482	87	10	3	77
Intercampus	9–13 Jul 2020	620	72.3	8.9	18.9	63.4
Aximage	5–8 Jul 2020	624	61	22	17	39
Eurosondagem	29 Jun–2 Jul 2020	1,025	70.8	4.4	24.8	66.4
Intercampus	9–13 Jun 2020	610	73.3	11.0	15.7	62.3
Aximage	5–8 Jun 2020	605	75.0	8.4	16.6	66.6
Eurosondagem	1–4 Jun 2020	1,021	71.6	5.0	23.4	66.6
Pitagórica	16–24 May 2020	802	88	12	—N/a	76
Intercampus	5–9 May 2020	620	75.0	8.7	16.3	66.3
Eurosondagem	4–7 May 2020	1,005	72.0	5.7	22.3	66.3
Pitagórica	15–26 Apr 2020	605	87	13	—N/a	74
Intercampus	9–14 Apr 2020	623	76.6	6.9	16.5	69.7
Eurosondagem	29 Mar–2 Apr 2020	1,008	71.5	5.5	23.0	66.0
Marktest	24–25 Mar 2020	505	74.8	13.2	12.0	61.6
Pitagórica	13–21 Mar 2020	605	85	15	—N/a	70
Intercampus	13–19 Mar 2020	611	63.7	14.5	21.8	49.2
Aximage	7–10 Mar 2020	680	64.1	12.7	23.2	51.4
Eurosondagem	1–5 Mar 2020	1,011	70.7	5.2	24.1	65.5
Aximage	14–18 Feb 2020	839	64.1	11.0	24.9	53.1
Intercampus	11–17 Feb 2020	614	69.3	9.6	21.1	59.7
Eurosondagem	2–6 Feb 2020	1,020	72.1	6.5	21.4	65.6
ICS/ISCTE	22 Jan–5 Feb 2020	800	85	4	11	81
Intercampus	19–24 Jan 2020	619	71.4	10.1	18.5	61.3
Aximage	9–12 Jan 2020	640	62.7	9.2	28.1	53.5
Eurosondagem	5–9 Jan 2020	1,010	72.0	7.0	21.0	65.0
Intercampus	12–17 Dec 2019	606	74.6	8.4	17.0	66.2
Eurosondagem	8–12 Dec 2019	1,019	71.0	6.2	22.8	64.8
Intercampus	20–26 Nov 2019	604	76.2	8.9	14.9	67.3
Eurosondagem	17–21 Nov 2019	1,011	72.1	7.7	20.2	64.4
Intercampus	22–28 Oct 2019	604	76.5	5.9	17.6	70.6
Intercampus	2–11 Sep 2019	801	81.1	6.5	12.4	74.6
Eurosondagem	1–5 Sep 2019	601	70.7	6.7	22.6	64.0
Pitagórica	12–24 Aug 2019	1,525	87	13	—N/a	74
Aximage	20–27 Jul 2019	1,354	78.8	15.6	5.6	63.2
Aximage	12–15 Jul 2019	601	69.5	13.9	16.6	55.6
Pitagórica	8–14 Jul 2019	800	92	8	—N/a	84
Eurosondagem	7–11 Jul 2019	1,011	71.9	8.3	19.8	63.6
Aximage	13–19 Jun 2019	605	65.8	18.2	16.0	47.6
Eurosondagem	2–6 Jun 2019	1,008	71.0	8.5	20.5	62.5
UCP–CESOP	16–19 May 2019	1,882	95	5	—N/a	90
Pitagórica	10–19 May 2019	605	89	11	—N/a	78.0
Aximage	3–8 May 2019	600	65.7	17.1	17.2	48.6
Pitagórica	3–13 Apr 2019	605	91	9	—N/a	82
Eurosondagem	7–11 Apr 2019	1,019	70.0	8.1	21.9	61.9
Aximage	30 Mar–1 Apr 2019	602	65.8	19.3	14.9	46.5
Eurosondagem	10–14 Mar 2019	1,020	69.0	9.0	22.0	60.0
Aximage	5–10 Feb 2019	602	67.1	24.2	8.7	42.9
Eurosondagem	2–9 Jan 2019	1,010	71.0	6.5	22.5	64.5
Aximage	4–7 Jan 2019	608	74.3	17.0	8.7	57.3
Aximage	7–11 Dec 2018	602	77.7	11.5	10.8	66.2
Eurosondagem	7–14 Nov 2018	1,018	71.8	7.0	21.2	64.8
Aximage	9–12 Nov 2018	603	79.4	11.8	8.8	67.6
Aximage	1–3 Oct 2018	601	79.5	11.3	9.2	68.2
Eurosondagem	5–12 Sep 2018	1,008	73.0	8.7	18.3	64.3
Aximage	1–2 Sep 2018	603	79.0	10.5	10.5	68.5
Aximage	13–16 Jul 2018	600	80.5	8.8	10.7	71.7
Eurosondagem	4–11 Jul 2018	1,011	72.5	8.3	19.2	64.2
Aximage	9–12 Jun 2018	602	84.0	6.5	9.5	77.5
Aximage	5–9 May 2018	600	87.0	4.9	8.1	82.1
Eurosondagem	3–9 May 2018	1,008	73.0	9.0	18.0	64.0
Aximage	8–12 Apr 2018	601	86.0	4.8	9.2	81.2
Eurosondagem	8–14 Mar 2018	1,010	72.0	8.1	19.9	63.9
Aximage	2–5 Mar 2018	605	88.2	4.4	7.4	83.8
Aximage	3–6 Feb 2018	603	87.3	5.5	7.2	81.8
Eurosondagem	14–17 Jan 2018	1,018	71.8	8.2	20.0	63.6
Aximage	6–9 Jan 2018	600	87.0	4.8	8.2	82.2
Eurosondagem	6–12 Dec 2017	1,017	71.7	8.7	19.6	63.0
Aximage	1–4 Dec 2017	603	84.8	6.9	8.3	77.9
Eurosondagem	8–15 Nov 2017	1,010	70.0	7.5	22.5	62.5
Aximage	4–6 Nov 2017	600	84.1	8.1	7.8	76.0
Aximage	14–17 Oct 2017	603	87.0	6.0	7.0	81.0
Eurosondagem	4–11 Oct 2017	1,011	69.1	7.1	23.8	62.0
Eurosondagem	31 Aug–6 Sep 2017	1,007	72.0	10.3	17.7	61.7
Aximage	29–30 Aug 2017	597	87.4	6.2	6.4	81.2
Eurosondagem	27 Jul–2 Aug 2017	1,011	71.0	9.5	19.5	61.5
Aximage	6–11 Jul 2017	604	87.8	5.6	6.6	82.2
Eurosondagem	28 Jun–5 Jul 2017	1,008	70.7	9.8	19.5	60.9
Aximage	7–11 Jun 2017	601	89.2	4.9	5.9	84.3
Eurosondagem	1–7 Jun 2017	1,010	70.0	9.4	20.6	60.6
Eurosondagem	3–10 May 2017	1,005	69.0	8.5	22.5	60.5
Aximage	5–8 May 2017	603	88.1	4.4	7.5	83.7
Eurosondagem	30 Mar–5 Apr 2017	1,003	71.7	11.7	16.6	60.0
Aximage	2–4 Apr 2017	600	88.8	3.9	7.3	84.9
Eurosondagem	1–8 Mar 2017	1,011	72.0	13.8	14.2	58.2
Aximage	4–6 Mar 2017	608	88.2	4.4	7.4	83.8
Aximage	5–8 Feb 2017	601	92.6	2.8	4.6	89.8
Eurosondagem	1–8 Feb 2017	1,017	69.0	14.0	17.0	55.0
Eurosondagem	5–11 Jan 2017	1,010	70.0	13.1	16.9	56.9
Aximage	6–9 Jan 2017	603	92.9	3.0	4.1	89.9
Eurosondagem	7–14 Dec 2016	1,016	68.0	11.2	20.8	56.8
Aximage	2–4 Dec 2016	605	92.8	3.1	4.1	89.7
UCP–CESOP	19–22 Nov 2016	977	90	5	5	85
Eurosondagem	2–9 Nov 2016	1,011	70.7	13.7	15.6	57.0
Aximage	31 Oct–1 Nov 2016	601	92.2	3.0	4.8	89.2
Eurosondagem	6–12 Oct 2016	1,010	69.4	11.0	19.6	58.4
Aximage	1–3 Oct 2016	608	91.2	2.9	5.9	88.3
Eurosondagem	7–14 Sep 2016	1,009	71.0	13.3	15.7	57.7
Aximage	2–5 Sep 2016	603	91.1	3.1	5.8	88.0
Eurosondagem	26 Jul–2 Aug 2016	1,005	70.0	12.5	17.5	57.5
Aximage	15–17 Jul 2016	606	91.0	3.1	5.9	87.9
Eurosondagem	30 Jun–6 Jul 2016	1,023	68.6	13.1	18.3	55.5
Eurosondagem	1 Jun–7 Jun 2016	1,025	70.0	13.6	16.4	56.4
Aximage	30 May–1 Jun 2016	606	87.9	4.5	7.6	83.4
Eurosondagem	5–11 May 2016	1,031	68.4	12.1	19.5	56.3
Aximage	7–9 May 2016	600	92.4	3.6	4.0	88.8
Eurosondagem	7–13 Apr 2016	1,026	68.0	12.5	19.5	55.5
Aximage	2–3 Apr 2016	601	87.9	6.2	5.9	81.7

== See also ==
- Opinion polling for the 2016 Portuguese presidential election
- Opinion polling for the 2021 Portuguese presidential election
