= Battle of Dien Bien Phu order of battle =

List of units involved in this battle

This is a list of units and commands that took part in the Battle of Dien Bien Phu during the First Indochina War, with the major commands that took part in operations.

== Operational Group North-West (GONO) ==
=== Command ===
Group	Commander	Main units
Operational Group North-West (GONO)	Colonel Christian de Castries	
Group Mobile 6 (GM 6)	Lieutenant Colonel André Lalande	3/3 REI; 2/1 RTA; 5/7 RTA
Group Mobile 9 (GM 9)	Lieutenant Colonel Jules Gaucher	1/13 DBLE; 3/13 DBLE; 1/2 REI; 3/3 RTA
2nd Airborne Brigade (GAP 2)	Lieutenant Colonel Pierre Langlais	1 BEP; 8 BPC; 5 BPVN
Artillery	Colonel Charles Piroth	

=== Infantry ===
Unit	Commander	Position
1st Battalion/13th Foreign Legion Demi-Brigade (1/13 DBLE)	Major de Brinon/Major Robert Coutant	Claudine
3rd Battalion/13th Foreign Legion Demi-Brigade (3/13 DBLE)	Major Paul Pégot	Béatrice
1st Battalion/2nd Foreign Infantry Regiment (1/2 REI)	Major Clémençon	Huguette
3rd Battalion/3rd Foreign Infantry Regiment (3/3 REI)	Major Henri Grand d'Esnon	Isabelle
2nd Battalion/1st Algerian Rifle Regiment (2/1 RTA)	Capitaine Jean Sallot des Noyers; Capitaine Pierre Jeancenelle	Isabelle
3rd Battalion/3rd Algerian Rifle Regiment (3/3 RTA)	Capitaine Jean Garandeau	Dominique
5th Battalion/7th Algerian Rifle Regiment (5/7 RTA)	Major Roland de Mecquenem	Gabrielle
1st Battalion/4th Moroccan Rifle Regiment (1/4 RTM)	Major Jean Nicolas	Eliane
2nd Tai Battalion (BT 2)	Major Maurice Chenel	Eliane
3rd Tai Battalion (BT 3)	Major Léopold Thimonnier	Anne-Marie

=== Parachute Infantry ===
Unit	Commander
1st Foreign Parachute Battalion (1st BEP)	Major Maurice Guiraud
2nd Foreign Parachute Battalion (2nd BEP)	Major Hubert Liesenfelt
1st Colonial Parachute Battalion (1st BPC)	Capitaine Guy Bazin de Bezon
6th Colonial Parachute Battalion (6th BPC)	Major Marcel Bigeard
8th Shock Parachute Battalion (8th BPC)	Major Pierre Tourret
5th Vietnamese Parachute Battalion (5th BPVN)	Capitaine André Botella
2nd Battalion/1st Parachute Chasseur Regiment (II/1RCP)	Major Jean Bréchignac

=== Armoured Cavalry ===
Unit	Commander	Tank	Position
3rd Squadron/1st Light Horse Regiment (3/1 RCC)	Capitaine Yves Hervouët	M24 Chaffee (x10)	Claudine; Isabelle

=== Artillery ===
Unit	Commander	-	Position
2nd Group/4th Colonial Artillery Regiment (II/4 RAC)	Major Guy Knecht	HM2 105 mm howitzer (x12)	Dominique
3rd Group/10th Colonial Artillery Regiment (III/10 RAC)	Major Alliou	HM2 105 mm howitzer (x12)	Isabelle; Claudine
11th Battery/4th Group/4th Colonial Artillery Regiment (11/IV/4 RAC)	Capitaine Déal	HM1 155 mm howitzer (x4)	Claudine
Platoon/1st Colonial Far East Anti-Aircraft Artillery Group (I GAACEO)	Lieutenant Paul Redon	Quad-50 M2 0.50cal MG (x4)	Epervier
1st Foreign Composite Heavy Mortar Company (1 CMMLE)	Lieutenant René Colcy	120 mm mortar (x8)	Claudine
2nd Foreign Composite Heavy Mortar Company (2 CMMLE)	Lieutenant Fetter	120 mm mortar (x8)	Gabrielle; Anne-Marie
1st Foreign Parachute Heavy Mortar Company (1 CEPML)	Lieutenant Paul Turcy	120 mm mortar (x12)	Claudine; Dominique

=== Engineers ===
Unit	Commander
31st Engineer Battalion (31 BG)	Major André Sudrat/Major Maurice Durieux

=== Service Units ===
Unit	Commander
2nd Company/822nd Signals Battalion (2/822 BT)	–
2nd Company/823rd Signals Battalion (2/823 BT)	–
342nd Parachute Signals Company (342 CPT)	–
2nd Platoon/5th Foreign Legion Medium Repair Company (2/5 CRMLE)	Lieutenant Bugeat
3rd Ammunition Resupply Company (detachment) (3 CM)	Sous Lieutenant Léonard
730th Fuel Resupply Company (detachment) (730 CR)	–
712th Traffic Company (712 CCR)	–
3rd General Staff Transport Company (3 CTQG)	–
1st Exploitation Group (Quartermaster Corps) (GEO 1)	–
3rd Marching Battalion/Republican Guard Mobile Gendarmerie (detachment) (3 LM/GRGM)	–
403rd Military Post Office (403 BPM)	–

=== Medical Service Units ===
Unit	Commander
29th Mobile Surgical Team (ACM 29)	Major Paul Grauwin
44th Mobile Surgical Team (ACM 44)	Lieutenant Jacques Gindrey
3rd Parachute Surgical Team (ACP 3)	Lieutenant Louis Résillot
5th Parachute Surgical Team (ACP 5)	Capitaine Ernest Hantz
6th Parachute Surgical Team (ACP 6)	Lieutenant Jean Vidal

=== Intelligence ===
Unit	Commander
8th Commando Group/Mixed Intervention Group (GC 8/GMI)	Capitaine Hébert
Operations-Patrols Detachment (DOP)	–

=== Air Force ===
Unit	Commander	Aircraft
Airfield Control Post 'Torri Rouge' (PCIA)	Major Jacques Guérin	
Fighter Squadron 1/22 'Saintonge'	Capitaine Claude Payen	F8F-1 Bearcat (x6)
21st Artillery Air Observation Squadron (GAOA 21)	Lieutenant Asselineau	MS-500 Criquet
1st Light Medical Evacuation Company (1 CLES)	–	Sikorsky H-19 S-55
21/374th Air Force Signals Company (CT 21/374)	–	
195th Air Base Detachment (DB 195)	–	
Air Force Marching Company	Capitaine Jean Charnod	

== Air Units Support ==
=== Air Force ===
Unit	Aircraft	Base
Fighter Squadron 2/22 'Languedoc'	F8F-1 Bearcat	Haiphong (Cat Bi)
Bomber Squadron 1/19 'Gascogne'	B-26 Invader	Haiphong (Cat Bi)
Bomber Squadron 1/25 'Tunisie'	B-26 Invader	Haiphong (Cat Bi)
Transport Squadron 2/62 'Franche-Comté'	Dakota DC-3	Hanoi (Bach Mai Airfield)
Transport Squadron 2/63 'Sénégal'	Dakota DC-3	Hanoi (Gia Lam)
Transport Squadron 1/64 'Béarn'	Dakota DC-3	Hanoi (Gia Lam)
Transport Squadron 2/64 'Anjou'	Dakota DC-3	Hanoi (Bach Mai)
23rd Artillery Air Observation Squadron (GAOA 23)	MS-500 Criquet	Muong Sai
80th Overseas Reconnaissance Squadron (EROM 80)	RF-8F Bearcat (reco); B-26C Invader (reco)	Hanoi (Bach Mai)
52nd Air Liaison Squadron (ELA 52)	Sikorsky H-19 S-55	Biên Hòa
53rd Air Liaison Squadron (ELA 53)	Sikorsky H-19 S-55	Hanoi (Gia Lam)

=== Naval Air Arm ===
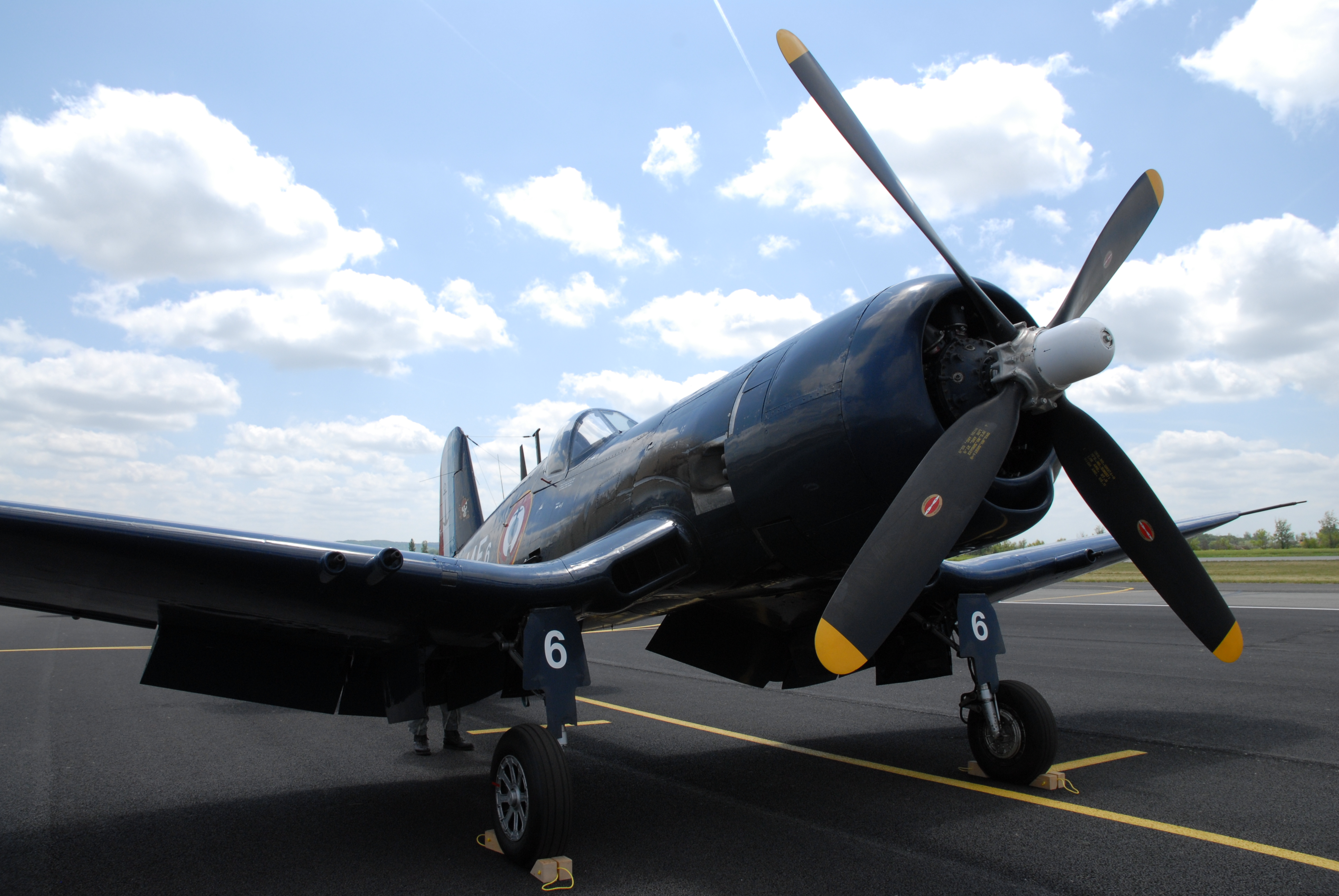
A US-built F4U-7 Corsair of the 14.F flotilla at Airexpo 2007.

Unit	Aircraft	Base
3rd Carrier Attack Squadron (3F)	SB2C-5 Helldiver	Carrier Arromanches (Tourane); Hanoi (Bach Mai)
11th Carrier Fighter Squadron (11F)	F6F-5 Hellcat	Carrier Arromanches (Tourane); Hai Phong (Cat Bi)
14th Carrier Fighter Squadron (14F)	F4U-7 Corsair; AU-1 Corsair	Carrier Bois Belleau (Halong Bay); Hanoi (Bach Mai)
28th Bomber Squadron (28F)	PB4Y Privateer	Hai Phong (Cat Bi)

=== U.S. Central Intelligence Agency ===
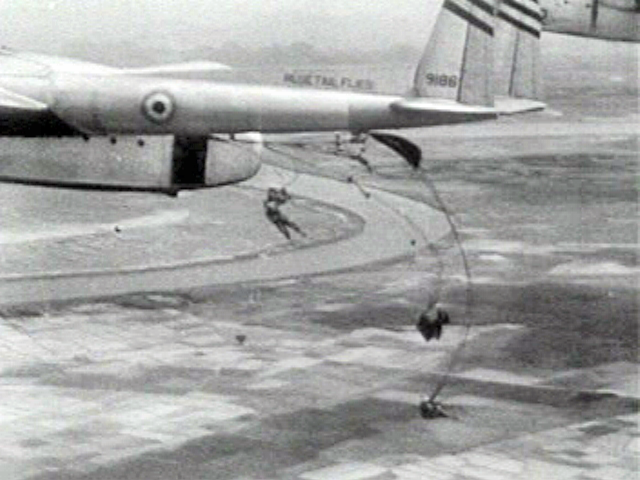
France-marked USAF CAT-flown C-119 over Dien Ben Phu.

Unit	Aircraft	Base	Pilots
Civil Air Transport (CAT)	Dakota DC-3; C-119 Flying Boxcar	Hai Phong (Cat Bi)	37

== Việt Minh ==
=== Command ===
	Commander	Position
Vietnam People's Army (VPA)	General Võ Nguyên Giáp	Muong Phang

=== Infantry ===
Unit	Commander	Notes
Division 304 (less); Title: Vinh Quang (Glory); Codename: 'Nam Định'	Commissar Le Chuong; Chief of Staff: Nam Long	
Infantry regiment 9	Tran Thanh Tu	Infantry battalions 353, 375, 400
Infantry regiment 57	Nguyen Can	Infantry battalions 265, 346, 418
Division 308; Title: Quan Tien Phong (Vanguard); Codename: 'Việt Bắc'	Colonel Vuong Thua Vu; Commissar Song Hao	
Infantry regiment 36; Title: Bac Bac; Alias: Sa Pa	Pham Hong Son	Infantry battalions 80, 84, 89
Infantry regiment 88; Title: Tu Vu; Alias: Tam Dao	Nam Ha	Infantry battalions 22, 29, 322
Infantry regiment 102; Title: Thu Do (Capital); Alias: Ba Vi	Nguyen Hung Sinh	Infantry battalions 18, 59, 79
Division 312; Title: Chien Thang (Victory); Codename: 'Bến Tre'	Colonel Lê Trọng Tấn; Commissar Tran Do	
Infantry regiment 141; Title: Ba Vi	Quang Tuyen	Infantry battalions 11, 16, 428
Infantry regiment 165; Title: Lao Ha Yen, Thanh Dong Bien Gioi; Alias: Dong Trieu	Le Thuy	Infantry battalions 115, 542, 564
Infantry regiment 209; Title: Song Lo	Hoang Cam	Infantry battalions 130, 154, 166
Division 316; Alias: Biên Hòa	Colonel Le Quang Ba; Commissar Chu Huy Man	
Infantry regiment 98	Vu Lang	Infantry battalions 215, 439, 938
Infantry regiment 174; Title: Cao Bac Lang; Alias: Sóc Trăng	Nguyễn Hữu An	Infantry battalions 249, 251, 255
Infantry regiment 176		Infantry battalions 888, 910, 999

=== Artillery ===
Unit	Commander	Notes
Artillery-Engineer Division 351; Alias:Long Chau	Dao Van Truong; Commissar Pham Ngoc Mau	
Artillery Regiment 45; Title:Tat Thang (Inevitable Victory)	Nguyen Huu My	24 M101 105mm howitzers 632nd artillery battalion (12 M101 105mm howitzers); 954th artillery battalion (12 M101 105mm howitzers)
Artillery Regiment 675; Title:Anh Dung (Valiant)	Doan Tue	20 Type-41 75mm mountain guns 16 M1938 120mm mortars 175th mountain gun battalion 275th mountain gun battalion 83rd mortar battalion
AAA Regiment 367 (less)	Le Van Tri	2 AAA battalions (12 M1939 37mm AA guns each)
Heavy Weapon Regiment 237		Mortar battalion 413(54 M-37 82mm mortars); H6 rocket battalion (12 Chinese six-barrel 75 mm H6 rocket launchers); 75 mm recoilless gun battalion
Engineer Regiment 151	Pham Hoang	
