= Gabriel Bablon =

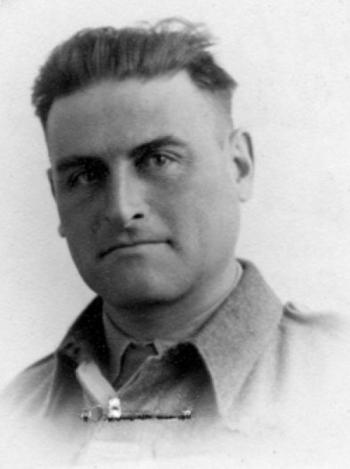
- Gabriel Bablon
- Born: 1 September 1905; Domfront, Orne, France
- Died: 27 March 1956 (aged 50) France
- Allegiance: République Française; Free French Forces
- Branch: French Foreign Legion
- Service years: 1923–1954
- Rank: Colonel - Légion étrangère
- Commands: 13th Demi-Brigade of the Foreign Legion 13^{e} DBLE; 24th Infantry Regiment
- Conflicts: World War II; Indochina War
- Awards: Commandeur de la Légion d'honneur Compagnon de la Libération; Croix de Guerre 1939-1945; Croix de guerre des théâtres d'opérations extérieures U.S. Distinguished Service Cross

Gabriel Bablon (1 September 1905 - 27 March 1956) was a French army officer and Compagnon de la Libération. A Legion Officer seconded from the ranks, who had already accumulated more than fifteen years of service, when the Second World War began, he refused defeat and continued fighting in the ranks of the Free French Forces. Engaged in the Western Desert Campaign, he illustrated capability during the Battle of Bir Hakeim and the Second Battle of El Alamein. Later he participated to the Italian campaign and the Liberation of France. Pursuing later his military career after the war, he served in Indochina and in Germany before retiring.

== Prior to the war ==
Gabriel Bablon was the son of a French infantry division général. He enlisted at the age of eighteen, was sent to Germany, occupied by France (French: occupée par la France), in the ranks of the 17th Algerian Tirailleurs Regiment (French: 17^{e} Régiment de Tirailleurs Algériens). Promoted to Sergent in 1924, he went to Morocco where he was wounded in the knee by a bullet in 1925. Selected to become an officer from the ranks, he integrated the officer active student course at Saint-Cyr in 1926. He became a Sous-Lieutenant in 1928, then at his sortie from the school in 1929, was assigned to the 30th Chasseur Battalion à Pied (French: 30^{e} Bataillon de Chasseurs à Pied). In 1932, with the rank of lieutenant, he interacted for a first time with the French Foreign Legion, while being assigned to the 1st Foreign Regiment, then in 1933 to the 4th Foreign Regiment.

== Second World War ==
During the Battle of France, Gabriel Bablon remained stationed in Morocco and did not engaged in any combats. Choosing to pursue combats, he decided to rally to Free France when he was placed in armistice vacation in December 1940. The next month, he was able to join London via Gibraltar and joined the Free French Forces. He was immediately assigned to the 13th Demi-Brigade of the Foreign Legion 13^{e} DBLE in Lebanon. Moved to North Africa with his unit in 1942, he illustrated combat capabilities during the Western Desert Campaign (French: guerre du desert) and was wounded a first time by the blast of a shell in January, then by a mine in June during the Battle of Bir Hakeim (French: bataille de Bir Hakeim). Heading the second battalion after having been promoted to Chef de bataillon, he distinguished again capability during the Second Battle of El Alamein (French: seconde bataille d'El Alamein). On 23 October colonel Dimitri Amilakvari, regimental commander of the 13^{e} DBLE, was killed and Gabriel Gabon replaced him at the head of the unit. He led the latter during the campaigns of Tunisia (French: Tunisie) and Italy (French: Italie). On 17 May 1944, at San Giorgio a Liri, he was wounded again by the blast of a grenade. Disembarked on 31 August 1944 in the disembarking of Provence (French: débarquement de Provence), he participated to the Liberation of France (French: libération de la France). In September, with the rank of lieutenant-colonel, he headed the 24th Infantry Regiment (French: 24^{e} Régiment d'Infanterie) at the corps of the 10th Infantry Division (French: 10^{e} Division d'Infanterie) commanded by général Pierre Billotte (French: Pierre Billotte).

== After-war ==
In December 1945, he reassumed the command of the 13th Demi-Brigade of the Foreign Legion 13^{e} DBLE and directed the latter during the Indochina War starting 1946. In April 1948, the 4th Demi-Brigade of the Foreign Legion, formed from elements of the former elements of the 4th Foreign Regiment was dissolved in 1940, and reassumed the designation of 4^{e} RE. Gabriel Bablon headed the contingent. He was then assigned to Germany and then took his retirement in 1954 after having been promoted to colonel one year prior. Attained by severe health challenges, he succumbed and died on 27 March 1956.

== Decorations ==

Commandeur de la Légion d'Honneur	Compagnon de la Libération decree of 28 May 1945	Croix de Guerre 1939-1945 (2 citations)
Croix de guerre des Théâtres d'opérations extérieurs	Médaille coloniale Agrafes "Sahara", "Maroc", "Syrie", "Bir-Hakeim", "Libye" et "Extrême-Orient"	Médaille des services militaires volontaires
Medalla de la Paz de Marruecos (Espagne)	Commandeur de l'Ordre du Ouissam alaouite	Commandeur de l'Ordre du Nichan Iftikhar
Distinguished Service Cross (États-Unis)

== See also ==
- Ordre de la Libération
