= Operational Group of the Foreign Legion =

- Active: August 1, 1971 - August 1, 1977
- Country: France
- Branch: French Army
- Type: Specialized Infantry
- Part of: Foreign Legion Groupment
- Garrison/HQ: Bonifacio, Corsica
- Motto(s): Honneur et Fidélité
- Colors: Green and Red

Commanders
- Notable commanders: colonel Marcel Letestu

The Operation Group of the Foreign Legion (French: Groupement opérationnel de la Légion étrangère (G.O.L.E)) was a unit of the Foreign Legion with an operational vocation.

Created on August 1, 1971 from elements of the 1st Foreign Regiment, themselves regrouped at the corps of the Foreign Legion Groupment (G.L.E), which included the attachment of the Instruction Group of the Foreign Legion (French: Groupement d'instruction de la Légion étrangère (G.I.L.E)) at the 2nd Foreign Regiment 2^{e} RE, recreated on September 1, 1972.

In 1976, while the Instruction Group of the Foreign Legion departed to the 4th Foreign Regiment 4^{e}RE of Castelnaudary and while being integrated within the 1st Foreign Regiment 1^{er} RE; the 2nd Foreign Regiment 2^{e} RE took charge of regimental operations.

The operational group was stationed in Bonifacio, Corsica until 1977, the year of dissolution of the (G.O.L.E) to become a main composing elements of the 2nd Foreign Regiment 2^{e} RE, designated originally back in 1980: the 2nd Foreign Infantry Regiment 2^{e} REI.

== History of the garrisons, campaigns and battles ==
The G.O.L.E was engaged from 1978 to 1979 in Tchad, where the 7th company endured two 2 killed and 5 wounded in combat.

The G.O.L.E was engaged in 1976 in the French Territory of the Afars and the Issas in a counter-terrorist children rescue mission in 1976 in the LOYADA affair where the 6th company deplored 6 killed in a helicopter crash.

== Organization ==
At creation, the G.O.L.E regrouped 3 combat companies, reinforced in operations by the 4th squadron of the 1st Foreign Cavalry Regiment 1^{e} REC. Initially, the G.O.L.E consisted of the 5th, 6th combat company as well a support combat company (French: Compagnie d'Appui et de Soutien (C.A.S)). However, the 5th and 6th combat companies didn't exist in 1971, the 5th was the C.M.L.E and the 6th combat company was the 3rd combat company commanded by Captain Braun. The G.O.L.E was created in 1971 and commanded by colonel Letestu. Later in 1975, the 7th combat company of the G.O.L.E would be created in Comoros, Mayotte and would rejoin Bonifacio.

== Chef de Corps ==
- Général d'armées Michel Guignon

== See also ==
- Major (France)
- 2nd Foreign Parachute Regiment
- 31st Brigade
