= Gabriel Brunet de Sairigné =

French Army officer (1913–1948)

- Born: 9 February 1913; Paris, France
- Died: 1 March 1948 (aged 35); Lagnia Bien Hoa, Vietnam
- Military career
- Allegiance: France
- Branch: French Army
- Service years: 1933 – † 1948
- Rank: Colonel
- Commands: 13th Foreign Legion Demi-Brigade
- Conflicts: World War II; First Indochina War
- Awards: Commander of the Legion of Honor; Compagnon de la Libération

Gabriel Brunet de Sairigné (9 February 1913 – 1 March 1948) was a French Army officer of the French Foreign Legion. He was born in Paris, and was killed in the line of duty close to Lagnia Bien Hoa (Vietnam).

== Education ==
He went to the Lycée Pasteur and the Lycée Saint-Louis in Paris before joining the famous École Spéciale Militaire de Saint-Cyr in 1933.

== World War II ==
During World War II, he participated with the Free French Forces in:

- 1941 : the East African Campaign (in Eritrea and Ethiopia) and the Syria-Lebanon Campaign)
- 1942 : the Battle of Bir Hakeim, then the Tunisia Campaign
- 1943 : the Allied invasion of Sicily
- 1944 : the Operation Dragoon.
- 1944 : the campaign of Alsace.

He finished the war with the rank of lieutenant colonel, commandant in chief of the First French Free Division (in French: "Première division française libre", or "1ère DFL").

His personal notes dealing with his campaigns during World War II (exactly from 28 February 1940 to 18 June 1945) were published after his death.

== First Indochina War ==
He was a colonel during the First Indochina War serving with the French Foreign Legion and became the commanding officer of the 13th Foreign Legion Demi-Brigade between 21 August 1946 and his death in the line of duty on 1 March 1948.

== Honour ==
- Commander of the Légion d'honneur
- Compagnon de la Libération (9 September 1942)
- Croix de guerre 1939-1945 (7 citations)
- Croix de guerre des Théatres d'Opérations Extérieures (4 citations)
- Colonial medals with "Tunisia 1942-1943" and "EO" clasps
- Commemorative medal of the 1939-1945 war, with "Norway", "Africa", "France", campaign in Indochina clasps

== Books ==
- Les Carnets du Lieutenant-colonel Brunet de Sérigné, by André-Paul Comor, collection Nouvelles Éditions Latines, Paris, 1990.
- L'épopée de la 13e demi-brigade de Légion étrangère, 1940-1945, by André-Paul Comor, collection Nouvelles Éditions Latines, Paris, 1988.
