= 13th Demi-Brigade of the Foreign Legion =

French military unit

13th Half-Brigade of the Foreign Legion
- 13^{e} Demi-Brigade de Légion étrangère
- Regimental Insignia of the 13th Demi-Brigade of the Foreign Legion
- Active: 1940 – present: 13th Mountain Demi-Brigade 13^{e} DBMLE; 14th Marching Demi Brigade 14^{e} DBMLE; 13th Demi-Brigade 13^{e} DBLE
- Country: France
- Branch: Armée de Terre (French Land Army) Foreign Legion
- Type: Light Infantry
- Role: Security Assistance; Desert/Jungle Warfare; Counter-Insurgency; Reconnaissance; Urban warfare
- Size: ~1300 men
- Part of: 6th Light Armoured Brigade; 6^{e} BLB; 3rd Division
- Garrison/HQ: La Cavalerie, France
- Nicknames: The Demi Brigade (English); Phalange Magnifique (Magnificent Phalanx)
- Mottos: More Majorum à la manière de nos Anciens (fr) (in the manner, ways and traditions of our veterans foreign regiments)
- March: Nos képis blancs (Sous le soleil brulant d'Afrique)
- Anniversaries: Camerone Day (30 April) and Christmas
- Engagements: World War II: Battles of Narvik; Battle of Dakar; Battle of Gabon; Battle of Keren; Syria-Lebanon Campaign; Battle of Bir Hakeim; Second Battle of El Alamein; Tunisia Campaign; Italian Campaign; Operation Dragoon; Bataille des Vosges; Colmar Pocket; Western Allied invasion of Germany; First Indochina War: Battle of Hòa Bình; Battle of Dien Bien Phu; Algerian War: Operation Jumelles; Global war on terrorism (2001–present)

Commanders
- Current commander: Colonel Thomas Riou
- Notable commanders: Raoul Magrin-Vernerey; Dimitri Amilakvari; Gabriel Brunet de Sairigné; Jules Gaucher; Bernard Saint-Hillier

Insignia
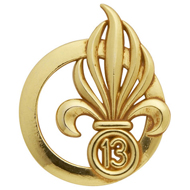
- Beret insignia of the 13 Demi Brigade
- Abbreviation: 13^{e} DBLE

The 13th Demi-Brigade of Foreign Legion (French: 13^{e} Demi-Brigade de Légion étrangère, 13^{e} DBLE), was created in 1940 and was the main unit of the 1st Free French Division, Free French Forces (FFL). From the coast of Norway to Bir Hakeim, to Africa then the Alsace, while passing by Syria and Italy, the 13th Demi-Brigade would be part of most of the major campaigns of the French Army during the Second World War.

After having been engaged in Indochina from 1946 to 1954, the 13^{e} DBLE joined the Algerian War, and left in 1962. The 13^{e} DBLE was based until 2011 at Quartier-Général Monclar in Djibouti, in virtue of an accord between France and the Republic of Djibouti in 1977. During 2011, the unit moved to the United Arab Emirates. In 2016, the unit returned to France, based at the same camp where it was first formed (and took its designation on 27 March 1940) – Camp du Larzac.

== Creation and different designations ==
This unit of the Legion was created on 1 March 1940 within the cadre of the Franco-British expeditionary corps intended to intervene in Finland. The first designation of this unit was 13th Mountain Demi-Brigade of the Foreign Legion (13^{e} DBMLE).

In lieu of the kepi, The formation was issued the 1935 pattern Fortress troops khaki beret with the Foreign Legion grenade hat badge.

On 1 July 1940, the 1st battalion, 900 men, were based in England as troops of the Free French Forces, the 14^{e} DBMLE, while the remainder of the demi-brigade, 800 men principally from the 2nd battalion, returned to Morocco and preserved the designation of 13^{e} DBMLE.

On 4 November 1940, the demi-brigade of Morocco was dissolved which allowed the troops which remained in England to readopt the designation of 13^{e} DBLE.

== History of campaigns, battles and garrisons ==
=== Second World War ===
The unit was constituted in North Africa from volunteers of other foreign units stationed there. The unit was then commanded by lieutenant-colonel Raoul Magrin-Vernerey and was initially composed of two battalions:

- The 1^{er} bataillon – Chef de bataillon (CBA) Guéninchault – Sidi bel-Abbès
- The 2^{e} bataillon – Chef de bataillon (CBA) Boyer Ressès – Fez

Starting 13 May 1940, the unit took part in the Norwegian Campaign in the corps commanded by Général Béthouart, fighting in Bjerkvik and Narvik. The operation was a success, however, with the invasion of France, the unit was obliged to repatriate to the national territory. Losses in Norway were 8 Officers, and 93 Legionnaires including Chef de Bataillon Guéninchault.

The unit disembarked in Brittany on 4 June to reinforce the proposed national redoubt (French: réduit Breton). On 21 June, the survivors of the demi-brigade embarked for Scotland. Those troops which did not heed the Appeal of 18 June (French: appel du 18) joined other units of the French Scandinavian Expeditionary Corps (French: Corps expéditionnaire français en Scandinavie) in the region of Trentham.

Adhering to this appeal, recently promoted captain Pierre Kœnig adjoint (assistant) of lieutenant-colonel Raoul Magrin-Vernerey, convinced the latter to head to London, where they met Général De Gaulle. Magrin-Vernerey met with Général Antoine Béthouart, chief 1st Chasseurs Division of the French Scandinavian Expeditionary Corps (French: Corps expéditionnaire français en Scandinavie), who allowed him to meet the men at the garrisoned camp on the night of 30 June. Out of the 1,619 Legionnaires present on 28 June 1940, a little less than 900 rallied to Free France (French: France libre), the others joined Morocco under the command of Général Béthouard. Joining later the camp, where were regrouped the garrisoned Free French Forces, the 13^{e} DBLE participated to the 14 July parade in London.

The units of the Free French Forces took temporarily, between 1 July 1940 and 2 November 1940, the designation of 14th Demi-Brigade of the Foreign Legion 14^{e} DBLE, while composed of the following:

- Headquarters staff commanded by commandant Alfred Maurice Cazaud (French: Alfred Maurice Cazaud)
- 3 combat units
- 1 support unit

The demi-brigade had a strength of 25 officers, 102 NCOs and 702 other ranks.

At the end of September 1940, the unit participated in the Battle of Dakar against Dakar. Following the failure of the landing in Senegal, the unit finished by disembarking, under the command of lieutenant-colonel Cazaud, in Equatorial French Africa (French: Afrique-Équatoriale française) to partake, in November 1940, to the Battle of Gabon (French: campagne du Gabon) and the rallying of Gabon to Free France (French: France libre), under the command of général de Larminat.

The unit accordingly assumed its original denomination, and at the corps of the French Orient Brigade, the unit circled Africa and disembarked at Port Soudan on 12 February 1941 to take part in combats in the East African Campaign. The brigade accordingly distinguished itself during the Battle of Keren, on 27 March 1941, then Massaoua on 8 April 1941.

In the following month, the unit joined Palestine in order to participate to the Syria–Lebanon Campaign. The demi-brigade entered into Syria on 8 June and following harsh combats, managed to enter into Damascus on 21 June. On 6 September 1941, lieutenant-colonel prince Amilakvari assumed command of the unit. In December, the 2nd battalion (commandant René Babonneau (French: René Babonneau)) and 3rd battalion made way to North Africa where the unit, at the corps of the Koenig Brigade, front faced the forces of the Afrika Korps.

Promoted to chef de bataillon in September 1941, excellent instructor of men, René Babonneau assumed command of the 2nd Battalion, which at Bir Hakeim, on 27 May 1942, held back more than 70 tanks of the division Ariete, by destroying 35 out of them. His battalion received a citation at the orders of the armed forces. Remaining at the rear to uphold the unfolding, on the night of 10–11 June 1942 he was made prisoner and transferred to Italy, where he twice attempted to escape.

From May to June 1942, a part of the unit was successful at Bir Hakeim. This would be the occasion for Pierre Messmer, captain commanding a company to write later, a book: The Lost Patrol (French: La patrouille perdue). Then the "13^{e}" took part to the Second Battle of El Alamein, during which the commanding officer of the unit - Dimitri Amilakhvari - was killed.

During the assembly of the 1st Free French Division (1^{re} DFL), beginning of 1943, the DBLE disappeared as far as a troop corps and the three constituting units (1^{er} BLE, 2^{e} BLE and the anti-tank company) were incorporated into the 1st Brigade of the Division.

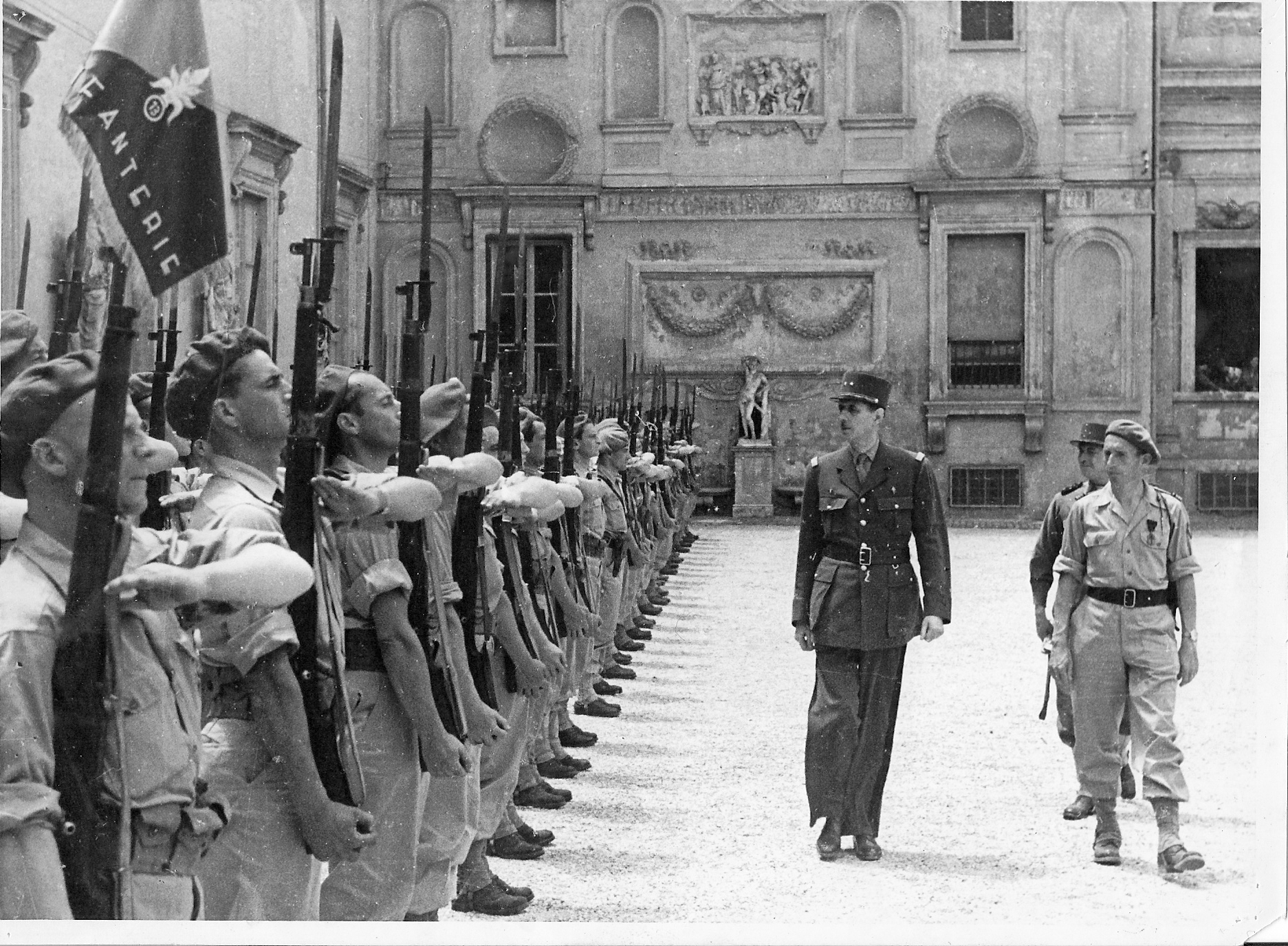
Charles de Gaulle inspecting the 13th Demi-Brigade in Rome, Italy, 28 June 1944

The unit later engaged in combat at the corps of the French Expeditionary Corps then disembarked in Provence within the cadre of Operation Dragoon in mid-August 1944. The demi-brigade took part in the Liberation of France (French: libération de la France) as part of the 1st Free French Division (1st Army) (French: 1^{re} Armée française), notably during the course of the Battle of the Vosges (French: Bataille des Vosges).

During late 1944, a nominally Ukrainian battalion of the FFI – composed of recent defectors from the 30th Waffen SS Grenadier Division — was attached to the 13th Demi-Brigade. Two groups from the SS division had defected to the FFI on 27 August. One included 818 Ukrainians based at Vesoul, under the direction of Major Lev (Leon) Hloba, who had shot their German officers and surrendered to the Haute-Saône arm of the FFI in the Confracourt Woods. They brought with them 45-mm antitank guns, 82-mm and 50-mm mortars, 21 heavy machine guns, as well as large amounts of small arms and small-caliber ammunition. That same day, a similar defection occurred near Camp Valdahon – hundreds of men brought with them an antitank gun, eight heavy machine guns, four mortars, and small arms and ammunition. The defectors became known as the Bataillon de Résistants Ukrainiens.

On 6 April 1945, the unit was seen attributed the Ordre de la Libération.

=== Indochina War ===
Destined to be part of the French Expeditionary in Extreme-Orient, the 13^{e}DBLE disembarked of the SS Ormonde on 6 February 1946 at Saigon and garrisoned north of the town, in the triangle of Gia Định -Thu Duc – Hoc Mon.

Operations commenced, with 19 June 1946, the first combat at Mat Cat (Cochinchine). The 13^{e} DBLE was engaged in the frontiers of Siam until Tourane, while passing by the fields of Joncs. The battalions were spread.

- The 1st Battalion at Cambodia, pursued the Khmers issarak, which refuged in Siam.
- The 2nd Battalion at the center of Annam, defended Tourane, emptied Hué and installed a series of posts around Quảng Nam.
- The 3rd Battalion confronted hard combat at Cochinchine, where local ambushes alternated with action forces.

The 13^{e} DBLE participated to operations "Vega", "Dragon II et III", "Geneviève", "Jonquille", and "Canigou", with the adversary often leaving combatants behind, such as at Largauze on 26 March 1949. In 1950 the 13^{e} DBLE assembled in Cochinchine and received in support a fourth battalion. The latter was destined to join the units that had the mission to clean up the fields of Joncs.

The rhythm of operations accelerated with the beginning of the dry season: "Potager", "Normandie", "Ramadan", "Trois Provinces", "Tulipes", "Ulysse 3", "Neptune", and "Revanche". Following this operation, the 13^{e} DBLE was again split. Three battalions remained in Cochinchine where they participated to different operations: "Araba", "Mandarine", "Pamplemousse", and "Caïman".

On 31 January 1953, the 4th battalion was dissolved and the 3rd battalion transformed into an itinerary battalion: the latter would be found in Tonkin, then at Hué, Na Sam, Xoang Xa, at Than Hoa, engaged in a series of hard combats.

==== Combat engagements ====
- The 13^{e} DBLE was attacked at Cà Mau by 700 combatants on 13 June 1947.
- At Cau Xang, nine legionnaires defended the guard tower, until their death.
- On 23 August 1947, the intervention company of the 3rd battalion was surprised with a larger superior number enemy. The legionnaires formed the Infantry square and repelled all the assaults while singing « Le Boudin » (French: Le Boudin). When the rescue column arrived, the post deplored one killed and four wounded; however, the enemy retreated with three full chariots.
- On 1 March 1948, a free escorted civilian convoy passed by Saigon to Dalat and fell in an ambush. Lieutenant-colonel de Sairigné, regimental commander of the 13^{e} DBLE was part of the first killed. The adversaries took 134 civilians to serve them as shields. The pursuit led to the recuperation of a part of the innocent hostages which the enemy was constrained to abandon.

==== Hòa Bình 1952 ====
The 13^{e} DBLE participated in the Battle of Hòa Bình from 14 November 1951 to 24 February 1952. Hòa Bình (the name means "peace" in Vietnamese) was the capital of the Muong ethnic minority. By road, Hòa Bình lay a mere 67 kilometers of map distance from Hanoi via Colonial Route 6 (Fr: Route Coloniale 6). The Việt Minh had controlled Hòa Bình since October 1950 and used the district as a logistics staging area for operations in north central Vietnam. The French commander in Indochina, General Jean de Lattre de Tassigny, ordered the retaking of Hòa Bình in late 1951.

The 2nd Battalion of 13^{e} DBLE fought in a key engagement at Xóm-Pheo from 8–9 January 1952. The legionnaires held a vital hill at Xóm-Pheo astride Colonial Route 6, and they fortified their positions with trenches, bunkers, barbed wire, and minefields. On the night of 8 January, troops from the Việt Minh 102nd Infantry Regiment infiltrated through the minefields and attacked the 2/13^{e} DBLE positions. The Việt Minh forces overran the 5th Company position and destroyed bunkers with TNT satchel charges and Bangalore torpedoes. With many of their officers and NCOs killed or wounded, and half of their position overrun, the legionnaires counterattacked with fixed bayonets and hand grenades.

The legionnaires later counted 700 Việt Minh dead around the position at Xon-Pheó.

==== Dien Bien Phu 1953–1954 ====
End of 1953, the 13^{e} DBLE assembled at Tonkin, the 2nd battalion in the Delta, the 1st and 3rd battalion (French: les 1^{er} et 3^{e} bataillon) where at the Battle of Dien Bien Phu, where they respectively held « Claudine » and « Béatrice ». On the night of 13 March 1954, after five assaults, « Béatrice » was submerged. The 3rd battalion was annihilated with Lieutenant-colonel Jules Gaucher, the regimental commander. The survivors barely represented the numbers of an actual company, and in the rear, efforts were made to reconstitute the battalion, however, time seemed to be missing. on 7 May, all was finished. The camp of Dien Bien Phu was submerged and 1st battalion disappeared to the turn. The Fanions of these units were destroyed at the last minute. Only a couple of fragments of the 2nd company were able to be brought back to Sidi bel-Abbès by a couple of legionnaires, whom share it before falling in the hands of the enemy.

Lieutenant-colonel Gaucher was killed on the first day of the battle (13 March 1954), when his command post suffered a direct hit from Việt Minh artillery. Suffering from serious wounds – the loss of both arms, severe injuries to both legs, and an open chest wound – he died at the hospital. Gaucher was replaced as 13^{e} DBLE commander on 23 March by Lieutenant-colonel Lemeunier who was helicoptered into the fortress. Until the end of the battle, Lemeunier would be the most senior Foreign Legion officer present at Dien Bien Phu.

The unit suffered heavy casualties during fighting in March and April. On 14 April the Dien Bien Phu garrison reported that I/13^{e} DBLE was reduced to 354 effectives and III/13^{e} DBLE was reduced to 80 effectives.

On 30 April, the legionnaires at Dien Bien Phu celebrated the anniversary of the Legion's historic Battle of Camarón (French: Bataille de Camerone). The celebration took place at the 13^{e} DBLE command post where Lieutenant-colonel Lemeunier read the traditional Camarón proclamation over a radio hook-up that could be heard throughout Dien Bien Phu.

The 13^{e} DBLE was the only French unit present at Dien Bien Phu that saved one of its battle flags from destruction or capture. The guidon of 4th Company, III/13^{e} DBLE was initially captured by the Việt Minh during the assault on "Béatrice" on 13 March. On 19 May, while the Việt Minh were celebrating Ho Chi Minh's birthday, Sergeant Beres, a Hungarian legionnaire serving with 1st Foreign Parachute Battalion (1^{er} B.E.P), crawled into a Việt Minh command post and rescued the flag. The seriously wounded Beres was evacuated by helicopter from Dien Bien Phu on 24 May with the guidon hidden under his clothes.

During its 9-year service in Indochina (1946–1955), the 13^{e} DBLE suffered 2,721 killed in action (2334 Legionnaires, 307 Warrant Officers, 80 Officers). This included two commanding officers – Lieutenant-colonel Brunet de Sairigné and Lieutenant-colonel Gaucher.

=== Algeria War ===
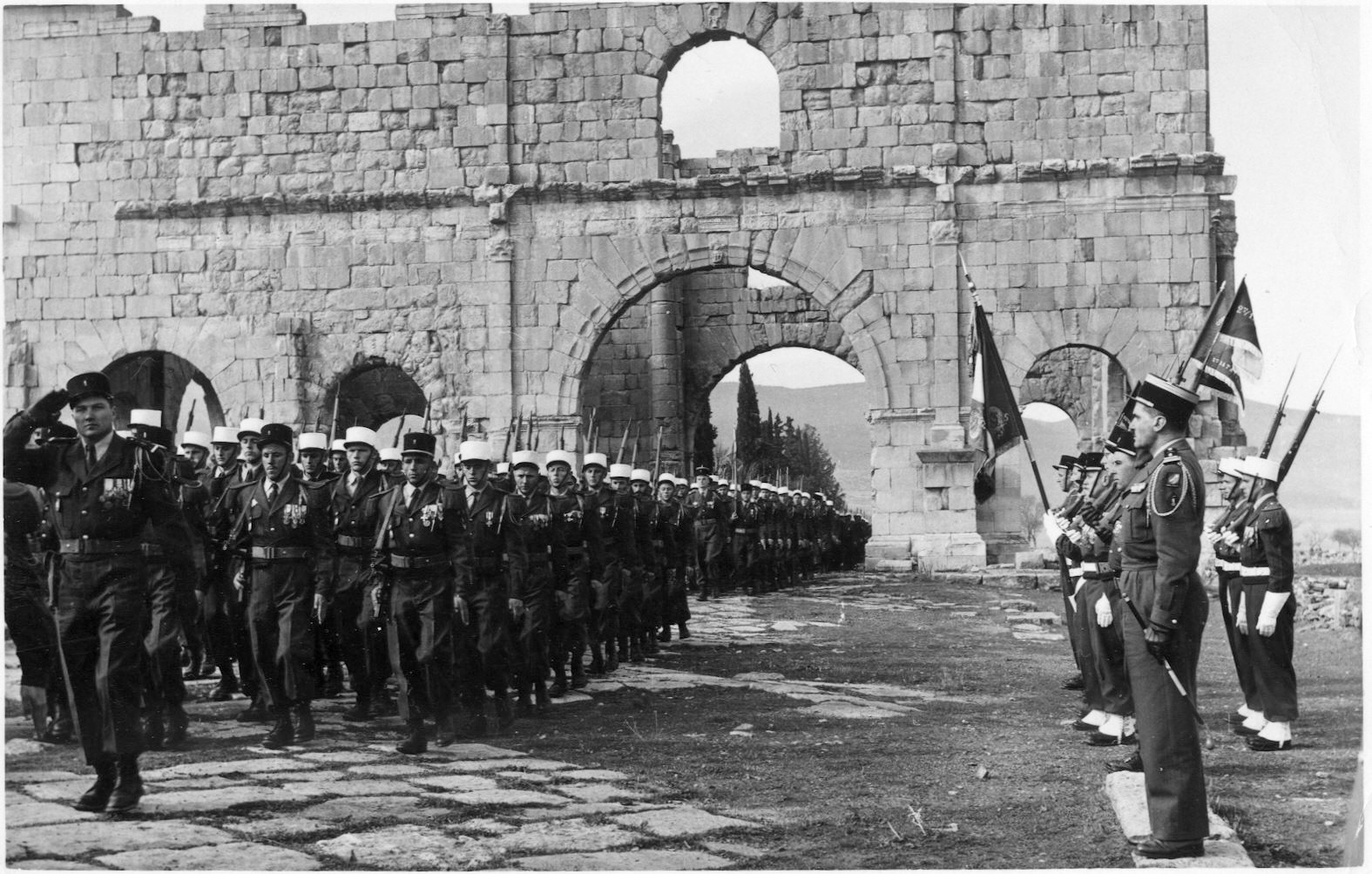
The 13^{e} DBLE marches through the Roman ruins at Lambaesis, in 1958 in a ceremonial revue. The Legionnaires with MAS 36, Officers and Sous-Officiers with submachine guns MAT-49. Holstered arms were probably MAC Mle 1950. Garde du Drapeau and Fanions at attention.

In 1955, the 13^{e} DBLE was found back on the African continent. Engaged in the operations of maintaining order (French: opérations de maintien de l'ordre en Algérie), the regiment disembarked in Tunisia on 28 June 1955. Based in Guelma, the regiment radiated in Constantinois, North and South in the Nemencha. Hiding places were found but no combatants. Accordingly, the phase of "pacification" commenced.

The 13^{e} DBLE constructed or restored posts: Khsirane. The fight followed in the djebels, marked by hard combats: Zaouia, Bou Zakadane, Ouindj, djebel Seike. In July 1957, a combatant group of the ALN was destroyed.

Leaving then Nemenchta, the 13^{e} DBLE reduced to two battalions garrisoned at Aurès. Steep peaks were succeeded by wooded massifs. At the beginning of 1958, three combats against the ALN, obliged the latter to refuse to get in contact, and accordingly reacted by taking up violence on the civilian population. Nearly 800 families came, in the middle of the winter, and massed around the post of Bou Hamama. Accordingly, On 7 May 1958, the unit responded and combat engaged at Oued Kelaa with firm resolution.

In October 1958, the 13^{e} DBLE became an intervention regiment. The regiment was articulated into eight combat companies, including the mounted company, support company, employed at the exception, as companies of Fusiliers–Voltigeurs. Two tactical headquarter staff (EMT) mounted several companies on demand. In general, the first three were subordinated to FEMTI, the 4,5,6 to FEMT2, the CP and CA often in support of one or the other EMT. The composition number was 1778 men : 57 Officers, 249 Sous-Officiers and 1472 men. Such was put into effect for the officers due to a dozen of volunteers, out of which three were from the medical service, and lesser than a couple of dozens for the sous-officiers and the legionnaires. They had of a little harka, which was dissolved in June 1961.

The mission of this itinerary unit covered all Algeria, in a series of operations: « Emeraude », « Dordogne », « Georgevie », « Isère ». From Kabylie to the Atlas Mountains, Algiers to the Challe Line (French: Ligne Challe) designated as « Barrage est » at the Tunisian frontiers, then in the Aurès, where on 10 February 1961, the unit placed out of combat some 49 combatants and recuperated some 29 arms. The unit made way back to the « Bec de Canard », on the « Barrage est », where operations, patrols and ambushes succeeded until the end of combats in March 1962. At the independence of Algeria, the regiment left 214 tombs.

=== 1962–1977 ===
A first detachment joined Bougie (French: Bougie) to be embarked at the end of April 1962, destination French Somaliland (French: Côte française des Somalis) (Actual Republic of Djibouti). Progressively, the remainder units would follow. The regimental colors arrived on the territory on 15 October of the same year. The companies disembarked one after the other in the new lieu. Having not known peace for the last 22 years since existence, the "13^{e}" was at last able to justify reputation as "bâtisseur" which other units in the Legion rejoiced of.

The unit constructed and ameliorated various existing posts:

- The CCAS garrisoned at Gabode;
- The 1st company at Dikhil;
- The 2nd company at Gabode (works company);
- The 3rd company at Ali Sabieh;
- The 4th company at Holl-Holl;
- The ER (Reconnaissance squadron) at Oueah.

During this époque, the numbers in the regiment reached almost those of a sizeable battalion. On 1 October 1968, the regiment integrated a reconnaissance squadron. The 1st company ceded the respective lieu of implementation and went on to garrison in Dikhil. The 2nd company left Obock, took the denomination of 2nd works company (2^{e} CT) and joined the headquarter staff and the CCAS at Gabode, Djibouti headquarters.

On 25 August 1966, the President of the Republic, général de Gaulle, visited the territory. The units of the regiment in parade uniform rendered the respective honors of homage. Following the appearance of a banderole reclaiming the territory, manifestations were launched, and the sections of the 2nd company intervened in their parade uniform at 2000 and 2200 respectively. A dozen of ranked and legionnaires were wounded in the confrontation which caused officially thirty-six wounded with forces of the order and nineteen wounded with the manifesting groups. The next day, after the death of two manifesting individuals in the morning, at 1400, the regimental commander received the order to evacuate the place Lagarde where général de Gaulle was supposed to pronounce his speech. The 2nd, 3rd and 4th companies as well as two section of the CCAS were designated. The place was cleared in twenty five minutes starting at 1620. The confrontations continued at the level of blocked « Bender » by forces of the police reinforced by the Legion. In total, there were one killed and forty-six wounded in the forces of the order, three killed and two hundred and thirty eight wounded among the manifesting contingents.
The following days, a cover fire was established on the « ville indigène », which was quarantined and searched by patrols. Starting 14 September, the « 13^{e} » as well as the 5th Inter-arm Oure-Mer Regiment (French: 5^{e} RIAOM) installed a barrage which encircled the town to filter the exit and entry points. Composed of rows of barbed wire («ribard») and miradors stretching over 14 kilometers, this barrier was maintained until the independence and beyond. The number of individuals killed trying to cross it remains undetermined. On 20 March 1967, the following day of a referendum on the autonomy of the territory, independent manifestations were suppressed again by the men of the 3rd company. The end of 1967 and the year of 1968 were again occasions of numerous tensions and operations of maintaining order.

In 1976, the regiment and notably the reconnaissance squadron intervened during the Loyada Hostage Rescue Mission (French: Prise d'otages de Loyada).

=== 1977–2011 ===
Following the independence of the Republic of Djibouti in 1977, the 13^{e} DBLE participated regularly to military or humanitarian missions at the profit of the territories or in the Horn of Africa.

In 1979, the 4th company was dissolved. Their post of Holl-Holl was ceded to the National Army of Djibouti (AND). The regiment then consisted of only the 3rd company, the 2^{e} CT, the CCAS, the squadron and a company of the 2nd Foreign Parachute Regiment 2^{e} REP on a 4-month rotation, based in Arta.

The operational engagements succeeded. In May 1991 the regiment assured the control of country's border, which were submerged by a massive influx of refugees coming from Ethiopia, while simultaneously rescue collecting some, welcoming others and disarming an Ethiopian division (Operation Godoria (French: Opération Godoria). In March 1992, it would be the turn of Operation Iskoutir (French: opération Iskoutir). In December 1992, its Operation Oryx (French: opération Oryx), in Somalia, then a couple of month later, Operations of the United Nations in Somalia (French: ONUSOM II), where the legionnaires of the "13^{e}" served for a first time in their history under the Blue-Helmets (French: Casque Bleu) of the United Nations U.N. In June 1994, the third company was rushed to Rwanda within the cadre of Operation Turquoise (French: Opération Turquoise) and the regiment participated also to Operation Diapason (French: Opération Diapason) in Yemen. During the same year, in May, the COMPARA (paratrooper company), stationed in Arta and which was armed by the 2nd Foreign Parachute Regiment 2^{e} REP was dissolved.

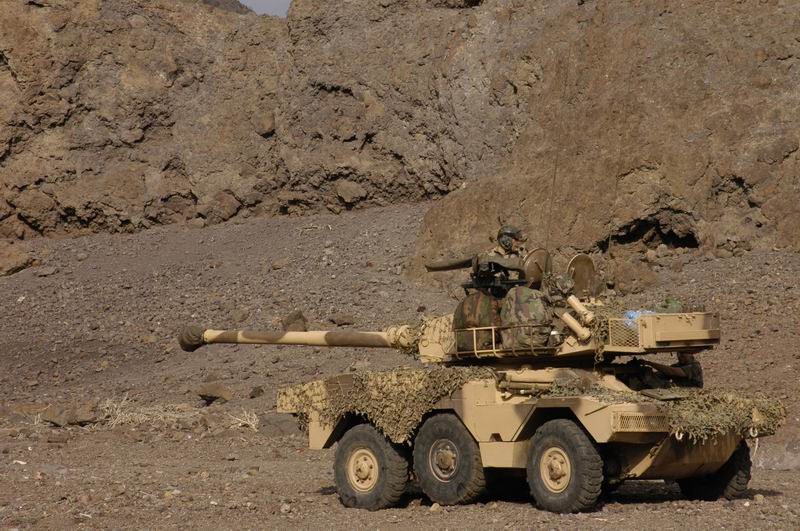
ERC 90 armored car of the 13th Demi-Brigade of the Foreign Legion in Djibouti.

It is convenient to add to all these operations, of the punctual assistance brought forth by the regiment to the young Republic during natural catastrophic disasters which saved the latter regularly. The legionnaires intervened also within the cadres of assuming relief measures, facing flooding disasters, but also facing dryness, to aid humanly populations affected harshly by weather circumstances as well. The 2^{e} CT (works company) was regularly placed on call to execute diverse works, including various numerous constructions on the territory. The commemorative steles of the Legion marked the efforts of a section which worked for collective goals and these commemorations can be seen across all routes of the territory.

in addition, this last specialty, the 2^{e}CT would assume the denomination of 2^{e} CAT (support and works company) by adding two support sections, one composed of six 120 mm mortars and the other section composed of 8 missile launcher posts.

This company was dissolved in 1998 to give place to a turning engineer company armed by the legionnaires of the 1st Foreign Engineer Regiment 1^{e} REG, then the 2nd Foreign Engineer Regiment 2^{e} REG.

In 2000, it is the turn of the 3rd infantry company to disappear, also replaced by a turning company, armed however alternatively by units of the 2nd Foreign Infantry Regiment 2^{e} REI and 2nd Foreign Parachute Regiment 2^{e} REP. This last infantry company of the "13^{e}" had a unique character. In fact, at the instar of the companies of the 2^{e} REP, each section had a specialty. The command section consisted of an 81 mm mortar group. The 1st section perfected the savoire-faire in the domain of sabotage and manipulation of explosives. The 2nd section regrouped the reconnaissance divers which were charged with infiltration missions by maritime means utilizing pneumatic boats or palms. The 3rd section regrouped the elite snipers of the regiment, equipping 12.7 mm Barret and 7.62 mm FRF2. The 4th section, consisted of five Véhicule de l'Avant Blindé VABs out of which two were equipped with 20 mm cannons.

In 2001, the maintenance company of French Forces stationed in Djibouti (French: Forces françaises stationnées à Djibouti, FFDj) was attached to the Demi-Brigade.

In 2002, elements of the regiments were projected to the Ivory Coast within the cadre of Operation Unicorn (French: Opération Licorne).

After an intervention of a humanitarian character, where a section of the engineers were projected to Indonesia in 2005 (Opération Béryx (French: Opération Béryx), to assist and aid the victims of 2014 earthquake and tsunami in the Indian Ocean (French: Séisme du 26 décembre 2004 dans l'océan Indien), the "13^{e}" revived operational capacities in March 2007. The tactical headquarter staff, the infantry company and an engineer detachment were sent in urgency, north of the Central African Republic to secure and contain the propagation of violence in the zone of the three frontiers (Tchad, RCA, Soudan) to Birao.

In addition, the legionnaires of the unit are, since the beginning of the years 2000, regularly engaged under form of instruction operational detachment (French: détachements d'instruction opérationnels) (DIO) assisting neighboring countries (Ethiopia, Uganda, United Arab Emirates, Qatar, Kuwait and numerous others).

=== 2011–2015: United Arab Emirates ===
On 31 July 2011, the 13^{e} DBLE left Djibouti and garrisoned in the United Arab Emirates at Camp de la Paix, the French military implementation in the United Arab Emirates, as a result of a defense cooperation agreement with France. This move was at the occasion of restructuring, the unit passing from a unit status of combat operational arm to that of a projected support force unit. The unit also bridged operations around the region in 2012 (Operation Tamour (French: Opération Tamour) in Jordan) and sent a quick detachment of almost 50 personnel to assist the counter-terrorism units of Iraq.

=== Since 2016: Camp du Larzac ===
On 30 July 2015, the transfert of the 13^{e} DBLE at Camp du Larzac in Aveyron, was announced in 2016. As of January 2016, with a demi-command company and logistics (CCL), two combat companies, numbers will pass from 69 to 390 then 450 legionnaires, followed in 2017 with the remainder of the CCL and two other combat companies, and in 2018 of a fifth combat company and the company of reconnaissance and support.

In 2022, the composition is about 1300 legionnaires at in five combat companies, one support company (CCL), and one reconnaissance and support company.

== Organization ==
=== Djibuti (2001) ===
- The CCS or command and support company, is mixed, composed of legionnaires in MCD and permanently based. The unit regrouped all projectable services, necessary to command the regiment (signals, operations section, medics, transport section). The unit also armed the CECAP which organized the various tactical desert training courses in desert zones. This unit formed the French Forces stationed in Djibouti (FFDj), as well as the recently commissioned infantry officers of the various institutions and foreign military units;
- The CM or maintenance company. This company is mixed, consisting of both legionnaires and soldiers of the arms material branch, in MCD or permanently posted. This unit assured the maintenance of all units of the French Army present on the territory;
- The ER or reconnaissance squadron (permanent unit). The squadron formed mainly of legionnaires from the 1st Foreign Cavalry Regiment 1^{e} REC and stationed in isolated posts, at Brunet de Sairigné, at Oueah, 40 km from Djibouti since 1968. The unit was equipped with light armor type ERC 90 Sagaie. The unit was autonomous at the scale of maintain materials and infrastructure;
- The Compagnie d'Infanterie. Manned alternatively by a company of the 2nd Foreign Infantry Regiment 2^{e} REI or 2nd Foreign Parachute Regiment 2^{e} REP, the unit was equipped with VAB and VLRA. The unit is formed of one section command, one support section (one group of 81 mm and another missile group), and three combat sections;
- The Compagnie de Génie. Hailing from the 1st Foreign Engineer Regiment 1^{e} REG and 2nd Foreign Engineer Regiment 2^{e} REG, is composed of a command section, three combat engineer sections, one support section and one works section. The latter was in charge in general of preparing roads or landing strips. Sometimes, one of these sections can pass all the MCD time in the desert, under tents, drawing a landing strip, in the most purest tradition of legionnaires bâtisseurs (builder).

=== United Arab Emirates (2011) ===
The unit became, in 2011, the support corps Groupement terre of the French Military Implementation in the UAE (French: Forces françaises aux Émirats arabes unis). The unit is decomposed of a support unit as well other units sent on the spot in short duration (4 months):

- Between 80 and 100 men seconded from units of the French Foreign Legion as support elements;
- A legion infantry company (provided alternatively by the 2nd Foreign Parachute Regiment 2^{e} REP and the 2nd Foreign Infantry Regiment 2^{e} REI);
- An artillery unit armed with CAESAR;
- An infantry unit armed with VBCI.

=== France (2018) ===
As an infantry regiment within the format defined in the cadre plan of the French Army "Au contact", the 13th Demi-Brigade of the Foreign Legion is composed of 1300 men grouped in eight companies:

- One CCL, command and logistics company, regrouping all necessary projectable services to the regiment's command engaged in operations (signals, operations section, medics, transport section and maintenance);
- Five combat companies each with a command section, a support section (81 mm mortar and anti-tank missiles), and three combat sections;
- One CEA (reconnaissance and support company), with a command section, a regimental reconnaissance section (patrols of VBL), an anti-tank missile section, and a 12.7mm sniper section paired with 7.62mm snipers.
- One reserve company composed of a command section and two combat sections.

== Traditions ==
=== Insignia ===
Regimental Insignia of the 13^{e} DBLE, other known as the "La Phalange Magnifique"

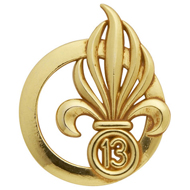
Beret insignia of the 13th Demi-Brigade of the Foreign Legion

=== Regimental Song ===
Chant de Marche : Nos Képis Blancs (Sous le soleil brulant d'Afrique) featuring:

1st couplet
Sous le soleil brûlant d'Afrique,
Cochinchine, Madagascar,
Une phalange magnifique,
A fait flotter nos étendards,
Sa devise «Honneur et vaillance»,
Forme des soldats valeureux,
Son drapeau celui de la France,
Est un emblème des plus glorieux.

Refrain
Vive la Légion étrangère,
Et quand défilent les képis blancs,
Si leur allure n'est pas légère,
Ils portent tous tête haute et fière,
Et s'élançant dans la fournaise,
Le cœur joyeux jamais tremblant,
Au son de notre Marseillaise,
Savent combattre les képis blancs.

2nd couplet
C'est une chose d'importance,
La discipline à la Légion,
L'amour du chef, l'obéissance
Sont de plus pure tradition,
Et pour notre France chérie,
Tous ces étrangers bravement,
Viennent défendre la patrie,
Avec honneur et dévouement.

=== Decorations ===
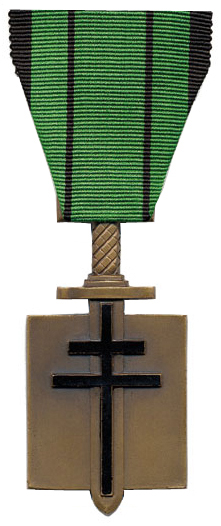
Croix de la libération

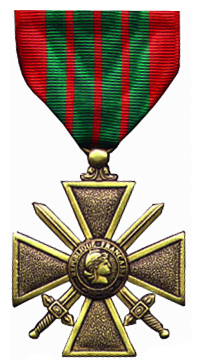
Croix de Guerre 39-45

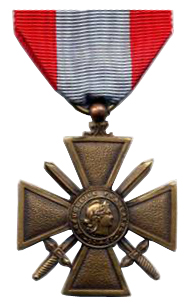
Croix de guerre des TOE

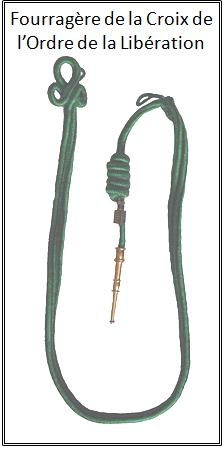
Fourragère at the ruban colors of the Croix de la libération

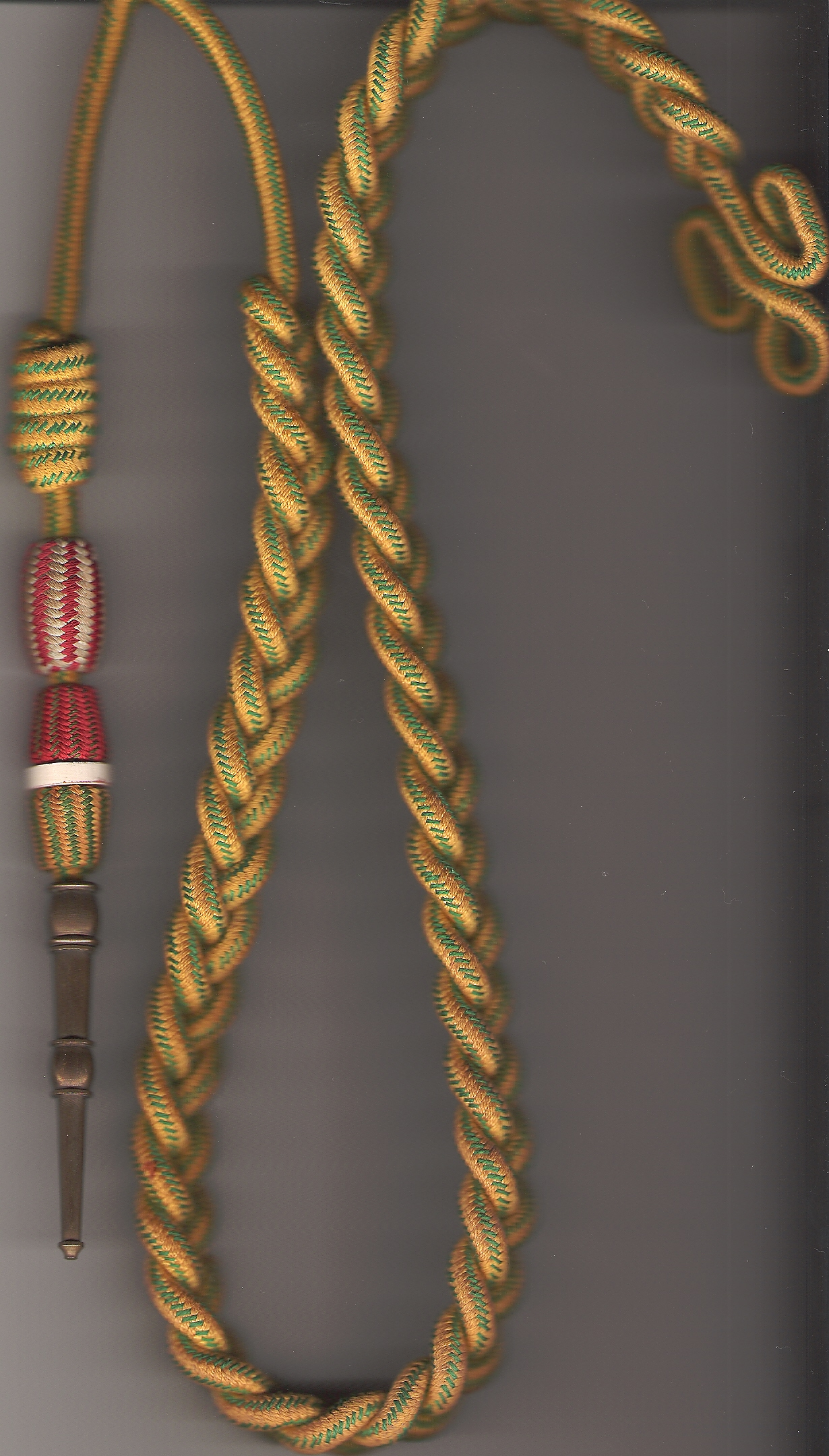
Fourragère at the ruban colors of the Médaille militaire

The Regimental colors of the 13e DBLE is decorated with the following:

- The companion of the Order of Liberation
- Four citations at the orders of the armed forces with attribution of the Croix de Guerre 39–45
- Four citations at the orders of the armed forces with attribution of the Croix de guerre des TOE
- Officer cross of the order of 27 June (independence order of the Djibouti).

=== Battle honours ===
- Camerone 1863
- Bjerkvik-Narvik 1940
- Keren-Massouah 1941
- Bir-Hakeim 1942
- El Alamein 1942
- Rome 1944
- Colmar 1945
- Authion 1945
- Indochine 1946–1954
- AFN 1952–1962

== Regimental commanders ==
- Lt. Col. Raoul Magrin-Vernerey (1940)
- Lt. Col. Alfred Cazoud (1940–1941)
- Lt. Col. Dimitri Amilakhvari (1941–1942)
- Major Gabriel Bablon (1942–1944)
- Major Paul Arnault (1944–1945)
- Lt. Col. Bernard Saint-Hillier (1945)
- Lt. Col. Gabriel Bablon (1946)
- Lt. Col. Gabriel Brunet de Sairigné (1946–1948)
- Lt. Col. Paul Arnaud (1948–1949)
- Lt. Col. René Morel (1949–1951)
- Lt. Col. Pierre Clément (1951–1953)
- Lt. Col. Guigard (1952–1953)
- Lt. Col. Jules Gaucher (1953–1954)
- Lt. Col. Lemeunier (1954)
- Lt. Col. Rossi (1954–1956)
- Lt. Col. Marguet (1956–1957)
- Lt. Col. Sanges (1957–1958)
- Lt. Col. Roux (1958–1961)
- Lt. Col. Vaillant (1961)
- Lt. Col. Dupuy de Querezieux (1961–1962)
- Lt. Col. Lacôte (1962–1965)
- Lt. Col. Geoffrey (1965–1968)
- Lt. Col. Gustave Fourreau (1968–1970)
- Lt. Col. Buonfils (1970–1972)
- Lt. Col. Pêtre (1972–1974)
- Lt. Col. Paul Lardry (1974–1976)
- Col. Jean-Claude Coullon (1976–1978)
- Lt. Col. Gillet (1978–1980)
- Lt. Col. Loridon (1980–1982)
- Lt. Col. Vialle (1982–1984)
- Lt. Col. Rideau (1984–1986)
- Lt. Col. Champeau (1986–1988)
- Lt. Col. Le Flem (1988–1990)
- Colonel Ibanez (1990–1992)
- Colonel J.P. Perez (1992–1994)
- Lt. Col. Emmanuel Beth (1994–1996)
- Lt. Col. Daniel Nougayrède (1996–1998)
- Lt. Col. Debleds (1998–2000)
- Colonel Jean Maurin (2000–2002)
- Colonel Chavancy (2002–2004)
- Lt. Col. Henri Billaudel (2004–2006)
- Colonel Marchand (2006–2008)
- Colonel Thierry Burkhard (2008–2010)
- Colonel Cyrille Youchtchenko (27 July 2010 to 21 July 2011)
- Lieutenant-colonel Tony Maffeis ( 21 July 2011 to 30 July 2013)
- Colonel Nicolas Heuze (30 July 2013 to 30 July 2015)
- Colonel Arnaud Goujon (30 July 2015 to 31 May 2016)
- Lieutenant-colonel Guillaume Percie du Sert (20 June 2016 to 30 June 2018)

== Notable officers and Legionnaires ==
- Général Marie-Pierre Kœnig, elevated to the dignity of Marshal of France at posthumous title in 1984, Captain of the 13^{e}DBLE during World War II.
- Général Raoul Magrin-Vernerey Ralph Monclar, first commander of the Demi-Brigade, the 1st Free French Division, and the French Battalion of the United Nations Organisation during the Korean War.
- Général d'armée Jean Simon, Captain of the 13^{e} DBLE beginning of 1940, regimental commander of the 3rd Foreign Infantry Regiment (1948), division commander of the 27th Alpine Infantry Division (1961), Chancellor of the Ordre de la Libération, military medaled as a général.
- Prince de Géorgie Dimitri Amilakvari, killed at the head of the demi-brigade on 4 October 1942.
- Pierre Messmer, Prime Minister of France, Ministre de la Défense, Captain during World War II.
- Général de brigade Jacques Pâris de Bollardière, 1^{e} REI, 4^{e} REI, captain 13^{e} DBLE (1940), regimental commander 3^{e} RCP/3rd SAS (1944), regimental commander 2^{e} RCP and 3^{e} RCP (1946); the only senior army officer to denounce the practice of torture during the Algerian War.
- Général de corps d'armée Bernard Saint-Hillier, Captain 13^{e} DBLE (1940), regimental commander 13^{e} DBLE (1945), Division commander 10th Parachute Division (1960).
- Susan Travers
- Capitaine de frigate Roger Barberot, Commandant squadron of the 1^{er} Régiment de Fusiliers Marins.
- Général André Lalande, designated as Chef de Bataillon of the 1st battalion of the Phalange magnifique in June 1943, Compagnon de la Libération.
- Général Hugues Geoffrey alias Hugo Gottlieb (former legionnaire), regimental commander 1965 to 1968.
- Général René Imbot, Lieutenant and Captain of the 13^{e} DBLE.
- Sergent-Chef Siegfried Freytag, from the German aviation (102 victories), served in the 13^{e} DBLE in Djibouti.
- Lieutenant-colonel Jacques Hogard, French paratrooper officer in the Legion.
- Colonel Gabriel Bablon, regimental commander of the 13^{e} DBLE (1942), Compagnon de la Libération

== See also ==
- French Army
- Serge Andolenko
- Music of the Foreign Legion (MLE)
- List of French Foreign Legion units
- Major (France)

== General references ==
- Fall, Bernard (2002) [1966]. Hell in a Very Small Place: The Siege of Dien Bien Phu. Da Capo Press. ISBN 978-0-306-81157-9.
- Maund, LEH. Assault from the Sea. London: Methuen, 1949.
- Porch, Douglas (1991). The French Foreign Legion. New York: HarperCollins. ISBN 978-0-06-092308-2.
- Windrow, Martin (2004). The Last Valley. Da Capo Press. ISBN 978-0-306-81386-3.
