= Jules Gaucher =

French army officer (1905–1954)

- Born: 13 September 1905; Bourges, France
- Died: 13 March 1954 (aged 48); Điện Biên Phủ, State of Vietnam
- Military career
- Allegiance: France
- Branch: French Army
- Service years: 1929–1954
- Rank: Lieutenant Colonel
- Nickname: The Old Man
- Commands: 13th Foreign Legion Demi-Brigade; Groupe Mobile 9
- Conflicts: Franco-Thai War; World War II; First Indochina War; *Battle of Hòa Bình; *Battle of Dien Bien Phu †

Jules Gaucher (13 September 1905 – 13 March 1954) was a French Army officer noted for his command of Foreign Legion troops in Indochina. He was killed at the Battle of Dien Bien Phu in 1954.

== Early life ==
Gaucher graduated from the French military academy at Saint-Cyr in 1929 and was commissioned as a Sous-lieutenant (2nd Lieutenant). He was posted to French Algeria and served as an officer with the Régiment de Tirailleurs Algériens from 1929 to 1931. He transferred to the Foreign Legion in 1931 and served in North Africa with the 1st Foreign Legion Regiment (1e REI) and the 3rd Foreign Legion Regiment (3e REI). In 1938 he was promoted to Capitaine (Captain) and transferred to 5th Foreign Infantry Regiment (5° REI) in Tonkin. When open conflict erupted between the occupying Japanese and French forces in March 1945, Gaucher led his battalion out of Hanoi and marched to Dien Bien Phu, where he received an encouraging radio message from General Charles De Gaulle. Pursued by the Japanese, he then led his soldiers into China. He was promoted to Chef de bataillon (Major) that same year and returned to the Foreign Legion depot at Sidi Bel Abbes where he joined 13e Démi-Brigade de la Légion Étrangère (13e DBLE).

== Indochina 1950–54 ==
Gaucher was appointed to command of 3rd battalion of 13th demi-brigade (III/13e DBLE) in 1949 and returned to Indochina at the head of his battalion in 1950 as part of the French Far East Expeditionary Corps to participate in the First Indochina War. Under his command, III/13e DBLE served throughout Indochina – notably in the Delta (1951) and at the Battle of Hòa Bình (1951–52). In 1951 he was promoted to lieutenant-colonel and asked to remain in Indochina with 13e DBLE instead of accepting command elsewhere. He served as second-in-command (executive officer) of 13e DBLE from 1951 to 1953, until in 1953 he was appointed as commander of 13e DBLE. He had the reputation of a tough and hard-drinking soldier.

=== Dien Bien Phu 1953–54 ===
Gaucher was appointed to command of Groupe Mobile 9 during the Battle of Dien Bien Phu. The group (equivalent to a regimental combat team) comprised three infantry battalions, the I/13e DBLE (Demi-brigade de Légion étrangère, Foreign Legion half-brigade), III/13e DBLE, and III/3e RTA (Régiment de tirailleurs algériens, Algerian sharpshooters regiment), and one artillery battery (the III/10e RAC). Stationed at the collection of strong points known as Béatrice to the northeast of the main base, Gaucher showed visitors that his men had cleared brambles and thickets to establish clear fields of fire and he expressed confidence in the formidable French defenses. By the beginning of March, Gaucher's men at Béatrice were taking casualties while on patrol, losing six officers in addition to the enlisted men.

On March 13, 1954, Gaucher made rounds among his men, pointing out weaknesses in defensive works and ordering final preparations for the attack he was confident would come that night. He told his men that Béatrice, overlooking the road and exposed on the northeastern edge of the French base, was "the little goat that the tiger eats for breakfast."

During the attack that indeed came that night, Gaucher's command post was hit by artillery fire. Suffering from serious wounds – the loss of both arms, severe injuries to both legs, and an open chest wound – he died at the hospital. His command of the base's central sub-sector was passed on to Lieutenant-colonel Pierre Langlais.

== Awards and honors ==
- Commander of the Legion of Honor
- Croix de Guerre with seven citations
- Colonial Medal with Maroc and Indochine campaign clasps
- 1939–1945 Commemorative war medal
- Indochina Campaign Commemorative Medal
- Officer of the Royal Order of Cambodia
- Commander of the Order of Ouissam Alaouite
- Officer of the Imperial Order of the Dragon of Annam
