= Bernard Saint-Hillier =

French general (1911–2004)

- Born: 29 December 1911; Dole, France
- Died: 28 July 2004 (aged 92); Paris, France
- Military career
- Allegiance: France
- Branch: French Army
- Service years: 1933–1971
- Rank: Général de corps d'armée
- Nickname: Jean de Vienne (Free French alias)
- Commands: 13th Foreign Legion Demi-Brigade; 10th Parachute Division
- Conflicts: World War II; Algerian War

Bernard Saint-Hillier (29 December 1911 – 28 July 2004) was a French general.

Saint-Hillier graduated from Saint-Cyr in 1933 and was assigned to the 11th Chasseurs alpins Battalion. In 1938, he joined the French Foreign Legion with the rank of captain. He sided with the Fighting French and took part in the East African Campaign with the 13th Foreign Legion Demi-Brigade.

In 1943, he was promoted to commandant, and to lieutenant-colonel in 1944. He took command of the 13th Foreign Legion Demi-Brigade on the 25 March 1945. From 1946, he was assigned to the general staff of the Armed Forces, where he spent two years.

In 1951, he was promoted to colonel, and led the 18th paratrooper regiment, until he departed to Indochina in 1954. On his return, he studied at the Institut des hautes études de la défense nationale.

In 1958, Saint-Hillier was chief of the general staff in Constantine, Algeria. Promoted to general of brigade in 1959, he became chief of cabinet of the Minister of Defence. From 1960 to 1961, he commanded the 10th Parachute Division. He was French military representative to the European Allied command in 1962.

In 1965, he was promoted to general of division, and served as inspector of the staffs of the Army. Saint-Hillier was promoted to Général de corps d'armée in 1968, commanding the 3rd Military Region in Rennes, and sitting at the Conseil supérieur de la Guerre.

He retired in 1971.

== Decorations ==
- Grand Cross of the Legion of Honour
- Compagnon de la Libération (27 May 1943)
- Croix de Guerre 1939-1945 (9 mentions in despatches)
- Croix de la Valeur Militaire (2 mentions in despatches)
- Médaille de la Résistance
- Médaille coloniale with Eritrea, Libya, Bir Hakeim and Tunisia clasps
- Médaille de l'Aéronautique
- Distinguished Service Order (United Kingdom)
- War Cross with sword (Norway)
- Commander of Nichan Iftikar (Tunisia)
