= Combat Training Center at Arta Beach =

- Arta, Djibouti in France
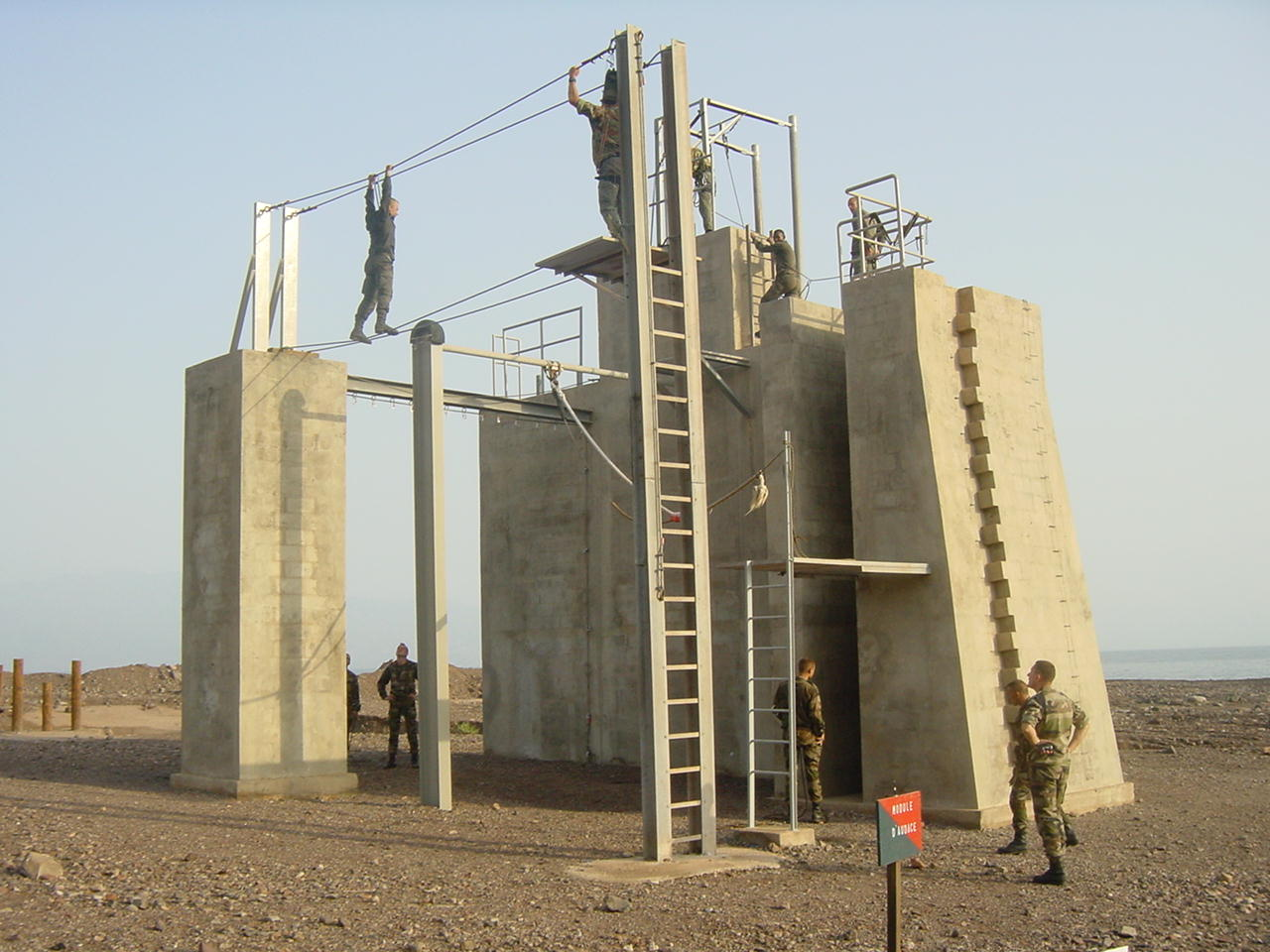
- Training Element at Combat Training Center at Arta Beach

Site information
- Type: Training
- Controlled by: (France) French Army
- Website: Official Website

Location
- Coordinates: 11.5830°N 42.8207°E

Site history
- In use: 1978–present

Garrison information
- Garrison: 5eme Régiment Interarmes d'Outre-Mer

The Combat Training Center at Arta Beach (CECAP), or Centre d'entraînement au combat d'Arta Plage, is a French Army training facility located in Arta, Djibouti. The Combat Training Center is run by the members of the Foreign Legion and is part of the headquarters company of 13th Demi-Brigade of the Foreign Legion.

== Overview ==
The Combat Training Center at Arta Beach was established in 1978 as an amphibious warfare training center. However in 1982 CECAP became the Commando Center reflecting a slight change from its original purpose; by 2003 CECAP had increasingly become a combat training capability. The similarity of the center's environment to Afghanistan was useful to the French armed forces and CECAP began offering courses preparing soldiers for that region's environment.

== Training ==
Military instruction at CECAP occurs through recurring military exercises held at the Arta Beach Facility. CECAP in addition to training French soldiers accepts American soldiers into its training programs. CECAP has the capacity to accommodate for approximately sixty soldiers in training at any given time.
