= Instruction Group of the Foreign Legion =

The Instruction Group of the Foreign Legion (French: Groupement d'instruction de la Légion étrangère (G.I.L.E)) was stationed at Bonifacio (Corsica) for instruction and at Corté (Minoterie) for the instruction of the cadres and specialists (CICS), then at the citadel of Corté at the beginning of the years 1960 after the departure of Algeria.

The Legion was garrisoned at Corsica by the government in 1962, the Instruction Group of Legion joined Bonifacio and Corté, while depending nf the 1st Foreign Regiment 1^{er} RE, garrisoned at Aubagne.

On September 1, 1972, was recreated the 2nd Foreign Regiment consisting of the GILE at Corte and the GOLE at Bonifacio:

- The GILE counted then 4 companies, the 1st and 2nd instruction companies of foreign volunteers, the instruction company of cadres (CIC) and the specialist instruction company (CIS). The second company was stationed at the citadel of Corté, the three others at the camp de La Minoterie.
- The Operational Group of the Foreign Legion GOLE, was composed of the 5th, 6th and 7th companies respectively.

In 1976, two companies headed towards the continent:

- 1st company of Captain Leguen.
- 2nd company of Captain Bernier, garrisoned at the 1st Foreign Cavalry Regiment 1^{e} REC at Orange, within the localities of the 4th squadron sent temporarily to Corté.

The two companies joined garrison Lapasset of Casterlnaudary of November 23, 1976, as well as the commandment of the GILE (chef de bataillon Estay).

The Instruction Regiment of the Foreign Legion (French: Régiment d'instruction de la Légion étrangère, (RILE)) was created on September 1, 1977, a 3rd company of instruction was created, the CIC joined Casternaudary, then the CIS. The RILE assumed the designation of 4th Foreign Regiment 4^{e} RE on June 1, 1980.

== See also ==
- Major (France)
