= Mường Pồn =

- Commune and village
- Location in Vietnam
- Coordinates: 21°33′N 103°1′E
- Country: Vietnam
- Province: Điện Biên
- Time zone: UTC+07:00 (Indochina Time)

Mường Pồn is a commune (xã) and village of the Điện Biên Province, northwestern Vietnam. Less than 4 kilometres from the Lao border, it lies along National Route 12, north by road from Dien Bien Phu.

The Standing Committee of the National Assembly promulgated Resolution No. 1661/NQ-UBTVQH15 on the rearrangement of commune-level administrative units of Điện Biên Province in 2025 (the Resolution takes effect from 16 June 2025). Accordingly, the entire natural area and population of Mường Mươn Commune and Mường Pồn Commune are rearranged to form a new commune named Mường Pồn Commune.

== History ==
A small French force was located here before the Battle of Dien Bien Phu. After a two-day siege, it fell to the Viet Minh on 12 December 1953, despite an attempt to relieve the garrison by Pierre Langlais. The village was burned to the ground.
