= Quartier Captaine Danjou =

Barracks in Castelnaudary, France

Coordinates: 43.297608°N 1.980215°E

Quartier Capitaine Danjou is a barracks in Castelnaudary in France. The barracks is home to the 4th Foreign Regiment of the French Army.
