= Dimitri Amilakhvari =

French Army officer (1906–1942)

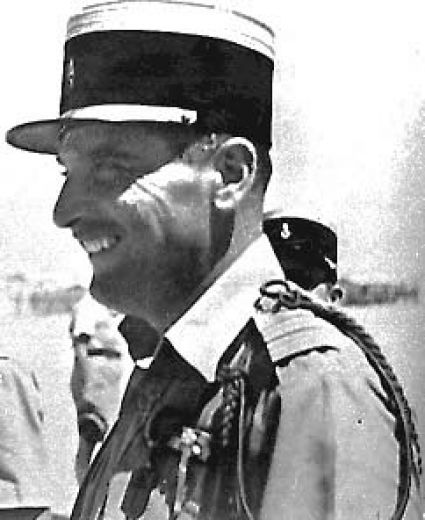
- Amilakvari in 1942
- Born: 31 October 1906
- Died: 24 October 1942 (aged 35)
- Military career
- Allegiance: France; Free France
- Branch: French Foreign Legion
- Service years: 1926–1942
- Rank: Lieutenant Colonel
- Commands: 13th Demi-Brigade of the Foreign Legion
- Conflicts: Phoney War World War II: Norwegian Campaign; Battles of Narvik; East African Campaign; North African Campaign; Battle of Bir Hakeim; Second Battle of El Alamein †
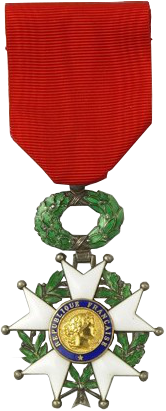
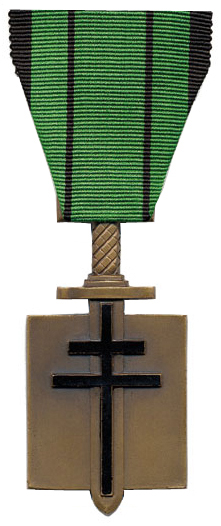
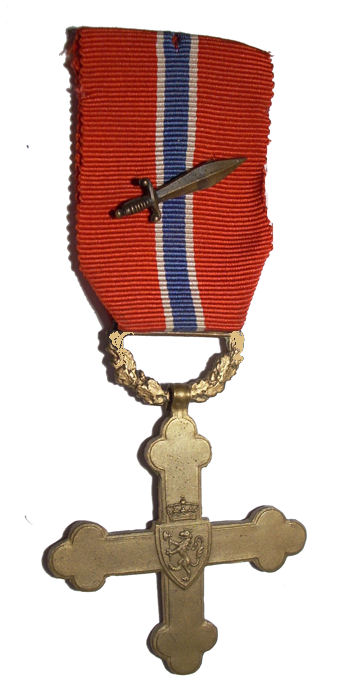
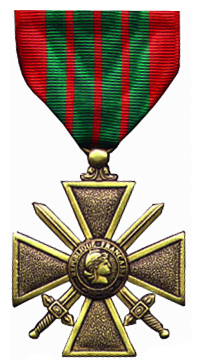
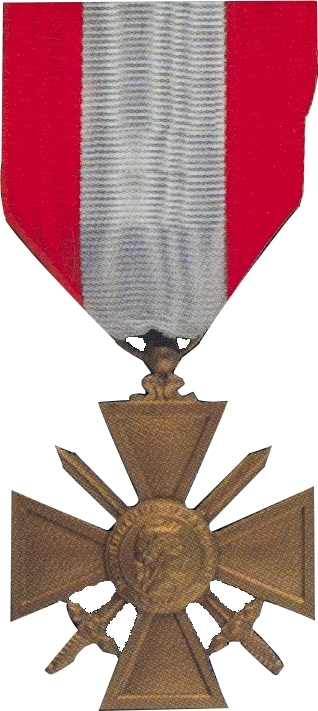
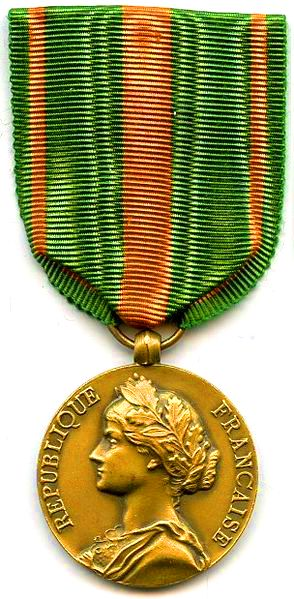
- Awards

Prince Dimitri Zedginidze-Amilakhvari, more commonly known as Dimitri Amilakhvari (Georgian: დიმიტრი ამილახვარი, French: Dimitri Amilakvari; 31 October 1906 – 24 October 1942) was a French military officer of noble Georgian descent and Lieutenant Colonel of the French Foreign Legion. Under the nickname "Bazorka", he became an iconic figure who played an influential role in the Free French Forces fight against the Nazis in World War II.

Strategic Dialogue Format between France and Georgia bears his name.

== Early life and career ==
Amilakhvari was born in Bazorkino (now Chermen, North Ossetia–Alania, Russian Federation), where his family had moved from their ancestral estate at Gori, Georgia during the Russian Revolution of 1905. The house of Zedginidze-Amilakhvari had formerly served as hereditary Master of the Horse to the Georgian Crown (Amilakhvari) and retained their princely dignity during the Imperial Russian rule of Georgia. Dimitri's grandfather, Ivane Amilakhvari (1829–1905), was an eminent general in the Russian army. His father, Colonel Giorgi Zedginidze-Amilakhvari, also served in the Russian military and transferred his loyalty to the short-lived Democratic Republic of Georgia in 1918–1921. After the formation of Georgian Soviet Socialist Republic in 1921, the family fled to Istanbul, Ottoman Empire, where Dimitri attended a local British School, and later, in 1922, emigrated to France.

In 1924, Dimitri Amilakhvari entered the École Spéciale Militaire de Saint-Cyr and was commissioned as a second lieutenant after his graduation in 1926. At the same time, he was posted to the French Foreign Legion and promoted to lieutenant in 1926. He later served in French North Africa and took part in all important operations in the south of Morocco from 1932 to 1933. From 1934 to 1939, he was Head of the French military school in Agadir, being promoted to captain in 1937. Following his naturalisation as a French citizen, he married another member of the exiled Georgian nobility, Princess Irina, née Dadiani (1904–1944) in August 1927. Note that during his French service, the spelling of his surname was modified, dropping the 'h'.

By his wife, Amilakhvari had three children, sons Georges and Othar, and daughter Thamar Amilakhvar, all of whom married and had offspring.

== World War II ==
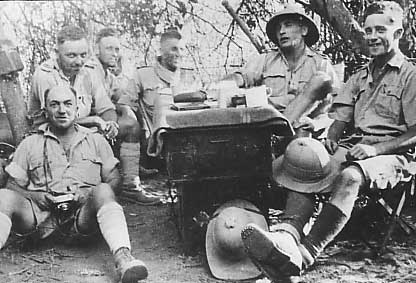
Captain Amilakhvari (2nd from right) with French soldiers, 1941.

During the "Phoney War" before the German occupation of France, Amilakhvari was serving in Algiers in North Africa, but in the spring of 1940 he joined the French expeditionary force earmarked for the Norwegian Campaign. He fought at Narvik and was then evacuated to the United Kingdom, where he joined the Free French Forces. He then took part in the unhappy campaigns against the Vichy French forces in West Africa, at Dakar (in Senegal), and Equatorial Africa, in Cameroun. In a remarkable record of service, his war service in 1940 had thus taken him from Africa to the Arctic Circle and back again, as far as the Equator, all in the space of a few months.

Amilakhvari's next move took him halfway round the continent to Eritrea, in East Africa, to join the East African Campaign against Italy in early 1941, but by the summer he was on the move again, to take part in another campaign against Vichy France (with units of the French Foreign Legion serving on both sides of the conflict), in Syria. This would be the closest he would come to the land of his birth. Amilakhvari then assumed command of the 13th Demi-Brigade of the Foreign Legion on 6 September 1941.

In 1942, Amilakhvari was back in North Africa, facing the German and Italian forces in Libya as part of the North African Campaign. During the hard fighting at Bir-Hakeim (January) he wrote: "We, foreigners, have only one way to prove to France our gratitude: to be killed ...". Nevertheless, he survived, and in June he was made a Companion of the Liberation, a decoration second only to the Légion d'honneur. In 1942 he was also awarded the Krigskorset med Sverd or Norwegian War Cross with Sword for his earlier service in Norway. This is Norway's highest military decoration for gallantry and he was one of only 66 Frenchmen awarded this decoration during the Second World War.

In October 1942, the Allies began the final offensive in North Africa with the Second Battle of El Alamein. This battle took the Allied forces right across Libya and into French North Africa, where Amilakhvari had begun his operational service. However, Amilakhvari did not live to complete his great African odyssey, as he was killed in action on the second day of the battle.

In May 1940, Amilakhvari was awarded a Chevalier of the Legion of Honour (Légion d'honneur). Later, General Charles De Gaulle named him and his legionaries the "Pride of France" for their heroic defence of the Allies' positions.

== Honours and awards ==
- Chevalier of the Légion d'honneur (1940)
- Companion of the Liberation (9 September 1942)
- Croix de Guerre 1939-1945 with four palms (5 citations)
- Croix de guerre des Théatres d'Opérations Exterieures (2 citations)
- Médaille des Évadés
- Colonial Medal with clasp "Morocco"
- War Cross with Sword (Norway)
- Officer of the Order of Ouissam Alaouite (Morocco)
