= 4th Foreign Regiment (France) =

- 4^{e} régiment étranger
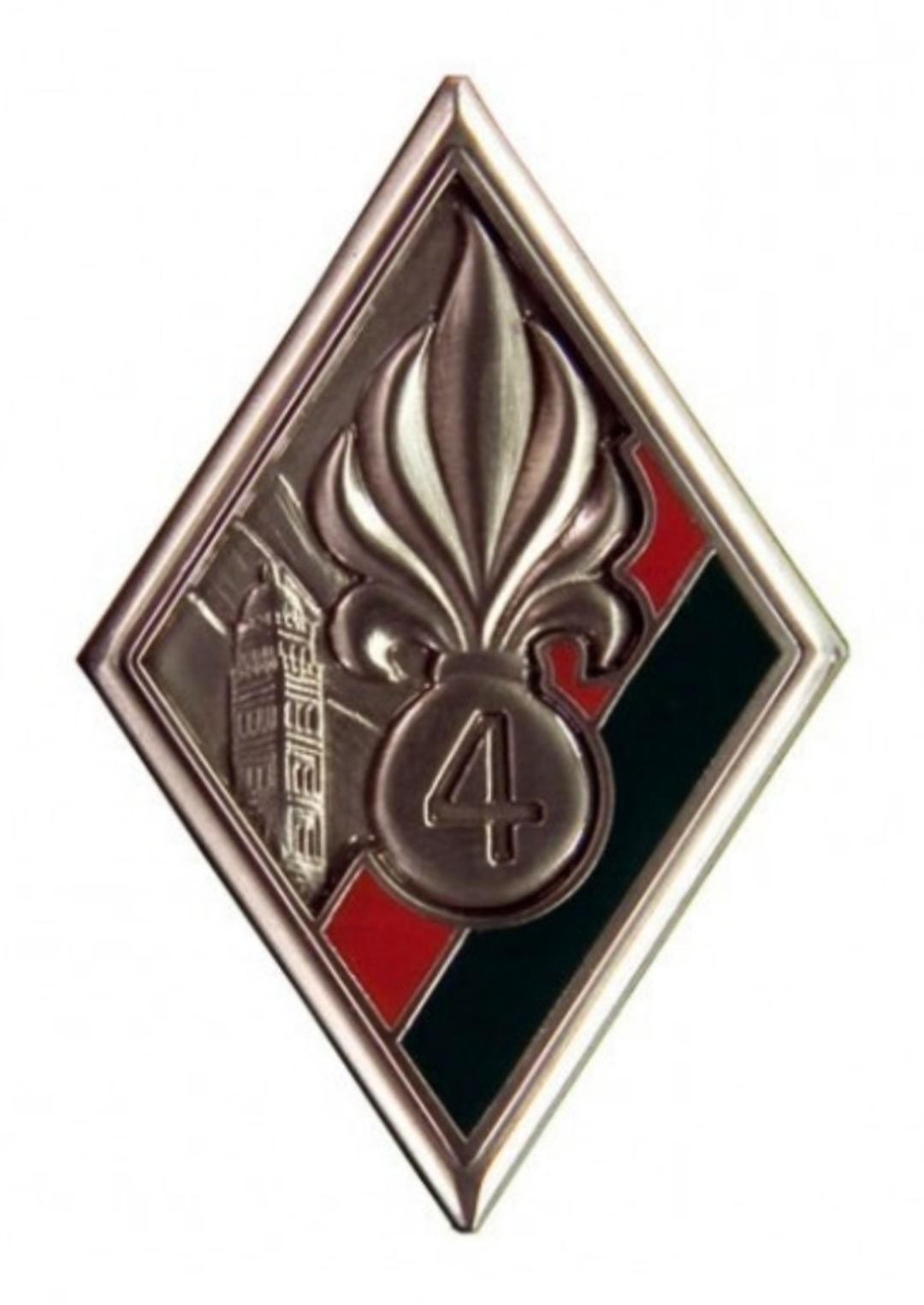
- Regimental badge of 4^{e} RE
- Active: 1920–1940; 1941–1943; 1948–1963; 1976 – Present
- Country: France
- Branch: French Army
- Role: Instruction command Recruit induction & Training
- Part of: Foreign Legion Command
- Garrison/HQ: Quartier Captaine Danjou, Castelnaudary, Aude, France
- Nickname: Creuset de la Légion (Crucible of the Legion)
- Colors: Green & Red
- Battles/Wars: Rif War (1924–1934); Syrian Revolution (1921–1926); Second World War * Tunisia Campaign (1943); Malagasy Uprising (1947–1951); First Indochina War (1949); Algerian War (1955–1964)
- Decorations: Croix de guerre (1939-1945) w/ Palm
- Website: Official Website

Insignia
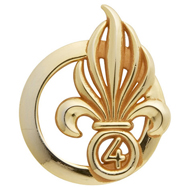
- Beret insignia of the 4th Foreign Regiment
- Abbreviation: 4^{e} RE

The 4th Foreign Regiment (French: 4^{e} Régiment étranger, 4^{e} RE) is a training regiment of the Foreign Legion in the French Army. Prior to assuming the main responsibility of training Legion recruits, it was an infantry unit which participated in campaigns in Morocco, Levant, French Indochina, and Algeria.

== History, creation and different designations ==
Created in November 1920 in Marrakesh, Morocco, the 4th Foreign Regiment became the 4th Foreign Infantry Regiment in 1922. Following its formation, the regiment was engaged in campaigns in Morocco in the Rif War between 1920 and 1934. The 4th and 5th battalions saw active service in the Levant between 1921 and 1926.

=== World War II ===
Dissolved in November 1940 to allow the creation of the 11th Foreign Infantry Regiment, 12th Foreign Infantry Regiment and then the 13th Demi-Brigade of the Foreign Legion, the 4th Foreign Regiment was recreated in 1941 under the designation of 4th Demi-Brigade of the Foreign Legion. The regiment participated in 1943 in the Tunisian campaign, seeing combat in the Zaghouan Mountain (or djebel). The regiment was again dissolved in June 1943, and its personnel were transferred to the Marching Regiment of the Foreign Legion (R.M.L.E.), which experienced heavy combat during the campaigns of France and Germany.

=== Far East and North Africa ===
The 4th Foreign Regiment was recreated in 1946. Battalions saw active service in Madagascar between 1947 and 1951. In the Far East, the 2nd and 5th battalions served as a single unit before being broken up to reinforce other regiments. Again dissolved in 1951, the <<4th>> was recreated in Morocco in March 1955, before being engaged in combat in Algeria between 1957 and 1962.

In July 1962, the 4th Foreign Regiment was redeployed to Reggane in southern Algeria, tasked with guarding the oil fields and French nuclear facilities in the region. Subsequently the 4th Foreign Regiment was disbanded and its subordinate units incorporated into the 2nd Foreign Infantry Regiment. In October 1976 the Foreign Legion established a new Instruction Regiment (Regiment d'Instruction) at Castelnaudary by divesting the 2nd Foreign Infantry Regiment's Instruction Group (Groupement d' Instruction).

=== Regiment of Instruction ===
On September 1, 1977, the regimental colors of the 4^{e} Etranger were entrusted to the Instruction Regiment of the Foreign Legion which had taken up garrison duties at Castelnaudary, a year earlier. On June 1, 1980, the unit was redesignated as the 4th Foreign Regiment.

=== Present role ===
Now based at Castelnaudary for more than 30 years, first at the Lapasset barracks then at the Danjou barracks, the regiment has trained multinational cadres, specialists and foreign volunteer recruits. The training cadre comprises about 44 officers, 170 warrant officers and non-commissioned officers, and 358 enlisted personnel.

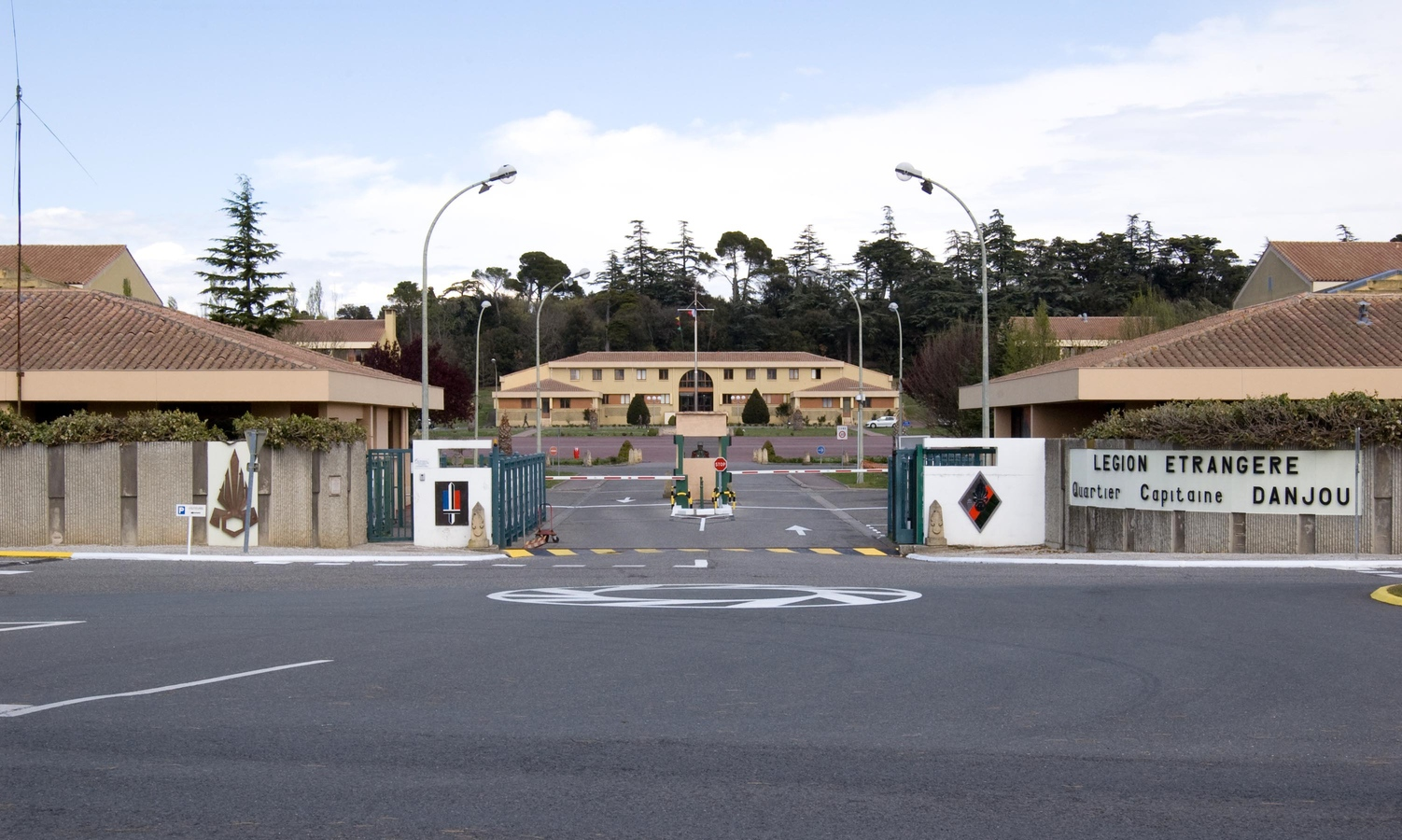
Barracks in Castelnaudary, France

== Campaigns ==
- TINTEGHALINE, de TIZI N’RECHOU (1922)
- D’OUAOUIZERT (1922)
- RIFF WAR (1924 – 1934)
- LEVANT (1921 – 1926), MESSIFRE (1925)
- CAMPAGNE DE TUNISIE (1943)
- MADAGASCAR (1947–1951)
- INDOCHINA (1949)
- MAROCCO – ALGERIA (1955 - 1964)

== Companies ==
The Regiment consists of six companies:

- Legion Pionniers Groups
- Compagnie de Commandement et des Services (CCS) - Command and Services Company

The regimental headquarters company which also has integrated logistical capabilities. This company has several subordinate administrative units such as the Office of Maintenance and Logistics, the Office of Job Training (Bureaux Instruction Empoi), and the Directorate of Human Resources (Direction des Ressources Humaines).

- Compagnies d’Étranger Volontaire (CEV) - Foreign Volunteer Companies

Responsible for performing recruit basic training. The regiment has three such companies.

- Compagnie d’Instruction des Cadres (CIC) - Cadre Training Company

Conducts all NCO education and professional development courses.

- Compagnie d’Instruction des Spécialistes (CIS) - Specialist Instruction Company

Conducts training courses in administrative and technical skill. This company teaches over forty courses a year ranging from three to fifteen weeks each.

== Traditions ==
=== Insignia ===
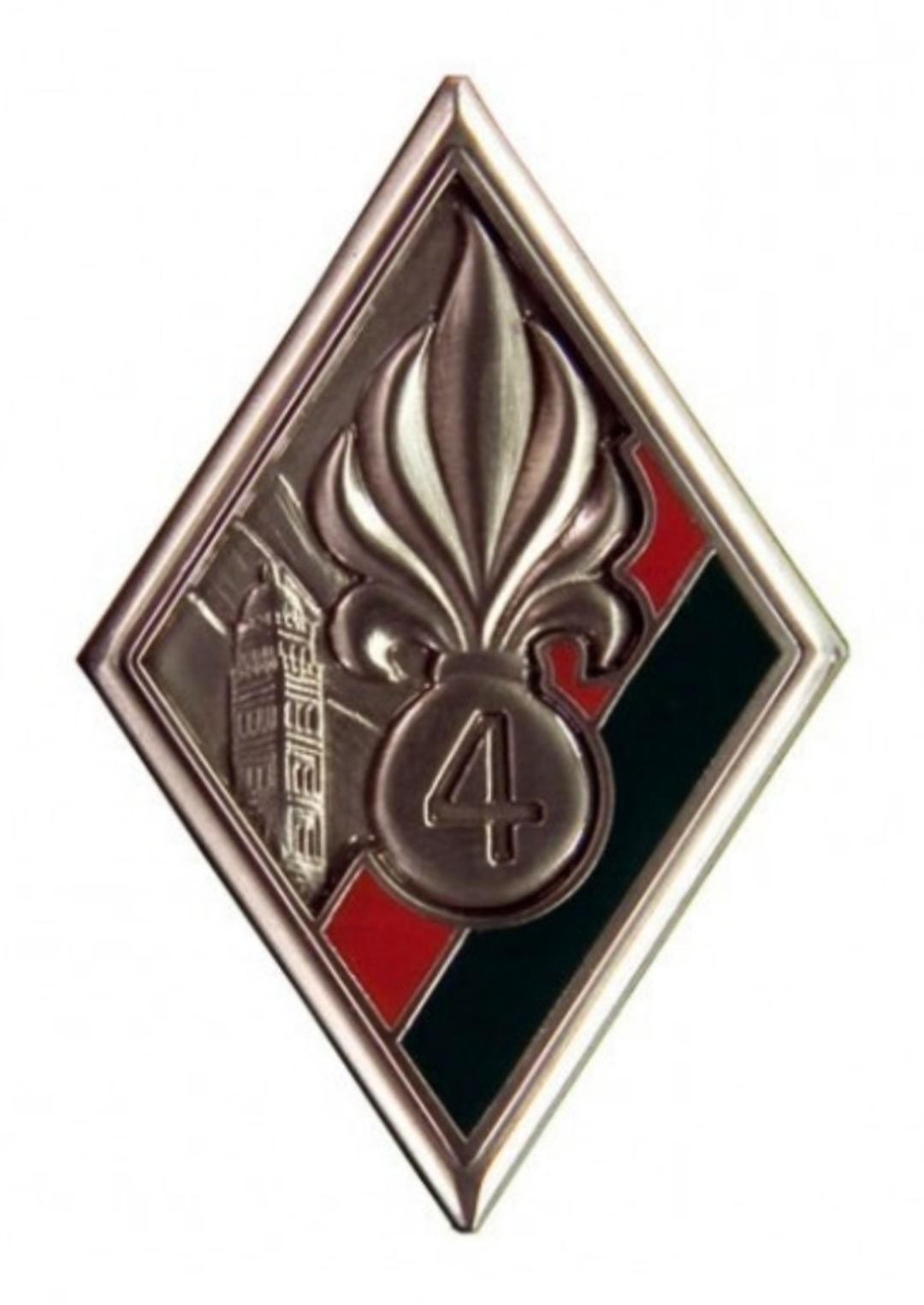
Regimental Insignia of the 4th Foreign Regiment, 4^{e} R.E

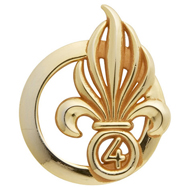
Beret insignia of the 4th Foreign Regiment, 4^{e} R.E

=== Regimental Colors ===
Inscribed on the regimental colors of the 4th Foreign Regiment are the motto of the Foreign Legion:

"Honneur et Fidélité"

=== Code of Honour ===
- Art. 1 - Légionnaire, tu es un volontaire, servant la France avec honneur et fidélité.
- Art. 2 - Chaque légionnaire est ton frère d'armes, quelles que soient sa nationalité, sa race ou sa religion. Tu lui manifestes toujours la solidarité étroite qui doit unir les membres d'une même famille.
- Art. 3 - Respectueux des traditions, attaché à tes chefs, la discipline et la camaraderie sont ta force, le courage et la loyauté tes vertus.
- Art. 4 - Fier de ton état de légionnaire, tu le montres dans ta tenue toujours élégante, ton comportement toujours digne mais modeste, ton casernement toujours net.
- Art. 5 - Soldat d'élite, tu t'entraînes avec rigueur, tu entretiens ton arme comme ton bien le plus précieux, tu as le souci constant de ta forme physique.
- Art. 6 - La mission est sacrée, tu l'exécutes jusqu'au bout et si besoin, en opérations, au péril de ta vie.
- Art. 7 - Au combat, tu agis sans passion et sans haine, tu respectes les ennemis vaincus, tu n'abandonnes jamais ni tes morts, ni tes blessés, ni tes armes.

=== Regimental Song ===
Chant de Marche : C'est le 4 en chantant featuring:

À travers pierres et dunes,
S'en vont les képis blancs.
Sous le soleil, clair de lune,
Nous marchons en chantant.
Vers Bechar ou vers Casa,
Dans toutes les direction,
Nous repartons au combat,
Pour la gloire de la Légion.

C'est le 4 en chantant qui s'avance,
Qui s'avance, laissez-le passer.

Sur les pistes des Corbières,
Nous partons en mission.
Une colonne de bérêts verts,
S'en va à l'instruction.
Vers la Jasse ou vers Bel-Air,
Dans toutes les directions,
Devenir légionnaire,
C'est notre seule ambition.

=== Decorations ===
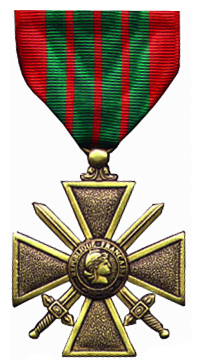
Croix de guerre 39-45 with palm

=== Honors ===
==== Battle Honors ====
- CAMERONE 1863
- MAROC 1914–1918-1921-1934
- DJEBEL ZAGHOUAN 1943
- A.F.N 1952 - 1962

== Regimental and Demi-Brigade Commanders ==
4th Foreign Infantry Regiment Tenure (1920-1940)
4ème Regiment Etranger d'Infanterie,(4^{e} R.E.I)

- 1920 - 1926 : colonel Maurel
- 1927 - 1927 : colonel Pourailly (January to May)
- 1927 - 1928 : colonel Poupillier
- 1928 - 1932 : colonel Mathieu
- 1933 - 1936 : colonel Conte
- 1936 - 1940 : lieutenant-colonel Lorillard
- 1940 - 1940 : lieutenant-colonel Genits

4th Demi-Brigade of the Foreign Legion
4 ème Demi-Brigade de La Légion Etrangère,(4^{e} D.B.L.E)

- 1941 - 1941 : Lieutenant-colonel Bouty (August - September)
- 1941 - 1943 : Lieutenant-colonel Gentis

1st Foreign Motorized Infantry Regiment
1er Régiment Etranger d'Infanterie Motorisé(1er R.E.I.M)

- 1943 - 1943: Lieutenant-colonel Gentis (March to June)

4th Foreign Infantry Regiment (Morocco) - 4th Demi-Brigade of the Foreign Legion
4ème Regiment Etranger d'Infanterie (Maroc) - 4ème Demi-Brigade de La Légion Etrangère
(4ème R.E.I. (Maroc) - 4ème D.B.L.E. (Maroc))

- 1946 - 1948 : Lieutenant-colonel Laparra
- 1948 - 1951 : Lieutenant-colonel Gabriel Bablon
- 1951 - 1951 : Lieutenant-colonel Sourd (March to May)

2/4 D.B.L.E. - 4/4 R.E.I. (Madagascar)

- 1947 - 1949 : battalion commander Perin
- 1949 - 1950 : battalion commander Brinon
- 1950 - 1951 : lieutenant colonel Royer

1/4 R.E.I.

- 1951 - 1952 : battalion commander Gaucher
- 1951 - 1954 : battalion commander Pfirmann
- 1954 - 1954 : battalion commander Dubos (January to June)
- 1954 - 1955 : battalion commander Hauteclocque

4th Foreign Infantry Regiment Tenure (1955-1964)
4ème Regiment Etranger d'Infanterie,(4^{e} R.E.I)

- 1955 - 1957 : colonel Borreil
- 1957 - 1959 : colonel Lemeunier
- 1959 - 1961 : lieutenant-colonel Georgeon
- 1961 - 1962 : lieutenant-colonel Vadot
- 1962 - 1964 : lieutenant-colonel Brule

Instruction Regiment of the Foreign Legion
Régiment d’Instruction de La Légion Etrangère (R.I.L.E)

- 1977 - 1979 : lieutenant-colonel Forcin
- 1979 - 1980 : lieutenant-colonel Jean

4th Foreign Regiment Tenure (1980–present)
4e régiment étranger,(4^{e} R.E.)

- 1980 - 1981 : colonel Jean
- 1981 - 1983 : colonel Latournerie
- 1983 - 1985 : colonel Bernard Colcomb
- 1985 - 1987 : colonel kreher
- 1987 - 1989 : colonel Seignez
- 1989 - 1991 : colonel Bernard Grail
- 1991 - 1993 : colonel Dureau
- 1993 - 1995 : colonel Pinard Legry
- 1995 - 1997 : colonel Buffeteau
- 1997 - 1999 : colonel Pichot de Champfleury
- 1999 - 2001 : colonel Barbaud
- 2001 - 2003 : colonel Thiebault
- 2003 - 2005 : colonel Kotchine
- 2005 - 2007 : colonel Roqueplo
- 2007 - 2009 : colonel Pau
- 2009 - 2011 : colonel Mistral
- 2011 - 2013 : colonel Talbourdel
- 2013 - 2015 : colonel Lobel
- 2015 - 2017 : Lieutenant-colonel Dufour
- 2017 - 20** : Lieutenant-colonel de ROFFIGNAC
