= André Lalande =

French general (1913–1995)

- Born: 26 May 1913; Rennes, France
- Died: 19 October 1995 (aged 82); Brive-la-Gaillarde, France
- Military career
- Allegiance: France
- Branch: French Army; Chasseurs Alpins; French Foreign Legion
- Service years: 1931–1973
- Rank: Général de corps d'armée
- Commands: 3rd Foreign Infantry Regiment; French Army Light Aviation; 11th Light Intervention Division; Chief of the Military Staff of the President of the Republic
- Conflicts: World War II; *Battle of Narvik; *Battle of Bir Hakeim *disembarking in Provence; *Battle of Alsace; First Indochina War; *Battle of Dien Bien Phu; Algerian War
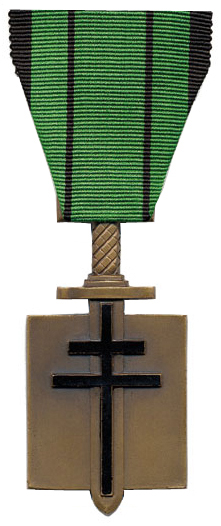
- Awards: Grand officier de la Légion d'honneur Compagnon de la Libération Médaille de la Résistance; Croix de guerre 1939-1945; Croix de guerre des TOE; Croix de la Valeur militaire

André Lalande (26 May 1913 – 19 October 1995) was a French Army officer and general in the Chasseurs Alpins and French Foreign Legion. He fought during the World War II at the heart of the Free French Forces, then in Indochina and Algeria.

== Military career ==
A graduate of École spéciale militaire de Saint-Cyr, promotion of Tafilalet 1931–1933, he was assigned as a sous-lieutenant at Metz.

In 1937, following his request, he was assigned to the 6th Alpins Chasseurs Battalion (French: 6^{e} Bataillon de Chasseurs Alpins, BCA). The unit was combat engaged in Norway during the Battle of Narvik from April to June 1940, where he was wounded.

Since July 1940 and during the war, Lalande joined the Free French Forces. In December 1941, he was assigned to the 13th Demi-Brigade of Foreign Legion 13^{e} DBLE garrisoned in Beirut. It was with this unit that he combat engaged to the Battle of Bir Hakeim in May 1942, a battle during which he was wounded in action again.

Promoted to Chef de Bataillon in June 1943 of the war, he assumed command of the 1st Battalion of the phalange magnifique. His unit was part of 1st Free French Division and partook to the assault against the Gustave line in Italy in the spring of 1944, as well as to the disembarking in Provence in August 1944. He then participated to the Battle of Alsace (French: batailles en Alsace) in the Alpes in April 1945.

At the end of World War II, following an assignment to a post attached to the cabinet of the Minister of the Armies, and a promotion to the rank of lieutenant-colonel, he volunteered to serve in French Indochina during the Indochina War. Promoted to colonel, he assumed command of the 3rd Foreign Infantry Regiment 3^{e} REI and participated to the Battle of Dien Bien Phu in 1954. He was responsible then for the support point "Isabelle". Lalande was captured after the fall of entrenched camp on May 7, 1954, and spent 5 months in captivity.

Thereafter, from 1955 to December 1958, he joined the French delegation to NATO in the U.S.

He participated then in the Algerian War, first as chef d'état-major of 19th Military Region in Algiers, then as chief of the sector of Tiaret from May 1958 to October 1960.

Promoted to général de brigade in 1961, he assumed command of the 1st intervention Brigade in Algeria and in Tunisia, where he participated in the battle of Bizerte.

After having occupied the post of commandant inspector of the French Army Light Aviation, he assumed command of the 11th Parachute Division 11^{e} DP at Pau.

In June 1966, he was promoted to général de division. In July of the next year, he assumed the functions of the Chief of the Military Staff of the President of the Republic. In 1969, he became the military governor of Lyon and commandant of the 5th Military Region. On March 1, 1970, he was promoted to the rank of général de corps d'armée.

== Decorations ==
- Grand Officer of the Légion d’Honneur
- Companion of the Liberation
- Grand Cross of the Ordre national du Mérite
- Croix de guerre 1939-1945 (2 citations)
- Croix de guerre des Théatres d'Opérations Extérieures
- Médaille Coloniale
- Norwegian War Cross with Sword

== Legacy ==
=== Homages ===
- The 183rd promotion (class) of Saint-Cyr (1996–1999) bears his name.
