= Cyrille Youchtchenko =

French Foreign Legion officer

Cyrille Youchtchenko is a Brigadier General and Commandant of the French Foreign Legion, appointed in July 2023.

== Career ==
He was born in 1967. In 1989 he entered the Saint-Cyr Military Academy. In 1992, he graduated as second lieutenant and was assigned as a platoon leader to the 92nd Infantry Regiment. With this unit, he deployed to Bosnia and Herzegovina during the Yugoslav Wars.
