= Pierre Langlais =

French general (1909–1986)

- Langlais in 1953
- Born: 2 December 1909; Pontivy, Morbihan
- Died: 17 July 1986 (aged 76); Vannes
- Military career
- Allegiance: France
- Branch: French Army
- Service years: 1930–1965
- Rank: Général de brigade
- Units: Compagnie Méharistes; Battalion of the 9th Colonial Infantry Division (9e DIC); 1st Colonial Half-Brigade Paratroop Commandos; 2nd Airborne Brigade (GAP2); 20th Airborne Brigade
- Conflicts: World War II: Italian Campaign; Liberation of France; Battle of the Colmar Pocket; First Indochina War: Battle of Hanoi; Operation Castor; Battle of Dien Bien Phu; Algerian War
- Awards: Grand Cross of the Légion d’honneur Croix de Guerre 1939–1945; Croix de guerre des TOE
- Other work: Author

Pierre Charles Albert Marie Langlais (2 December 1909 – 17 July 1986) was a senior French military officer who fought in World War II and the First Indochina War. Hailing from the Brittany region of France, Langlais was known as a tough and uncompromising character with an "unflagging devotion to his men."

After serving the majority of his career in France's North African colonies before the Second World War, Langlais became best known for his role in the Indochina War where he commanded paratroop forces and became the de facto commander of the French garrison in the midst of the Battle of Dien Bien Phu.

== Biography ==
=== Early life ===
Langlais was born at Pontivy, in Morbihan, Brittany. He attended St Cyr Military Academy and graduated in 1930. He chose to serve in the Compagnies Méharistes in North Africa patrolling the Sahara.

=== World War II ===
Langlais stayed in North Africa after the fall of France in 1940. Following the defeat of the Vichy French forces in Operation Torch, he joined the French Expeditionary Corps and saw action in Italy. He then passed into the French First Army under the command of General Jean de Lattre de Tassigny, seeing action in Alsace and Germany.

=== Indochina ===
Langlais arrived in Indochina as a Battalion Commander in the 9th Colonial Infantry Division (9e DIC) in October 1945. His battalion participated in the early battles of the First Indochina War, including the Battle of Hanoi in December 1946. Langlais distinguished himself as a promising young battalion commander in the bitter house-to-house fighting prevalent throughout this battle, which eventually resulted in the French reoccupation of Hanoi. Langlais returned to Indochina for a second two-year tour of duty in 1949. Assigned to the Chinese border area, he watched the defeat of the last remaining units of the Chinese Nationalist Army armies on the mainland. Langlais was then deployed to central Vietnam and northern Laos where he was involved in several difficult missions.

Returning to France, in October 1951 Langlais was given command of the 1st Colonial Para-Commando Demi Brigade (1 DBCCP), training replacements for Indochina. The unit was previously commanded by Jean Gilles, whom Langlais was close friends with. In order to take this assignment Langlais, who had only ever served in the Compagnies Méharistes or light infantry regiments, trained as a paratrooper.

Returning to Indochina in June 1953 for his third tour, Lt. Col. Langlais was given command of Groupement Aéroporté 2 (GAP 2), (Airborne Group 2), comprising:

- 1er Bataillon Etranger de Parachutistes (1 BEP) (Foreign Parachute Battalion)
- 8e Bataillon de Parachutistes de Choc (8 BPC) (Parachute Assault Battalion)
- 5e Bataillon de Parachutistes Vietnamiens (5 BPVN) (Vietnamese Parachute Battalion)

=== Dien Bien Phu ===
On 21 November 1953 Langlais and GAP 2 took part in Operation Castor, the seizing of the Dien Bien Phu valley. Langlais jumped with the men of the 1 BEP, but badly injured his ankle on landing and had to be evacuated to Hanoi the following day. Langlais returned to Dien Bien Phu with his foot in plaster on 12 December 1953 to take command of all airborne forces in the valley. He immediately joined GAP 2 in the field on an operation along the Pavie Track to relieve the garrison at Mường Pồn. The operation was a failure; GAP 2 was repeatedly ambushed along the Pavie Track and reached Muong Pon after the garrison had been overrun. The return to Dien Bien Phu was harassed by frequent Viet Minh ambushes and artillery fire. On 21 December GAP 2 launched another reconnaissance raid called Operation Regate to the Laotian town of Sop-Nao to link up with a Laotian-Moroccan-French force coming from Laos. The 50 miles (80 km) route was extremely difficult with mountainous terrain cut by deep ravines and numerous rivers. The link-up was achieved on 23 December and GAP 2 then returned via a different (and worse) route to Dien Bien Phu, arriving back in the valley on 26 December. Langlais' report on the operation left no doubt that long range offensive operations from Dien Bien Phu were not feasible.

Langlais' advice was ignored and offensive operations continued through January and into February 1954, although the tightening Viet Minh siege ring meant that raids were increasingly encountering Viet Minh forces within a few kilometres of the central position at Dien Bien Phu. On 17 February, faced with ongoing losses to the garrison, General René Cogny ordered that henceforth only light reconnaissances be conducted by limited numbers of personnel. On 11 March Langlais led GAP 2 on its last large reconnaissance operation against Viet Minh trenches being dug on Hill 555 overlooking Strongpoint Beatrice, only 3.2 km from the central position. The raid was a failure.

At 17:00 on 13 March 1954 Langlais was taking a shower when the Viet Minh artillery barrage that signalled the start of the battle began. Langlais ran to his command post and got in contact with his subordinate units. At 17:30 a shell hit Langlais' command post, burying the occupants under sand and timber; they had just dug themselves out when a second shell scored a direct hit, but it was a dud. At 19:50 Colonel de Castries phoned Langlais to inform him that Lieutenant Colonel Gaucher had been killed with his entire staff and that Langlais was now in command of the central sector.

As the French position in the valley came under increasing pressure, de Castries became withdrawn from the men under his command and began to rarely leave his underground headquarters. Langlais later bluntly commented on de Castries' limited role in the battle; saying "he transmitted our messages to Hanoi." Faced with this command vacuum, Bernard Fall reports that Langlais entered de Castries' headquarters on 24 March accompanied by the fully armed commanders of the paratroop battalions at Dien Bien Phu. De Castries' was then informed that while he would retain the appearance of command to the outside world, in reality the effective command of the fortress would be in Langlais' hands. The account of this "coup," however, is uncorroborated, and Martin Windrow, surveying the available primary sources, finds it more likely that the handing over of operational control to Langlais merely recognized the reality of the situation, and that Langlais had been making most of the key decisions in the defense for several weeks already.

=== Post-war career ===
Following his captivity as a Viet-Minh POW, Langlais returned to France but soon found himself in Algeria as the commander of an airborne brigade. Langlais commanded the 22e R.I.Ma during the Algerian War in the Maghnia region from 1955 to 1959. By 1966, Langlais had been promoted to brigadier general, and commanded the 20th Airborne Brigade at Pau, Pyrénées-Atlantiques.

=== Death ===
In 1986, in failing health and depressed, Langlais committed suicide by jumping from an apartment window in Vannes, 17 July.

== Works ==
Langlais wrote a book about his experience at Dien Bien Phu:

- Dien Bien Phu. Paris: Éditions France-Empire, 1963. 261 pp. Paris: Presses Pocket, 1969. 253 pp.
