= Colonial Medal =

Military decoration of France

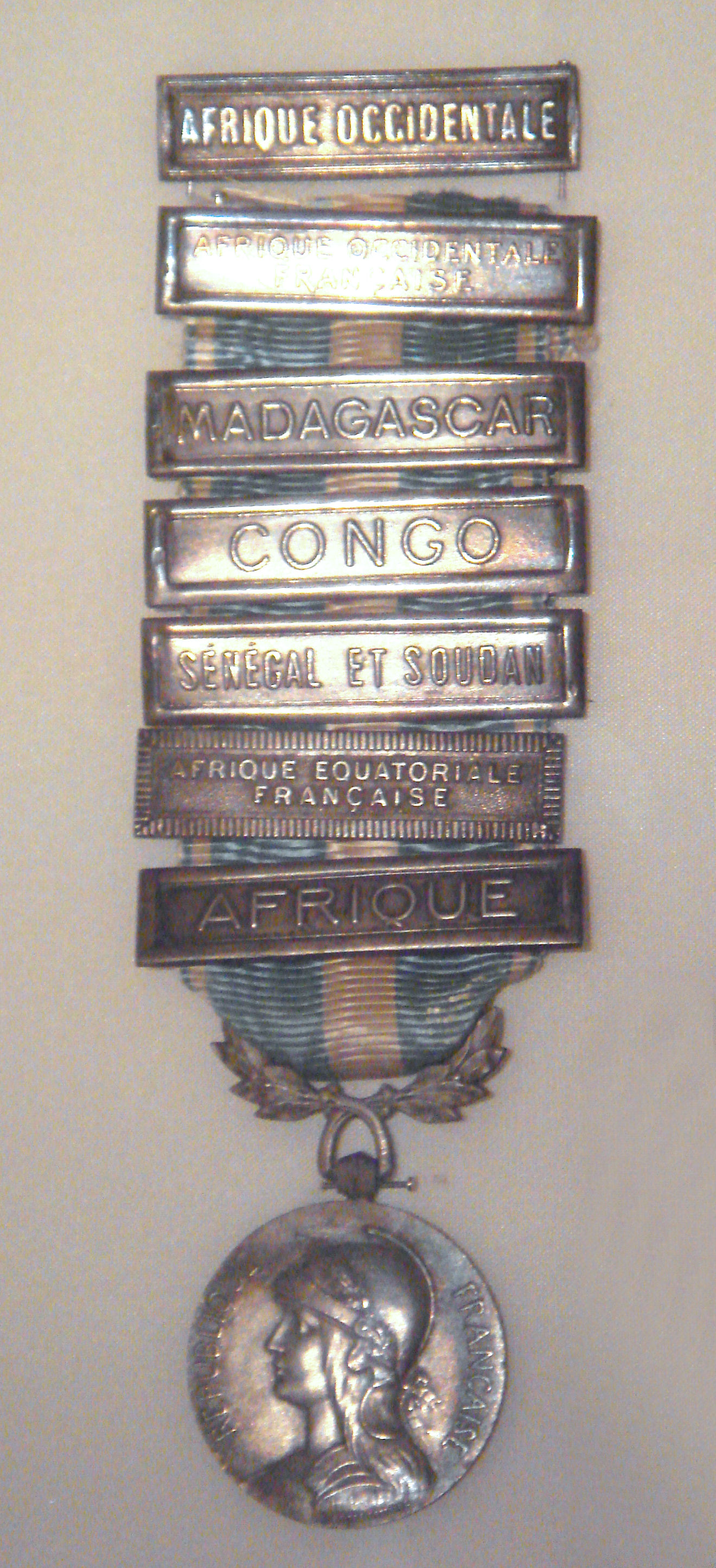
- French Colonial Medal with multiple clasps
- Type: Campaign Medal
- Awarded for: reward "the military services in the colonies, resulting from participation in military operations, in a colony or protectorate of any country.
- Presented by: France
- Status: No longer awarded, replaced by Médaille d'Outre-Mer
- Established: 23 July 1893
- Final award: 6 June 1962
- Ribbon of the Colonial Medal

Precedence
- Next (higher): Médaille commémorative de Madagascar (1883–1896)
- Next (lower): Médaille commémorative de l'expédition de Chine (1901)
- Related: Médaille d'Outre-Mer

The Colonial Medal (French: "Médaille Coloniale") was a French decoration created by the "loi de finances" of 26 July 1893 (article 75) to reward "military services in the colonies, resulting from participation in military operations, in a colony or a protectorate". A decree of 6 June 1962 changed the term "colonial" to "overseas" (see Overseas Medal).

== Medal ==
Introduced by the Finance Act of 23 July 1893, its implementing decree dated 6 March 1894 lists the military operations carried out by France in its colonies or protectorates (Algeria - Cochin - Gold Coast - Marquesas Islands - Nossi- Bé - New Caledonia - Senegal and Sudan - Society Islands - Tunisia). The scope of the decree was therefore a broad retroactive effect, since the first operations considered for the award of the Medal colonial dating back to 1827, at the very beginning of the conquest of Algeria.

Since then, numerous other regulations were made which amend or supplement the award of this medal. The most recent include the decree of June 6, 1962 which transformed the Médaille Coloniale to Médaille d'Outre-Mer.

The colonial medal is closely linked to the existence of the French colonial empire .

Article 4 of the Decree of 1894 establishes the design of the medal. The it is 30mm diameter in silver. On the obverse there is the helmeted effigy of the Republic with "République française" engraved above. On the reverse, a world map occupies the central field, resting on an anchor across a trophy of arms. The ribbon, is white and blue with vertical stripes. Its length can vary this from 35 to 37 mm.

The design of the medal is attributed to Capitaine de frégate Saulnier Pinellas, because the original award was for sailors. Its production had the distinction of being performed by the administration of the Paris Mint and a private company that was responsible for manufacturing the socket of the pendant ring leaves and clasps crimping indentations. The sets were to be delivered complete to the ministries of the Navy and War. The ribbon, the skewer assembly and assembly were also part of the supply.

The two departments then presented the medals to the recipients, with some delay as they were not always immediately available. The monopoly of the Paris Mint and the sluggishness of its administration thus created a boom for the private market, forcing the administration to allow the manufacture in "parallel" under the set forth specifications. Nevertheless, some marginal versions appeared.

In 1913, the Monnaie de Paris decided to fully bear the manufacture of the Colonial Medal. The second type sees its official medal redrawn and engraved by G. Lindauer. The engraving of Georges Lemaire is recessed so that the first official type, it was relief. The foliage becomes single-sided pendant ring and the sleeve is formed of two truncated cones. For a very short period Hinged clips are rounded instead of being indented. There were many contemporary manufacturers.

== Campaign Clasps ==
Campaign clasps which could be attached to medals awarded for service in overseas or colonial possessions include:

- Algeria
- Cochinchina
- Maroc
- Tonkin
- Gold Coast (Côte De L'or)
- Marquesas Islands (Îles Marquises)
- Nossi-Be
- New Caledonia (Nouvelle-Caledonie)
- Madagascar
- Senegal Sudan (Senegal-Soudan), created February 22, 1896
- Society Islands (Îles De La Socitie)
- French West Africa, created in 1900
- Tunisia (Tunisie)
- Sahara
- Bir-Hakiem, 1942
- Eritrea (Erythree)
- Ethiopia (Ethiopie)
- Fezzan
- Fezzan Tripolitania (Fezzan Tripolitanie)
- Kurfa (Koufra)
- Libya (Libye)
- Somalia (Somalie)
- Tunisia (Tunisie), 1942–1943
- Free French Africa
- Extrême-orient

== Recipients ==
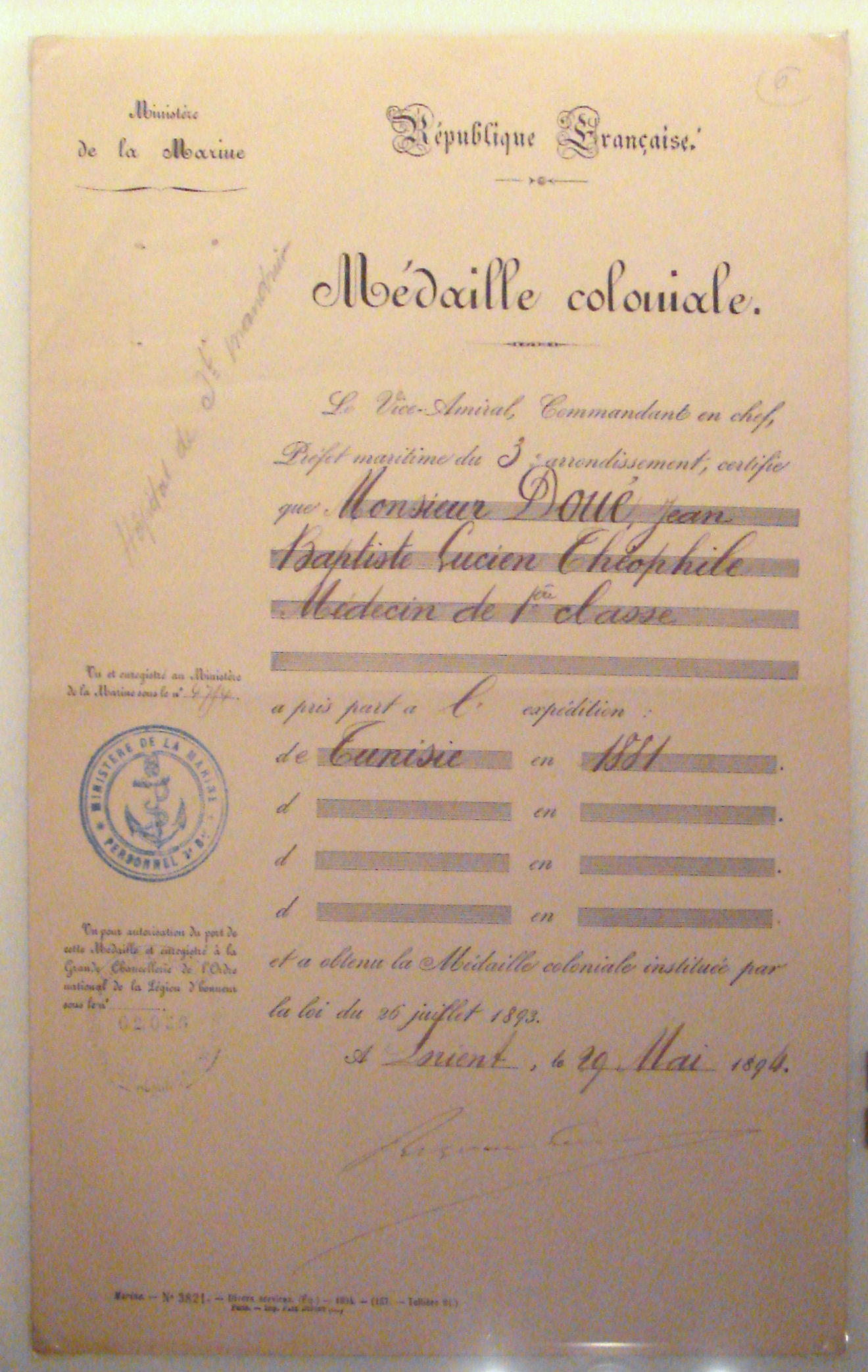
"Médaille Coloniale" certificate of 1894 for the participation in the 1881 French occupation of Tunisia of Military Doctor Jean-Baptiste Doué.

With campaign clasp, if applicable.

- Aarne Juutilainen (Morocco)
- Anton Docher
- Bernard Saint-Hillier (Eritrea, Libya, Bir Hakeim, Tunisia)
- Joseph de Goislard de Monsabert (Morocco)
- Pierre Jeanpierre
- Paul Arnaud de Foïard (Extrême-Orient)
- Jean Trescases (Extrême-Orient)
- Pierre Garbay (Morocco 1925, AFL, Eritrea, Libya, Tunisia)
- Louis Jules Trochu (Algeria)
- Philippe Leclerc de Hauteclocque (bars, unknown campaigns)
- Henri Gouraud (Senegal and Sudan, Morocco, Mauretania and Adrar)
- Charles Mangin (Senegal and Sudan)
- André Lalande
- Peter Julien Ortiz
- Gaston Palewski
- Philippe Ragueneau
- Louis Archinard (Sudan)
- Olivier Mazel (Tunisia)
- Joseph Vuillemin (Sahara, Africa)
- Célestin Hennion
- Pham Van Dong (Barrette Extrême Orient: for operations and campaigns in Tonkin)

== See also ==
- Ribbons of the French military and civil awards
