= 3rd Foreign Infantry Regiment =

- 3^{e} Régiment Étranger d'Infanterie
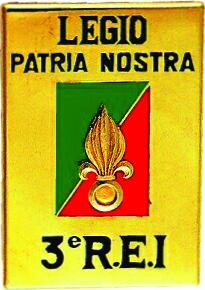
- Active: Marching Regiment of the Foreign Legion; 11 November 1915 – present
- Country: France
- Branch: French Army
- Type: Infantry
- Role: Secure border French Guiana/Brazil; Close-quarters combat; Counterinsurgency; Counter-narcotics; Jungle warfare; Raiding; Reconnaissance; Urban warfare
- Size: 675 men
- Garrison/HQ: Kourou, French Guiana
- Colors: Green and Red
- March: Anne-Marie du 3^{e} étranger
- Engagements: World War I; World War II; First Indochina War; Battle of Route Coloniale 4; Battle of Nà Sản; Battle of Dien Bien Phu; Algerian War; Global war on terrorism; Operation Titan

Commanders
- Current commander: Colonel Laparra
- Notable commanders: Paul-Frédéric Rollet; André Lalande; Antoine Mattei

Insignia
- Abbreviation: 3^{e} REI

The 3rd Foreign Infantry Regiment (French: 3^{e} Régiment Étranger d'Infanterie, 3^{e} REI) is an infantry regiment of the Foreign Legion in the French Army. The regiment is stationed in French Guiana. Its mission includes the protection of the Guiana Space Centre, a European Space Agency (ESA) facility.

== History, creation and different nominations ==
- On 11 November 1915 – the Marching Regiment of the Foreign Legion (R.M.L.E) was created from the veterans of the 2nd, 3rd, 4th Marching Regiments of the 1st Foreign Regiment, R.M.1^{er}R.E, (Marching Regiment of the 1st Foreign Regiment) and from the 2nd Marching Regiment of the 2nd Foreign Regiment 2^{e}R.M.2^{e}R.E (2nd Marching Regiment of the 2nd Foreign Regiment).
- On 15 November 1920 – the (R.M.L.E) was designated the 3rd Foreign Regiment, (3^{e}R.E).
- On 20 June 1922 – the 3rd Foreign Regiment became the 3rd Foreign Infantry Regiment (3^{e}R.E.I).
- On 5 December 1942 – a Foreign Legion and Colonial Infantry Demi-Brigade (D.B.I.C.L.E) was created from the 3rd Foreign Infantry Regiment (3^{e} R.E.I). On 15 December 1942, the Colonial Infantry Demi-Brigade became the 3rd Foreign Marching Infantry Regiment, 3^{e} Régiment étranger d'infanterie de marche (3^{e} R.E.I.M).
- On 1 July 1943 – the 3^{e} R.E.I.M became again the Marching Regiment of the Foreign Legion (R.M.L.E)
- On 1 July 1945 – at the end of the World War II, the R.M.L.E was redesignated as the 3^{e} R.E.I.
- On 1 April 1948 – a foreign parachute company was formed and designated as the Parachute Company of the 3rd Foreign Infantry Regiment, Para Co. 3^{e} R.E.I.

== Campaigns since 1915 ==
=== World War I (1914–1918) ===
The most decorated regiment in the Foreign Legion, the 3rd Foreign Infantry Regiment (3^{e} R.E.I) is heir to the Marching Regiment of the Foreign Legion (R.M.L.E) created in 1915. The R.M.L.E distinguished itself during the siege of de Belly-en-Santerre, on 4 July 1916; then found glory on 14 September 1918 during the piercing of the Hindenburg Line, under orders of regimental commander Lieutenant-Colonel Paul-Frédéric Rollet, the father of the Legion. With 9 citations earned at the orders of the armed forces during the World War I, the R.M.L.E obtained the double fourragère with ribbon colors of the Legion of Honour and the Croix de Guerre 1914–1918.

=== World War II (1939–1945) ===
The R.M.L.E was stationed in Morocco in 1920, where it was designated for the first time as the 3rd Foreign Infantry Regiment; the regiment subsequently took part in combat in the Rif and in various campaigns around the country. In 1943, the R.M.L.E was reformed and subsequently engaged in combat operations against the German forces at Mansour mountain, in Tunisia, before participating in the campaign of France from 1944 to 1945 within the ranks of the 5th Armored Division. Following these events, the regiment reached the Rhine, conquered Stuttgart, and made way to Austria during the moment of the armistice. With three new citations, the regiment obtained a fourragère with ribbon colors of the Croix de Guerre 1939–1945, materialized on the double fourragère obtained during the First World War. The R.M.L.E was also decorated with the U.S. "Distinguished Unit Citation" badge with the inscription "Rhine-Bavarian Alps".

The Legion recorded that 42,883 men served on the western front in the Marching Regiments of the 1st Foreign Regiment and 2nd Foreign Regiment of the R.M.L.E having suffered 5,172 killed and around 25,000 wounded or missing, a total of 70% casualties over the course of the war. At the end of the war, the Marching Regiment of the Foreign Legion, R.M.L.E was the second most decorated regiment in the French Army.

=== Vietnam and Algeria ===
Following World War II, the R.M.L.E returned to Morocco and was renamed the 3rd Foreign Infantry Regiment. Nevertheless, idle time was short term and the regiment was moved to Indochina as of December 1945. Subsequently, the regiment took positions around colonial routes 3 and 4. Ambushes, base and convoy attacks followed.

On April 1, 1948, the Parachute Company of the Regiment, Para Co. 3^{e} R.E.I, was established. Command of the company was entrusted to a young 23-year-old veteran, Legion lieutenant Jacques Morin from April 31, 1948, to May 31, 1949. Volunteers were drawn from the ranks from the foreign regiments present in already in Indochina. The Parachute Company operated under the operational missions of the 3rd Indochina Air Infantry Battalion of the 1st Parachute Chasseur Regiment, (III/1^{er} RCP).

The insignia of the Parachute Company of the 3rd Foreign Infantry Regiment was created in 1948 by the Jacques Morin. The combat company insignia represents an eastern dragon, winged and armed with a sword guarding the insignia of the 3rd Foreign Infantry Regiment at the center of legion colors.

Stationed at Hanoi, the parachute company took part in airborne operations. Following a series of brilliant combat action operations in the most exposed sectors of the high regions and airborne operations in the Delta, company was dissolved on May 31, 1949. At the time of disbandment, the company counted: 3 Legion officers, 14 Sous-officiers, 92 Legion corporals and Legionnaires, all of whom were transferred to the first formation of the 1st Foreign Parachute Battalion, (1^{er} BEP, I Formation) which just disembarked in Indochina.

When combat intensified, on 25 July 1948, the battle of Phu Tong Hoa took place. A company of 3 REI led by Captain Cardinal resisted heroically and held the line for 9 hours against non-stop assaults of the Viet Minh. In 1950, chef de battalion commander Forget and the entire 3rd battalion was destroyed (either killed, or missing, with 140 captured and only 12 survivors) at Cao Bằng on route colonial 4 in a traditional Foreign Legion battlefield. Nevertheless, the regiment was still engaged in combat at Đông Khê, Bac Khan and Điện Biên Phủ in 1954. The regiment had already lost the equivalent of five battalions in Indochina. With four new citations, the 3rd Foreign Infantry Regiment obtained a fourragère with ribbon colors of the Médaille militaire, and with colors of the ribbon of the croix de guerre des théâtres d'opérations extérieures. In the Indochina campaign, the regiment had lost 77 officers, 364 NCOs, 3,396 other ranks: a total of 3,837 Legionnaires.

In December 1954, the regiment disembarked at Bône in Algeria. The regiment was put in charge of the difficult sector of Aures Nementchas. Following the departure of the 3rd battalion for Madagascar, in 1957, the regiment intervened specially in the north and along the Tunisian dam. In 1962, the regiment was based in Madagascar, at Diego Suarez, where its members adapted to the tropical surroundings.

=== 1973–present ===
On 11 September 1973, the 3rd Foreign Infantry Regiment garrisoned at Kourou in French Guiana. In a fast tempo, the regiment marked the territory, took charge and pierced the route towards the east which is supposed to link Cayenne to the Brazilian frontier while investing time operations around the Guiana Space Centre, planetary mission accomplishments for which the regiment received the vermeil medal from the National Centre for Space Studies, C.N.E.S.

The Jungle Training Center, (C.E.F.E) saw daylight in 1986 at Régina, near the Approuague, which became the French reference in material of survival and jungle tropical forest combats. 35,000 jungle-brevets were issued by the C.E.F.E since creation in 1986.

The organization of the regiment witnessed several modifications during that time. In 1986, the equipment and materials company was dissolved and replaced by a reconnaissance company. In 1998, the 3rd combat company was replaced by a rotating combat company, also dissolved in 2003 for two proterre units, before being recreated permanently in 2010, in order to give way in response to the various accelerations of mission rhythms.

In 2004, the 3rd Foreign Infantry Regiment engaged in Operation Carbet (French: Opération Carbet), in Haiti. In 2008, the president of the republic launched Operation Harpie (French: Opération Harpie), with point to combat illegal activities in deep jungle (mainly illegal gold-mining activities). This mission became permanent and was also reinforced in 2010. The regiment was mainly in charge of sector Oyapock, at the Brazilian frontier, while supporting forces of the gendarmerie. At end of 2011, while the Ensemble de Lancement Soyouz became operational, the Regiment ensured protection around the area.

3rd Foreign Infantry Regiment (1915–present)

Since creation of the 3rd Foreign Infantry Regiment, 7216 Legionnaires have died for France. In 2013, the regiment celebrated the passing of 40 years in French Guiana, where 50 legionnaires have thus far died.

== Missions ==
Operation Titan

The mission of the regiment revolves around the protection of the Guiana Space Centre (French: Centre Spatial Guyanais, CSG). Prior and before each space launch, under a prefectoral requisition at the corps of an inter-armed contingent, the 3rd Foreign Infantry Regiment conducts search reconnaissance patrols in the exterior zones around the launching area in order to prevent any compromising intrusion. Each planetary space launch requires the prevention deployment of 2-3 combat companies. Simultaneously, the regiment also ensures the defense of the sensitive installations in relation to the launch site towards low altitude aerial threats by the CA (Compagnie d'Appui). At the end of 2011, the Guiana Space Center integrated the Soyouz and Vega launchers, during which the 3rd Foreign Infantry Regiment would ensure the usual front line surrounding protection.

Operation Harpie

Initiated in 2008 and reinforced in 2010, Harpie is an inter-ministerial operation aimed at fighting illegal clandestine mining activities. The 3rd Foreign Infantry Regiment, intervened under prefectoral requisition in support of forces of the gendarmerie. Launching operations from Saint-Georges and Camopi on the Oyapock river, combat sections conduct jungle patrol warfare operations lasting from a couple of days to a couple of weeks. These jungle operations require specific operational preparations and perfect know-how and knowledge of the equatorial jungle forests.

Jungle Combat Training

Centre d'entraînement en forêt équatoriale (CEFE)

Situated in Regina, on the shores of the Approuague, in a jungle environment, the Jungle Training Center (French: Centre d'entraînement en forêt équatoriale, CEFE) is the French reference center for equatorial forest domain training and expertise, and one of the 4 "jungle instruction centers" internationally recognized. The mission of the CEFE is to train, teach, and ensure combat readiness of French and foreign units in all matters related to combat operations in a jungle environment. The CEFE is renowned around the world for being equipped with highly qualified if not the best jungle warfare senior instructors and aid-moniteur in the world. Created in 1986, the CEFE graduates around 1800 soldiers per year (French: brevet-badges).

A Regional Sea Continental Operational Force

The 3rd Foreign Infantry Regiment is projected in the Caribbean South America. The regiment is a prepositioned operational force capable of intervention at any moment in the Caribbean South America zone, such as in 2004 during Operation Carbet in Haïti.

== Organization ==
The regiment is composed of around 675 men organised into 5 companies.

- Pionniers de la Légion étrangère
- Compagnie de Commandement et de Soutien (CCS) – Command and Support Company (mixed regular / 4 month tours) including the SAED (Section d'Aide à l'Engagement Débarqué – the Regiment's recon platoon, all regular)
- 2^{e} compagnie (2^{e} Cie) – 2nd Infantry Company (an administration and logistic platoon, 3 combat platoons and a support platoon)
- 3^{e} Compagnie (3^{e} Cie) – 3rd Infantry Company (an administration and logistic platoon, 3 combat platoons and a support platoon) (replaced between 1998 and 2010 by a 4-month-tour unit, re-created as regular in 2010)
- Compagnie d'appui (CA) – Support Company (air defense) (on 4-month tours, an administration and logistic platoon, 2 SHORAD platoons)
- Compagnie de Réserve (4^{e} Cie) – Reserve Company (formed in 2010)

== Traditions ==
=== Insignia ===
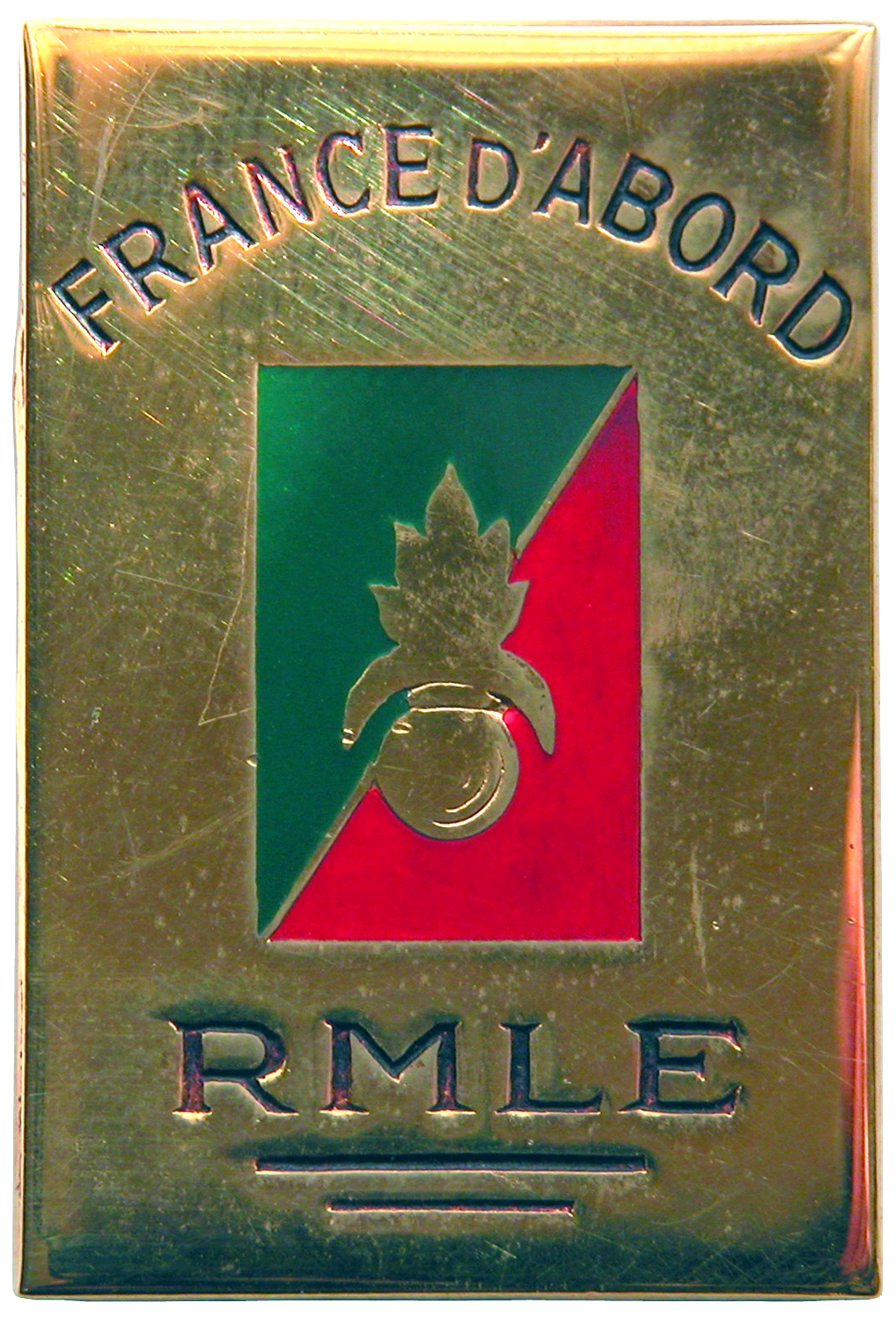
Insignia of the Marching Regiment of the Foreign Legion, R.M.L.E

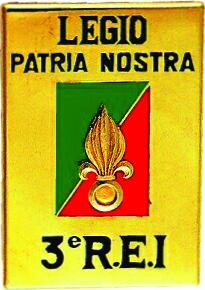
Regimental Insignia of the 3^{e} REI

=== Regimental song ===
Chant de Marche : Anne-Marie du 3^{e} REI lyrics in German:

Mein Regiment, mein Heimatland
Meine Mutter hab' ich nie gekannt
Mein Vater starb schon früh im Feld, ja Feld
Ich bin allein auf dieser Welt. (bis)

Anne-Marie, das ist mein Nam'
Den ich vom Regiment bekam
Mein ganzes Leben lasse ich, ja ich
Fur's Bataillon da sterbe ich. (bis)

Wenn's Regiment früh ausmarschiert
Der Tambur seine Trommel rührt
Tausch ich mit keiner Fürstin nicht, ja nicht
Sie lebt nicht glücklicher als ich. (bis)

Ein Offizier den mag ich nicht
Weil er den Mädchen viel verspricht
Ein Legionär nur soll es sein, ja sein
Ihm schenke ich mein Herz allein. (bis)

Refrain
Mein Name ist Anne-Marie
Ein jeder kennt mich schon
Ich bin ja die Tochter vom ganzen
Bataillon

=== Honours ===
==== Battle honours ====
- Cameróne 1863
- Artois 1915
- Champagne 1915
- Bataille de la Somme 1916
- Les Monts de Verdun 1917
- Picardie-Soissonnais 1918
- Vauxaillon 1918
- Maroc 1921–1934
- Djebel Mansour 1943
- Alsace 1944–1945
- Stuttgart 1945
- Indochine 1946–1954
- AFN 1952–1962

=== Decorations ===
The 3rd Foreign Infantry Regiment, continuing the traditions and being the former Marching Regiment of the Foreign Legion is one of the most decorated regiments in France, the most decorated Regiment of France, along with the Marine Tank Infantry Regiment (RICM).

Regimental colors of the 3^{e} REI are decorated with:

- Knight Cross of the Legion of Honour
- Médaille militaire
- Croix de Guerre 1914–1918 with 9 palms, allowing the double fourragère in colours of Légion d'honneur and croix de guerre.
- Croix de Guerre 1939–1945 with 3 palms, allowing the 1939–1945 olive on the aforementioned fourragère.
- Croix de Guerre théâtre d'opérations extérieures with 5 palms, allowing the fourragère in colours of médaille militaire with the TOE olive.
- Mérite militaire chérifien (Morocco)
- Ordem Militar da Torre e Espada (Order of the Tower and Sword – Portugal)
- Medalla dels voluntaris catalans (Catalonia)
- Presidential Unit Citation with RHINE-BAVARIAN ALPS conferred 6 May 1946 by the United States.
- Médaille de vermeil of the National Centre for Space Studies of Kourou conferred for the first to a military unit.
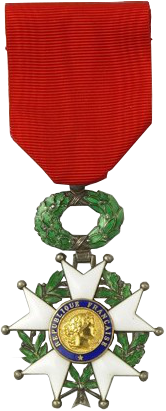
Knight Cross of the Legion of Honneur

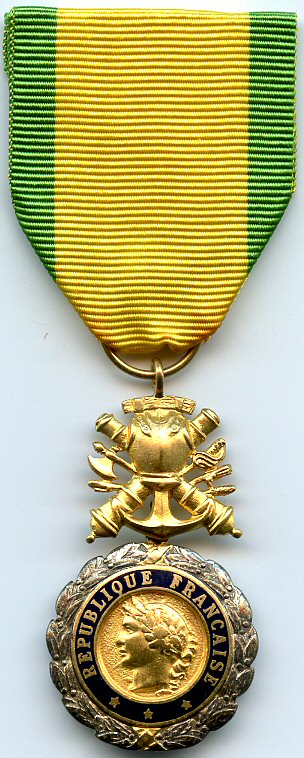
Médaille militaire

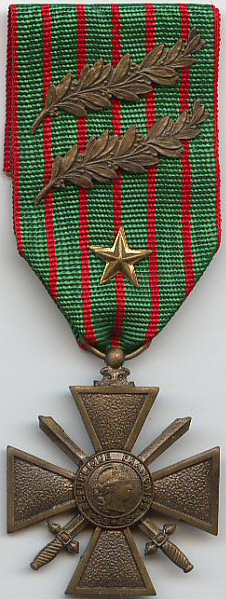
Croix de Guerre 1914–1918 with 9 palms

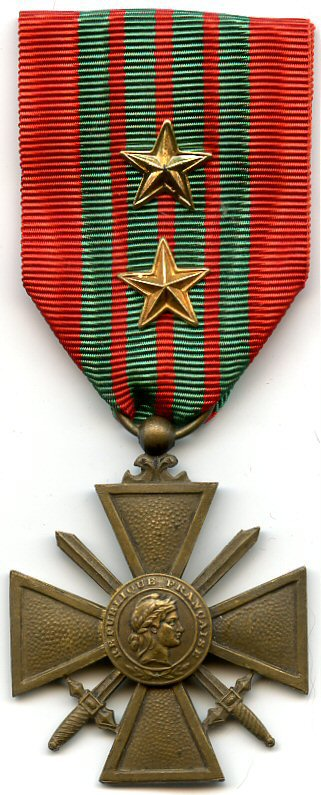
Croix de Guerre 1939–1945 with 3 palms

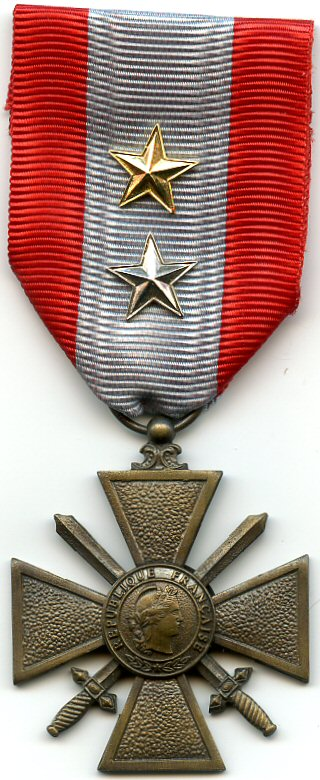
Croix de Guerre TOE with 5 palms

Portuguese Order of the Tower and Sword

United States Army Distinguished Unit Citation RHINE-BAVARIAN ALPS

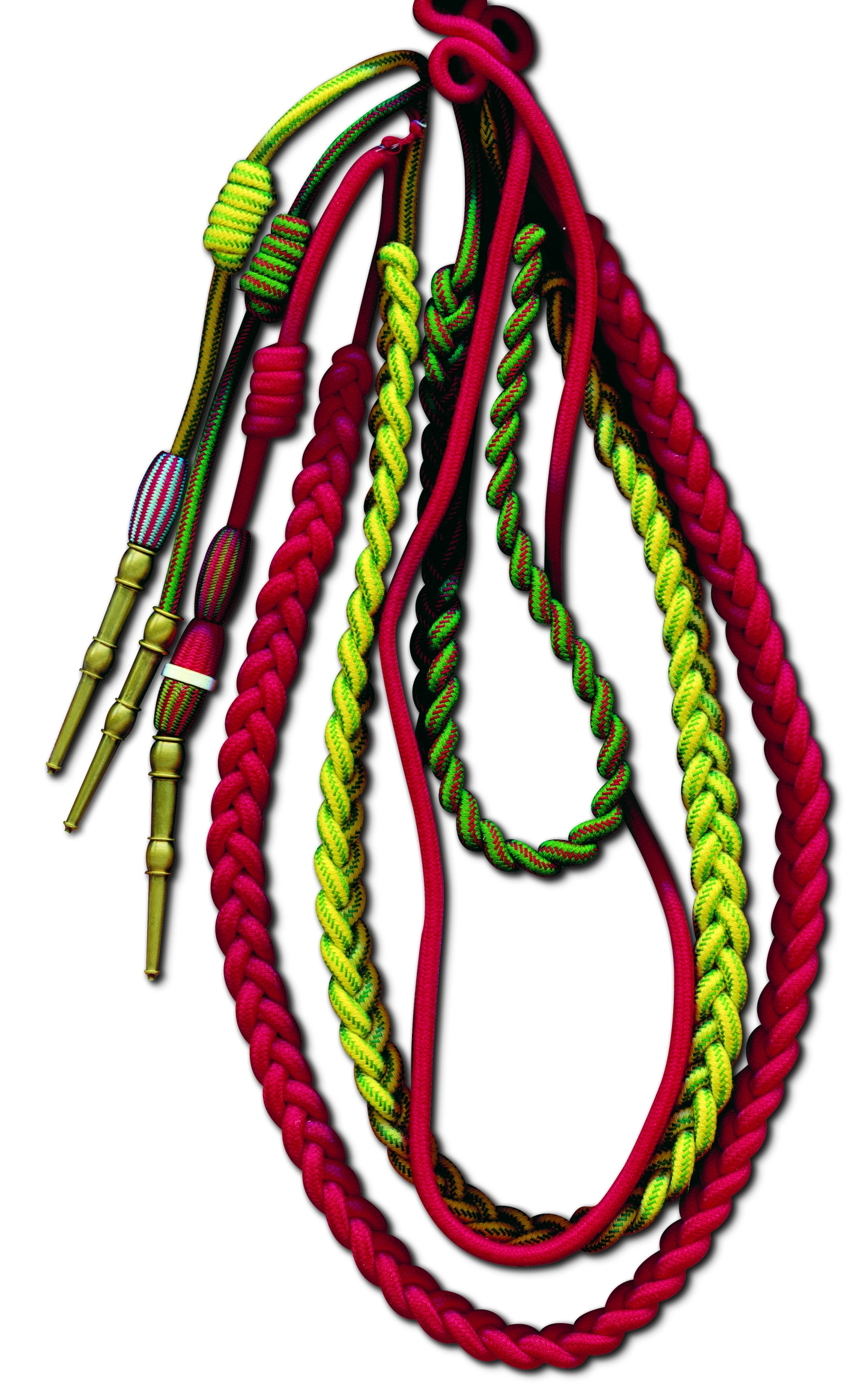
Fourragère of the 3^{e} REI

=== Honorary Regimental Arms Celebration ===
The annual celebration day of inheritance for the 3rd Foreign Infantry Regiment is the piercing of the Hindenburg Line on 14 September 1918 by the Marching Regiment of the Foreign Legion.

== Regimental Commanders ==
Period 1915 -1920 : Marching Regiment of the Foreign Legion
Marching Regiment of the Foreign Legion (R.M.L.E)

Period 1920–1943 : 3rd Foreign Infantry Regiment 3^{e} Régiment étranger d'Infanterie

- 1920 : lieutenant-colonel Rollet
- 1925 : lieutenant-colonel François
- 1926 : lieutenant-colonel Blanc
- 1928 : colonel Michet de La Baume
- 1932 : colonel Brillat-Savarin
- 1936 : colonel Mantoz
- 1939 : colonel Lales
- 1941 : colonel Levêque
- 1942 : lieutenant-colonel Lambert (3^{e} R.E.I.M)

Period 1943 -1945 : Marching Regiment of the Foreign Legion
Marching Regiment of the Foreign Legion (R.M.L.E)

3rd Foreign Infantry Regiment
3^{e} Régiment étranger d'Infanterie(3^{e} R.E.I)

- 1945 : lieutenant-colonel Clément
- 1945 : colonel Lehur
- 1947 : lieutenant-colonel Méric
- 1947 : lieutenant-colonel Royer
- 1948 : lieutenant-colonel Simon
- 1949 : colonel Constans
- 1950 : lieutenant-colonel Jacquot
- 1951 : colonel Laimay
- 1953 : colonel Marguet
- 1953 : lieutenant-colonel de Bruc de Montplaisir
- 1953 : colonel André Lalande
- 1954 : colonel Raberin
- 1955 : colonel Thomas
- 1956 : colonel Gaume
- 1958 : colonel de Corta
- 1960 : lieutenant-colonel Torquat de La Coulerie
- 1960 : colonel Langlois
- 1962 : lieutenant-colonel Antoine Mattei
- 1964 : lieutenant-colonel Iacconi
- 1966 : colonel Letestu
- 1969 : colonel Bramoullé
- 1971 : colonel Charles-Dominé
- 1973 : colonel Billot
- 1975 : colonel Grosjean
- 1977 : colonel Girard
- 1979 : colonel Fouques-Duparc
- 1981 : colonel Gosset
- 1983 : colonel Guillot
- 1985 : colonel Christian Piquemal
- 1987 : lieutenant-colonel Tresti
- 1989 : colonel Dubos
- 1991 : colonel Théry
- 1993 : colonel Serveille
- 1995 : colonel Lalanne-Berdouticq
- 1997 : colonel Houdet
- 1999 : lieutenant-colonel de Guillebon
- 2001 : lieutenant-colonel de Stabenrath
- 2003 : colonel Vincent Le Cour-Grandmaison
- 2005 : colonel Gomart
- 2007 : colonel Guyot
- 2009 : colonel de Bourdoncle de Saint-Salvy
- 2011 : colonel Lardet
- 2013 : colonel Walter
- 2015 : colonel Ransan
- 2017 : colonel Laparra

== See also ==
- French Foreign Legion Music Band (MLE)
- List of French Foreign Legion units
- Major (France)
- Moroccan Division
