= Jacques Morin =

- Born: 7 November 1924; France
- Died: 31 May 1995 (aged 70)
- Military career
- Allegiance: France
- Branch: French Army; Foreign Legion
- Service years: 1942 - 1968
- Commands: Parachute Company of the 3rd Foreign Infantry Regiment; Para Co. 3^{e} REI; 1st Foreign Parachute Regiment; 1^{er} REP; 10th Parachute Division; 10^{e} DP
- Conflicts: World War II; Indochina War

Jacques Morin (1924-1995) was a French officer and company commander of the Parachute Company of the 3rd Foreign Infantry Regiment.

== Military career ==
In 1941, Jacques obtained the second part of his baccalaureate, at the Jesuits (French: Les Jésuites) of Saint-Genevieve.

At his sortie, he subscribed for 8 years at the ESM of Saint-Cyr (French: Saint-Cyr), which he joined at Aix-en-Provence where he was garrisoned in the Free Zone, on 15 October 1942. On 27 November the Italians and Germans encircled the school and demanded access to the arms depot. They put the student candidates on leave. A ceremony of offering birds was put into effect and it was in front of the enemy that Jacques Morin revealed his officer capability with only 2 months of school. Saint-Cyr was closed on 6 December 1942. The students were sent to the youth fields or had the option to enlist in a faculty in the capital. He was placed on armistice leave on 1 March 1943. After three attempts to join North Africa by Switzerland or Spain, he subscribed at the Oriental language school at Paris and conducted several visits to the Maquis where he became an instructor with the rank of a Caporal-chef (Senior Corporal) on 1 June 1943. In March 1944, he left this Maquis group to join a clandestine group of Saint-Cyr, at another Maquis (French: Les Maquis) group at the corps of the resistance army organization (ORA). Denounced as a traitor, he was taken by the Germans on 7 June 1944. Interrogated at Fresnes, he was deported on August 15, to the Laura commando of the Buchenwald camp. With the Allies advancement, the commando was moved to Allach near Dachau. Liberated by the Americans (U.S.), on 30 April 1945, he remained in wait at the sanitary evaluation at the camp, where he escaped with the aid of a woman of the social services unit of the navy (French: La Marine) and a sailor (French: matelot), a former secretary of his uncle, a Submariner (French: Sous-mariniers) at Casablanca. He was brought back to France in an armored vehicle of Hitler, accompanied by and bringing back with him an Admiral (French: Amiral), incoming for inspection. He was placed on convalescence leave and assigned to CHR of the COI 113.

A decree of 2 July 1945 nominated him to the rank of Sous-lieutenant as of 1 October 1943. He accordingly spent a brief tour at the Ruchard camp where, by another decree of 11 November 1945, he was promoted to the rank of Lieutenant as of 25 December 1944. He was cited at the orders of the armed forces with Croix de guerre 1939-1945, for his liaison actions at the corps of the ORA and his deportation.

He rejoined the promotion « Victoire », at EMIA de Coetquidan, on 9 March 1946. Following the infantry application school and a drill series round at Pau, on 8 April 1947, he selected the Legion.

He arrived to the DCRE at Sidi bel-Abbes on 15 April, to be assigned to the first passing company. He then assumed the provisionary command of the depot company on 21 May 1947.

Designated in reinforcement in the Far East (French: Extrême-Orient), he disembarked at Saigon to serve in the II/3rd Foreign Infantry Regiment 3^{e} REI on 7 December 1947. Commanding a post in the bushes near RC4, he was called upon by colonel Simon, regimental commander of the 3rd Foreign Infantry Regiment 3^{e} REI to assume command of a parachute company in course of being created as of 1 April 1948. During this affectation, he was wounded by bullet in the right thigh and obtained 3 citations. On 1 June 1949 his unit was dissolved and integrated the 1st Foreign Parachute Battalion 1^{er} BEP, created in Algeria and which just arrived in Indochina. Adjoint (French: assistant) to the commandant and intelligence officer, he obtained another citation.

Repatriated by the end of tour, he was assigned to CAR 8 to benefit from his leave of campaign tour end.

On 1 July he was promoted to the rank of Captain. Following the CFC, he was assigned to the 3rd Foreign Parachute Battalion 3^{E} BEP at Sétif, which he joined on 20 October 1950.

Designated for a second deployment in Indochina, he disembarked at Saigon on 13 March 1951 and met with the 1st Foreign Parachute Battalion 1^{er} BEP which was filling ranks after being annihilated. Cited again, he was awarded 4 Croix de guerre des théâtres d'opérations extérieures and the Chevalier of the Legion of Honour.

Repatriated by the end of tour, he disembarked at Marseille and CAR 3 filled his leave of campaign tour end on 19 June 1953.

Resuming service on 1 September 1953 saw him assigned to the 18th Colonial Infantry Parachute Regiment 18^{e} RIPC at Pau. He was designated accordingly as an instructor at the infantry application school of Saint-Maixent, which he joined on 15 September 1954.

He met with the 1st Foreign Parachute Regiment 1^{er} REP at Zeralda and assumed the function of superior assistant officer (designated as general staff headquarters at the époque) on 1 August 1956. He was decorated with the rosette of the Officier of the Legion of Honour in August 1956.

The Suez operation was his first intervention on African soil (French: Terre Africaine), then under the orders of lieutenant-colonels Brothier and Jeanpierre, he participated to all the operations of the unit, including in the territories South towards Touggout and Laghouat. Promoted to Chef de bataillon (Commandant - Major) on 31 March 1958, he assumed the provisionary command of the 1st Foreign Parachute Regiment 1^{er} REP following the death of their regimental commander, lieutenant-colonel Pierre Jeanpierre on 5 July 1958. In North Africa (AFN), he was cited at the orders of the brigade and 5 times and the orders of the armed forces. He was promoted to the rank of Commandeur of the Legion of Honour in September 1958.

In September 1959, he commanded the 2nd battalion of the EOA at ESMIA de Coetquidan then in 1960, he was assigned to the general staff headquarters of the 10th Parachute Division 10^{e} DP in quality as chief of the general staff of the division. Following an indifference with general Saint-Hillier, he was assigned to metropolis, at the technical inspection of the TAP, on 1 April 1961, just before the genera's putsch.

Physically marked by his diseases contracted in deportation or in Indochina, marked morally with the 1961 affairs of Algeria, he benefited from a long leave. He was then put at disposition then reintegrated. He resumed service at the military subdivision of Paris in 1966 and the 64th Military Division at Dijon in 1967.

He was admitted to his rights for retirement after 25 years of service on 21 March 1968.

In 1970, he was elevated to the dignity of Grand Officier of the Legion of Honour.

In 1983, the Legion honored him for the commemoration of the 120th year anniversary of Camerone, where he was the ceremonial chief.

In 1997, a promotion of Saint-Cyr adopted him as their patron.

Jacques Morin died on 31 May 1995.

== Recognitions and Honors ==

- Grand Officier of the Légion d'Honneur
- Commandeur of the Légion d'Honneur
- Officier of the Légion d'Honneur
- Chevalier of the Légion d'Honneur
- Croix de guerre 1939-1945
- Croix de guerre des théâtres d'opérations extérieures (x4)
- Cited at the orders of the Brigade in North Africa (AFN) and 5 times at the orders of the armed forces

== See also ==
- Major (France)
- French Foreign Legion Music Band (MLE)
