= Lieutenant-General (France) =

French Military title

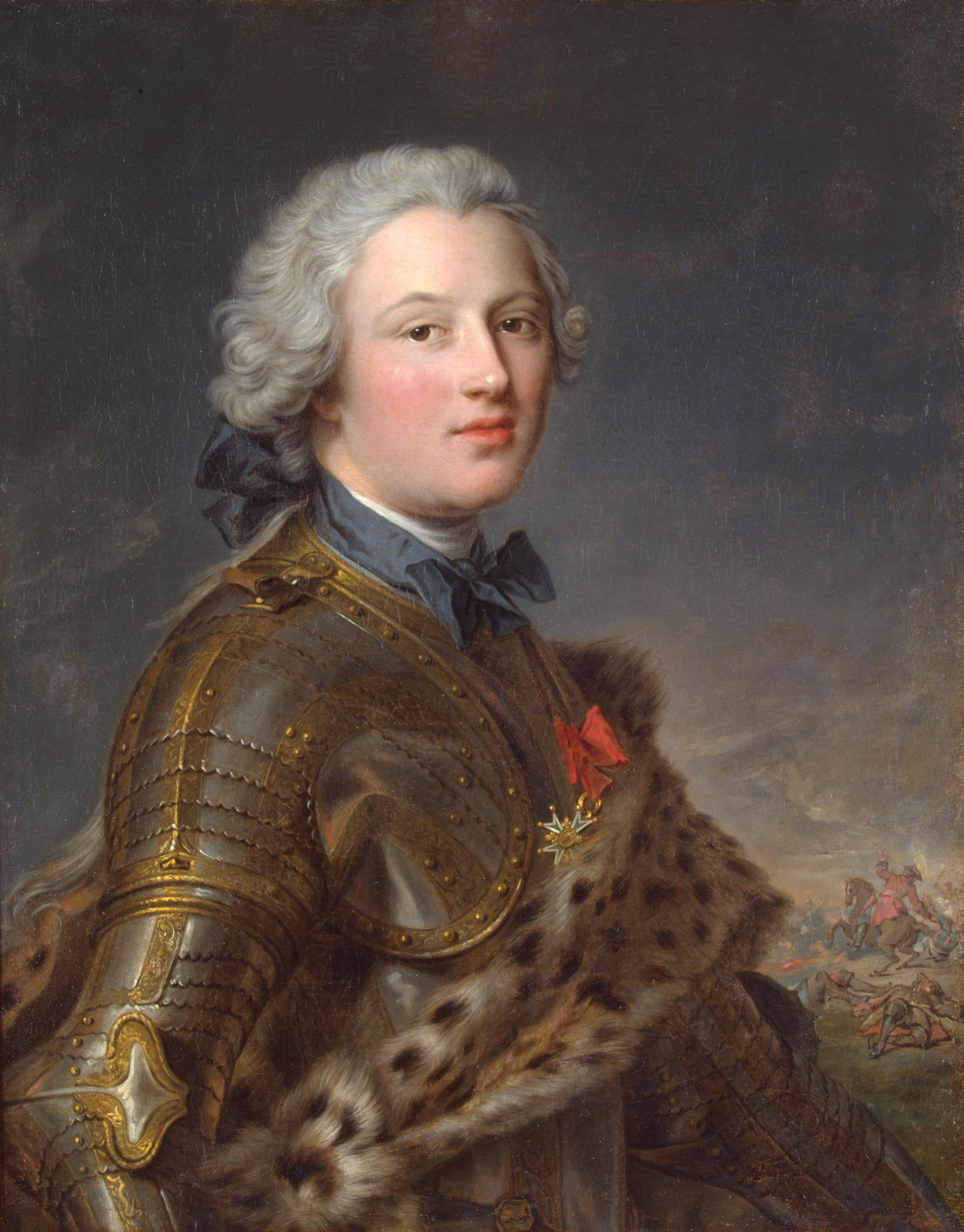
Pierre Victor, baron de Besenval de Brünstatt, who was promoted to Lieutenant-General in 1762.

Lieutenant-General (French: Lieutenant-Général) was a title and rank in France across various military and security institutions with history dating back well beyond the 18th century. The official historic succession of the "Lieutenant-Général of France" corresponded to divisional general for the French Army and vice admiral for the French Navy.

While the French Navy's equivalent of a lieutenant general is a vice admiral, the equivalent of today's Lieutenant-Général in the French Armed Forces would be partially that of army corps general (French: Général de corps d'armée), such was due to the fact that the concept of an army corps (French: Corps d'Armée) wasn't adopted first until 19 November 1873, by a Presidential Decree, and the actual rank of army corps general was not officially formed until a Law Decree on 6 June 1939.

For the French Army and Navy of the ancien régime, the rank corresponded to lieutenant général des armées ("lieutenant general of the armies") for the Army and lieutenant général des armées navales ("lieutenant general of the naval armies") for the Navy. Originally, two positions were created, one for the Levant Fleet in 1652 and one for the Ponant Fleet in 1654.

== History of the rank in France ==
In France, under the Ancien Régime, the Restoration (French: restauration) and July Monarchy, several officers carried the title of Lieutenant-General (French: Lieutenant-Général). Within a general context, the title designated the individual who was delegated all the powers of authority on behalf of the person who he was supposed to replace.

=== Province Lieutenant-General ===
The Province Lieutenant-General (French: Lieutenant-Général de Province) was a personage, often issued from high aristocracy, and who represented the King in the provinces of the Kingdom. His role was theoretically resumed to the assurance locum status of the Governor. Accordingly, the Kings would hope that their influence would get neutralized simultaneously, preventing any sort of tentative revolt. The charge function of the lieutenant-general became in the 17th century and specially in the 18th century, purely an honorific title: The individual bearing this title would reside in the Cour de France (French: Cour de France) and would contempt to earn income without actual real work. In addition, the Kings had the tendency to nominate the sons which were heir to their fathers, a hereditary system which made the offices of the lieutenant-general strictly part of the patrimony of aristocratic families.

One should not mix the office of the lieutenant-general with that of the Lieutenant of the King (French: Lieutenant du Roi). The Lieutenant of the King was subordinated to the Lieutenant-General and his role (within a similar framework: represented the King in the provinces) was only upheld with very limited functions.

=== Lieutenant-General Bailliage ===
The Lieutenant-General Baillage (Baillage (French: bailliage) or Sénéchaussée (French: sénéchaussée) - Bailliage : designated both a territorial entity (administrative, financial or legal circumscription) and the charge officer of that function, designated as Bailli) was the name which referred to the Grand-Judge (French: Juge-Mage), charged with replacing temporarily the Bailli (French: bailli) and Sénéchal (French: Sénéchal) in relation to legal cases.

=== Lieutenant-General of the Police ===
The title of Lieutenant-General of the Police (French: lieutenant-général de police) under the Ancien Régime was established in 1667, at Paris, to assure and maintain order. As of 1699, other Police Lieutenant-Generals were established in other grand cities in France.

=== Lieutenant-General of the Kingdom ===
The title of Lieutenant-General of the Kingdom referred to a temporary function which the Kings, in circumstances of crises, invested all their power in them to exercise their will or part of their royal authority. Charged with this function were:

- Charles V of France, from 1356 to 1358 during the captivity of his father John II of France in England,
- Jean, Count of Tancarville, from April 24, 1361 after the captivity of his friend John II of France in England,
- Charles VII of France, in 1417 was nominated to Lieutenant-General of the Kingdom at age 14, to replace his father King Charles VI of France who became Mad,
- Charles de Melun, Grand Master of France who filled the function of the Constable of France, decapitated on the place of Marché in Petit-Andely on 20 August 1468,
- Francis, Duke of Guise from 1558 to 1560,
- Henry III of France in 1567,
- Charles, Duke of Mayenne in 1589,
- Cardinal Armand Jean du Plessis, Duke of Richelieu and Fronsac in 1629,
- Joseph Bonaparte, Lieutenant-General of the Empire in 1814,
- Charles, Count of Artois in 1814,
- Louis Philippe, Duke of Orléans on 31 July 1830, who assumed the regency from 2 August, before being proclaimed King of the French under the name of Louis Philippe I on 9 August 1830.

=== Lieutenant-General of the Armies ===
The rank of Lieutenant-General of the Armies for the Army, and Lieutenant-General of the Naval Armies for the French Navy, was an elevated rank in the military hierarchy of the Ancien Régime, inaccessible to a commoner. It was junior only to the Marshals of France (French: maréchaux) and Colonel-Generals of France (French: colonels généraux), for the French Army, and the Admirals of France (French: amiraux de France) and Vice-Admirals of France (French: vice-amiraux de France), for the Navy, not titles of military rank (French: grade militaire), but Great Officers of the Crown of France (French: grand office de la couronne de France), a dignity both honorific and lucrative. The rank of Lieutenant-General of France was the succeeding equivalent rank of a général de division and the Lieutenant-General of the Naval Armies the succeeding equivalent of a Vice-Admiral of the actual époque.

The ranks of Lieutenant-General of the Armies were renamed as Général de Division and Vice-Amiral (Vice-Admiral) in 1791. In 1814, the rank of Général de division was renamed as Lieutenant-General of the Armies, before definitely being referred to as Général officer corps in 1848. The rank of Général de corps d'armée wasn't officially adopted until 1939, along with 5 other French Armed Forces ranks which included 1 Général d'armée rank, 2 Aerial general officer ranks of the French Air Force and 2 Admiral ranks of the French Navy.

== See also ==
- Governor (Les Invalides, France)
- Major (France)
- Ranks in the French Army
- Ranks in the French Navy
- Ranks in the National Gendarmerie
- Ranks in the French Air Force
- Ranks in the National Police

== Sources and references ==
Notes

Citations

References

- Jean-Luc Messager, La Légion étrangère 175 ans d'histoire (The French Foreign Legion 175 years of History), édition EPA Hachette livre, 2007
- Vergé-Franceschi, Michel (2002). Dictionnaire d'Histoire maritime. Paris: Robert Laffont. ISBN 2-221-08751-8.
