= André Lanata =

French general (born 1961)

André Lanata

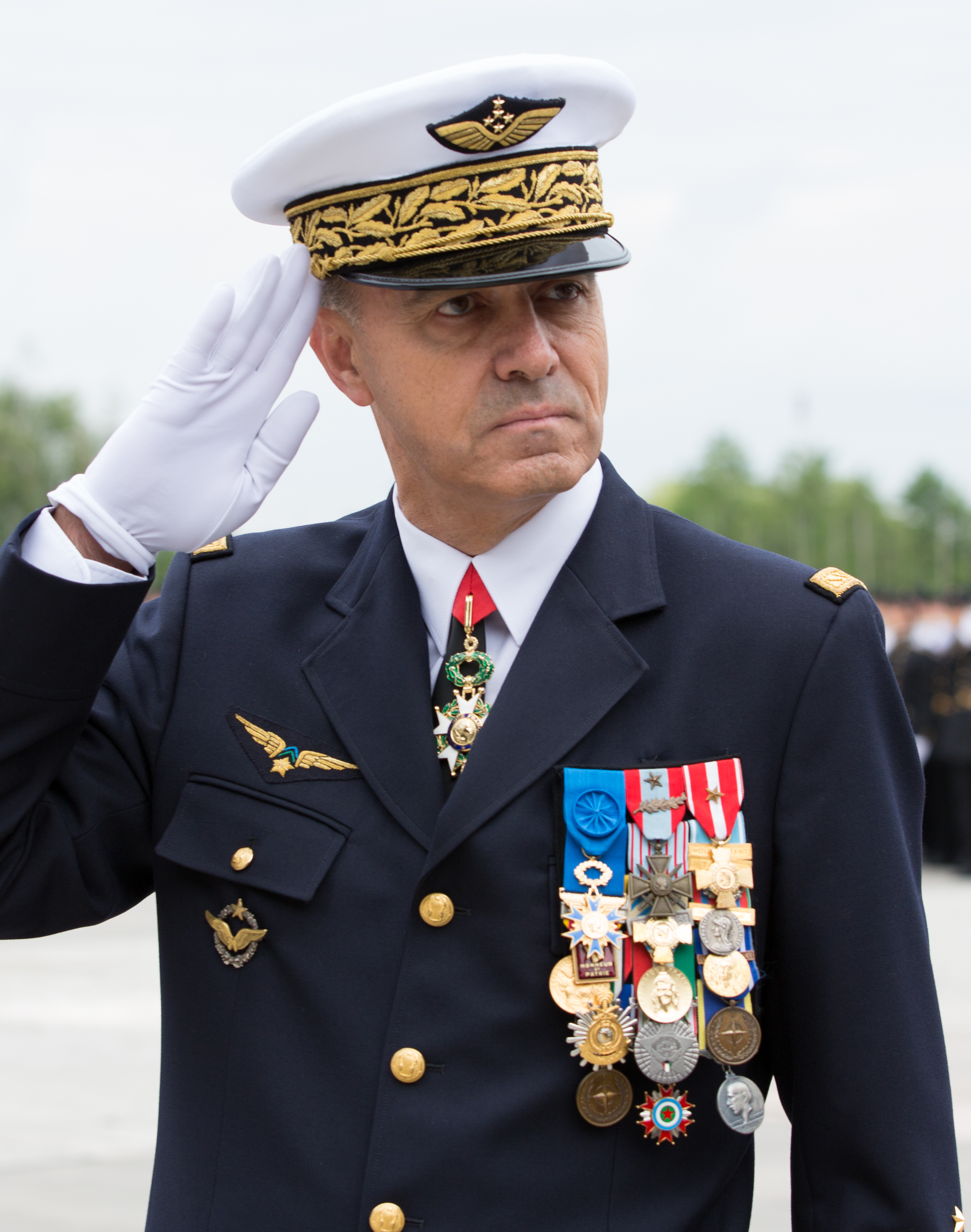
- General Lanata in 2016
- Born: André Vincent Mathieu Lanata; 10 October 1961 (age 65); Bastia, Corsica, France
- Relatives: Vincent Lanata (father)
- Military career
- Allegiance: France
- Branch: French Air and Space Force
- Service years: 1984–2021
- Rank: Général d'armée aérienne
- Commands: ER 1/33 Belfort (1985); ER 2/33 Savoie (1992); EC 2/3 Champagne (1996); Aerial Base & BSVIA (2004–2006); CEMAA (2015); SACT (2018)
- Conflicts: Chadian–Libyan War; Gulf War; Iraqi no-fly zones conflict Bosnian War; Kosovo War

André Vincent Mathieu Lanata (French pronunciation: [ɑ̃dʁe lanata]; born 10 October 1961) is a French retired general and former fighter pilot who served as Chief of Staff of the French Air Force from 21 September 2015 to 30 August 2018. Lanata went on to serve as Commander of NATO's Allied Command Transformation from 2018 to 2021.

== Biography ==
André was born in Bastia, Corsica. He is the son of Général d'armée aérienne Vincent Lanata, the former French Air Force Chief from 1991 to 1994. His wife is one of the daughters of Général de brigade Jean Pichot-Duclos.

=== Military career ===
André entered the École de l'air (French Air School) in 1981.

In 1984, he became a fighter pilot on the Mirage F1C4, then in 1985 became the Squadron Commander of the Escadron de reconnaissance 1/33 Belfort In 1992, he was the operations chief of the Escadron de reconnaissance 2/33 Savoie

In 1993, he was the officer auditor of the reconnaissance programme at the general staff headquarters session of the French Air Force at Paris.

In 1995, he was part of the 3rd promotion of the Inter-Arms Defence College. In 1996, he was the second in command, then Commander of the Escadron de Chasse 2/3 Champagne (EC 2/3 Champagne), on the Mirage 2000 D variant of the Aerial Base of Nancy.

In 2002, he was the Coherence Operational Officer (OCO) "preparations" at the general staff headquarters of the Armies. From 2004 to 2006, he commanded the Aerial Base of Djibouti and commanded the French Air Components of Djibouti, along with the Inter-Arms Vocational Support Base (BSVIA).

In 2006, he became the Plans Bureau Chief of the Air Force, then in 2008, he was designated as the deputy director of the International and Strategic Affairs at the SGDSN. From 2011 until 2013, he was the assistant general to the deputy chief of operations at the general staff headquarters of the Armies (EMA). From 2013 to 2015, he was the deputy chief of plans of the general staff headquarters of the Armies.

On 21 September 2015, he was nominated as Chief of Staff of the French Air Force (CEMAA). He left the post on 30 August 2018.

From 11 September 2018 to 23 September 2021 Lanata served as Commander of NATO's Allied Command Transformation.

==== Missions ====
Lanata participated in many operations. Brevetted as a fighter pilot, he conducted 143 war missions and registered 3,300 operational flight hours. Out of the sequential campaign engagement series, feature in part:

- 1985,
- Opération Épervier (Tchad in 1988 and 1989),
- Operation Daguet/Desert Shield & Desert Storm (Iraq 1990/1991),
- Operation Aconit/Provide Comfort (Turkey/Iraq in 1991, 1992 and 1993),
- Operation Crécerelle/Deny Flight (Bosnia Herzegovina in 1993),
- Operation Joint Endeavour (Ex-Yugoslavia in 1997),
- Operation Trident/Allied Force (Kosovo in 1999 and 2000).

==== Promotions ====
- 1 September 2008: général de brigade aérienne
- 1 September 2011: général de division aérienne
- 1 September 2013: général de corps aérien
- 21 September 2015: général d'armée aérienne

== Recognitions and honours ==
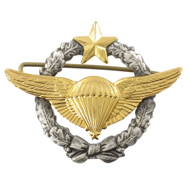

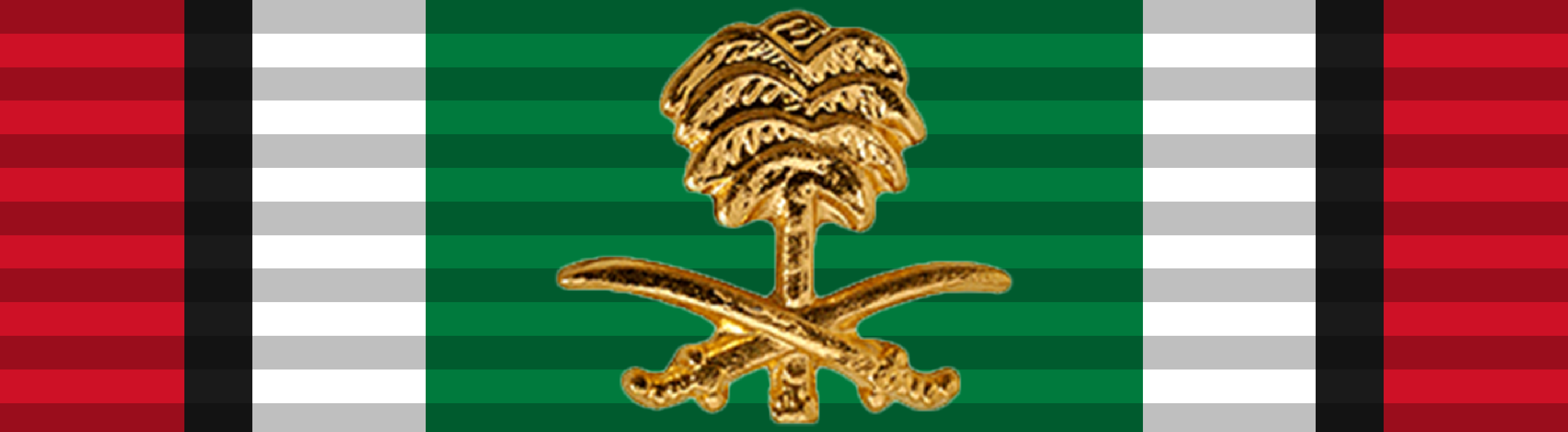

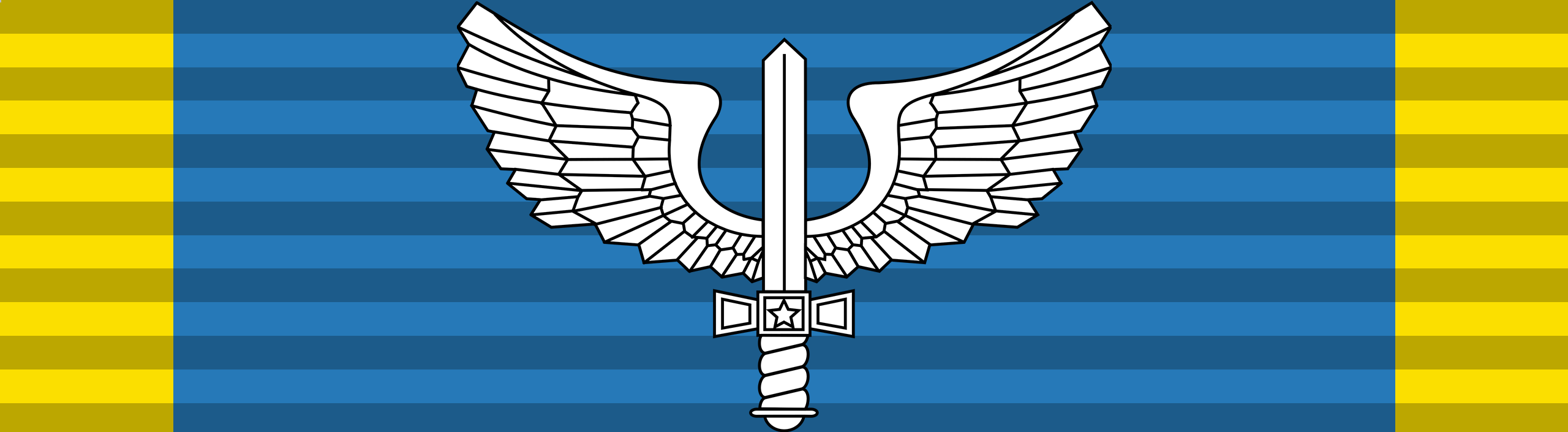

- Badge de chuteur qualifié de l'armée aérienne
- SACT Badge
- Grand Officer of the Legion of Honour (2018)
- Commander of the Ordre national du Mérite (2012)
- Croix de guerre des théâtres d'opérations extérieures with palm and bronze star
- Croix de la Valeur militaire with gilt star
- Médaille de l'Aéronautique
- Croix du Combattant
- Médaille d'Outre-Mer
- Médaille de la Défense nationale (Golden echelon)
- Medal of the Nation's Gratitude
- Médaille commémorative française
- Kuwait Liberation Medal (Saudi Arabia)
- Kuwait Liberation Medal (Kuwait)
- NATO Medal with bar (former Yugoslavia)
- NATO Medal with bar (Kosovo)
- National Order of 27 June 1977, Officer (Djibouti)
- Santos-Dumont Medal of Merit (Medalha do Mérito Santos Dumont), Brazilian Air Force

== Notes and references ==
Military offices
Preceded by Denis Mercier	Chief of Staff of the French Air Force; 21 September 2015 – 30 August 2018	Succeeded by Philippe Lavigne
Preceded by Denis Mercier	Allied Command Transformation; 11 September 2018 – 23 September 2021	Succeeded by Philippe Lavigne
