= Ranks in the French Army =

Rank insignia in the French Army are worn on the sleeve or on shoulder marks of uniforms, and range up to the highest rank of Marshal of France, a state honour denoted with a seven-star insignia that was last conferred posthumously on Marie Pierre Koenig in 1984.

== Infantry arms and cavalry arms ==
Rank insignia in the French army depend on whether the soldier belongs to an infantry or cavalry unit. The infantry arms (armes à pied) include normal infantry, naval troops, the Foreign Legion and engineers; cavalry arms (armes à cheval) include armoured cavalry, artillery, maintenance and logistics. Sleeves are emblazoned with marks denoting either gold insignia for the infantry or silver/white for the cavalry. However, the artillery uses gold as the main colour, despite being a cavalry branch, and spahis use gold as the main colour despite being part of the cavalry, a distinction representing the armoured cavalry.

== Marshal ==
Shoulder

Sleeve

Insignia of a marshal of France

The title of "Marshal of France" (Maréchal de France) is awarded as a distinction, rather than a rank. A Marshal wears seven stars and carries a baton.

Since 1916, as a distinction rather than a rank, the title of Marshal has been granted through special laws voted by the National Assembly. For this reason, it is impossible to demote a Marshal. The most famous example of this was Marshal Philippe Pétain, notorious as "chief of state" of the Vichy France regime. When he was convicted for high treason, the judges were empowered to demote his other ranks and titles. But due to the principle of separation of powers, the judges had no authority to cancel the law that had made Pétain a Marshal. It remained the only title he kept after being sentenced.

Six Marshals of France have been given the even more exalted title of "Marshal General of France" (Maréchal général de France): Biron, Lesdiguières, Turenne, Villars, Saxe, and Soult.

== Officers ==
Although they all wear the same insignia and titles, officers are divided into:

- Regular officers of the army
- Officers of the Armed Forces Commisariat Corps (formerly Army Commisariat Corps)
- Officers of the technical and administrative corps of the armed forces (formerly of the Army)

=== Officiers généraux - general officers ===
NATO rank	Rank insignia			Name		Description
NATO rank	Shoulder	Sleeve	Camouflage	French	English translation	Description
OF-9				Général d'armée	Army general	In command of an army.
OF-8				Général de corps d'armée	Army corps general	In command of an army corps. (Note: The Général de corps d'armée in the French Armed Forces, is the third ranking order of the general officer corps, based on the hierarchical order. The designation of a général de corps d'armée is situated above a général de division and underneath the designation of général d'armée. By regulation, the rank refers to an officer of the rank of « Général de division » who receives the « rank and designation » of a « Général de corps d'armée ». This rank would command an Army Corps, a unit composing several Divisions. The insignia is composed of 4 stars. A Presidential Decree on 19 November 1873 introduced for a first time the notion of "corps armée". A circular on 17 March 1921 depicted that generals commanding an Army Corps (French: corps d'armée) would wear a 4th star, forming with the first three, a diamond shape. The generals commanding the army and the members of the Superior War Council wore a 5th star, superposed in the first 4 stars. Finally a Law Decree of 6 June 1939 made official, the designations and ranks referrals of "Général d'armée", "Général de corps d'armée", "Amiral", "Vice-amiral d'escadre", "Général d'armée aérienne" et "Général de corps aérien".)
OF-7				Général de division	Divisional general	In command of a division.
OF-6				Général de brigade	Brigade general	In command of a brigade, or of a région in the Gendarmerie.

There is no distinction between infantry and cavalry generals, since they are all supposed to be able to command any type of unit. The rank was formerly designated as Lieutenant-General of the Armies until 1791. The official historic succession of the "Lieutenant-General of France" corresponded to Général de division for the French Army, and Vice-Amiral (Vice-Admiral) for the French Navy. The rank of Général de corps d'armée wasn't officially adopted until 1939, along with five other French Armed Forces ranks. It must also be noted that Army corps general and Army general are not really ranks, but styles and positions (Rang et appellation in French) bestowed upon a Divisional general, which is the highest substantive rank in the French Army.

=== Officiers supérieurs - senior officers ===
NATO rank	Rank insignia		Name		Notes
NATO rank	Shoulder	Camouflage	French	English translation	Notes
OF-5			Colonel	Colonel	A colonel commands a regiment of the army or a groupement of the Gendarmerie. Cavalry arms wear silver.
OF-4			Lieutenant-colonel	Lieutenant colonel	The lieutenant-colonel has the same responsibilities as a colonel.
OF-3			Commandant	Commandant	Also called chef de bataillon in the infantry, chef d'escadrons in the cavalry and chef d'escadron in the artillery and in the army light aviation. Equivalent to a major in most English-speaking countries.

=== Officiers subalternes - junior officers ===
NATO rank	Rank insignia		Name		Notes
NATO rank	Shoulder	Camouflage	French	English translation	Notes
OF-2			Capitaine	Captain	In command of a company (French: compagnie) of infantry, a squadron (French: escadron) of cavalry or a battery (French: batterie) of artillery.
OF-1			Lieutenant	Lieutenant	This the first commissioned rank held by officers trained at the École spéciale militaire de Saint-Cyr and the École militaire interarmes. Commands a platoon (French: section) of infantry, a troop (French: peloton) of cavalry, or a brigade of the Gendarmerie.
OF-1			Sous-lieutenant	Sub-lieutenant	A rank held during the third year at the École spéciale militaire de Saint-Cyr, and during the second year at the École militaire interarmes. This is the first commissioned rank held by contract officers trained at the École militaire des aspirants de Coëtquidan.
OF-D			Aspirant	Aspirant	A rank held by officer cadets from the École militaire des aspirants de Coëtquidan during their internship with the troops. Technically it is not a commissioned rank but it is still treated in all respects as one. The aspirant must have been previously élève officier. They will afterwards be commissioned as a sous-lieutenant. This is also a rank for volunteers serving as temporary officers (volontaire aspirant de l'Armée de terre).
OF-D			Élève officier	Officer cadet	A rank held during the first and second years at the École spéciale militaire de Saint-Cyr, during the first year at the École militaire interarmes and during the initial military training at the École militaire des aspirants de Coëtquidan for officer cadets under leadership contracts, specialist contracts and pilot contracts.

== Sous-officiers - sub-officers, i.e. non-commissioned officers ==
NATO rank	Rank insignia		Name		Notes
NATO rank	Shoulder	Camouflage	French	English translation	Notes
OR-9			Major	Major	Senior sub-officer rank since 1 January 2009 this grade is attached to the sous-officiers. Prior to this date it was an independent corps between the sous-officiers and the officiers. There is typically at least one Major per regiment and several in a brigade.
OR-9			Adjudant-chef	Chief Adjutant	Often same responsibilities as the lieutenant.
OR-8			Adjudant	Adjutant	Often same responsibilities as an adjudant-chef.
OR-7			Sergent-chef brevet militaire de 2e niveau (Infantry) Maréchal-des-logis-chef brevet militaire de 2e niveau (Cavalry)	chief sergeant BM2 In use : chief Chief marshal of lodgings BM2 In use : chief	Introduced in September 2022, as part of a reform to the NCO ranks, for sergeants qualified as platoon leaders.
OR-6			Sergent-Chef (infantry) Maréchal des logis-chef (Cavalry)	Chief sergeant In use : chief Chief marshal of lodgings In use : chief	Addressed as "chef". Typically a platoon second-in-command.
OR-5			Sergent brevet de spécialiste de l'armée de terre (infantry) Maréchal des logis brevet de spécialiste de l'armée de terre (cavalry)	Sergeant Marshal of lodgings	Typically in command of a "group" (i.e. squad).
OR-5			Sergent à la sortie de l'ENSOA Maréchal des logis à la sortie de l'ENSOA	Sergeant upon leaving ENSOA Marshal of lodgings upon leaving ENSOA	Graduate from ENSOA before acquisition of "brevet de spécialiste de l'armée de terre."
OR-D			Élève sous-officier ENSOA	ENSOA non-commissioned officer student	Student at the National Active Non-Commissioned Officers School (ENSOA)

== Militaires du rang - Troop ranks ==
Junior enlisted grades have different cloth stripe and beret colors depending on the service they are assigned to. Troupes métropolitaines ("from the French mainland") wear blue, Troupes de marine (the former troupes coloniales') wear red, and the Légion Étrangère (Foreign Legion) wear green.

A red beret indicates a paratrooper, whether from the troupes de marine or not. A legionnaire paratrooper wears a green beret with the general parachutist badge on it, the same badge used by all French Army paratroopers who have completed their training.

Senior grades' lace stripe metal depends on their arm of service, just like the officiers. Infantry and support units wear gold stripes and cavalry and technical services units wear silver stripes.

NATO rank	Rank insignia		Name		Notes
NATO rank	Shoulder	Camouflage	French	English translation	Notes
OR-4			Caporal-chef de première classe	Chief corporal first class	Caporal-chef after at least 11 years of service and appropriate qualifications.
OR-4			Caporal-chef (infantry) Brigadier-chef (Cavalry)	Chief corporal Chief brigadier	Often same responsibilities as a sergent.
OR-3			Caporal (infantry) Brigadier (Cavalry)	Corporal Brigadier	In command of an équipe - literally a team (fireteam). Presently this size unit is a trinôme in the army.
OR-2			Soldat de première classe	Private first class	This is a distinction rather than a rank.
OR-1			Soldat de deuxième classe	Private	Depending on the arm, private soldiers have distinctive titles as per below.

- Distinctive titles for privates and privates first class
  - Fantassin (infantry)
  - Légionnaire (French Foreign Legion)
  - Artilleur (artillery)
  - Sapeur (engineering, including the Paris Fire Brigade)
  - Chasseur ("hunter": light troops used for reconnaissance and harassment)
    - Chasseurs à pied (light infantry)
    - Chasseurs à cheval (light mounted infantry)
    - Chasseurs Alpins (light alpine infantry)
    - Chasseurs parachutistes (airborne infantry commandos)
  - Dragon (dragoon: mounted infantry unit)
  - Cuirassier (heavy cavalry unit)
  - Hussard (hussar, light cavalry unit)
  - Transmetteur (signals corps)
  - Conducteur (trains)
- Slang
  - Bigor (artillerie de la marine; see Troupes de marine): A term either from the gunner's order to fire (Bigue de hors) or from a species of winkle (bigorneau) because they would stick to their emplacements and couldn't be removed easily.
  - Colo (Troupes coloniales): The former term for the troupes de marine when they were colonial troops.
  - Para (troupes aéroportées): Airborne troops, short for parachutist".
  - Gazier (troupes aéroportées): Airborne troops "grunt". Friendly nickname.
  - Marsouin (literally "porpoise"; marines or naval infantry). A name coined by French sailors as they said the marines, like porpoises, hung about ships, playing games and doing no work.
  - Poilu (infanterie): "Hairy one". A term that appeared during the First Empire and used to refer to the French soldiers as they often wore a beard and/or a moustache—and were represented that way on memorials. Nowadays, this term is used to refer to French soldiers who fought in the trenches of World War I, but is seldom used to refer to World War II soldiers. It is symbolic of bravery and endurance.
  - Biffin slang used by troupes de marine and fusiliers marins to designate other infantry units. Probably comes from the fact that marsouins and naval riflemen used to own their uniforms and were proud of it, whereas other units were dressed in rags (biffe is an old French word for rag). This word is not used to designate a legionnaire.

There are also distinctions to distinguish volunteers and conscripts, and bars for experience (one for five years; up to four can be obtained).

== Armament Engineers and Armament Design and Technology Engineers ==
The combat engineer officers are using normal military rank designations, but the Armament Engineers and the Armament Design and Technology Engineers have special rank titles signifying them as members of a technological auxiliary corps.

NATO rank	Rank insignia		Grade		Notes
NATO rank	Ingénieurs de l'armement	Ingénieurs des études et techniques de l'armement (Note: Armament Design and Technology Engineers)	French	English translation	Notes
OF-9			Ingénieur général de classe exceptionnelle	Engineer general exceptional class	
OF-8			Ingénieur général hors classe	Engineer general special class	
OF-7			Ingénieur général de première classe	Engineer general first class	
OF-6			Ingénieur général de deuxième classe	Engineer general second class	
OF-5			Ingénieur en chef (Armament Engineers) Ingénieur en chef de 1re classe (Armament Design and Technology Engineers)	Chief engineer Chief engineer 1st class	With more than two years in grade for Armament Engineers
OF-4			Ingénieur en chef (Armament Engineers) Ingénieur en chef de 2e classe (Armament Design and Technology Engineers)	Chief engineer Chief engineer 2nd class	With less than two years in grade for Armament Engineers
OF-3			Ingénieur principal	Principal engineer	
OF-2			Ingénieur	Engineer	4th to 9th level for Armament Engineers 6th to 10th level for Armament Design and Technology Engineers
OF-1			Ingénieur	Engineer	2nd and 3rd level f 3rd year at ENSTA for Armament Design and Technology Engineers
OF-1			Ingénieur	Engineer	1st level for Armament Engineers Second year at ENSTA for Armament Design and Technology Engineers
OF-D	n/a		Aspirant	Aspirant	During the preliminary year of training at the armed forces and during the first year at ENSTA Bretagne or ENSTA Paris for Armament Design and Technology Engineers.

== Armed Forces Commissariat Service ==
The branch specific commissariat services have been replaced by an Armed Forces Commissariat Service common for Armed Forces of France.

NATO rank	Rank insignia	Grade		Notes
NATO rank	Shoulder	French	English translation	Notes
OF-8		Commissaire général hors classe	Senior Commissary General	Rank held by the Central Director of the Armed Forces Commissariat Service and the Inspector General of the Armed Forces Commissariat Service
OF-7		Commissaire général de première classe	Commissary general first class	Rank held by the Deputy Central Director and assistant directors or Directors of Expert Centers
OF-6		Commissaire général de deuxième classe	Commissary general second class	Rank held by assistant directors or Directors of Expert Centers
OF-5		Commissaire en chef de première classe	Chief Commissary first class	
OF-4		Commissaire en chef de deuxième classe	Chief Commissary second class	
OF-3		Commissaire principal	Principal Commissary	
OF-2		Commissaire de première classe	Commissary first class	
OF-1		Commissaire de deuxième classe	Commissary second class	
OF-1		Commissaire de troisième classe	Commissary third class	Second-year student at the Army Commissary School First-year Commissary Contract Officer (OSC)
OF-D		Aspirant commissaire	Aspirant Commissary	First-year student at the Army Commissary School Volunteer Commissary Aspirant (VAC)

== Armed Forces Health Service ==
The French Armed Forces Health Service (Service de Santé des Armées) SSA is responsible for medical and sanitary support of the French Armed Forces and of all institutions placed under the authority of the French Ministry of Armed Forces. It is a joint service, and its central administration is under the direct control of the Chief of the French Defence Staff.

=== Physicians, pharmacists, dentists, veterinarians and hospital interns ===
Armed Forces practitioners are divided into five corps of career officers: Physicians, pharmacists, dentists, veterinarians and hospital interns. Below is the ranks and rank insignia for surgeons (physicians); they have a crimson velvet backing for their rank insignia. Pharmacists have green velvet, dentists have plum velvet and veterinarians have garnet velvet. Officer cadets and hospital interns wear the backing of their corps; although veterinarians do not serve as hospital interns and hence lack the rank of Interne.

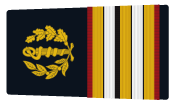
Chief Surgeon

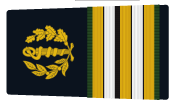
Chief Pharmacist

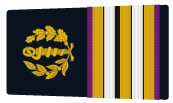
Chief Dental Surgeon

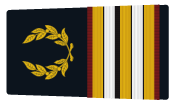
Chief Veterinary Surgeon

NATO rank	Rank insignia	Grade		Notes
NATO rank	Shoulder	French	English translation	Notes
OF-8		Médecin général des armées	Armed Forces Surgeon General	Rank held by the Central Director of the Armed Forces Health Service and the Inspector General of the Armed Forces Health Service.
OF-7		Médecin général inspecteur	Surgeon Inspector General	Holds a command appointment
OF-7		Médecin chef des services hors classe	Surgeon Head of Services, Special Class	
OF-6		Médecin général	Surgeon General	Holds a command appointment
OF-6		Médecin chef des services hors classe	Surgeon Head of Services, Normal Class	
OF-5		Médecin chef	Chief Surgeon	From the 4th level
OF-4		Médecin chef	Chief Surgeon	
OF-3		Médecin principal	Principal Surgeon	
OF-2		Médecin	Surgeon	
OF-1		Interne	Intern	Medical student from the seventh year of study up to the reception of the State Diploma of Doctor of Medicine.
OF-D		Aspirant médecin	Aspirant Surgeon	Medical student from the second year up to the seventh year of study
OF-D		Élève-officier médecin	Medical Officer Cadet	Medical student during the first year of study

=== Military nurses and technicians of army hospitals ===
Military nurses and technicians of army hospitals (MITHA) are paramedic and medical support personnel whose status is modelled on that of the hospital public service, but simultaneously falls under the general status of military personnel. The particular hierarchy of MITHA does not have relative rank with the general military hierarchy; but wear insignia of the appearance of a general military rank, in order to have their position recognized for the application of the obligations, rights and prerogatives of military personnel.

Insignia	Directors of care	Managers of allied health professions	Psychologists
	Exceptional class Superior class		
	Normal class	Superior class	Superior class from 6th level
		Senior executive	Superior class 1st to 5th level
		Manager after having worn a lieutenant's insignia of appearance for 5 years	Normal class after having worn a lieutenant's insignia of appearance for 4 years
		Manager	Normal class after having worn a sub-lieutenant's insignia of appearance for 1 year
			Normal class

Insignia	Nurse anaesthetists	Electrocardiology technicians	Physiotherapists	General and special care nurses	Dietician Laboratory technicians Pharmacy technicians	Medical administrative assistant	Hospital technicians	Practical nurses
	2nd grade 1st grade	Superior class from the 6th level Normal class from the 9th level	Superior class from the 5th level Normal class from the 9th level	3rd grade 2nd grade from the 5th level	Superior class from the 4th level	Exceptional class from 3rd level	Superior hospital technician 1st class from 3rd level	
		Superior class 3rd to 5th level Normal class 5th to 8th level	Superior class 1st to 4th level Normal class 5th to 8th level	2nd grade from 1st to 4th level 1st grade from 5th level	Superior class from 1st to 3rd level Normal class from 6th level	Exceptional class 1st and 2nd level Superior class Normal class from 9th level	Superior hospital technician 1st class 1st and 2nd level Superior hospital technician 2nd class from 6th level	
		Superior class 1st and 2nd levels Normal class 1st to 3rd level	Normal class 1st to 4th level	1st grade from 2nd to 4th level	Normal class 3rd to 5th level	Normal class 5th to 8th level	Superior hospital technician 2nd class 3rd to 5th level	Superior class
				1st grade 1st level	Normal class 1st and 2nd levels	Normal class 2nd to 4th level	Superior hospital technician 2nd class 1st and 2nd level	Normal class from the 3rd level
						Normal class 1st level	Hospital technician	Normal class 1st and 2nd level
				Nursing student 3rd year				
				Nursing student 2nd year				
				Nursing student 1st year				

== Military chaplains ==
Rank	Insignia		
Rank	Christian	Jewish	Muslim
Chief military chaplain			
Deputy chief military chaplain			
Regional military chaplain			
Military chaplain			
Lay person - military chaplain Catholic chaplaincy of the army		—N/a	—N/a
Reserve military chaplain			

== Ranks formerly used in the Army ==
- Brigadier des armées du roi (lit. 'Brigadier of the king's armies') lowest general officer rank of the Ancien Régime Army.
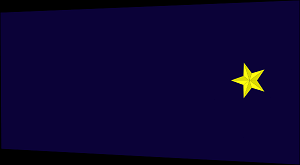
- Sergent-Major was a rank created in 1776 and was renamed Sergent-Chef in 1928. The four-chevron NCO rank of Sergent-Major was re-established in 1942, now given to company administrative Sous-officiers, and ranked between the three-chevron Sergent-Chef and Adjudant. Eventually promotions were put on hold in 1962. The rank was officially abolished in 1971, though present rank holders were allowed to continue to use it. The last Sergent-Major retired in 1985.
- Sergent appelés ("Conscript Sergeant" - Foot) / Maréchal des logis appelés ("Conscript Sergeant" - Horse) was a rank given to a conscript promoted to Sergeant while they were on National Service. A career Sergent or Maréchal des logis who had enlisted (who wore two lace chevrons instead of the conscript's one) would outrank them.
- Fourrier ("Quartermaster") - A sous-officier in charge of distributing rations, keeping the unit's accounts, and arranging and assigning living quarters when the company was on the march. If there wasn't a decent-sized town or city on the route, the Fourrier would travel with the Pionniers to clear and set up a campsite for the unit.
- Anspessade (archaic)

== See also ==
- French Army
