= Antoine Mattei =

French officer (1917–1981)

Antoine Mattei (23 March 1917, in Scolca – 31 May 1981) was an officer of the French Foreign Legion made famous by the writings of Paul Bonnecarrère, who published in 1968 Par le sang versé (By the blood shed), the title refers to one of the ways a legionnaire obtains French nationality, and La guerre cruelle (The cruel war) in 1972, which also featured his exploits. He is a legendary figure of the 3rd Foreign Infantry Regiment. He published an account of his time during the war in Indochina under the title Tu survivras longtemps (You will survive for a long time). The title is a quote from a poem by Louis Aragon.

He entered the Special Military School of St Cyr in 1938 and graduated with the rank of lieutenant. He participated in the Battle of France during World War II and was imprisoned by the Germans from 1940 to 1945. In 1946, he served in Indochina in the 3rd Foreign Infantry Regiment until 1952, with the successive ranks of lieutenant and captain.

He was then appointed to SILE, then in a Saharan Company Scope of the Foreign Legion. He served in the 1st Foreign Regiment from 1955 until 1957. He was then a major. He then went from Indochina to Algeria. From 1957 to 1959 he was posted to 4th Foreign Regiment and returned to the 1st Foreign Regiment from 1960 to 1961.

He finally joined the 3rd Foreign Infantry Regiment with the rank of lieutenant colonel.
