= Philippe Lavigne =

French general (born 1965)

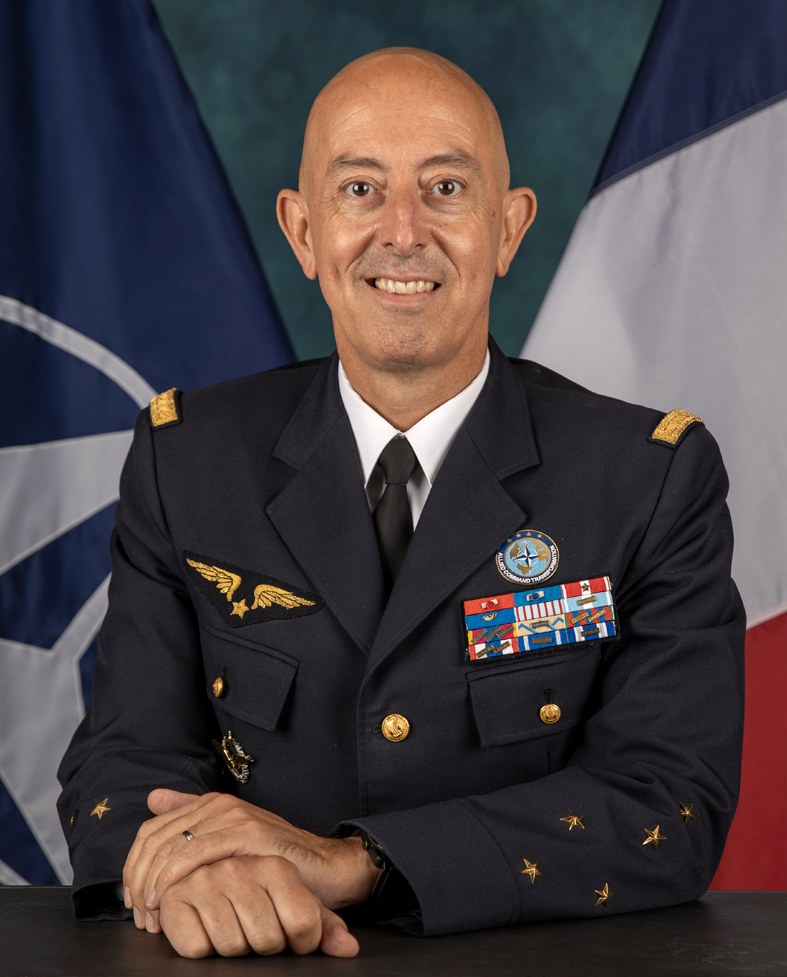
- Official portrait, 2021
- Born: Philippe Émile Éloïs Lavigne; 25 September 1965 (age 61); Bergerac, France
- Alma mater: Prytanée National Militaire (1979–1985), School of the Air (1985–1989), Collège interarmées de Défense (1999–2000), Institut des Hautes Études de Défense Nationale (2008–2009), Centre des Hautes Études Militaires (2008–2009)
- Military career
- Allegiance: France
- Branch: French Air and Space Force
- Service years: 1985–2024
- Rank: Aerial General
- Units: Air and Space
- Commands: Allied Command Transformation, Air Force Chief of Staff, Fighter Squadron Vendée
- Conflicts: Iraqi no-fly zones conflict War in Afghanistan
- Awards: Cross for Military Valour, Overseas Medal

Philippe Émile Éloïs Lavigne (French pronunciation: [filip laviɲ]; born 25 September 1969) is a French retired general and fighter pilot. He served as Chief of Staff of the French Air and Space Force from 31 August 2018 to 10 September 2021 and NATO Supreme Allied Commander Transformation from 23 September 2021 to 23 September 2024.

He graduated from Prytanée National Militaire in 1985 and joined the School of Air (Salon-de-Provence Air School) in which he qualified as a pilot in 1989. He flew the Mirage 2000 during operations in the former Yugoslavia and in Iraq, where he flew more than 2000 flight hours. He flew more than 50 combat missions. He was later in command of Fighter Squadron Vendée. He attended the Collège interarmées de Défense (Joint Defence College) to until 2000 before commanding the Vendée. He was in charge of Operation Carbet in Haiti in 2004. He participated in the South Asia Operation Béryx in 2005. He was moved to Paris to serve the Paris-based Joint Strategic Planning and Command Operations Centre in which he was tasked with several peacekeeping and humanitarian operations to until 2005 when he rose to be the planning officer of Air Force Staff, in the office which he relate with issues related to space and European cooperation. He went on to Institut des Hautes Études de Défense Nationale (Institute of Advanced Studies, National Defence) for Centre for Higher Military Studies Defence policy course to until 2009 and of the Centre des Hautes Études Militaires too, he became the deputy director incharge of war material exports in the General Secretariat for Defence and National Security after completing the policy course to 2012.

He served as the director of information in Armed Forces HQ in 2014 before he rose to be incharge of the French Chief of Defence's front office to until 2018, he was moved to Paris to occupied the Afghanistan Kabul International Airport through which French forces engaged in Operation Pamir of the both he supervised the formation of operations from the airport to civil authorities under the military responsibilities.

== NATO ==
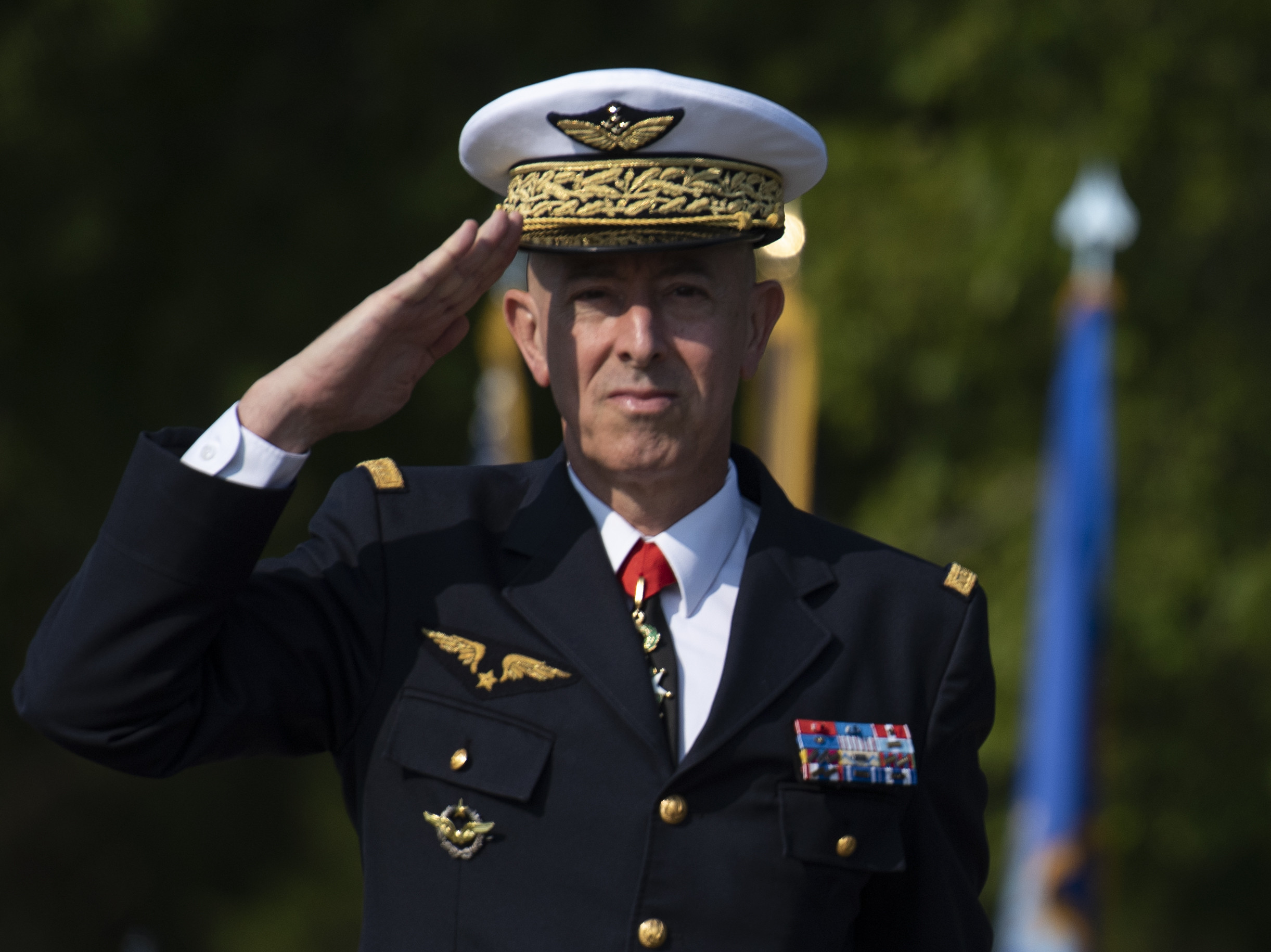
General Philippe Lavigne visit to the United States in 2021

He was nominated to head the Supreme Allied Commander Transformation HQ in Norfolk, Virginia by the North Atlantic Council on 28 May 2021, and formally took over the role on 23 September 2021.

== Ranks and commands ==
He rose to the rank of General of the Air Brigade in 2015 followed an appointment to commands of the Air Brigade of the Aviation of hunting in Dijon and of the Bordeaux-Mérignac in September, as head combat aviation operational readiness in 2016, he was appointed to Armed Force HQ to serve as chief cabinet and later a promotion to Air major general in 2017 until he became the Chief of Staff of the Air Force which followed with a promotion to Air lieutenant general on 31 August 2018.

== Personal life ==
General Philippe Lavigne has one child.

== Awards and decorations ==
- Commander of the Legion of Honour
- Commander of the National Order of Merit
- Officer of the Legion of Honor
- Cross for Military Valour
- Overseas Medal
- Pingat Jasa Gemilang (Tentera) Meritorious Service Medal (Military)

Military offices
Preceded by André Lanata	Supreme Allied Commander Transformation; 2021–2024	Succeeded by Pierre Vandier
Preceded by André Lanata	Chief of Staff of the French Air and Space Force; 2018–2021	Succeeded by Stéphane Mille
