= Ranks in the French Navy =

The rank insignia of the French Navy (French: Marine Nationale) are worn on shoulder straps of shirts and white jackets, and on sleeves for navy jackets and mantels. Until 2005, only commissioned officers had an anchor on their insignia, but enlisted personnel are now receiving them as well. Although the names of the ranks for superior officers contain the word "Capitaine" (Capitaine de corvette, Capitaine de frégate and Capitaine de vaisseau), the appropriate style to address them is "Commandant", "Capitaine" referring to "lieutenant de vaisseau", which is translated as lieutenant. The two highest ranks, Vice-amiral d'escadre and Amiral (Admiral), are functions, rather than ranks. They are assumed by officers ranking Vice-amiral (Vice-Admiral).

The rank of Vice-Admiral of France (French: Vice-Amiral) was formerly designated as Lieutenant-General of the Naval Armies until 1791, such as in the Levant Fleet and Flotte du Ponant of the Ancien Régime. Major of the French Navy has a similar history to that of the former Lieutenant-General of the Naval Armies.

The only Amiral de la Flotte (Admiral of the Fleet) was François Darlan after he was refused the dignity of Admiral of France. Equivalent to the dignity of Marshal of France, the rank of Admiral of France remains theoretical in the Fifth Republic; it was last granted in 1869, during the Second Empire, but retained during the Third Republic until the death of its bearer in 1873. The title of Amiral de la Flotte was created so that Darlan would not have an inferior rank to that of his counterpart in the British Royal Navy, who was an Admiral of the Fleet.

== Insignia ==
The insignia below depict the configuration on shoulder boards. Shoulder straps are slightly different, notably without the golden frame for general officers.

=== Great officers ===
NATO rank	Rank insignia		Name	
NATO rank	Shoulder	Sleeve	French	English translation
OF-10			Amiral de France	Admiral of France

=== Officers ===
==== Officiers généraux – flag officers ====
NATO rank	Rank insignia			Name	
NATO rank	Shoulder	Sleeve	Flag	French	English translation
OF-9				Amiral	Admiral
OF-8				Vice-Amiral d'escadre	Squadron vice-admiral
OF-7				Vice-Amiral	Vice-admiral
OF-6				Contre-Amiral	Counter admiral

==== Officiers supérieurs – senior officers ====
NATO rank	Rank insignia		Name	
NATO rank	Shoulder	Sleeve	French	English translation
OF-5			Capitaine de vaisseau	Ship-of-the-line captain
OF-4			Capitaine de frégate	Frigate Captain
OF-3			Capitaine de corvette	Corvette Captain

==== Officiers subalternes – junior officers ====
NATO rank	Rank insignia		Name	
NATO rank	Shoulder	Sleeve	French	English translation
OF-2			Lieutenant de vaisseau	Ship-of-the-line lieutenant
OF-1			Enseigne de vaisseau de première classe	Ship-of-the-line ensign, first class
OF-1			Enseigne de vaisseau de deuxième classe	Ship-of-the-line ensign, second class
OF-(D)			Aspirant	Midshipman

=== Warrant, petty officers and enlisted personnel ===
==== Officiers mariniers – warrant and petty officers ====
NATO rank	Rank insignia		Name	
NATO rank	Shoulder	Sleeve	French	English translation
OR-9			Major	Major
OR-9			Maître-principal	Principal master
OR-8			Premier-maître	First master
OR-6			Maître	Master
OR-5			Second-maître	Second master

==== Matelots et quartiers-maîtres – sailors and quarter-masters ====
NATO rank	Rank insignia		Name	
NATO rank	Shoulder	Sleeve	French	English translation
OR-4			Quartier-maître de 1re classe	Quartermaster first class
OR-3			Quartier-maître de 2e classe	Quartermaster second class
OR-2			Matelot 2^{ème} and 1^{ère} classe	Able seaman
OR-1			Mousse	Seaman

== Attributions ==
Personnel with a particular attribution may wear distinctive features on their rank insignia. For instance, medical officers bear two red stripes on their insignia. Similarly, the Ingénieur des études et techniques de travaux maritimes wear pearl-grey stripes.

Peintres de la Marine, who are not employed by the navy but have a special status, wear a uniform and officer straps with rank insignia replaced with the words "Peintre officiel".

Capitaine de vaisseau
Captain of the Vessel
(Captain)

Chief Surgeon First Class

Chief engineer first class

Peintre de la Marine

Chief War Commissar First Class

== Military chaplains ==
Rank	Insignia		
Rank	Christian	Jewish	Muslim
Chief Military Chaplain			
Deputy Chief Military Chaplain			
Regional military chaplain			
Military chaplain			

== Ranks formerly used in the Navy ==
- Vice-amiral de France (Vice Admiral of France)
- Lieutenant général des armées navales
- Chef d'escadre
- Brigadier des armées navales and Chef de division
- Major de vaisseau
- Capitaine de vaisseau et de port
- Lieutenant de vaisseau et de port
- Capitaine de brûlot
- Lieutenant de frégate
- Capitaine de flûte
- Sous-lieutenant de vaisseau
- Sous-lieutenant de port
- Enseigne de vaisseau non entretenu
- Élèves de la Marine
- Garde de la marine
- Maître amiral
- Maître vice-amiral
- Contre maître
- Aide pilote
- Second maître appelés
- Second maître de 1re classe
- Second maître de 2e classe
- Quartier-maitre-chef de carrière

== See also ==
- French Navy
