= Equatorial Forest Training Center =

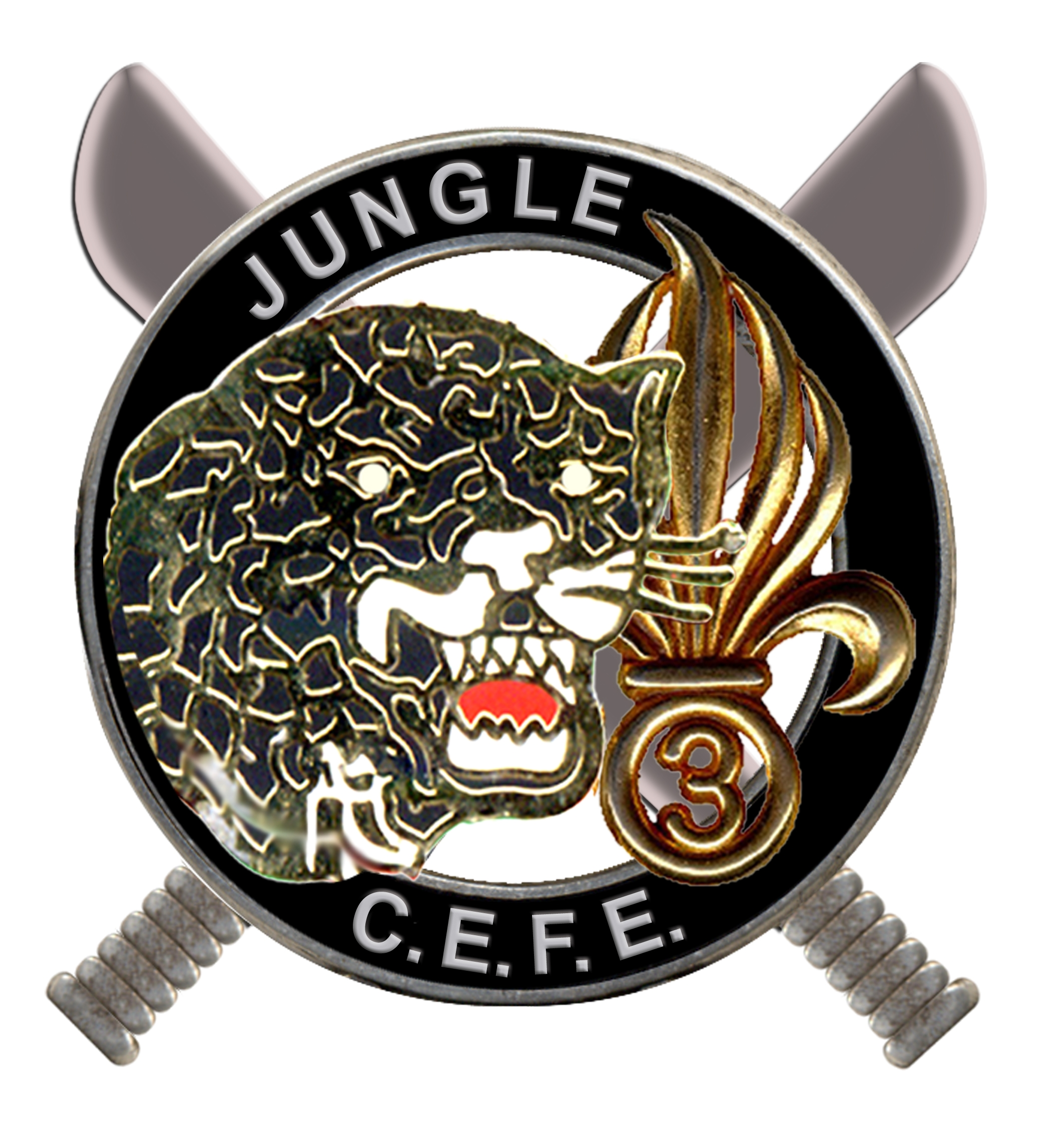
- Active: 1987 – Present
- Country: France
- Branch: (France) French Army
- Type: Training
- Role: Jungle Warfare Instruction
- Part of: 3rd Foreign Infantry Regiment
- Garrison/HQ: Régina, French Guiana
- Website: Official Website

The Equatorial Forest Training Center (CEFE), or Centre d'entraînement en forêt équatoriale, is a French Army jungle warfare school located in French Guiana.

== Overview ==
The Equatorial Forest Training Center was established on September 22, 1987 near Régina in French Guiana. The Jungle Training Center is attached to the Command and Support Company of the 3rd Foreign Infantry Regiment.

== Training ==
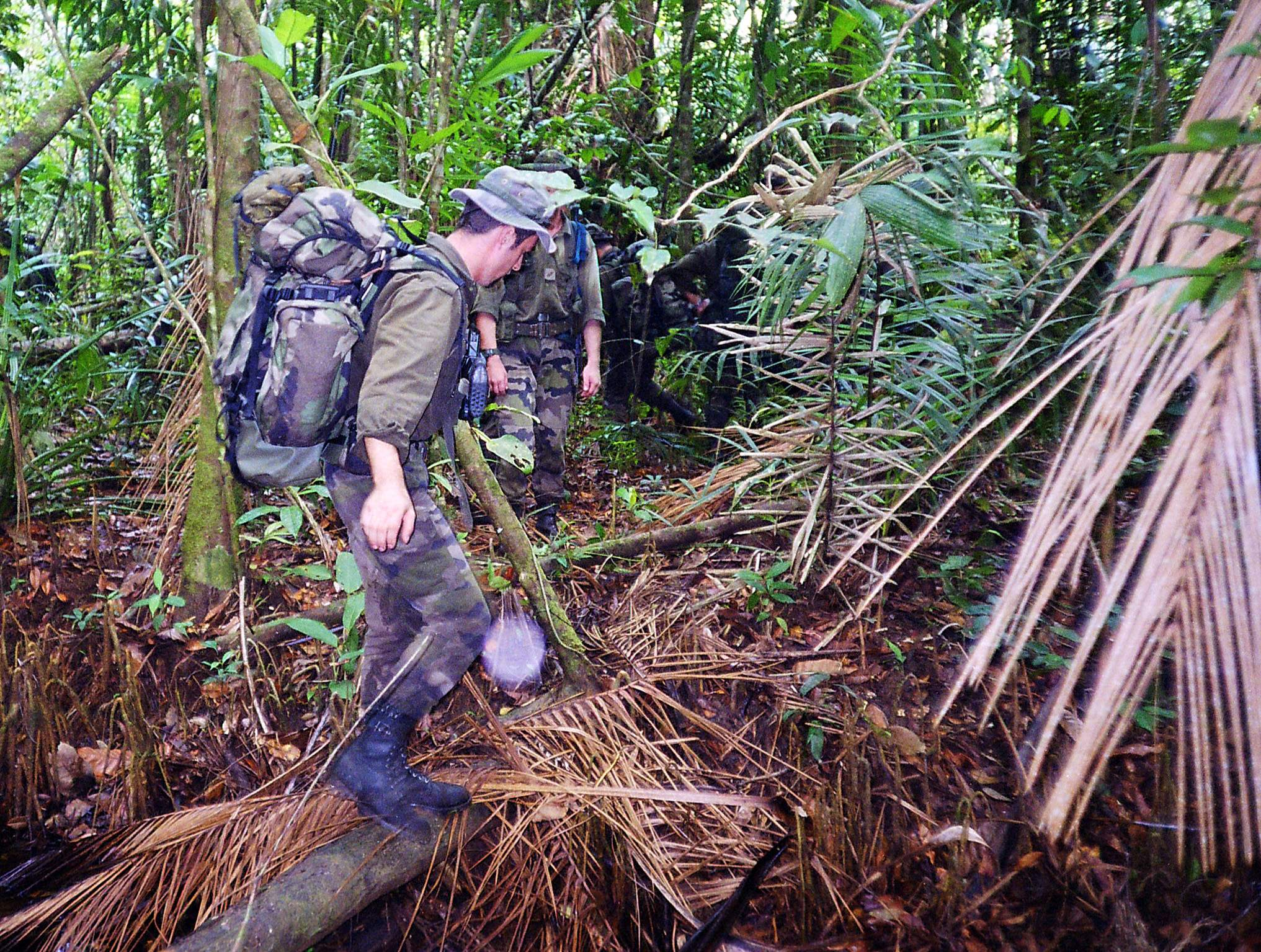

The Equatorial Forest Training Center offers four different training courses in jungle warfare for unit-sized groups:

- Initiation Course: This course lasts four days during which time the students are familiarized with jungle survival.
- Jungle Warfare Course: This course lasts for two weeks during which time the unit is prepared for operating in a jungle or tropical environment. The course's elements are modular, allowing the course to be customized according to the student unit's needs and expertise.
- Advanced Jungle Warfare Course: This course lasts for two weeks and was developed to impart specific skills to infantry and special forces units.
- Survival Course: This course is intended to impart the student unit with specific survival skill or field test equipment in a jungle environment.

== Gallery ==
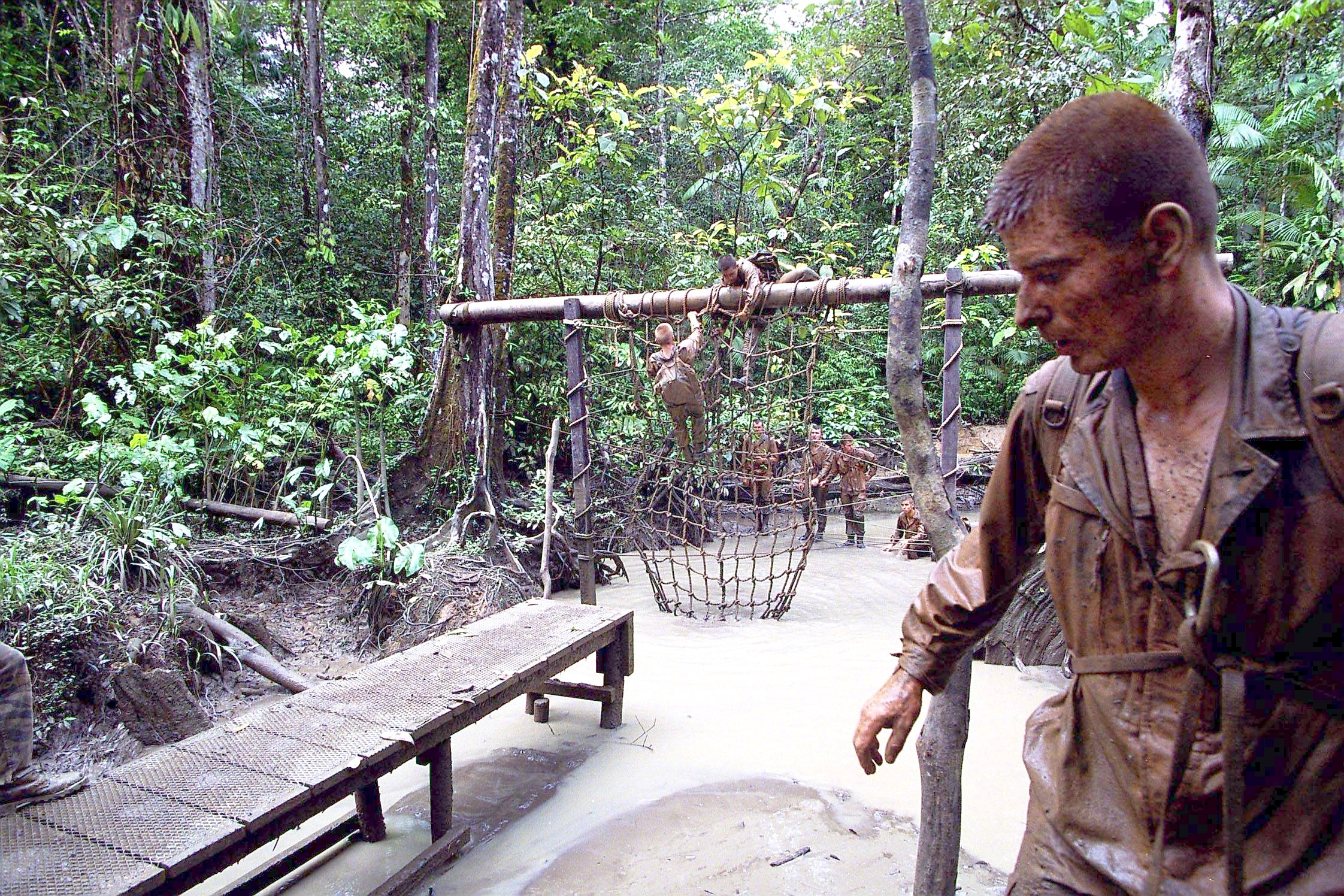

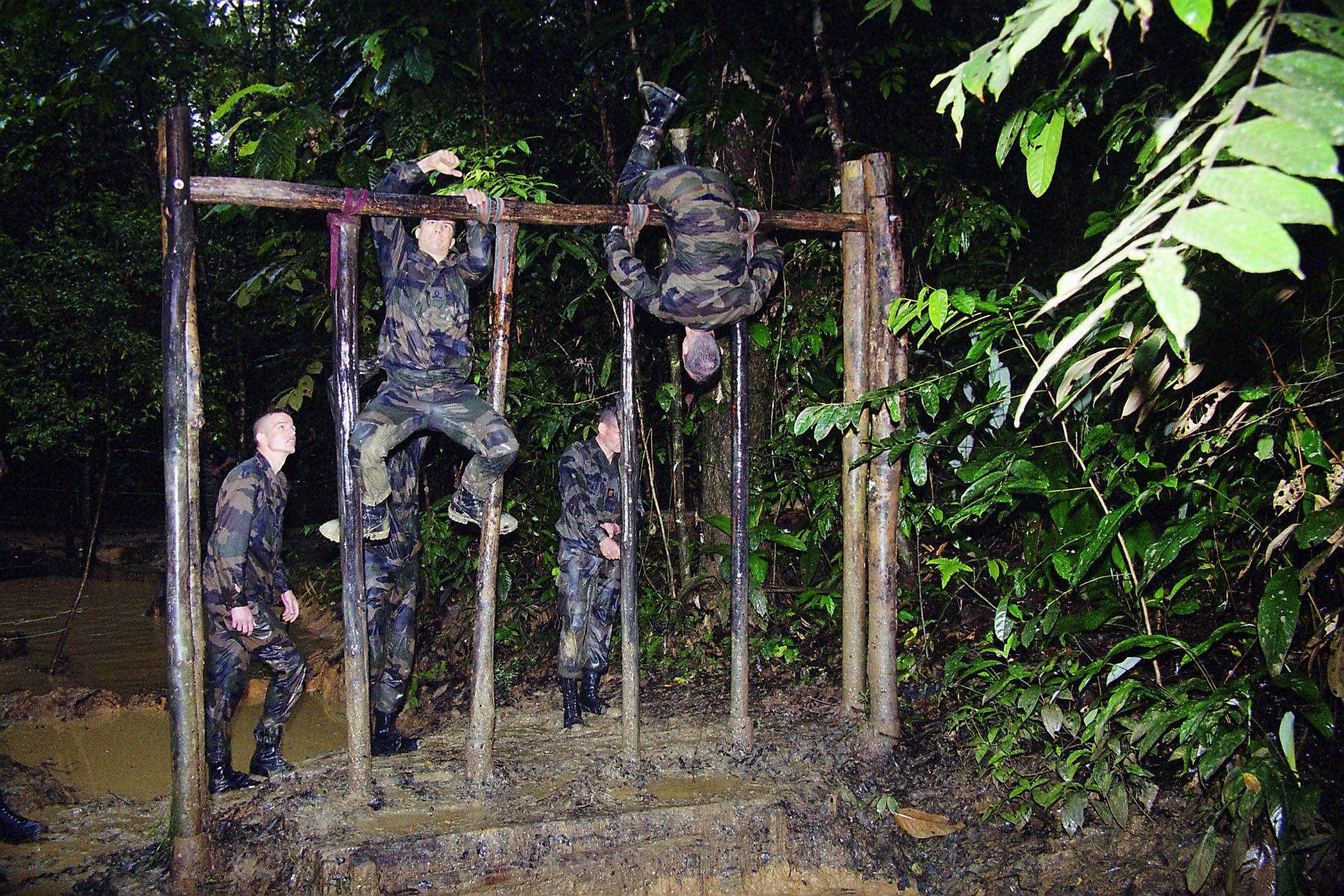

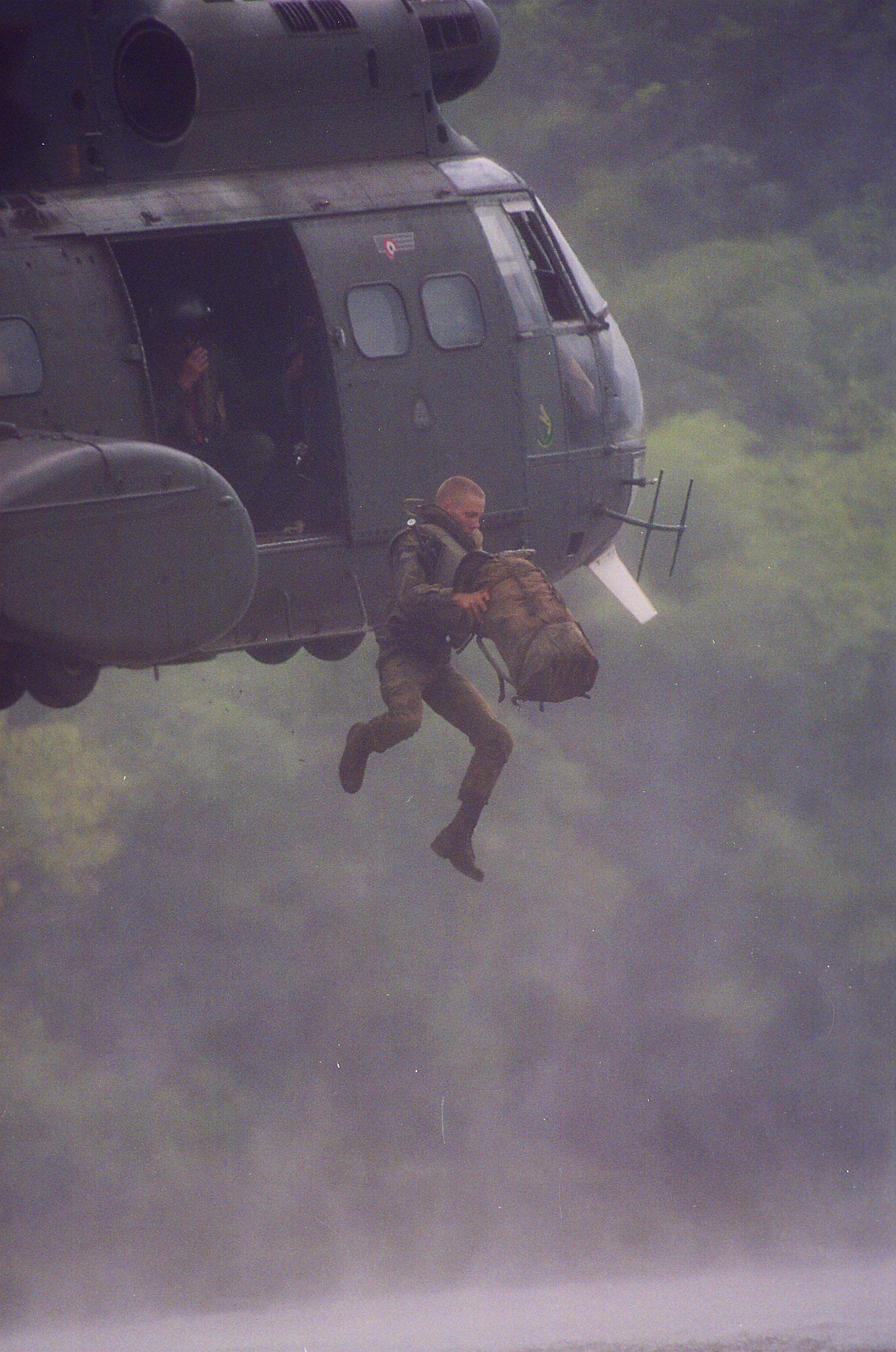

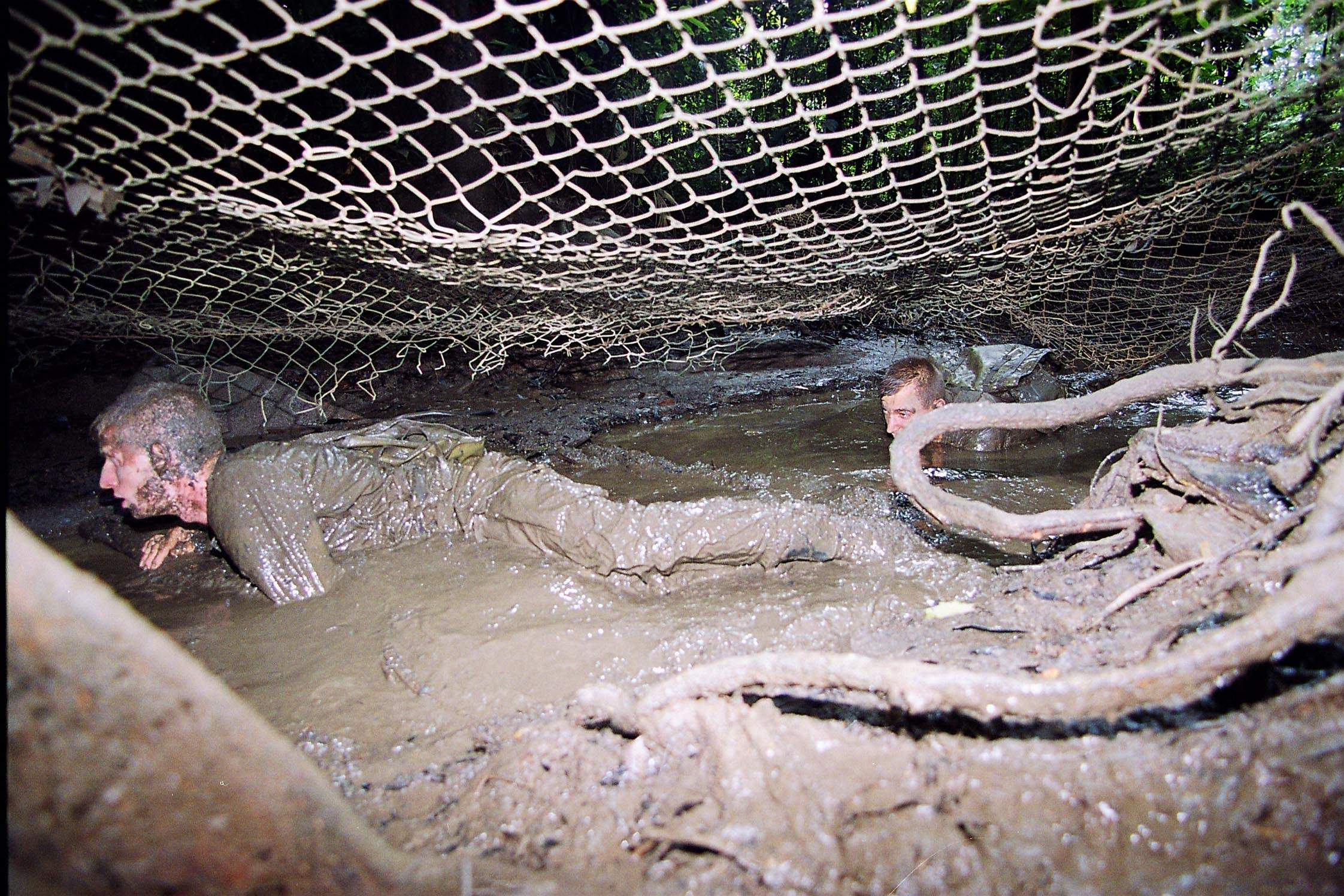

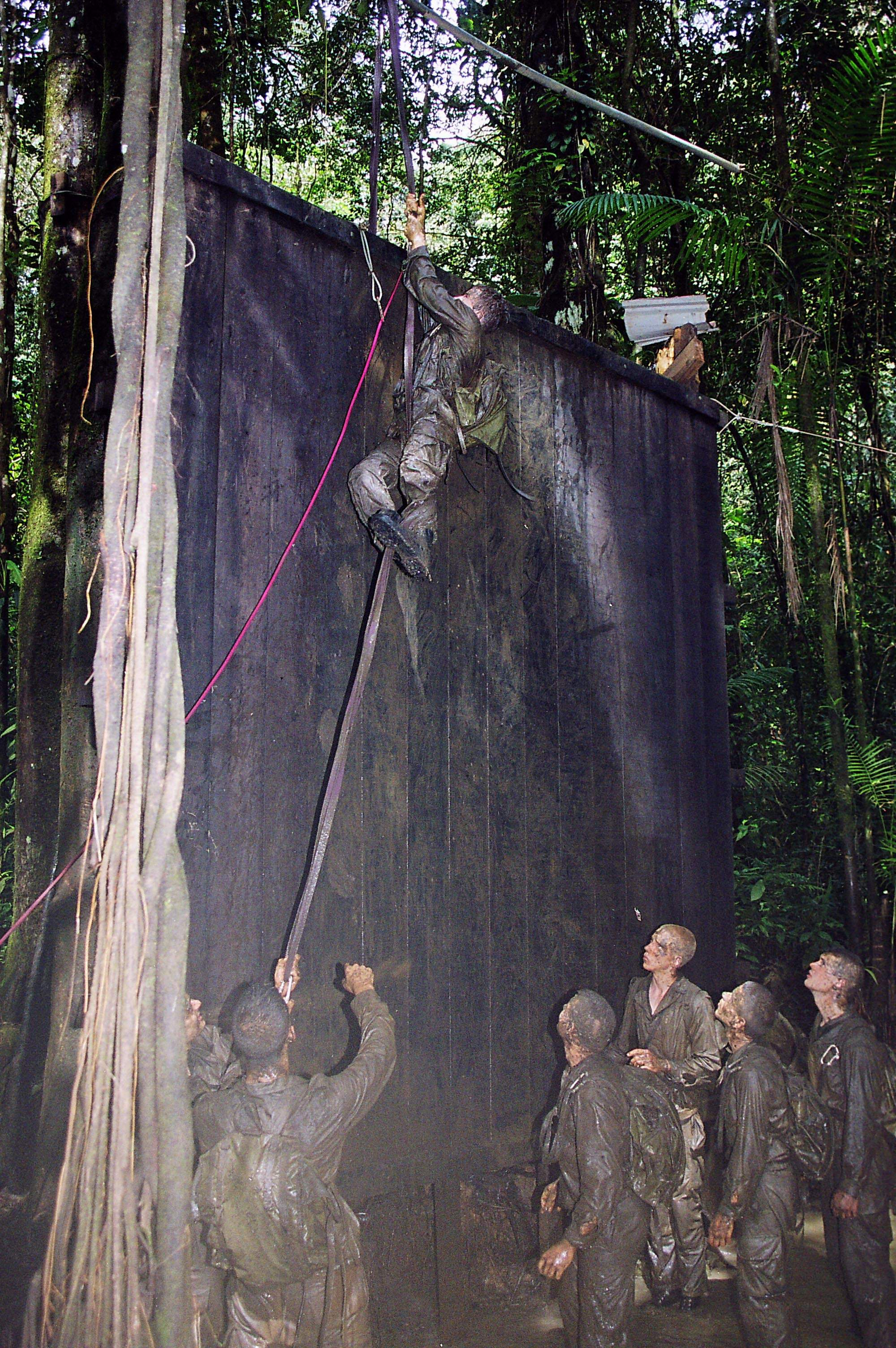
