= Police ranks of France =

The Police ranks of French police officers denote the position of a given officer in the police hierarchy in French gendarmerie and police forces.

== Police Nationale ==
National Police of France	Functional titles			
Title insignia				
Rank	Directeur général (Director general)	Directeur des services actifs (Director of active services)	Inspecteur général (Inspector general)	Contrôleur général (Controller general)

National Police of France	Corps de conception et de direction		
Rank insignia			
Rank	Commissaire général de police (Commissioner general of police)	Commissaire divisionnaire de police (Divisional commissioner of police)	Commissaire de police (Commissioner of police)
Rank	Commissaire général de police (Commissioner general of police)	Commissaire divisionnaire de police (Divisional commissioner of police)	stagiaire / élève (Probationary / candidate)

National Police of France	Corps de commandement				
Rank insignia					
Rank	Commandant divisionnaire (Divisional commandant of police)	Commandant de police (Commandant of police)	Capitaine de police (Captain of police)		
Rank	à l'emploi fonctionnel (in functional position)	Commandant de police (Commandant of police)	referred to as Lieutenant de police during 4 years after training	stagiaire (Probationary)	élève (Candidate)

National Police of France	Corps d'encadrement et d'application				
Rank insignia					
Rank	Major de police (Major of police)		Brigadier-chef de police (Chief brigadier of police)	Gardien de la paix (Constable)	
Rank	responsable d’unité locale de police (RULP) (responsible of a local police unit)	à l’échelon exceptionnel (in exceptional pay grade)	Brigadier-chef de police (Chief brigadier of police)	stagiaire (Probationary)	élève (Candidate)

National Police of France	Other corps and positions	
Rank insignia		
Rank	Policier adjoint	policier réserviste (National Police reservists)

== Gendarmerie ==
Officers

NATO code	OF-10	OF-9	OF-8	OF-7	OF-6	OF-5	OF-4	OF-3	OF-2	OF-1
(France) French Gendarmerie
(France) French Gendarmerie		Général d'armée	Général de corps d'armée	Général de division	Général de brigade	Colonel	Lieutenant-Colonel	Chef d'Escadron	Capitaine	Lieutenant	Sous-Lieutenant

Non-commissioned officers and volunteer assistant gendarmes

NATO code	OR-9		OR-8	OR-7	OR-6	OR-5			OR-4	OR-3	OR-2	OR-1
(France) French Gendarmerie
(France) French Gendarmerie	Major	Adjudant-chef	Adjudant		Maréchal-des-logis-chef	Gendarme	Gendarme sous contrat	Gendarme Adjoint Maréchal-des-logis	Gendarme Adjoint Brigadier Chef	Gendarme Adjoint Brigadier	Gendarme Adjoint première classe	Gendarme Adjoint

== Police Municipale ==
Police ranks of French Municipal Police
Category	A: Police directors		B: Police chiefs			C: Police officers		
Insignia								
Rank	Directeur principal de police municipale	Directeur de police municipal	Chef de service principal de 1e classe	Chef de service principal de 2e classe	Chef de service	Brigadier-chef principal	Brigadier	Gardien
English	Principal police director Chief of police of a department with at least two subordinate police directors	Police director Chief of police of a department with at least 20 sworn officers	Principal chief of police service 1st class	Principal chief of police service 2nd class	Chief of police service	Principal chief brigadier Field supervisor	Brigadier; Police officer with four years service	Guardian; Police officer

== Garde-Champêtre ==
Police ranks of French Rural Police
Category	C: Rural police officers	
Insignia (2017–Present)		
Rank (2017–Present)	Garde champêtre chef principal	Garde champêtre chef
English	Principal Chief Rural Warden	Chief Rural Warden

== Police de l'environnement ==
Insignia					
Function	Directeur général (Director General)	Directeur général délégué - directeur général adjoint (Deputy Director General, Assistant Director General)	Directeur - directeur régional ou interrégional - délégué mer (Director - regional or interregional director - sea delegate)	Directeur adjoint - directeur régional ou interrégional adjoint - directeur délégué de parc national marin - chargé de mission à la direction de l'évaluation et de la transformation; chargé de mission à l'inspection santé et sécurité au travail (Deputy Director - Deputy Regional or Interregional Director - Deputy Director of the National Marine Park - Project Manager at the Evaluation and Transformation Directorate; Project Manager at the Work Health and Safety Inspection)	Directeur adjoint de parc national marin - chef de service national, régional ou interrégional, départemental ou interdépartemental - responsable national - chef de pôle des brigades mobiles d'intervention - chef de service de parc national marin - chef d'unité spécialisée migrateurs (Deputy Director of a National Marine Park - Head of National, Regional or Interregional, Departmental or Interdepartmental Service - National Manager - Head of Mobile Intervention Brigades Unit - Head of the National Marine Park Service - Head of Specialized Migratory Unit)

Insignia				
Function	Chef de service adjoint national, régional ou interrégional, départemental ou interdépartemental - chef de brigade de inspecteurs du permis de chasser - chargé de recherche - chargé de mission de recherche - chef de brigade de la direction des grands prédateurs terrestres (National, regional or interregional, departmental or interdepartmental deputy head of service - head of hunting license inspector brigade - research officer - research mission officer - head of brigade of the large land predators department)	Conservateur de réserve - chef d'unité de service départemental ou interdépartemental, de parc national marin, d'unité spécialisée migrateurs - chef de brigade mobile d'intervention - chef de brigade adjoint de la direction des grands prédateurs terrestres (Curator of nature reserve - head of departmental or interdepartmental service unit, marine national park, specialized migratory unit - head of mobile intervention brigade - deputy head of brigade of the large land predators department)	Agent de service de police ou de service connaissances national, régional ou interrégional et départemental ou interdépartemental (Officer of police service or of national, regional or of interregional and departmental or interdepartmental knowledge service )	Agent stagiaire (Trainee Officer)
