= Anspessade =

French military officer

An anspessade, or lanspessade, was a kind of officer in the French foot soldiers between the 16th and 17th centuries, ranking below the corporals yet above the common sentinels.

There are usually four or five in each company. The term is formed of the Italian lancia spezzata ("broken lance"), used because they were originally disbanded gendarmes, horsemen in full armor, who for want of other subsistence sued for a place of some distinction in the infantry.
