= Ingénieur des études et techniques de travaux maritimes =

The ingénieurs des études et techniques de travaux maritimes (engineer for studies and techniques of naval constructions) was an officer corps of the French Navy. The uniform was a standard Navy officer uniform, with pearl-grey stripes.

These engineers designed, direct and inspected all the high-qualification projects for infrastructure of the Ministry of Defence. Historically attached to the construction service of the Navy, they have been attached to the infrastructure service of National Defence at its creation in September 2005. They worked on building sites, in headquarters and with expeditionary forces abroad.

Recruitment was performed by the École Nationale des Travaux Maritimes (ENTM, National School for Naval Constructions). Students were recruited by a competitive exam open to students of the preparatory classes of the best engineering grandes écoles. The courses comprised one year for naval officer training, followed by three years at the École Nationale des Travaux Publics de l'État.

This corps of engineers is extinct since September 31, 2014, and has been replaced by the joint corps of military engineers of infrastructure (French: ingénieurs militaires de l'infrastructure).

== Officers ==
=== Officiers généraux — (Flag officers) ===
Ingénieur général de 2ème classe
(General engineer 2nd class)

Ingénieur général de 1ère classe
(General engineer 1st class)

=== Officiers supérieurs — (Senior officers) ===
Ingénieur principal
(Principal engineer)

Ingénieur en chef de 2ème classe
(Chief engineer 2nd class)

Ingénieur en chef de 1ère classe
(Chief engineer 1st class)

=== Officiers subalternes (Junior officers) ===
aspirant

ingénieur de 3ème classe
(engineer 3rd class)

ingénieur de 2ème classe
(engineer 2nd class)

ingénieur de 1ère classe
(engineer 1st class)
