= Major (France) =

Military rank in France

Major Major
- French army, navy and air force insignia
- Country: France; See others
- Service branch: Armed Forces
- Rank group: Non-commissioned officer
- NATO rank code: OR-9
- Formation: 1972
- Next lower rank: Adjudant-chef (army & air force); Maître principal (navy)

Related articles
- History: Sergeant major

Major (French pronunciation: [maʒɔʁ]) is the seniormost non-commissioned officer rank in France and other Francophone countries. Unlike most other countries which use the old European rank system, France uses Commandant (Note: The rank is also referred to as Chef de bataillon in the infantry, and Chef d'escadrons in the Cavalry Corps.) as its lowest ranking senior officer.

While the rank functions of major (Major) in France, can be similarly compared to that of a sergeant major, (Note: French rank, sergent-major, existed until 1971 and could come close to, but is not like the French rank of major.) it is higher (rank of major) than a chief warrant officer (Adjudant-Chef), and similar to a master chief (depending on the service branch of the respective country); the rank of major (Major) is still different.

Major was a senior superior officer rank first, with a history of various military traditions in various corps, then recently in time became attached to the sub-officer (non-commissioned) corps as of 2009.

The rank of major (Note: not to be confused with the rank of major in most English-speaking nations, whose French official equivalent is Commandant.) (Major) of the French Armed Forces can be the closest equivalent in terms of authenticity, and even still different, to the American referral of mustang officers, since the rank of "major" was already a superior Officer (Officier Supérieur) (a superior combat military officer rank ascended through the enlisted corps by service or promotions in combat units until 2009) (Note: In the case of French Majors serving in specialized combatants units of the French Armed Forces, Majors of the French Foreign Legion (Les Major de Légion) and Foreign Legion Officers (both French and non-French) (Officiers du Rang de La Légion) seconded from the ranks of the Legionnaires.) which was part of the "Corps of Majors", situated between the French Officer Corps and the French Non-Commissioned Officer Corps. However, the history rank of the Majors of France (Les Majors de France) is still very different.

In the French Armed Forces, the official rank and referral of major Major) (Note: pronounced the same way in the French language with different pronunciation accentuation on the letters "a" and "o".) included the same rank designation across the board, this time, however, as of 2009, attached to the non-commissioned ranks (sub-officer corps) of the French Army, the ranks of the French Navy, the ranks of the French Air Force and ranks of the National Gendarmerie of the National Police.

== History ==
=== Superior officer ===
In the Armies of France of the Ancien Régime, the Major was the second of the colonel charged with the administrative works of the regiment, as well as the commandment of a strong influential position after the Governor and the Lieutenant of the King.

During the Napoleonic Period, the rank of lieutenant-colonel was replaced with the rank of Major. The designation of Major or Medical Major, with category rank sub-classes (1st Class Major, 2nd Class Major, Aide-Major, and Deputy Aide-Major) designated until 1928 a Military Medic.

In the French War Navy of the 18th century, a rank of Major of the Vessel existed briefly and was situated between the rank of Ship-of-the-line lieutenant and Ship-of-the-line captain. The position rank of Major also designated the general officer in charge of maintaining the materials and security of a port or naval base, the position was known as the "Major" General of the Arsenals. In a squadron, the Squadron Major, was a general officer as Ship-of-the-line captain, and upheld the function of the general staff headquarters of the squadron.

The actual organization of the Armies instituted, first in the military hierarchy, a function (not a rank) of Major General for the ensemble of the branches.

Equally, exposed here forth in the non-commissioned officer section, the rank of Major (Major), is heir to the former rank of Major-Adjudant, is the most elevated rank in the non-commissioned officers of the French Army, the French Air Force, French Navy, and Gendarmerie Nationale. Until 2009, there existed the Corps of Majors which was situated between the French Officers Corps and the French Non-Commissioned Officer Corps. In the French Navy, this was related to the Corps of Majors of the Equipment of the Fleet, since the demotion (following a national political policy to reduce the number of corps in the public function...), a Major in the French Navy is no longer a Major of the Equipment of the Fleet, but became a Major in the Petty Officer Corps of the French Navy. However, the insignia of the Major was kept and is represented by 2 crossed anchors, symbols of equipments of the Fleet.

=== Sub-officer ===
The actual designation of "Major" in the French Armed Forces corresponds to a contraction of the composed term "Adjudant-Major": the rank is the most elevated rank in the Sub-officer corps; which existed since 1972. A rank of "Sergeant Major" existed until 1971, under various form designations, and in certain cases, that rank could come close to the actual rank of Major. The first Major of France (Major de France) was Raymond Delaveau and the youngest Major of France would become his son, Thierry Delaveau.

==== Major of France ====
In 1972, simultaneously at the creation of the rank, was created the Corps of Majors in order to enable non-commissioned officers to occupy the equivalent posts of Officers (An Officer Corps below the rank of Commandant or equivalent across the member armed forces). This intermediary corps between the officers and that of the non-commissioned officers, actually included only one rank: that rank function was dissolved in 2009.

Since this date, the rank of Major is the most senior elevated rank, attached this time however to the non-commissioned officer corps of the French Army, the French Air Force, the National Gendarmerie – The Major of the Gendarmerie, is the most elevated rank of Non-Commissioned Officer Corps of the French Navy.

The rank insignia for the French Army, the National Gendarmerie, the French Air Force feature a red border joined by a braid. For the arms dites à pied (on foot), the rank insignia and braid is yellow (accordingly retaking the insignia of Adjudant-Chef) as portrayed. For the mounted arms, heir to the cavalry corps, they are white. For the French Navy, the rank insignia is that of a Principal Master surmounted by two golden anchors.

=== Majors of France ===
The Majors of France are officially addressed and designated as follows:

- French Navy
  - Major of the French Navy (Major de la Marine)
- French Army
  - Major of the French Army (Major de l'Armée de Terre) (Note: In reference to the French personnel that have served an entire career in the French Army.)
  - Major of the Foreign Legion (Major de la Légion étrangère) (Note: In reference to the few foreign (Non-French), eventually probably naturalized, and mainly Frenchmen that served an entire life career exclusively in the French Foreign Legion.)
- French Air Force
  - Major of the French Air Force (Major de l'Armée de l'Air)
Major in the French Navy, superior to Maître principal and inferior to Aspirant

Major in the French Army, superior to Adjudant-chef and inferior to Aspirant

Major in the French Air Force, superior to Adjudant-chef and inferior to Aspirant
- National Gendarmerie including Departmental, Mobile, the French Republican Guard, main security branches, military police and specialized formations such as the GIGN.
  - Major of the National Gendarmerie (Major de Gendarmerie)
Major in the National Gendarmerie, superior to Adjudant-chef and inferior to Aspirant

The same official designation applies to the subordinate ranks (except for subordinate ranks of major in the French Navy) of major, those of chief warrant officer (Adjudant-chef) (principal master in the French Navy) and warrant officer (Adjudant), particularly, specialized combatant units of the French Armed Forces.

The rank major (Major) ceased to exist with the Fire services in France (pompiers) since April 20, 2012.

== Law enforcement ==
Police

- Major of the Police (Major de Police) (in the French National Police which includes several directorates, inspection, services, various security groups, and specialized units such as the RAID).

Prisons

- Major of the Penitentiary Administration (Major pénitentiaire) (in the French Penitentiary Administration Directorate)

Fire service

- Decree Law n° 2012-519 of April 20, 2012 abolished the rank of Major in the Fire services in France.

== Major in other countries ==
(Benin Army)

(Malagasy Army)

(Malian Army)

(Niger Army)

(Togolese Army)

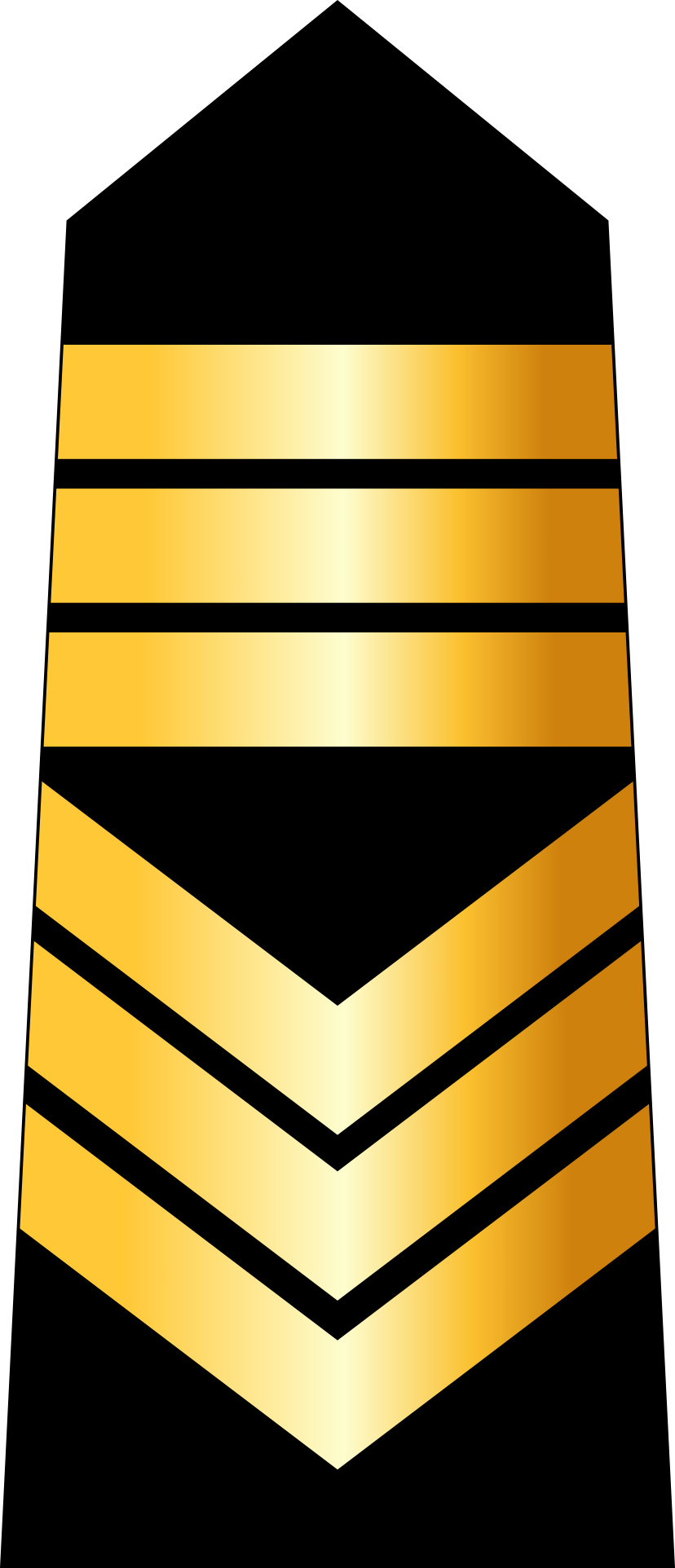
(Arabic: وكيل أعلى, romanized: Wakil 'aelaa)
(Tunisian Army)

== See also ==
- Governor (Les Invalides, France)
- Lieutenant-General (France)
- Ranks in the French Army
- Ranks in the French Navy
- Ranks in the French Air Force
- Police ranks of France
