= Ranks in the French Air and Space Force =

Rank insignia in the French Air and Space Force are worn on the sleeve or on shoulder marks of uniforms

== Officers ==
Although they all wear the same insignia and titles, officers are divided into:

- Regular officers of the air force
- Officers of the Armed Forces Commisariat Corps
- Officers of the technical and administrative corps of the armed forces

=== Généraux - general officers ===
NATO rank	Rank insignia		Name		Description
NATO rank	Shoulder	Sleeve	French	English translation	Description
OF-9			Général d'armée aérienne	Air army general	In command of an air force.
OF-8			Général de corps aérien	Air corps general	In command of an air force corps.
OF-7			Général de division aérienne	Air division general	In command of a division.
OF-6			Général de brigade aérienne	Air brigade general	In command of a brigade, or of a région in the Gendarmerie.

=== Officiers supérieurs - senior officers ===
NATO rank	Rank insignia		Name		Notes
NATO rank	Shoulder	Sleeve	French	English translation	Notes
OF-5			Colonel	Colonel	
OF-4			Lieutenant-colonel	Lieutenant colonel	
OF-3			Commandant	Commandant	Is equivalent to a major in most English-speaking countries.

=== Officiers subalternes - junior officers ===
NATO rank	Rank insignia		Name		Notes
NATO rank	Shoulder	Camouflage	French	English translation	Notes
OF-2			Capitaine	Captain	
OF-1			Lieutenant	Lieutenant	
OF-1			Sous-lieutenant	Sub-lieutenant	
			Aspirant	Aspirant	An Officer Designate rank. Technically it is not a commissioned rank but it is still treated in all respects as one. Aspirants are either officers in training in military academies or voluntaries, serving as temporary officers. The aspirant must have been previously élève officier (Officer Cadet). They can afterwards be commissioned as a sous-lieutenant.
			Élève officier	Officer cadet	A rank held during the first years at the officer academies.

Student
Aspirant élève de l'École de l'air (EA)
(officer candidate, air force academy)

Aspirant élève de l'École militaire de l'air (EMA)
(officer candidate, military flight school)

Élève officier de l'École de l'air (EA)
(officer cadet, air force academy)

Élève officier du personnel navigant (EOPN)
(navigation officer cadet)

=== Sous-officiers - sub-officers, i.e. non-commissioned officers ===
NATO rank	Rank insignia	Name		Notes
NATO rank	Shoulder	French	English translation	Notes
OR-9		Major	Major	The senior sub-officer rank, since 1 January 2009 this grade is attached to the sous-officiers. Prior to this date it was an independent corps between the sous-officiers and the officiers. There are relatively few majors in the army, about one per regiment or brigade. As they could hold equivalent administrative tasks as officiers they are more common in the Armée de l'Air. Note the difference with many army rank systems of other countries where the term major is used for a rank above that of captain. For example, the rank of "major" in the US Army or British army is equivalent to the rank of "commandant" in the French army.
OR-9		Adjudant-chef	Chief Adjutant	Chief Warrant Officer; often same responsibilities as the lieutenant.
OR-8		Adjudant	Adjutant	Warrant Officer; often same responsibilities as an adjudant-chef.
OR-6		Sergent-Chef	Chief sergeant	Addressed as "chef". Typically a platoon second-in-command (equivalent to a Commonwealth sergeant or a US sergeant first class).
OR-5		Sergent	Sergeant	Typically in command of a "group" (i.e. squad; equivalent to a commonwealth corporal or US staff sergeant)
		Élève sous-officier	NCO student	NCO candidates at the EOPN.

Etymologically the adjudant is the adjoint ("joint (assistant)") of an officer, and the sergeant "serves" (Latin: serviens = English: servant).

Aspirants are cadet officers still in training. Sous-lieutenants are junior officers and are often aided by adjudants or adjudants-chefs, who are experienced NCOs/warrant officers.

Full lieutenants are experienced junior officers, served by sergeants when commanding their unit.

A four chevron sergent-chef-major rank existed until 1947. It was a ceremonial rank usually given to the most senior or experienced NCO in a unit, similar to a colour sergeant in the British Army. It was discontinued in the post-war army due to its redundancy.

=== Militaires du rang - Troop ranks ===
NATO rank	Rank insignia	Name		Notes
NATO rank	Shoulder	French	English translation	Notes
OR-4		Caporal-chef	Chief corporal	Often same responsibilities as a sergent.
OR-3		Caporal	Corporal	In command of an équipe - literally a team (fireteam). Presently this size unit is a trinôme in the army.
OR-2		Aviateur de première classe	Aviator first class	
OR-1		Aviateur de deuxième classe	Aviator second class	

There are also distinctions to distinguish volunteers and conscripts, and bars for experience (one for five years, up to four can be obtained).

== Military chaplains ==
Rank	Insignia		
Rank	Christian	Jewish	Muslim
Chief Military Chaplain			
Deputy Chief Military Chaplain			
Regional military chaplain			
Military chaplain			

== See also ==
- French Air Force
