= TSS Cambria (1897) =

Irish Sea ferry, armed boarding steamer, hospital ship, and troop ship

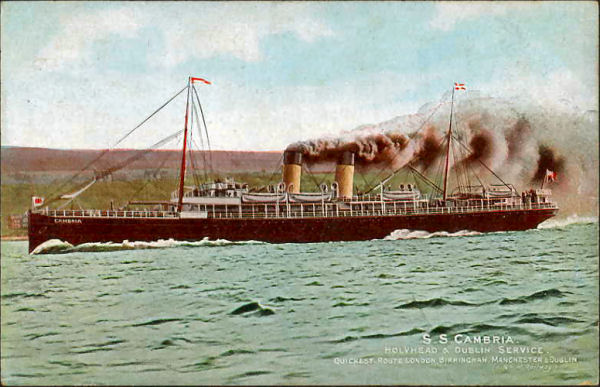
- Postcard of Cambria

History

United Kingdom
- Name: 1897: Cambria; 1921: Arvonia
- Namesake: 1897: Latin name for Wales; 1921: an old name for Caernarfonshire
- Owner: 1897: London and North Western Railway; 1923: London, Midland and Scottish Railway
- Operator: 1914: (United Kingdom) Royal Navy; 1922: (Republic of Ireland) Irish Free State
- Port of registry: 1897: (United Kingdom) Dublin
- Route: 1897: Holyhead – Dublin
- Builder: Wm Denny & Bros, Dumbarton
- Yard number: 574
- Launched: 4 August 1897
- Completed: 1897
- Identification: UK official number 108811; code letters PVRD; by 1914: call sign GRG
- Fate: Scrapped, 1925

General characteristics
- Tonnage: 1,842 GRT, 329 NRT
- Length: 329.0 ft (100.3 m) registered
- Beam: 39.1 ft (11.9 m)
- Depth: 15.8 ft (4.8 m)
- Decks: 2
- Installed power: 2 × triple expansion engines, 425 NHP
- Propulsion: 2 × screws
- Speed: 21 knots (39 km/h)
- Sensors & processing systems: by 1910: submarine signalling
- Notes: sister ships: Hibernia, Anglia, Scotia

TSS Cambria was a UK twin screw passenger steamship. She was launched in Scotland in 1897 for the London and North Western Railway (LNWR). She was requisitioned as an armed boarding steamer in 1914, and converted into a hospital ship in 1915. She was renamed Arvonia in 1921, and passed to the London, Midland and Scottish Railway (LMS) when Britain's railways were grouped in 1923. She was scrapped in 1925.

== Background and description ==
In 1896, the City of Dublin Steam Packet Company introduced the twin screw steamer Ulster, a new ferry that was capable of 24 knots (44 km/h). She could make the crossing between Holyhead to Dublin in 2¾ hours. A sister ship, Munster, was on order from the same builders, Laird Brothers in Birkenhead, and due to be delivered in 1897.

The LNWR responded by ordering a new ferry from William Denny and Brothers of Dumbarton. She was built as yard number 574, launched on 4 August 1897 as Cambria, and completed later that year.

Cambria's registered length was 329.0 ft (100.3 m), her beam was 39.1 ft (11.9 m), and her depth was 15.8 ft (4.8 m). Her tonnages were 1,842 GRT and 329 NRT. She had twin screws, each driven by a four-cylinder triple expansion engine. Their combined power was rated at 425 NHP, and gave her a speed of 21 knots (39 km/h). The LNWR registered her at Dublin. Her UK official number was 108811, and her code letters were PVRD.

== Career ==
In 1899, Denny Brothers launched two more ferries for the LNWR to the same design: Hibernia and Anglia. This made Cambria the lead ship of a class. Denny Brothers launched a fourth member of the class for the LNWR, Scotia, in 1902.

Cambria was equipped with submarine signalling by 1910, and wireless telegraphy by 1912. By 1914, her call sign was GRW.

In August 1914, the Admiralty requisitioned Cambria, and had her converted into an armed boarding steamer. In August 1915 she was converted again, into a hospital ship. She was returned to her owners on 20 January 1919. In 1921, she was renamed Arvonia, which is an old name for Caernarfonshire. This allowed the LNWR to re-use her old name for a new Cambria.

=== Irish Civil War ===
In July 1922, the Irish Free State requisitioned Arvonia as a troopship, along with Lady Wicklow.

During the Battle of Limerick in July 1922, Arvonia landed in Free State troops and equipment at Limerick docks. She then sailed to Dublin, as she was on a list of ships sent to Michael Collins to be used as troopships to land seaborne troops in the rear of Anti-Treaty strongholds in Munster. In Dublin, Arvonia embarked some 400 troops under Colonel-Commandant Christopher (Kit) O'Malley to land in Westport, County Mayo. She steamed around the north coast, and landed them in Clew Bay at dawn on Monday 24 July.

On Monday 7 August, troops under generals Emmet Dalton and Tom Ennis left North Wall, Dublin aboard Arvonia and Lady Wicklow. They made a surprise landing at Passage West, on the south coast of County Cork, the next day.

On 28 August, Arvonia left Limerick Docks carrying prisoners from Limerick Prison including Cornelius McNamara. Her Master was Frank Bolster, a former member of Michael Collins' counter-intelligence assassination squad. On 9 September, the prisoners were disembarked at Dún Laoghaire to be taken to Gormanstown Internment Camp.

At 15:45 hrs on 17 December 1922, Captain Henry Robinson became the last British soldier to leave the Irish Free State, when he and the remaining British troops boarded Arvonia in Dublin.

=== LMS ===
In 1923, the LNWR was absorbed into the new LMS Railway, and Arvonia became part of the new company's fleet. On 11 June 1925, she arrived in Barrow-in-Furness to be broken up by Thos. W. Ward.

== Bibliography ==
- Corbett, Jim (2025). Not While I Have Ammo. Cheltenham: The History Press. ISBN 978-1-80399-904-3.
- Duckworth, Christian; Langmuir, Graham (1968) [1948]. Railway and Other Steamers. Prescot: T Stephenson & Sons.
- Harrington, Niall (1992). Kerry Landing. Dublin: Anvil Books. ISBN 978-0-947962-70-8.
- Lloyd's Register of British and Foreign Shipping. Vol. I.–Steamers. London: Lloyd's Register of Shipping. 1910 – via Internet Archive.
- Lloyd's Register of British and Foreign Shipping. Vol. II.–Steamers. London: Lloyd's Register of Shipping. 1912 – via Internet Archive.
- The Marconi Press Agency Ltd (1914). The Year Book of Wireless Telegraphy and Telephony. London: The Marconi Press Agency Ltd.
- McIvor, Aidan (1994). A History of the Irish Naval Service. Dublin: Irish Academic Press. ISBN 0-7165-2523-2.
- Mercantile Navy List. London: Registrar General of Shipping and Seamen. 1899 – via Crew List Index Project.
