= TSS Scotia (1902) =

Irish Sea ferry, armed boarding steamer, and troop ship

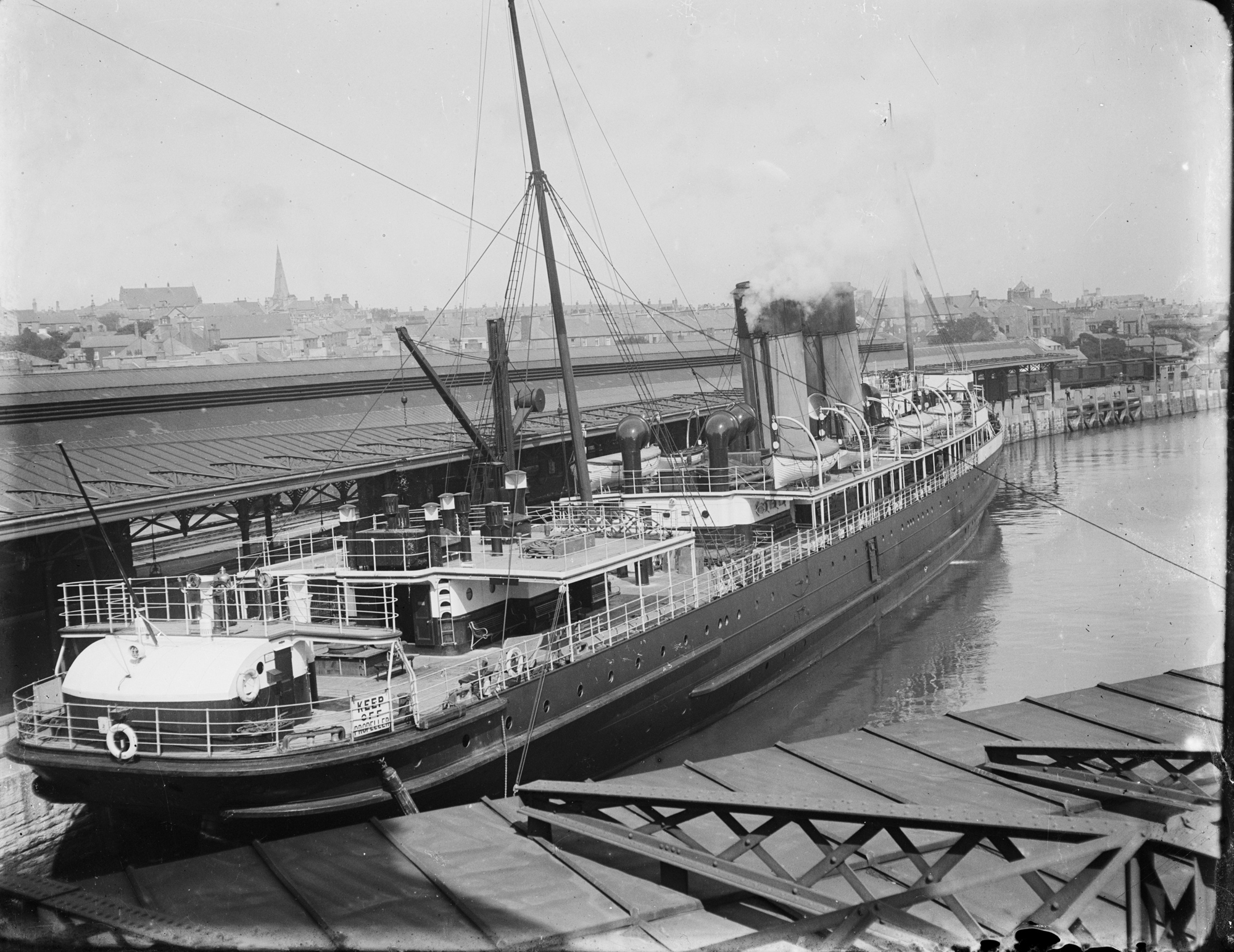
- Scotia berthed in Holyhead

History

United Kingdom
- Name: 1902: Scotia; 1920: Menevia
- Namesake: 1902: Latin name for Scotland; 1920: Latin name for St Davids
- Owner: 1902: London and North Western Railway; 1923: London, Midland and Scottish Railway; 1928: Isle of Man Steam Packet Company
- Operator: 1914: (United Kingdom) Royal Navy
- Port of registry: 1902: (United Kingdom) Dublin
- Builder: Wm Denny & Bros, Dumbarton
- Yard number: 655
- Launched: 11 January 1902
- Maiden voyage: 23 April 1902
- Refit: 1920
- Identification: UK official number 111038; code letters THVK; by 1914: call sign GRR
- Fate: Scrapped in 1928

General characteristics
- Tonnage: 1,872 GRT, 319 NRT
- Length: 330.2 ft (100.6 m)
- Beam: 39.1 ft (11.9 m)
- Depth: 15.7 ft (4.8 m)
- Decks: 2
- Installed power: 2 × triple expansion engines, 425 NHP
- Propulsion: 2 × screws
- Speed: 21 knots (39 km/h)
- Sensors & processing systems: by 1910: submarine signalling
- Notes: sister ships: Cambria, Hibernia, Anglia

TSS Scotia was a UK twin screw passenger steamship. She was launched in Scotland in 1902 for the London and North Western Railway (LNWR). In 1914, the Admiralty requisitioned her, and had her converted into an armed boarding steamer (ABS). In 1917, she was converted into a troopship. She was renamed Menevia in 1919, and passed to the London, Midland and Scottish Railway (LMS) when Britain's railways were grouped in 1923. The Isle of Man Steam Packet Company bought her in 1928, but sold her for scrap later that year.

== Description ==
In 1902, William Denny and Brothers of Dumbarton built a ferry for the LNWR's Irish Sea passenger services. Yard number 655 was launched on 11 January 1902 as Scotia, and completed that April. She was a sister ship for Cambria (1897), Hibernia (1900), and Anglia (1900).

Scotia's registered length was 330.2 ft (100.6 m), her beam was 39.1 ft (11.9 m), and her depth was 15.7 ft (4.8 m). Her tonnages were 1,872 GRT and 319 NRT. She had twin screws, each driven by a four-cylinder triple expansion engine. Their combined power was rated at 425 NHP, and gave her a speed of 21 knots (39 km/h). The LNWR registered her at Dublin. Her UK official number was 111038, and her code letters were THVK.

Scotia was equipped with submarine signalling by 1910, and wireless telegraphy by 1912. By 1914, her call sign was GRW. (Note: The 1914 edition of The Year Book of Wireless Telegraphy and Telephony gives Scotia's owner as Lamport and Holt. This is clearly an error, which is corrected in editions for subsequent years.)

== First World War ==
On 8 August 1914 the Admiralty requisitioned Scotia. She was converted into an ABS for the North Channel Patrol, based at Ayr. On 1 August 1917 she was released from patrol service. She was converted into a troop ship, for carrying British Expeditionary Force troops between Dover and France. On 18 July 1918, she was damaged by bombing at Calais.

== Post-war ==
In 1920 Scotia was refitted. She was renamed Menevia, which is a Latin name for St Davids in Wales. This allowed the LNWR to re-use her old name for a new Scotia.

In 1923, the LNWR was absorbed into the new LMS Railway, and Menevia became part of the new company's fleet. The Isle of Man Steam Packet Company bought her in 1928, but then sold her on to Thos. W. Ward to be broken up. She arrived at Ward's breaking yard in Barrow-in-Furness on 21 November 1928.

== Bibliography ==
- Duckworth, Christian; Langmuir, Graham (1968) [1948]. Railway and Other Steamers. Prescot: T Stephenson & Sons.
- Lloyd's Register of British and Foreign Shipping. Vol. I.–Steamers. London: Lloyd's Register of Shipping. 1910 – via Internet Archive.
- Lloyd's Register of British and Foreign Shipping. Vol. II.–Steamers. London: Lloyd's Register of Shipping. 1912 – via Internet Archive.
- The Marconi Press Agency Ltd (1914). The Year Book of Wireless Telegraphy and Telephony. London: The Marconi Press Agency Ltd.
- The Marconi Press Agency Ltd (1918). The Year Book of Wireless Telegraphy and Telephony. London: The Wireless Press, Ltd.
- Mercantile Navy List. London: Registrar General of Shipping and Seamen. 1903 – via Crew List Index Project.
