= HMHS Anglia =

Irish Sea ferry and WW1 hospital ship

Coordinates: 51°2′N 1°19′E

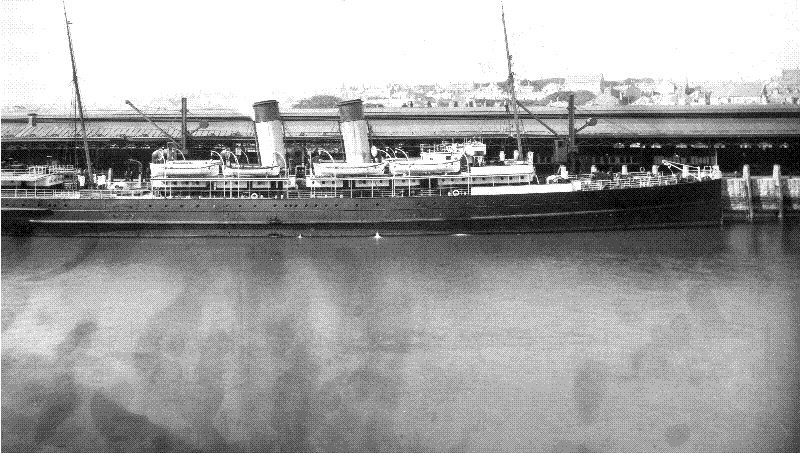
- Anglia in 1905

History

United Kingdom
- Name: Anglia
- Owner: London and North Western Railway
- Operator: 1914: (United Kingdom) Royal Navy
- Port of registry: 1900: (United Kingdom) Dublin
- Route: 1900: Holyhead – Dublin; 1908: Holyhead – Kingstown
- Builder: Wm Denny & Bros, Dumbarton
- Yard number: 619
- Launched: 20 December 1899
- Completed: 10 April 1900
- Identification: UK official number 111031; code letters RPKB; by 1914: call sign GRE
- Fate: Sunk by a mine, 17 November 1915.

General characteristics
- Tonnage: 1,862 GRT, 783 NRT
- Length: 329.0 ft (100.3 m)
- Beam: 39.1 ft (11.9 m)
- Depth: 15.7 ft (4.8 m)
- Installed power: 2 × triple expansion engines, 424 NHP
- Propulsion: 2 × screws
- Speed: 22 knots (41 km/h)
- Capacity: as hospital ship: 275 patients
- Sensors & processing systems: by 1910: submarine signalling
- Notes: sister ships: Cambria, Hibernia, Scotia

SS Anglia was a was a UK twin screw passenger steamship. She was launched in Scotland in 1899 for the London and North Western Railway (LNWR). She was requisitioned as an armed boarding steamer in 1914, and converted into a hospital ship in 1915. On 17 November 1915, a mine laid by a German U-boat sank her in the English Channel.

== Description ==
In 1899 – 1900, William Denny and Brothers of Dumbarton built a pair of passenger ferries for the LNWR. Yard number 618 was launched on 10 October 1899 as Hibernia, yard number 619 was launched on 20 December as Anglia, and both ships were completed in 1900. Both were sister ships of Cambria, which Denny Brothers had built in 1897.

Anglia's registered length was 329.0 ft (100.3 m), her beam was 39.1 ft (11.9 m), and her depth was 15.7 ft (4.8 m). Her tonnages were 1,862 GRT and 783 NRT. She had twin screws, each driven by a four-cylinder triple expansion engine. Their combined power was rated at 424 NHP, and gave her a speed of 22 knots (41 km/h). The LNWR registered her at Dublin. Her UK official number was 111031, and her code letters were RPKB.

At first, her route was between Holyhead and Dublin North Wall. From 1908, her route was between Holyhead and Kingstown (now Dún Laoghaire). She was equipped with submarine signalling by 1910, and wireless telegraphy by 1912. By 1914, her call sign was GRE.

== Loss ==
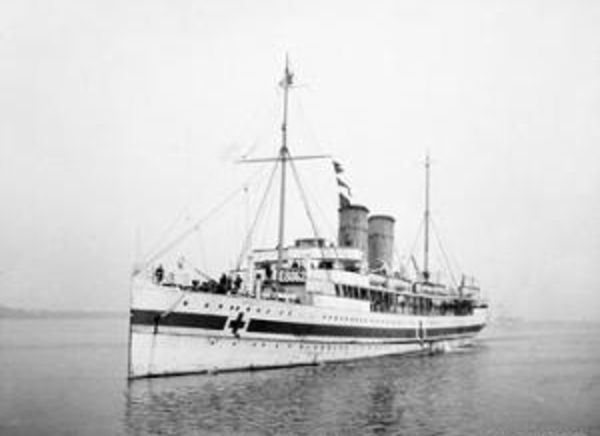
Anglia as a hospital ship

With the outbreak of war in August 1914, Anglia was requisitioned as an armed boarding steamer. In April 1915, she was converted into a hospital ship.

On 17 November 1915, she was returning from Calais to Dover, carrying 390 injured officers and soldiers. At around 12:30 pm, 1 nautical mile (2 km) east of Folkestone Gate, she struck a mine and sank in 15 minutes. It was one of a number of mines laid by the German U-boat UC-5. The nearby torpedo gunboat HMS Hazard helped evacuate the passengers and crew. Despite the assistance of the nearby collier Lusitania, 134 people died in the sinking.

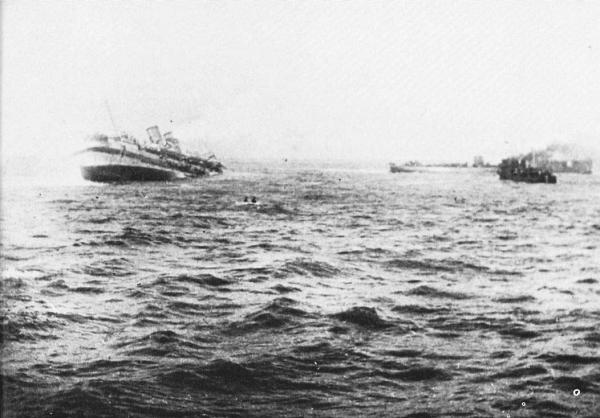
Anglia sinking

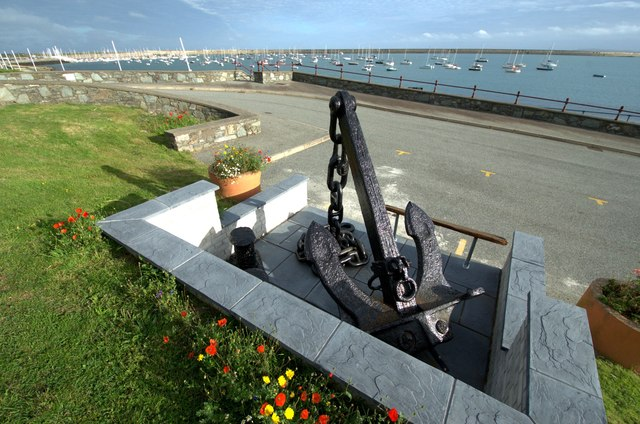
Monument to HMHS Anglia at Holyhead Maritime Museum

Her stockless anchor was made into a monument at Holyhead.

In October 2014, there were calls for Anglia's wreck to be designated a war grave, which would protect it under the Protection of Military Remains Act, 1986. The declaration was made in March 2017, making it illegal to remove or disturb any human remains at the wreck site.

== See also ==
- List of hospital ships sunk in World War I

== Bibliography ==
- Duckworth, Christian; Langmuir, Graham (1968) [1948]. Railway and Other Steamers. Prescot: T Stephenson & Sons.
- Lloyd's Register of British and Foreign Shipping. Vol. I.–Steamers. London: Lloyd's Register of Shipping. 1910 – via Internet Archive.
- Lloyd's Register of British and Foreign Shipping. Vol. II.–Steamers. London: Lloyd's Register of Shipping. 1912 – via Internet Archive.
- The Marconi Press Agency Ltd (1914). The Year Book of Wireless Telegraphy and Telephony. London: The Marconi Press Agency Ltd.
- Mercantile Navy List. London: Registrar General of Shipping and Seamen. 1901 – via Crew List Index Project.
