= TSS Hibernia (1899) =

Irish Sea ferry and WW1 armed boarding steamer

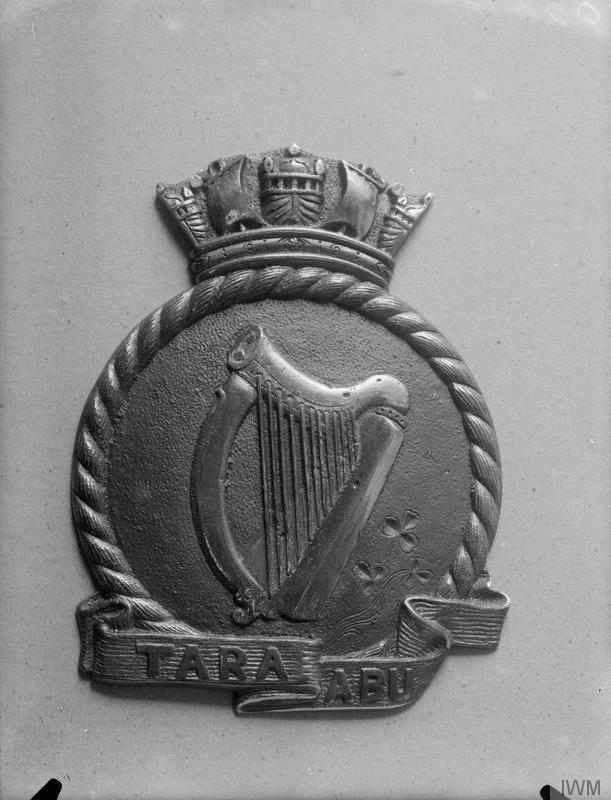
- Tara's ship's badge

History

United Kingdom
- Name: 1899: TSS Hibernia; 1914: HMS Tara
- Namesake: 1899: Latin name for Ireland; 1914: Hill of Tara
- Owner: London and North Western Railway
- Operator: 1914: (United Kingdom) Royal Navy
- Port of registry: 1900: (United Kingdom) Dublin
- Route: 1900: Holyhead – Dublin
- Builder: Wm Denny & Bros, Dumbarton
- Yard number: 618
- Launched: 10 October 1899
- Completed: 1900
- Identification: UK official number 111027; code letters RLWT; by 1914: call sign GRW
- Fate: Sunk by torpedo, 5 November 1915

General characteristics
- Type: passenger ferry
- Tonnage: 1,862 GRT, 783 NRT
- Length: 329.0 ft (100.3 m) registered
- Beam: 39.1 ft (11.9 m)
- Depth: 15.7 ft (4.8 m)
- Decks: 2
- Installed power: 2 × triple expansion engines, 425 NHP
- Propulsion: 2 × screws
- Speed: 22 knots (41 km/h)
- Sensors & processing systems: by 1910: submarine signalling
- Armament: 3 × 6-pounder guns
- Notes: sister ships: Cambria, Anglia, Scotia

TSS Hibernia was a UK twin screw passenger steamship. She was launched in Scotland in 1899 for the London and North Western Railway (LNWR). In 1914, the Admiralty requisitioned her, had her converted into an armed boarding steamer, and commissioned her as HMS Tara. A U-boat sank her by torpedo in the Mediterranean in November 1915. Her crew survived, but spent four months as prisoners of the Senussi in Cyrenaica (now part of Libya), until British Army unit rescued them in 1916.

== Description ==
In 1899 – 1900, William Denny and Brothers of Dumbarton built a pair of passenger ferries for the LNWR. Yard number 618 was launched on 10 October 1899 as Hibernia, yard number 619 was launched on 20 December as Anglia, and both ships were completed in 1900. Both were sister ships of Cambria, which Denny Brothers had built in 1897.

Hibernia's registered length was 329.0 ft (100.3 m), her beam was 39.1 ft (11.9 m), and her depth was 15.7 ft (4.8 m). Her tonnages were 1,862 GRT and 783 NRT. She had twin screws, each driven by a four-cylinder triple expansion engine. Their combined power was rated at 425 NHP, and gave her a speed of 22 knots (41 km/h). The LNWR registered her at Dublin. Her UK official number was 111027, and her code letters were RLWT.

Hibernia entered service in January 1900, on the LNWR's route between Dublin and Holyhead. She was equipped with submarine signalling by 1910, and wireless telegraphy by 1912. By 1914, her call sign was GRW.

== HMS Tara ==
In 1914 the Admiralty requisitioned Hibernia, and had her converted into an armed boarding steamer. She was armed with three 6-pounder guns. The Royal Navy already had an HMS Hibernia, so the converted ferry was commissioned her as HMS Tara.

U-35 torpedoed her in Sollum Bay on the Egyptian coast on 5 November 1915. The U-boat saved Hibernia's crew, and handed them over to Senussi tribesmen as prisoners of war (POWs). On 14 March 1916 they were being held at Bir Hakeim along with the crew of HMT Moorina, a horse transport. They were rescued by the Duke of Westminster's armoured car brigade, part of the Western Frontier Force. Tara's commanding officer at this time was Captain R Gwatkin-Williams, RN.

Captain Gwatkin-Williams told the story of Tara's in his book Prisoners of the Red Desert, Being a Full and True History of the Men of the Tara. The POWs were not held in a traditional POW camp, but rather at a desert oasis guarded by a few Turks and Arabs. Although only loosely guarded their escape was prevented by the surrounding desert and their general lack of food and water. Near the end of their captivity, inspired by their hopeless situation, Captain Gwatkin-Williams did attempt escape. After walking through the desert for two days he blundered into an Arab camp while walking at night and was recaptured and returned to Bir Hakeim.

After accidentally finding a letter from Captain Gwatkin-Williams to a Turkish officer stating the desperation of the situation at Bir Hakeim, the Duke set off to find the POWs. With a guide who had been to Bir Hakeim as a boy some 30 years previously, he set off across the desert estimating that he was about 70 miles (110 km) away. Passing the 70 mile estimate and running low on fuel he kept going as long as there was any hope, finding the camp after traversing 115 miles (185 km). Captain Gwatkin-Williams estimated the prisoners were only a few days from death, due to starvation when the Duke of Westminster rescued them.

== Bibliography ==
- Duckworth, Christian; Langmuir, Graham (1968) [1948]. Railway and Other Steamers. Prescot: T Stephenson & Sons.
- Gwatkin-Williams, RS (1919). Prisoners of the Red Desert, Being a Full and True History of the Men of the Tara. London: Thornton Butterworth, Ltd. LCCN 20000291. OCLC 7013404.
- Lloyd's Register of British and Foreign Shipping. Vol. I.–Steamers. London: Lloyd's Register of Shipping. 1910 – via Internet Archive.
- Lloyd's Register of British and Foreign Shipping. Vol. II.–Steamers. London: Lloyd's Register of Shipping. 1912 – via Internet Archive.
- The Marconi Press Agency Ltd (1914). The Year Book of Wireless Telegraphy and Telephony. London: The Marconi Press Agency Ltd.
- Mercantile Navy List. London: Registrar General of Shipping and Seamen. 1901 – via Crew List Index Project.
- Rolls, SC (1937). Steel Chariots in the Desert. The Story of an Armoured-Car Driver with the Duke of Westminster in Libya and in Arabia with T. E. Lawrence. London: Jonathan Cape.
