= Cornelius McNamara =

Irish republican (1896–1957)

Cornelius "Connie" McNamara
- Born: 6 April 1896; Limerick, Ireland
- Died: 15 December 1957 (aged 61); Clan Morris Ave, Limerick, Ireland
- Military career
- Allegiance: Irish Republican Army; Irish Republican Brotherhood
- Service years: 1915–1923
- Rank: Captain
- Commands: Officer commanding 'A' Company; Second Battalion Mid-Limerick Brigade
- Conflicts: Irish War of Independence; Irish Civil War

Cornelius McNamara, better known as Connie (Mackey) Mc Namara, (6 April 1896 – 15 December 1957) was the Captain of "A" Company Active Service Unit of the Second Battalion Mid Limerick Brigade in the Irish Republican Army during the Irish War of Independence.

== Early life ==
Cornelius McNamara was born in Limerick city, the son of a butcher. He was educated for a period in the Christian Brothers School in Sexton Street, Limerick. He left the school around 1910 and took up an apprenticeship in one of the four large bacon factories in Limerick. When Padraig Pearse and Roger Casement came to Limerick in early 1914 to raise Volunteer companies, the seeds were planted in Cornelius' mind to join the movement later on.

== Volunteers ==
In October 1915, he enlisted in "C" Company Limerick City Battalion under Michael Colivet, and was present at Killonan with the rest of his battalion during the Easter Rising, but after hearing word that the Rising was called off, the battalion marched back to Limerick. Soon after, the Battalion split and he then joined "A" Company of the newly formed Second Battalion. His home then became the battalion dispatch centre and he was admitted to the ranks of the Irish Republican Brotherhood. In February 1918, he was promoted to Second Lieutenant of ‘A’ Company, and later on in November 1918 he was promoted again to first Lieutenant.

== War of Independence ==
When the Irish War of Independence started on 6 April 1919, Cornelius became part of 'A' Company's Active Service Unit. On the same day, he was part of the attempted rescue of Robert Byrne, Adjutant of the Second Battalion from the City Home in Limerick. Byrne was mortally wounded and became the first Republican fatality of the Irish War of Independence. He was promoted to Captain in November 1919 and became leader of the 'A' Company Active Service Unit. On 17 July 1920, he was arrested with 4 or 5 members of his ASU collecting funds in Garryowen. He was imprisoned in Limerick Prison, Cork Male Gaol, Winchester Gaol, and Birmingham Prison until 25 February 1921. He was then re-arrested soon after his release on 8 April on suspicion of killing a Black and Tan. Then incarcerated in Limerick Prison, Cork Male Gaol, Spike Island and Maryborough Convict Prison (Portlaoise) he remained in Maryborough until 9 December 1921 where he was released under a general amnesty of the Anglo-Irish Treaty of 6 December 1921.

== Civil War ==
McNamara fought on the Republican side in the Irish Civil War (1922–1923). He was made commandant of the Strand Barracks in Limerick in March 1922.

From 15 to 20 July, the Barracks was attacked by Free State troops under Michael Brennan. After a five-day siege, he surrendered and was imprisoned in Limerick Prison and then transported by the ship Arvonia to be interned in Gormanston Internment Camp. While he was in Limerick prison and aboard the Arvonia he was elected prisoners' commandant. While he was in Gormanston he was on the prisoners camp council. He was transferred from Gormonston Internment Camp in late November 1923 to Mountjoy Prison. Where he remained until he was released on 23 December 1923.

== Subsequent IRA career ==
After the defeat of the anti-Treaty Irish Republican Army (IRA) in the Civil War. He became secretary of the Limerick branch for the Irish Republican Prisoners' Dependents Fund (IRPDF) from 1924 to 1925, which assisted Republican Prisoners families. He was forced to emigrate to Chicago and New York City in both 1925 and 1930 by Free State sympathisers, and took no further part in any more IRA activities.

== Death and Biography ==
He died at home in 1957 and was survived by his second wife May (née Moakley) and only daughter Patricia Corbett. His grandson Jim Corbett chronicled his life with the 2008 hardback biography Not While I Have Ammo which was launched in the Hilton (Strand) Hotel Limerick on March 14, 2008, and the Connie Mackey website. Both a revised and expanded paperback and Ebook versions were published on 28 August 2025.
