= Charles Bricogne =

Free French army officer (1913–1942)

Bricogne between 1936 and 1940.

Charles Bricogne (8 July 1913 – 11 June 1942) was a French officer in the Free French Forces. He distinguished himself at Halfaya Pass and the battle of Bir Hakeim and was killed at the latter. He is a Companion of the Order of the Liberation (by a decree dated 11 May 1943 ) and a Knight of the Legion of Honour and was awarded the Croix de Guerre 1939–1945 with bronze palms and the Resistance Medal with rosette (by a decree dated 24 April 1946.).

== Family ==
The Bricogne family coat of arms.

He was one of colonel Alfred Emmanuel Bricogne's children with his wife Édith Marie Edmée Labouré – he was their eldest child. Via her mother, Labouré's mother was a granddaughter of Édith Royer, whilst Labouré's brother Joseph (1898 – 19 July 1918) was an officer candidate in the 7th Field Artillery Regiment and was killed at Villers-Hélon on the second day of the Allies' final offensive of the First World War.

Charles' younger brother Michel (1914 – 21 May 1940) attended the École spéciale militaire de Saint-Cyr and became a career officer in the army. He died in combat at Berneville during the Battle of Arras as a Lieutenant in the 11th Mounted Dragoon Regiment.

== Life ==
=== Education ===
He was born in Quincy-le-Vicomte in Côte-d'Or and attended the Jesuit-run Saint-Clément College in Metz before joining the preparatory class at the Lycée privé Sainte-Geneviève in Versailles. He then entered the École polytechnique as part of the class of 1932. He graduated in 1934 as fortieth in his class Like one in two graduates of the École Polytechnique in the 1930-1940 period he decided to begin an active career in the army. He thus attended the School of Applied Artillery at Fontainebleau, graduating valedictorian and choosing to join the 73rd Artillery Regiment at Lunéville.

=== Battle for France ===
As of May 1940 he was a captain of 3rd Battery in 73rd Regiment. His regiment was then attached to the 2nd Light Cavalry Division and resisted an important German tank column near Sedan before retreating from Sedan to Haute-Normandie coast. During that retreat 3rd Battery took part in several counter-attacks, destroying several German tanks and gaining Bricogne a mention in despatches. The regiment fought at Abbeville from 27 May to 4 June 1940 with 4th Armoured Division – that division was then commanded by général de Gaulle.

Bricogne's regiment, other French units and 51st Highland Division were unable to reach Fécamp or Le Havre to be evacuated across the English Channel and so instead made for the smaller port of Saint-Valery-en-Caux. This led them to be encircled by 7th Panzer Division under Erwin Rommel. The Germans besieged and bombarded Saint-Valery-en-Caux for several days, making it impossible for the units to board ships – they had also run out of ammunition.

On 12 June Bricogne and four other officers managed to get out of the Saint-Valery-en-Caux pocket but they decided to split up so as to be less visible to the enemy. Bricogne put on civilian clothing and tried to reach Britain via Dieppe, then by crossing the river Seine at Caudebec to get back to the French forces still fighting. After both those attempts failed he walked 200 kilometres to Paris, avoiding main roads and large towns. From there he bicycled to Burgundy and Clermont-Ferrand.

Bricogne was stupefied then angered by the fall of France, but he turned that anger into action, as shown in his letters, now in the Museum of the Order of Liberation. He refused to accept the defeat and to think of his country as having abandoned the fight. Wishing to get back into battle, at the end of 1940 he gained a posting to Syria, where he served under colonel Philibert Collet and commanded a squadron of Circassians.

=== Free French Forces ===
At the beginning of April 1941, a pro-German faction, encouraged by British weakness in the Middle East, took power in Irak. On 6 May 1941 the Germans decided to help Rashid Ali al-Gaylani, the leader of the Iraqi government who had rebelled against British control of Iraq. On the same day the head of the Vichy administration admiral Darlan gave permission for Luftwaffe Messerschmitt Bf 110s and Heinkel 111s to use the French military airbase in Aleppo, northern Syria, to support that rebellion. General Henri Dentz, the Vichy commander in Syria, also made a major show of collaboration with the Germans by sending the Germans' Iraqi allies 52 aircraft fuel tankers, 455 tonnes of weapons and munitions, a battery of 75 mm guns and a battery of 155 mm guns.

As a result of these decisions Bricogne decided to desert to the Free French Forces on the night of 21–22 May 1941. He clearly explained his motivation in a letter to his family:

I have been in general de Gaulle's army since the night of 21–22 May. We crossed the frontier that night with many comrades, judging that the [French] Army of Syria was no longer doing anything useful, since its commanders accepted lending Syria to the Germans [for operations] against England.

I am more and more convinced that general de Gaulle is right; the French government abandoning [the Allies] time after time makes one believe that it is not being cunning but instead a convinced collaborator.

It is suicide and what's more it is dishonourable. Finally it is absurd for we are going to win the war and this [collaboration] policy delays [the war's] end and puts present-day France in the worst possible situation.

Commander Jean-Claude Laurent-Champrosay put Bricogne in charge of forming and training 2nd Group of 1st Free French Artillery Regiment (1st RAFFL).

1st Regiment left for the Libyan Desert in December 1941 as part of general Pierre Koenig's 1st Free French Brigade There Bricogne fought bravely and boldy at the head of his group against Italian divisions and the Afrikakorps, particularly at Halfaya Pass, where he shelled the enemy. Bricogne took part in the Jock columns, which involved mixed units with infantry, 75 mm guns, machine guns and engineers. Those mixed units heavily harassed and attacked German and Italian military convoys in the Libyan Desert.

=== Bir Hakeim ===
The Battle of Bir Hakeim broke out on 27 May 1942. During it Bricogne was second in command of 1st Free French Artillery Regiment. That regiment successfully drove back several enemy armoured assaults and was the main contributor to holding the position throughout the battle.

After fifteen days' battle outnumbered ten to one, Koenig decided on 10 June that 1st Brigade would make a breakout in force from its entrenched positions, intending to clear a way through hand-to-hand fighting, break out of the encirclement and escape. He came to this decision as water and munitions were running low and he was suffering heavy losses, but he needed to continue resisting so that the British Eighth Army could escape its own encirclement, retire towards Egypt in good order and regroup there. (Eighth Army was able to withdraw and a few weeks after Bir Hakeim formed a solid defence line at El Alamein 110 km from Alexandria.)

Late on the night of 10 June commander Jean-Claude Laurent-Champrosay, head of 1st Artillery Regiment, and his second-in-command Bricogne gathered their vehicles and eight 75 mm guns (the latter being the only survivors of their original twenty-four). They would have to cross the Afrikakorps lines by night and save as much matériel as they could. Bricogne inspected the whole column and everything was in order.

The infantry had already began marching out after the engineers had de-mined the route. The enemy spotted them too soon and launched signal flares and in that light the regiment's pace broke down, advancing in fits and starts into an active minefield, among burning vehicles, the cries of the wounded and dying and enemy automatic weapons fire. Bricogne was wounded in the head, throat, legs and lungs during the sortie while trying to take a machine gun nest.

A German ambulance picked him up in the early morning but he died a few hours later. He was buried in the desert and his grave has never been found. The Red Cross confirmed his death to his family back in France in November 1942.

== Reception ==
He was mentioned by de Gaulle in his Mémoires de guerre as one of the three senior officers killed at Bir Hakeim (the others being lieutenant-colonel Broche and commander Savey), whilst Koenig's book on Bir Hakeim praises his aggressive attitude to the enemy and his charismatic way with his subordinates.

The historian Henri de Wailly wrote a pen-portrait of him based on an interview with colonel Salin, then another officer in the 73rd Regiment:

This convinced Christian, with very short hair, a Bourbon nose, with a colourful complexion, gifted with an uncommon energy, he lost weight in order to ride a horse competitively. After the collapse of Saint-Valéry-en-Caux he escaped by bicycle, reached Free France and died at Bir Hakeim.

That historian also describes his attitude towards 22nd Colonial Infantry Regiment's retreat at the Battle of Abbeville – he had picked up a machine gun and threatened to shoot anyone retreating.

Officers and soldiers who fought under Bricogne at Bir Hakeim such as Paul Morlon and Jean-Mathieu Boris have also left vivid accounts of him. They praised how he trained them and his panache commanding Jock columns in the Libyan Desert before the siege.

== Bibliography (in French) ==
- Trouplin, Vladimir; Bradfer, Marc; Sarkozy, Nicolas; Jacob, François (2010). Dictionnaire des compagnons de la Libération (in French). Bordeaux: Elytis. ISBN 978-2-35639-033-2. OCLC 650759837.
- Pierre Dufour, Le 1er régiment d'artillerie de marine, Lavauzelle, 2005.
- Jean-Christophe Notin (2000). 1061 Compagnons - histoire des Compagnons de la Libération. Paris: Perrin. ISBN 2-262-01606-2..

== External links (in French) ==
- "Louis Adolphe Ambroise Bricogne's family tree". Geneanet.
- "Order of the Liberation biography of Charles Bricogne".
- "Charles Bricogne 1913-1942 (X1932)". X-Résistance.
