= Bir Hakeim rescue =

1916 British rescue of POWs in Libya

- Part of the Senussi campaign
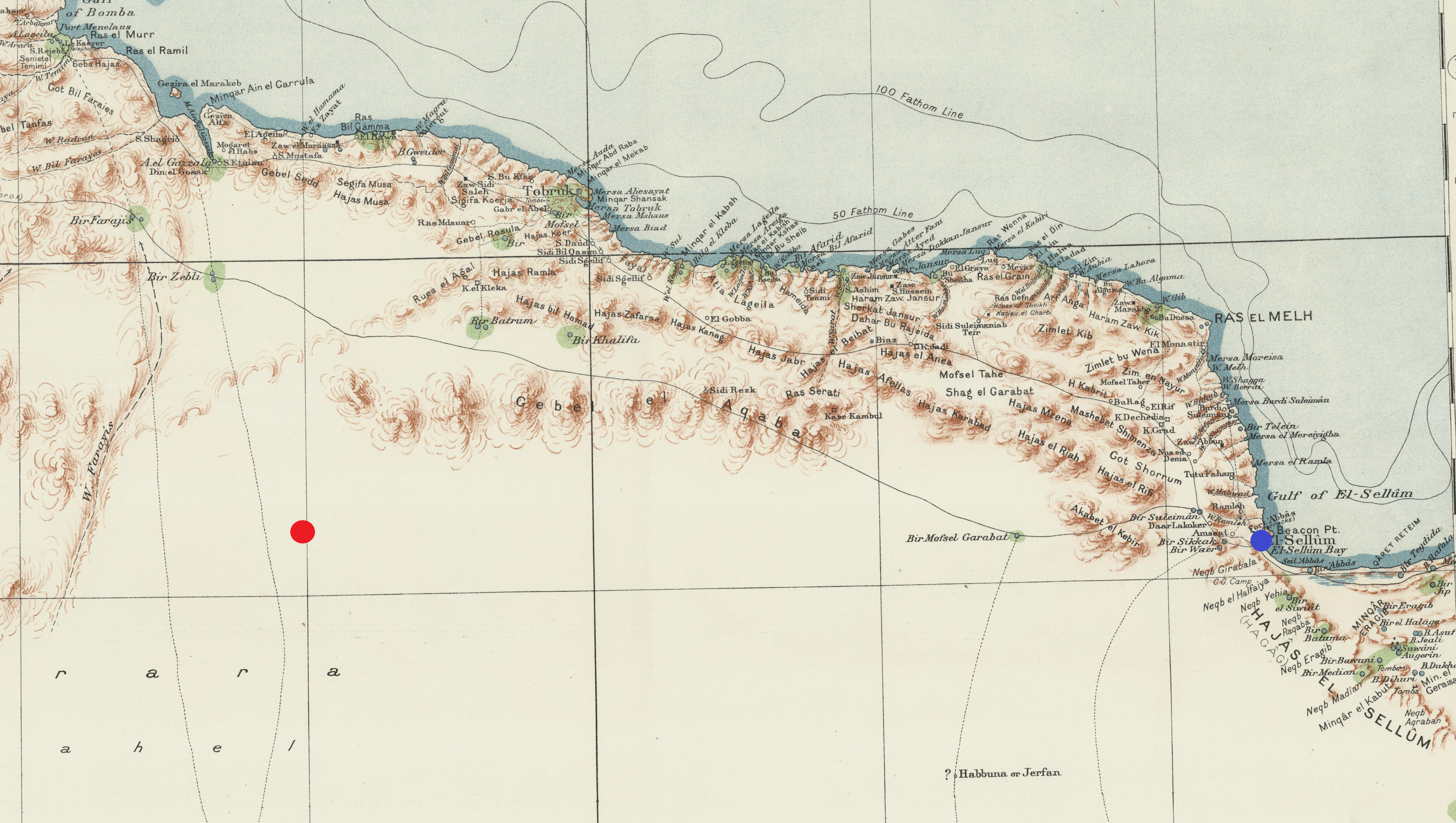
- Bir Hakeim (red) and Sollum (blue) on a 1916 British map
Date	17 March 1916
Location	Bir Hakeim, Italian Cyrenaica 31°35′38″N 23°28′48″E
Result	British victory

Belligerents
British Empire	Senussi

Commanders and leaders
(British Empire) Hugh Grosvenor	

Strength
45 vehicles	Senussi guards

Casualties and losses
None	
- Bir Hakeim, the site of an Ottoman fort built around a Roman well

The Bir Hakeim rescue (Arabic: بئر حكيم, romanized: biʾr ḥakīm, lit. 'Wise Well' pronounced [biʔr ħaˈkiːm]) was a British raid in Italian Cyrenaica (modern Libya) on 17 March 1916 to recover prisoners of war held by the Senussi. Following the capture of Sollum on 14 March the British discovered evidence that the prisoners, survivors from two ships sunk by a German U-boat, were being held at the Bir Hakeim oasis, about 99 mi (160 km) to the west.

A rescue force of armoured cars and ambulances was assembled by Major Hugh Grosvenor, 2nd Duke of Westminster. The force, starting before dawn, drove across the desert and surprised the Senussi guards. On finding the prisoners had been half-starved during their 135 days' captivity the British pursued the fleeing Senussi and massacred most of them, including women and children. The party then returned to Sollum.

== Background ==
The Allies and the Central Powers had been engaged in the First World War since 1914. As Caliph of the Islamic faith, the Ottoman Sultan, Mehmed V had some influence over the Senussi, Bedouin pastoralists of Italian Libya and the western portion of British Egypt. The Senussi were inspired to revolt against the colonial powers in November 1915 and occupied part of the coast and oases of the Sahara Desert, starting the Senussi campaign. The British formed the Western Frontier Force (WFF, Major-General William Peyton) to fight the Senussi. From February the British were reinforced by troops freed by the evacuation of Gallipoli.

The British defeated the main Senussi force on the coast at the Action of Agagia on 26 February but parts of the coast to the west and the oases in the interior remained under Senussi control. On 14 March the British re-occupied Sollum on the coast, to the west of Agagia, near the Libyan border. A mobile force, the Light Armoured Car Brigade (Major Hugh Grosvenor, 2nd Duke of Westminster), had played an important part, being directed in its movements by aircraft. Westminster's force consisted of three batteries of Rolls-Royce Armoured Cars, equipped with a machine gun in a turret.

== Prelude ==
When the British re-occupied Sollum, by a stroke of luck, a letter sent by Captain R. S. Gwatkin-Williams, the commander of Tara, to Sollum when he was ignorant that the British had withdrawn from the town, was found in a house. The contents of the letter indicated the whereabouts of the survivors of the crew of the armed boarding steamer TSS Hibernia and some from the horse transport HMT Moorina, ships sunk by SM U-35 in the Mediterranean on 5 and 7 November 1915. (Note: Some of the Moorinas boats reached Egyptian territory.) The WFF intelligence officer, Captain Leopold Royle, questioned the Senussi prisoners and established that the crews of the ships were at Bir Hakeim.

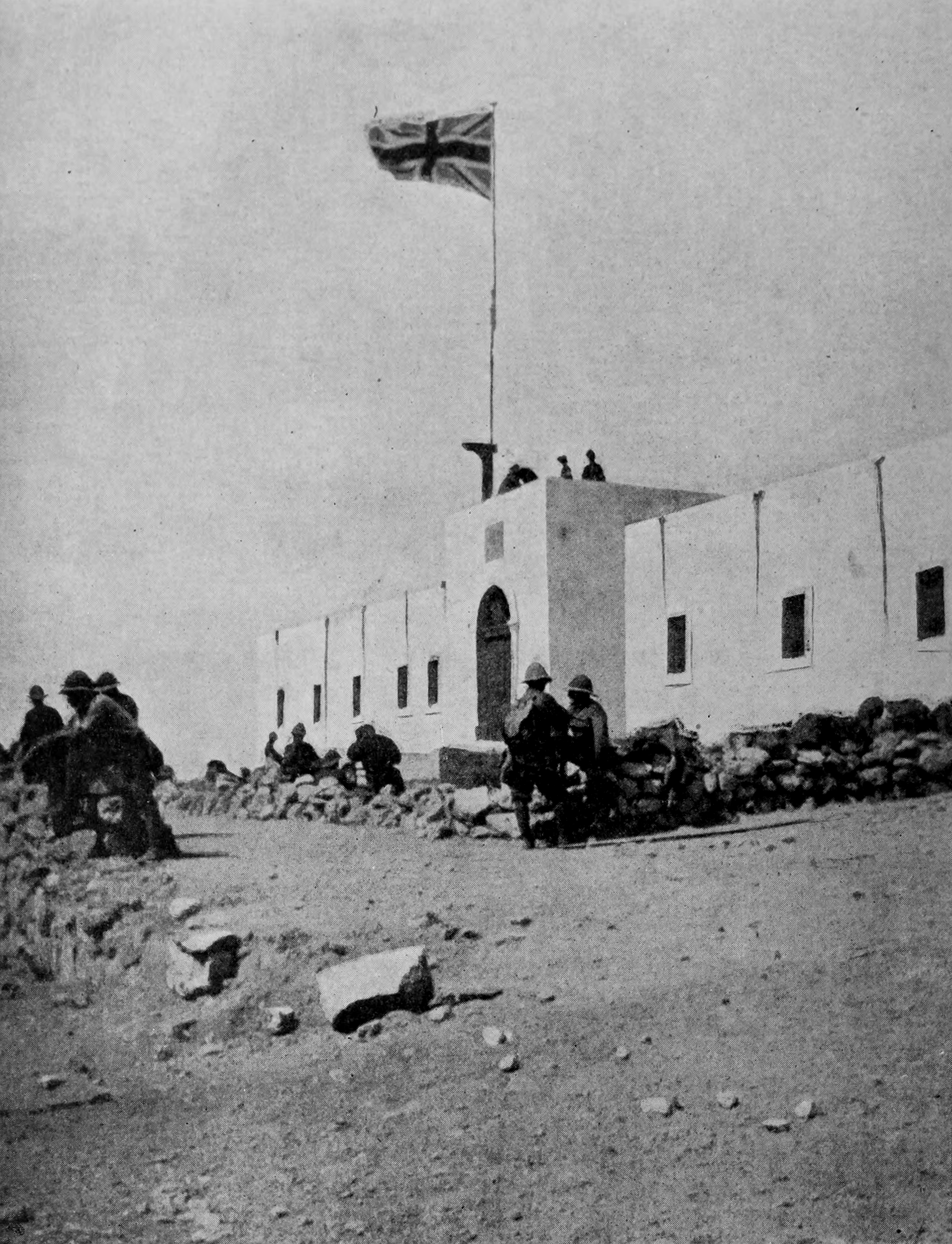
British troops in Sollum, 14 March 1916

Bir Hakeim was the name of the site of two Roman wells, a tomb and an Ottoman blockhouse about 120 mi (190 km) west of Sollum. The Bir (well) did not appear on British maps but two Arab guides with the British claimed to know its location. Westminster and Peyton decided on a rescue attempt. Royle had knowledge of the area from his pre-war service with the Egyptian Coastguard and knew that the first 50 mi (80 km) of the desert was traversable by motor car. Westminster gathered a force of 45 vehicles for the raid. The vehicles comprised nine armoured cars, plus his Rolls-Royce touring car and a number of un-armoured trucks and Ford ambulances.

== Rescue ==
Departing from Sollum at around 3.00 a.m. on 17 March, the group made the first part of the journey by moonlight. The party made fast progress despite the going varying from soft sand to ground strewn with boulders. With the assistance of the guides, the party reached Bir Hakeim around 12 hours later, having covered 120 mi (200 km). The attack was led by the armoured car of Lieutenant William Griggs. (Note: The Times identifies Griggs as a jockey, the brother of Walter Griggs.)

The Senussi guards were surprised and fled, pursued by two of the cars. The prisoners thought the war was over and the cars were bringing news of the armistice. When the cars opened fire on the nine fleeing guards and their families who were mixed among them, Gwatkin-Williams was surprised and attempted to intervene, shouting "Save them, they have been kind to us". Gwatkin-Williams's intervention failed, despite the efforts of the Duke of Westminster to halt the firing.

An armoured car driver, Sam Rolls, who wrote of the event in his 1937 memoir Steel Chariots in the Desert, stated that the British were shocked by the sight of the prisoners, whose 135 days of half-starvation in captivity had left them "living skeletons" and took vengeance on the Senussi. He describes the cars shooting down men, women and children with only two babies surviving. The intentional killing of non-combatants was a contravention of the First Geneva Convention (1864).

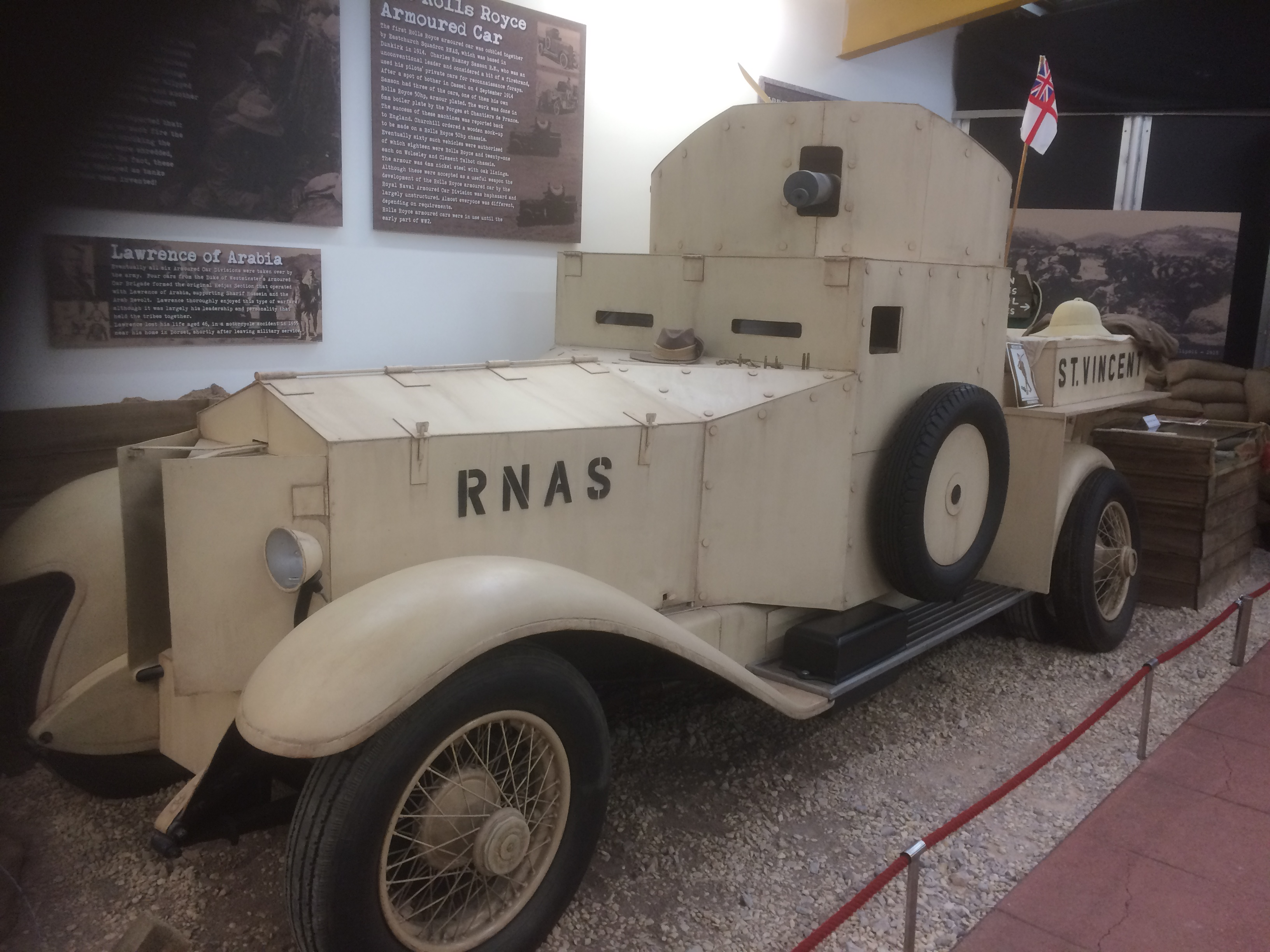
A replica of a Rolls-Royce armoured car in the desert

The British official history in 1928 wrote that the prisoners had suffered some ill-treatment but had not been treated badly given the local customs. A lack of food was unsurprising given the famine that was engulfing the Senussi. Four of the prisoners had died, mainly due to hunger and the survivors had suffered from illness, dysentery, lice and effects of the hot days and cold nights.

Within half an hour of their arrival the British loaded the 92 surviving prisoners into the trucks and ambulances and began their return to British-held territory. (Note: The official history gives "91 officers and other ratings" with note saying they including a British officer of the Indian cavalry and a Portuguese cook, the only civilian.) The party arrived at Sollum 22 hours after they had left, having covered 250 mi (400 km). The British force suffered no casualties and described the raid as having proceeded "without incident". The rescued prisoners were sent to Alexandria in Egypt, on the SS Rasheed for treatment before being returned to Britain. (Note: The Times gives the ship's name as Raschid.)

== Aftermath ==
The historian Charles Stephenson, writing in 2014, said the raid could not have been achieved by any means available at the time except for the armoured cars. Westminster was appointed to the Distinguished Service Order for his work in the raid. Fighting in the Senussi campaign continued at the oases in the interior of Egypt until February 1917 when a victory by a British force equipped with armoured cars at the Siwa Oasis ended Senussi resistance.

== Bibliography ==
- Burg, David F.; Purcell, L. Edward (12 September 2010). Almanac of World War I. University Press of Kentucky. ISBN 978-0-8131-2745-3.
- Hadaway, Stuart (1 October 2014). Pyramids and Fleshpots: The Egyptian, Senussi and Eastern Mediterranean Campaigns, 1914–16. The History Press. ISBN 978-0-7509-5808-0.
- Macksey, Kenneth (1983). A History of the Royal Armoured Corps and its Predecessors, 1914–1975. Newtown Publications. ISBN 978-0-9508536-0-4.
- Macmunn, George; Falls, Cyril (1996) [1928]. Written at London. Military Operations: Egypt and Palestine, From the Outbreak of War with Germany to June 1917. History of the Great War Based on Official Documents By Direction of the Historical Section of the Committee of Imperial Defence. Vol. I (facs. repr. Imperial War Museum Department of Printed Books and Battery Press ed.). Nashville, TN: HMSO. ISBN 978-0-89839-241-8.
- Reese, Peter (12 May 2022). Sir Henry Royce: Establishing Rolls-Royce, from Motor Cars to Aero Engines. The History Press. ISBN 978-1-80399-081-1.
- Smith, Angela K.; Cowman, Krista (3 February 2017). Landscapes and Voices of the Great War. Taylor & Francis. ISBN 978-1-351-85641-6.
- Stephenson, Charles (19 December 2014). A Box of Sand: The Italo-Ottoman War 1911–1912. Tattered Flag. ISBN 978-0-9576892-7-5.
- The Times History of the War. Vol. IX. London: The Times. 1916. OCLC 642276 – via Archive Foundation.
- Wieloch, Rupert (27 October 2021). Liberating Libya: British Diplomacy and War in the Desert. Casemate. p. 110. ISBN 978-1-63624-083-1.
- Williams, Claud (19 November 2013). Light Car Patrols 1916–19: War and Exploration in Egypt and Libya with the Model T Ford. Silphium Press. ISBN 978-1-900971-15-7.
