= Battle of Bir Hakeim =

Second World War battle in Libya

- Part of the Battle of Gazala
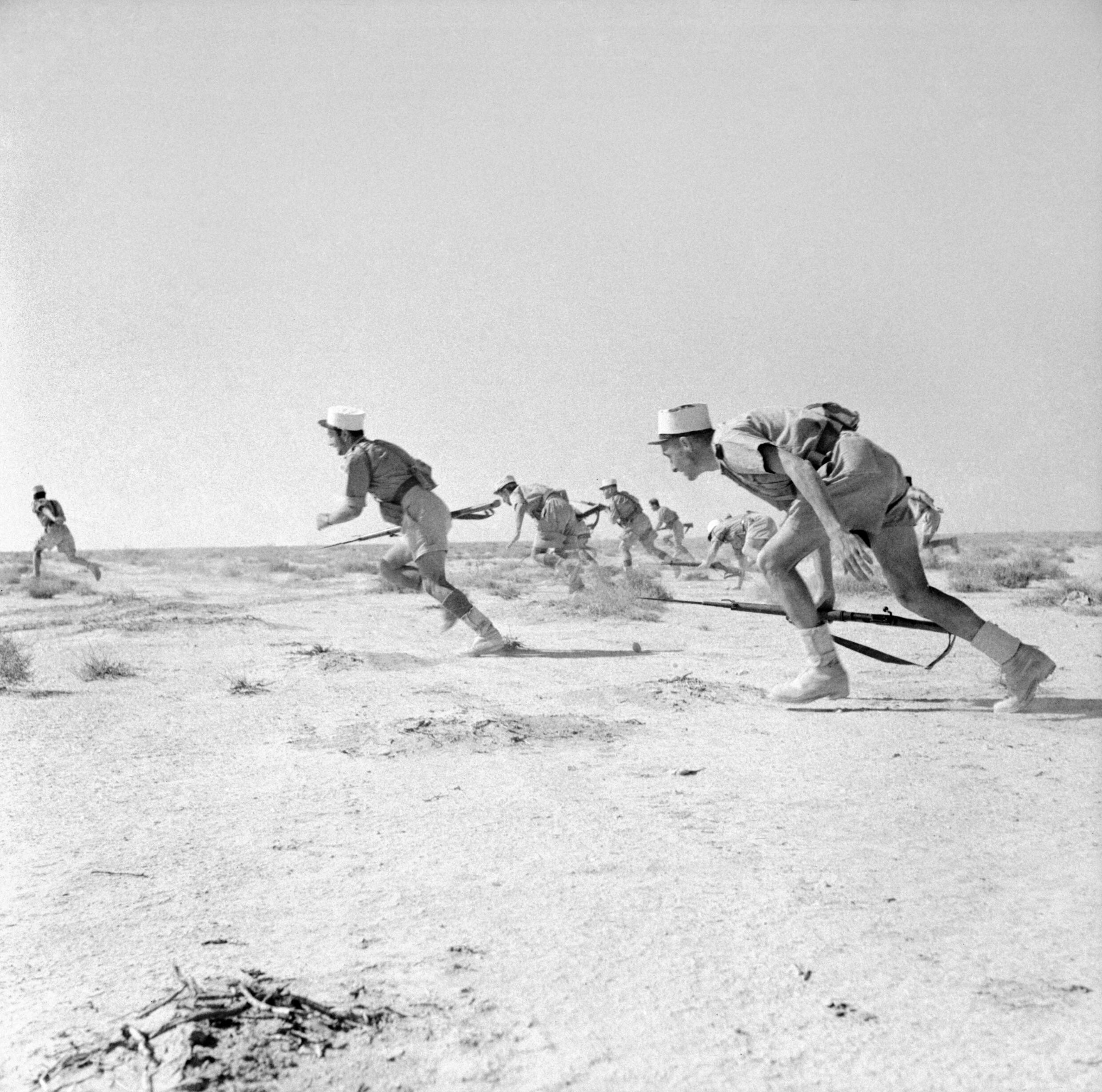
- Free French Legionnaires wearing distinctive kepi hats "leap up from the desert to rush an enemy strong point".
| Date | 26 May – 11 June 1942 (2 weeks and 2 days) |
| Location | Bir Hakeim, Italian Libya 31°35′37.93″N 23°28′47.16″E |
| Result | See Aftermath section |

Belligerents
| Free France; United Kingdom; British India | Germany; Italy |

Commanders and leaders
| Marie-Pierre Kœnig; Dimitri Amilakhvari | Erwin Rommel; Walter Nehring; Ettore Baldassarre |

Strength
| c. 3,723 men | 37,000–45,000 men |

Casualties and losses
| 141 killed; 229 wounded; 814 captured; 53 guns; 50 vehicles; 110 aircraft | 3,300 killed or wounded; 227–845 captured; 164 vehicles; 49 aircraft |
- Bir Hakeim was first attacked by the "Ariete" Division early in the Battle of Gazala, then by a mixed force of the "Trieste" and 90th Light Division.
- Location within Libya Battle of Bir Hakeim (Mediterranean)

The Battle of Bir Hakeim (Arabic pronunciation: [biʔr ħaˈkiːm]) took place at Bir Hakeim, an oasis in the Libyan desert southwest of Tobruk, during the Battle of Gazala (26 May – 21 June 1942). The 1st Free French Brigade (Général de brigade Marie-Pierre Kœnig) defended the position from 26 May to 11 June against Axis forces of the Panzerarmee Afrika (Generaloberst Erwin Rommel) that captured Tobruk ten days later.

The delay imposed on the Axis offensive by the defence of Bir Hakeim influenced the cancellation of Operation Herkules, the Axis invasion of Malta. Rommel invaded Egypt, slowed by British delaying actions until the First Battle of El Alamein in July, where the Axis advance was stopped. Both sides used the battle for propaganda, Winston Churchill declared the Free French to be the "Fighting French".

== Background ==
=== Eighth Army ===
At the beginning of 1942, after its defeat in western Cyrenaica during Unternehmen Theseus, the British Eighth Army under Lieutenant-General Neil Ritchie faced the Axis troops in Libya roughly 48 km (30 mi) west of the port of Tobruk, along a line running from the coast at Gazala, southwards for about 48 km (30 mi). Both sides accumulated supplies for an offensive to forestall their opponent and General Claude Auchinleck, Commander in Chief of Middle East Command, hoped for the Eighth Army to be ready by May. British code-breakers tracked the dispatch of convoys to Libya as the British offensive on Axis shipping to North Africa was neutralised by Axis bombing of Malta and forecast that the Axis would attack first.

As the Eighth Army was not ready to take the offensive, Ritchie planned to fight a defensive battle on the Gazala line. Auchinleck's appreciation of the situation to Ritchie in mid-May expected either a frontal attack in the centre of the Gazala line, followed by an advance on Tobruk or a flanking move to the south, looping around the Gazala line towards Tobruk. Auchinleck saw the former as more likely (with a feint on the flank to draw away the Eighth Army tanks) while Ritchie favoured the latter. Auchinleck suggested that British armour be concentrated near El Adem, where it would be well placed to meet either threat.

Since Operation Crusader in late 1941, the Eighth Army had received American M3 Grant medium tanks with a 37 mm gun in a turret and a 75 mm gun in a hull sponson, which could penetrate the armour of the opposing Panzer III Ausf. H and J and the Panzer IV tank models at 590–780 m (650–850 yd). The frontal armour of the Grant was thick enough to withstand the 50 mm Pak 38 anti-tank gun at 910 m (1,000 yd) and the short-barrelled 50 mm KwK 38 gun of the Panzer III at 230 m (250 yd). The first 112 of the new British 6-pounder (57 mm) anti-tank guns had arrived and been allotted to the motor brigades of the armoured divisions.

=== Panzerarmee Afrika/Armata Corazzata Africa ===
At the meeting of Axis leaders at Berchtesgaden on 1 May, it was agreed that Rommel should attack at the end of the month to capture Tobruk. The Panzer Army Africa (Panzerarmee Afrika/Armata Corazzata Africa) was to pause at the Egyptian border, while the Axis captured Malta in Operation Herkules and then Rommel was to invade Egypt. The Panzerarmee had finished converting to the up-armoured Panzer III Ausf. H and had received nineteen Panzer III Ausf. J, known to the British as Mark III Specials, with long-barrelled 5 cm KwK 39 guns. Four Panzer IV Ausf. G (Mark IV Specials) with long-barrelled 7.5 cm KwK 40 guns had also arrived. Abwehr (German military intelligence) had broken British codes and in late 1941 penetrated Black, the code used by Bonner Fellers, a US military attaché in Egypt. The British divulged much tactical information to Fellers, who unwittingly reported it to the Axis as well as the US government.

Air attacks by the Luftwaffe and Regia Aeronautica on Malta reduced its offensive capacity and supply convoys from Italy reached the Axis forces in Africa with fewer losses. Until May, Axis monthly deliveries to Libya averaged 61,000 t (60,000 long tons), less than a smaller Axis force received from June to October 1941 but sufficient for an offensive. The 1,400 km (900 mi) advance to Gazala succeeded because the port of Benghazi was open, reducing the transport distance for about 33 per cent of the supplies of the Panzerarmee to 450 km (280 mi). The capture of Malta would not alter the constraints of port capacity and distance; protecting convoys and the use of a large port close to the front would still be necessary.

Unternehmen Venezia (Operation Venice), the Axis plan, was for tanks to advance around the brigade forming the Bir Hakeim "box" at the southern extremity of the Gazala line. On the left side of the manoeuvre, the Italian 132nd Armoured Division "Ariete" would neutralise the Bir Hakeim box. Further south, the 21st Panzer Division and 15th Panzer Division would advance through the desert, move east, then turn north behind the Gazala line to destroy the British armour and cut off the infantry divisions in the line. The most southerly part of the attacking formation, a Kampfgruppe (battle group) of the 90th Light Afrika Division (90. leichte Afrika Division, Generalmajor Ulrich Kleemann), was to advance to El Adem south of Tobruk, cut the supply routes from the port to the Gazala line and hold British troops at Tobruk by a ruse; aircraft-engines mounted on trucks were to raise dust, simulating the presence of a big armoured force. The Germans had combed the French Foreign Legion in French North Africa and press-ganged some 2,000 German légionnaires into the 90th Light Afrika Division.

The rest of the Italian XX Motorised Corps, the 101st Motorized Division "Trieste", would gap the minefield north of Bir Hakeim, near the Sidi Muftah box, to create a supply route to the panzers. Rommel anticipated that having dealt with the British tanks, he would have captured El Adem, Ed Duda and Sidi Rezegh by nightfall and later the Knightsbridge defensive box, about 25 mi (40 km) north-east of Bir Hakeim. The Axis tanks would be in a position next day to thrust westwards against the Eighth Army defensive boxes between Gazala and Alem Hamza, meeting the eastwards attack by the Italian X Corps and XXI corps. By late May, the Axis forces comprised 90,000 men, 560 tanks and 542 aircraft.

== Prelude ==
=== Gazala line ===
Map of the Gazala line and Operation Venice, May–June, 1942.

Between Gazala and Timimi (just west of Tobruk), the Eighth Army was able to concentrate its forces sufficiently to turn and fight. By 4 February, the Axis advance had been halted and the front line had been stabilised, from Gazala on the coast 30 mi (48 km) west of Tobruk, to the old Ottoman fortress of Bir Hakeim, 50 mi (80 km) to the south. The Gazala line was a series of defensive boxes accommodating a brigade each, laid out across the desert behind minefields and wire, watched by regular patrols between the boxes. The Free French were in the south at the Bir Hakeim box, 13 mi (21 km) south of the 150th Infantry Brigade box, which was 6 mi (9.7 km) south of the 69th Infantry Brigade box. The line was not evenly manned, with a greater number of troops covering the coast road, leaving the south less protected but deep minefields had been laid in front of the boxes.

The longer line made an attack around the southern flank harder to supply. Behind the Gazala line were the Commonwealth Keep, Acroma, Knightsbridge and El Adem boxes, sited to block tracks and junctions. The box at Retma was finished just before the Axis offensive but work on the Point 171 and Bir el Gubi boxes did not begin until 25 May. By late May, the 1st South African Division was dug in nearest the coast, with the 50th (Northumbrian) Infantry Division to the south and 1st Free French Brigade furthest left at Bir Hakeim. The British 1st and 7th Armoured divisions waited behind the main line as a mobile counter-attack force, the 2nd South African Division garrisoned Tobruk and 5th Indian Infantry Division was in reserve. The British had 110,000 men, 843 tanks and 604 aircraft.

=== Bir Hakeim ===
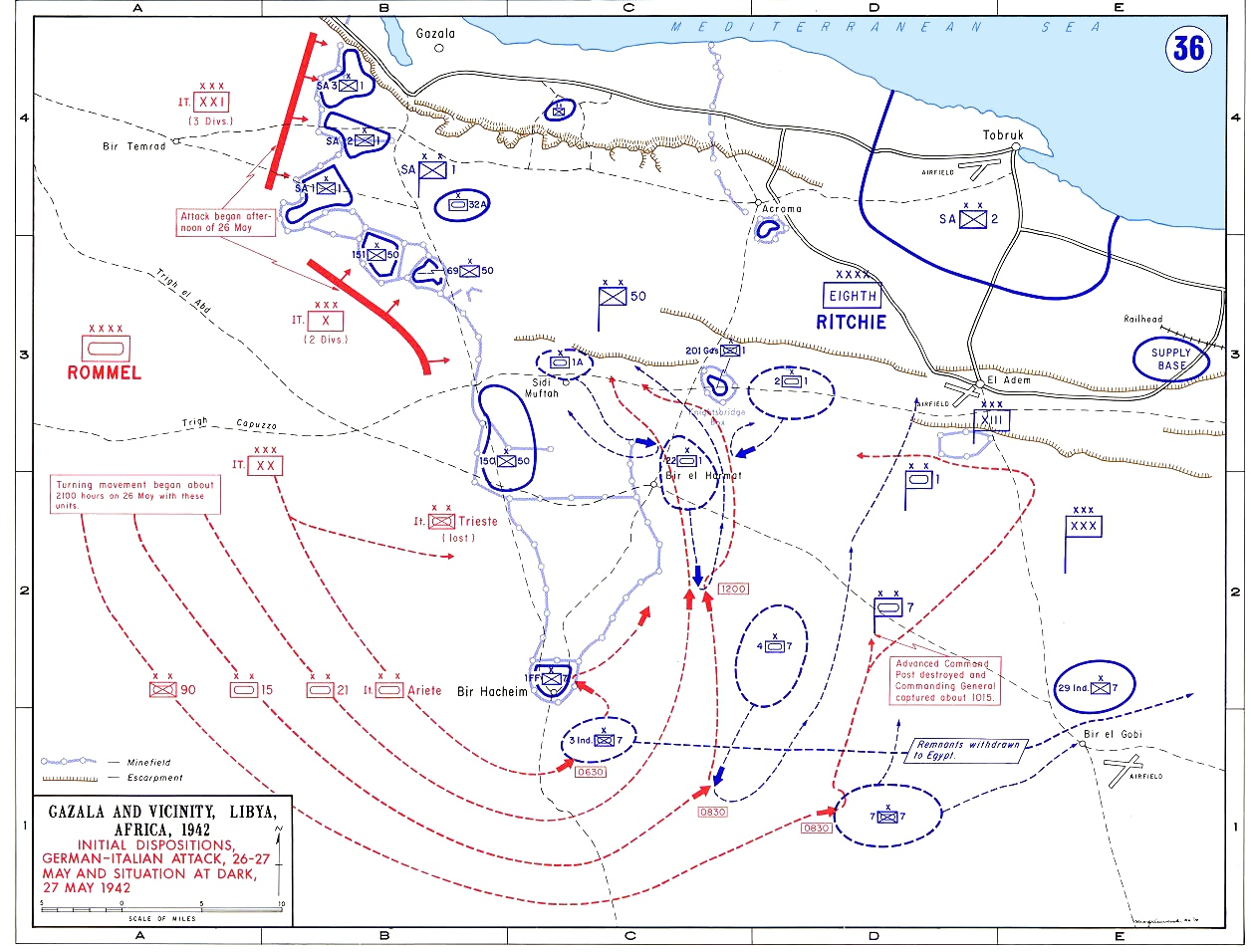
Axis advance, opening of Operation Venice

The fortress at Bir Hakeim (Old Man's Well) had been built by the Ottomans and later used as a station by the Italian Meharist (Camel Corps) to control movement at the crossroads of two Bedouin paths. The wells had long been dry and had been abandoned but Indian troops re-occupied the site to build a strongpoint surrounded by 50,000 mines. The fortification was a rough pentagon pointing north, about 2.5 mi × 3 mi (4 km × 5 km) wide. On 14 February, the 150th Infantry Brigade was relieved at the box by the 1st Free French Brigade (Général Marie Pierre Kœnig), part of XXX Corps (Lieutenant-General Willoughby Norrie). With a fighting strength of 3,000 men and a rear echelon of about 600 men based 15 mi (24 km) to the east behind the line, the brigade comprised the 13th Demi-Brigade of the Foreign Legion (13e DBLE), an established unit and the backbone of the Free French, with the 2nd Colonial Demi-Brigade.

The 13e DBLE had been formed to fight in Finland but was used in the Norwegian campaign and was the first unit to join the Free French in England. It was a veteran of the fighting in Italian Eritrea and French Syria against Vichy; the half-brigade was reinforced by c. 1,000 légionnaires and two officers of the defeated 6th Foreign Infantry Regiment (6e REI), which now formed a third battalion. By mid-May the perimeter and central areas were honeycombed with 1,200 entrenchments, foxholes, gun emplacements and underground bunkers, deep camouflaged hides for vehicles and supply dumps. The interior of the fort was divided into zones, each the responsibility of a unit, with Kœnig's headquarters near the centre, at the crossroads. The V-shaped anti-tank and anti-personnel minefields were patrolled by the 3rd Foreign Legion Battalion (Lamaze), in 63 Bren Gun Carriers divided into three squadrons. The patrols moved along lanes in the minefields, paying particular attention to the area north to the Sidi Muftah box at Got el Ualeb, held by the 150th Brigade.

=== Battle of Gazala ===
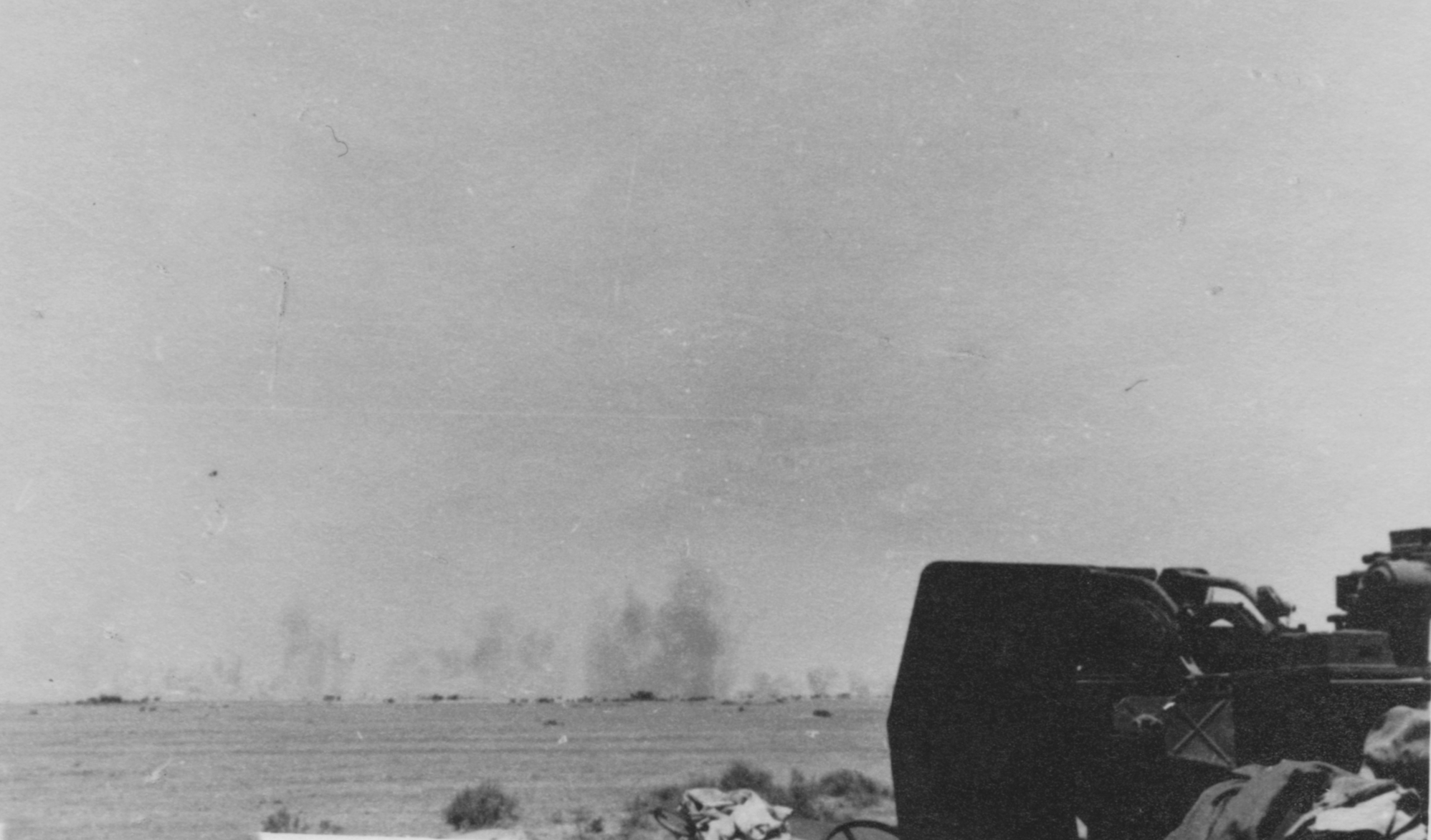
A German 20 mm anti-aircraft gun in the foreground and a Luftwaffe air raid on Bir Hakeim in the background

At 2:00 p.m. on 26 May, the Italian X and XXI Corps began a frontal attack on the central Gazala line. A few elements of the Afrika Korps and the Italian XX Motorised Corps participated and during the day the bulk of the Afrika Korps moved north, to give the impression that it was the main attack. After dark, the armoured formations turned south in a sweeping move around the southern end of the Gazala line. Early on 27 May, the main force of Panzerarmee Afrika, the Afrika Korps, XX Motorised Corps and the 90th Light Division, went round the southern end of the Gazala line, using the British minefields to protect the Axis flank and rear. The Ariete Division was held up for about an hour by the 3rd Indian Motor Brigade (7th Armoured Division), dug in about 3.7 mi (6 km) south-east of Bir Hakeim.

The 15th Panzer Division engaged the 4th Armoured Brigade, which had come south to support the 3rd Indian and 7th Motorised brigades. The Germans were surprised by the range and power of the 75 mm guns on the new M3 Grants but by late morning the 4th Armoured Brigade had withdrawn toward El Adem and Axis armoured units had advanced more than 25 mi (40 km) north. Their advance was stopped around noon by the 1st Armoured Division, in mutually-costly fighting. On the right, the 90th Light Division forced the 7th Motorised Brigade out of Retma eastwards on Bir el Gubi. Advancing toward El Adem at mid-morning, armoured cars of the 90th Light Division overran and scattered the advanced HQ of the 7th Armoured Division (Major-General Frank Messervy), near Bir Beuid. Messervy was captured and removed his insignia, persuading the Germans that he was a batman; he escaped with several other men to rejoin the division. The 90th Light Division reached the El Adem area by mid-morning and captured several supply bases. The following day, the 4th Armoured Brigade moved on El Adem and forced the 90th Light Division to retire to the south-west.

== Siege ==
=== 27 May ===
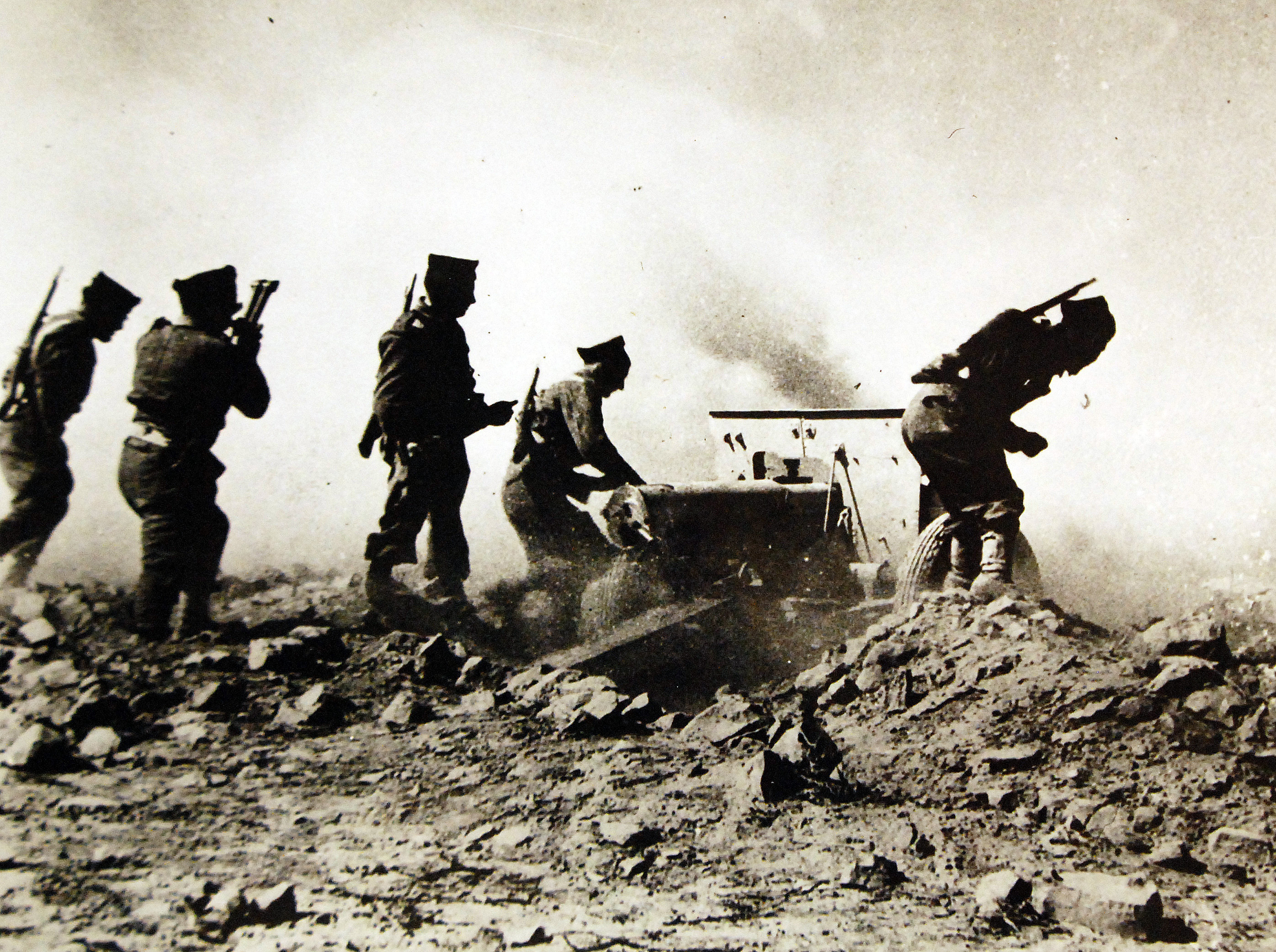
French 75 mm anti-tank gun in action

XX Corps was to attack the Bir Hakeim box to prevent the French Brigade interfering to the main attack together with the Afrika Korps (Generalleutnant Walter Nehring). The 15th and 21st Panzer divisions, the rest of the 90th Light Division and the "Ariete" Division began their large encircling move south of Bir Hakeim as planned. The German tanks in the area were ordered south by Rommel. The 3rd Indian Motor Brigade was surprised at 6:30 a.m. on 27 May and overrun at Point 171, 4 mi (6.5 km) south-east of Bir Hakeim, by the 132nd Tank Infantry Regiment of the "Ariete" Division, losing about 440 men and most of its equipment. The 7th Motor Brigade was then attacked at Retma and forced back to Bir el Gubi. The 4th Armoured Brigade advanced in support and ran into the 15th Panzer Division; the 8th Hussars were destroyed and the 3rd Royal Tank Regiment (3rd RTR) lost many tanks. The British inflicted considerable losses in return and retired to El Adem.

After over-running the 3rd Indian Motor Brigade, the VIII Tank Battalion M13/40, IX Tank Battalion M13/40 and X Tank Battalion M13/40 of the 132nd Tank Infantry Regiment moved to the north-east of Bir Hakeim and the IX Battalion (Colonel Prestisimone) with 60 tanks, changed direction towards the fort. The IX Battalion arrived before the Bir Hakeim minefield and barbed wire at 8:15 a.m., charged and lost 31 tanks and a Semovente self-propelled gun. Ten tanks got through the minefield and were knocked out by 75 mm anti-tank guns, causing 124 Italian casualties. The remnants of the IX Battalion retired to the main body of the "Ariete" Division, which moved north towards Bir el Harmat around noon, following Rommel's original plan.

=== 28–30 May ===
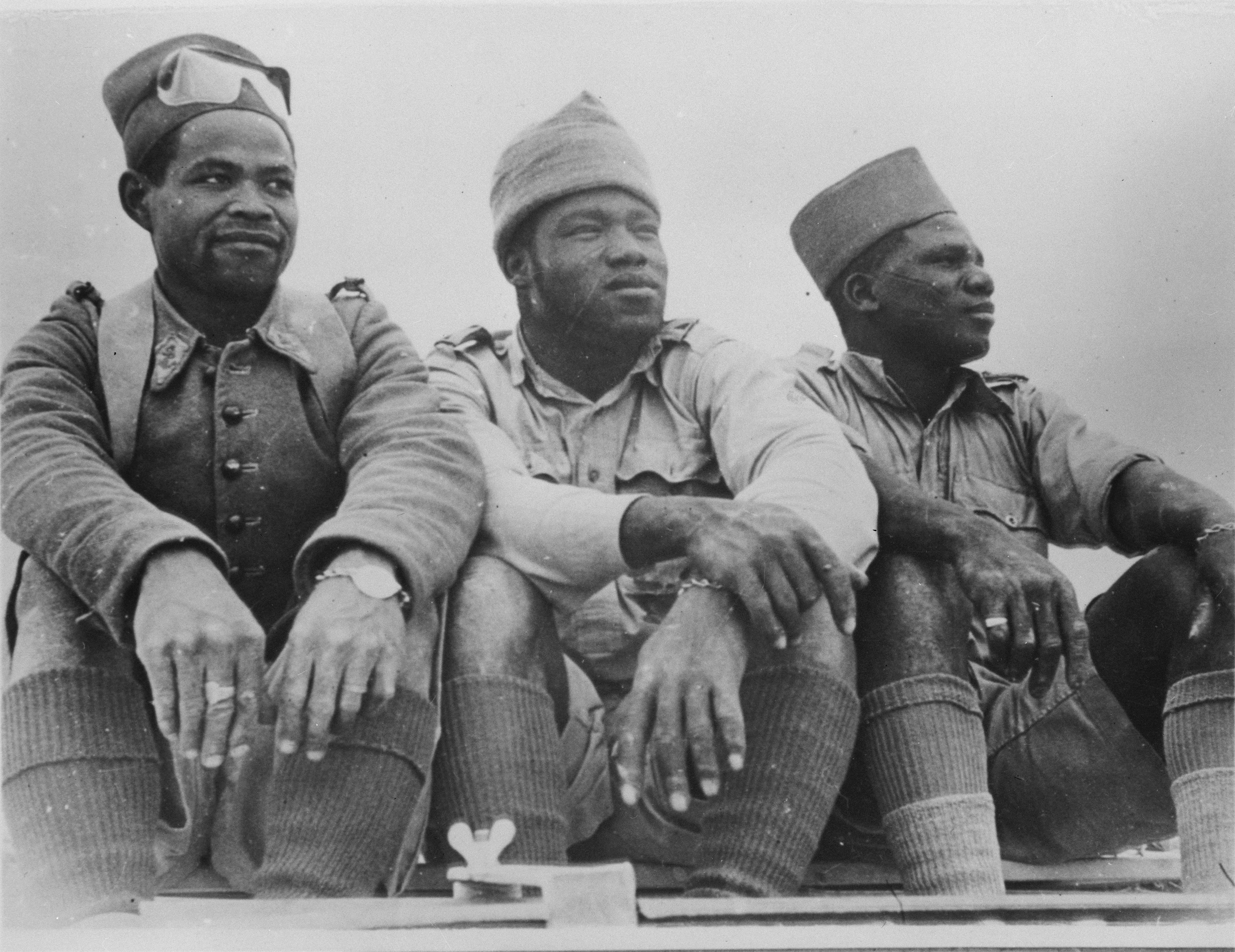
Three soldiers of the French Colonial Artillery who distinguished themselves in the battle at Bir Hakeim, from Senegal, Equatorial Africa and Madagascar, respectively.

On 28 May, the Desert Air Force (DAF) made a maximum effort to attack Axis columns around El Adem and Bir Hakeim but in the poor visibility, bombed Bir Hakeim and its surroundings, misled by the Italian tank wrecks around the position and Kœnig sent a detachment to destroy the wrecks to avoid any more mistakes. A French column was sent to make contact with the 150th Infantry Brigade, stationed further to the north. After a few hours, Italian artillery forced them to retire but the French column destroyed seven half-tracks. On 29 May, the detachment of Capitaine Gabriel de Sairigné destroyed three German tanks, British air attacks intercepted two raids by Junkers Ju 87 (Stuka) dive-bombers and fighter-bombers attacked Axis supply lines south and east of Bir Hakeim. On 30 May, 620 soldiers from the 3rd Indian Motor Brigade, captured by the Axis and then released in the desert, reached the fort and added to the 243 prisoners already there, making the water shortage worse. The detachment of Capitaine Lamaze, at the request of the 7th Armoured Division, sealed off the breach opened the day before by the Axis tanks in the minefields. Led by Colonel Dimitri Amilakhvari, the legionnaires were ambushed but managed to retreat with the help of the Bren carriers of the 9th Company (Pierre Messmer).

=== 31 May–1 June ===
On 31 May, during a two-day sandstorm, fifty supply trucks of the 101st Transport Company (Captaine Dulau), reached Bir Hakeim with water and took the Indians, prisoners and seriously wounded back to the British lines. A raid by the detachments Messmer, de Roux and de Sairigné, led by Amilakhvari, destroyed five tanks and an armoured vehicle repair workshop. The Panzerarmee had been forced to retreat westwards, to an area north of Bir Hakeim, which became known as the Cauldron, having attacked the 150th Infantry Brigade box since 28 May. During the day, the DAF lost fifteen fighters and a bomber, fifteen in combat with Axis fighters and one to flak, the worst daily loss of the battle; the Luftwaffe lost nine aircraft. On the west side of the Cauldron, the 150th Infantry Brigade was overrun late on 1 June, despite British relief attempts. The Axis troops that had been trapped gained a supply route through the Eighth Army minefields north of Bir Hakeim and next morning the encirclement of the fort was resumed by the 90th Light Division, Trieste Division and three armoured reconnaissance companies from the 17th Infantry Division "Pavia". At 8:00 a.m. German troops approached from the south and Italian forces advanced from the north. Two Italian officers presented themselves at 10:30 a.m. to the 2nd Foreign Legion Battalion lines, asking for the capitulation of the fort, which Kœnig refused.

=== 2–4 June ===
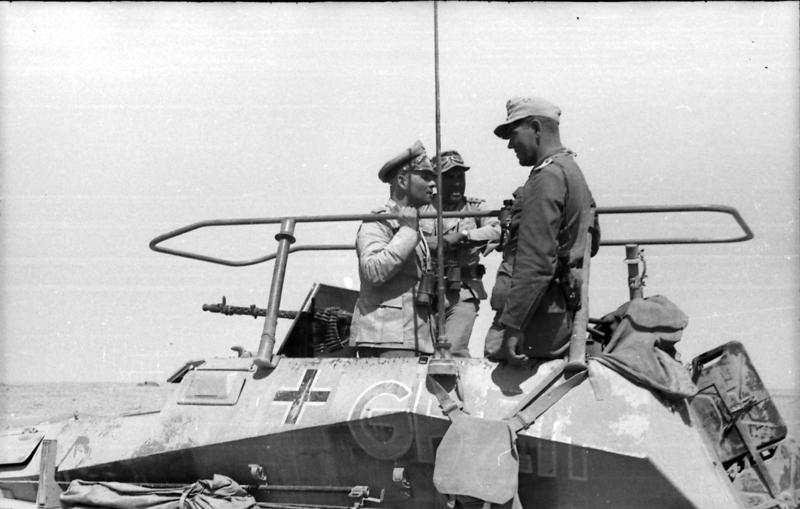
Erwin Rommel and Fritz Bayerlein near Bir Hakeim.

From 10:00 a.m. on 2 June, both sides exchanged artillery fire but the French field guns were out-ranged by German medium artillery and the fort was bombed by German and Italian aircraft. Stuka dive bombers raided Bir Hakeim more than twenty times but the French positions were so well built as to be almost invulnerable. The British were unable to reinforce the French, who repulsed the "Ariete" Division attack but on 2 June, the DAF had an easily observed bomb line around the fort and concentrated on the area with fighter patrols and fighter-bomber attacks. The sight of scores of burning vehicles helped to maintain the morale of the defenders, who harassed Axis communications around the fort, as did the 7th Motor Brigade and the 29th Indian Infantry Brigade which were in the vicinity. On 4 June, DAF fighters and fighter-bombers disrupted Stuka attacks and bombed Axis vehicles, blowing up an ammunition wagon in view of the French but losing seven aircraft. Kœnig signalled Air Vice-Marshal Arthur Coningham. "Bravo! Merci pour la R.A.F" which brought the reply "Merci pour le sport".

=== 5–7 June ===
From 5 to 6 June, the DAF flew fewer sorties at Bir Hakeim, concentrating on the Knightsbridge Box and around 11:00 a.m. on 6 June, the 90th Light Division attacked with the support of pioneers to try to clear a passage through the minefield. The pioneers got within 3,000 ft (800 m) of the fort, having breached the outer minefield and during the night they managed to clear several passages into the inner perimeter. German infantry gained a foothold but the French troops in foxholes, dug outs and blockhouses, maintained a great volume of small-arms fire, which forced the Germans under cover. Operation Aberdeen, an attempt to destroy Axis forces in the Cauldron, which had begun on the night of 4/5 June, was a débâcle. Ritchie considered withdrawing the French from the fort to release the 7th Motor Brigade but decided to keep possession and on 7 June, four DAF raids were made against the Germans in the minefields. That night, a last convoy approached the fort and Aspirant Bellec got through the German lines, in thick fog, to guide the convoy in. The Germans used the fog to prepare a final assault; tanks, 88 mm guns and the pioneers of Gruppe Hecker formed up in front of the fort.

=== 8–9 June ===
On the morning of 8 June, after the defeat of Operation Aberdeen, Rommel had released part of the 15th Panzer Division and Gruppe Hecker for the siege. Rommel commanded an attack from the north, approaching as close as possible in thick fog, with artillery firing directly against the fortifications. The Luftwaffe made constant attacks, including a raid by 45 Stukas, three Junkers Ju 88 bombers and ten Messerschmitt Bf 110 twin-engined fighters escorted by 54 fighters. Just before 10:00 a.m. the attack began, aiming at a low rise which would overlook the French defences. The Chadian and Congolese defenders held on despite many casualties and in the afternoon another 60 Stukas bombed the perimeter and an attack was made all round the northern defences. An ammunition dump was blown up and the perimeter forced back. Kœnig reported that the garrison was exhausted, had suffered many casualties and was down to its reserve supplies; he asked for more air support and a relief operation. The DAF made another maximum effort, flew a record 478 sorties and during the night, Hawker Hurricane fighters and Douglas Boston bombers dropped supplies to the garrison. The DAF lost eight fighters (three to Italian Macchi C.202s) and two bombers; the Luftwaffe lost two aircraft and the Regia Aeronautica one.

On the morning of 9 June, 20 Ju 88s and 40 Ju 87 Stukas escorted by 50 Bf 110 and Bf 109 fighters, attacked Bir Hakeim. The Germans waited for the rest of the 15th Panzer Division to arrive as German artillery and aircraft bombarded the fort, then a two-pronged attack struck the perimeter. Italian infantry fought alongside Kampfgruppe Wolz, the German and Libyan infantry of Sonderverband 288 (Special Commando 288) from the 90th Light Division, elements of the reconnaissance and infantry units of 15th and 21st Panzer Divisions and Kampfgruppe Kiehl a company of 11 tanks. The objective was Point 186, the top of a gentle rise in the ground which acted as a fire-control position for the garrison. A few skirmishes occurred between the 66th Infantry Regiment "Trieste" of the "Trieste" Division and the men commanded by Lieutenant Bourgoin, whose unit was down only to hand grenades. The Bataillon de Marche made a determined defence but was forced back, despite reinforcements of the 22nd North African Company.

In the afternoon, to the south, near the old fort, Oberstleutnant Ernst-Günther Baade led two battalions of Rifle Regiment 115 into the assault and in a costly advance, it established a position 200 yd (200 m) of the fort by nightfall. At 1:00 p.m., as 130 aircraft bombed the north face of the fort, the German infantry and the 15th Panzer Division attacked behind an artillery barrage. The attackers breached the 9th Company lines and the central position of Aspirant Morvan but the situation was restored with a Bren carrier counter-attack. Many DAF aircraft were unserviceable and the effort for the day was much reduced but two Hurricanes dropped medical supplies; diversions attempted by columns from the 7th Motor Brigade and the 29th Indian Infantry Brigade were too small to have much effect. In the afternoon Messervy, the commander of the 7th Armoured Division, signalled that a break-out might be necessary and Kœnig asked for DAF protection for an evacuation at 11:00 p.m. that night. The request was made at too short notice and the garrison had to wait until the night of 10/11 June for a rendezvous to be arranged by the British to the south.

=== Retreat, 10–11 June ===
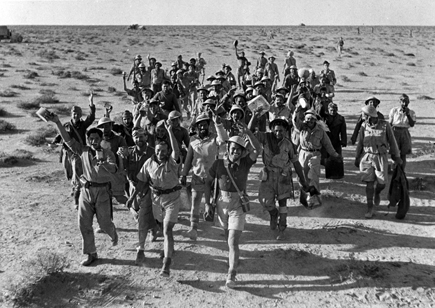
Free French Forces evacuate Bir Hakeim.

During 10 June, the French hung on and suffered many casualties; with only two hundred 75 mm rounds and 700 mortar rounds left, another attack on the northern sector against the Oubangui-Chari and 3rd Foreign Legion Battalion lines was contained by a counter-attack by the Messmer and Lamaze units, supported by Bren carriers and the last mortar rounds. In the afternoon, the biggest air attack of the siege, a raid by 100 Stukas dropped 130 long tons (130 t) of bombs. The last rounds of ammunition were issued and bodies searched for more; Rommel predicted that Bir Hakeim would fall the next day but resisted pressure to attack with tanks, fearing that many would be lost in the minefields.

As darkness fell, sappers began to clear mines from the western face of the fortress, heavy equipment was prepared for demolition and two companies were detailed to stay behind to disguise the retirement. A rendezvous was arranged with the 7th Motor Brigade, which ran a convoy of lorries and ambulances to a point 4.3 mi (7 km) south of the fort. Mine clearance by the sappers took longer than expected and they were only able to clear a narrow passage, rather than a 660 ft (200 m) corridor. Vehicles went astray and the ambulances and walking-wounded left the perimeter 75 minutes late at 8:30 p.m. Kœnig put the fort under the command of Amilakhvari, the Foreign Legion commander and left the fort at the head of the column in his Ford, driven by Susan Travers, an Englishwoman, the only female member of French Foreign Legion (and one of several women, mostly British, present at the siege).

A flare rose and the Axis troops nearby opened fire. The guide of the HQ column got lost and during the retirement was blown up three times by mines. When Kœnig caught up with the main column, it was blocked by troops of the 90th Light Division and he ordered a rush, regardless of the mines; Lamaze, Commandant Charles Bricogne and Lieutenant Dewey were killed in the mêlée. The reception was organised by 550 Company Royal Army Service Corps (RASC) which drove lorries and guided extra field ambulances, with inexperienced rear-area crews, escorted by the 2nd King's Royal Rifle Corps (KRRC) and the 2nd Rifle Brigade on either side. The ambulances became separated in the dark but were found and guided to the rendezvous. The commander of the 3rd Battalion was captured but most of the brigade managed to break out, reach Bir el Gubi, then withdraw to Gasr-el-Arid by 7:00 a.m. on 11 June. About 2,700 men of the original 3,600 men escaped, including 200 wounded; during the day British patrols picked up stragglers.

== Aftermath ==
=== Analysis ===
The Free French occupation of Bir Hakeim had lengthened the Axis supply route around the south end of the Gazala line, caused them losses and gave the British more time to recover in the wake of their defeat at the Cauldron. From 2 to 10 June the DAF had flown about 1,500 sorties and lost 19 fighters over the fort, against about 1,400 Axis sorties in which 15 German and five Italian aircraft were shot down; the 7th Motor Brigade ran four supply convoys into Bir Hakeim from 31 May to 7 June. Free French morale was raised by its performance in the battle; a victory had been badly needed to show the Allies that they were a serious force, which could contribute to the war against Germany. The term Free French was replaced by Fighting French, because the battle had shown the world that a revival after the defeat in 1940 was under way; De Gaulle used it to undermine co-operation with the Vichy regime. In 1960, the British official historian Ian Playfair wrote,

At the outset it had made longer and more difficult the enemy's temporary supply route; it had caused him many casualties and it gave the British a chance to recover from their defeat in the Cauldron. General Kœnig's brigade made a great impression upon the enemy by their courageous and enterprising resistance and their success gave a well-won fillip to the pride of the Free French, who, for the first time in the Middle East, had fought the Germans and Italians in a complete formation on their own.

Auchinleck said on 12 June 1942, "The United Nations need to be filled with admiration and gratitude in respect of these French troops and their brave General Kœnig". After the war, Generalmajor Friedrich von Mellenthin wrote, "Some British officers have insinuated that French morale gave way but in the whole course of the desert war, we never encountered a more heroic and well-sustained defence".

=== Casualties ===
Thomas Buell in 2002 and Ken Ford in 2008 wrote of 141 French dead, 229 wounded and 814 men taken prisoner, with the loss of 53 guns and 50 vehicles. The British lost 86 aircraft shot down by aircraft and 24 by flak. The Axis forces suffered casualties of 3,300 dead or wounded, 227 captured, 164 vehicles destroyed and 49 aircraft shot down. The Regia Aeronautica lost 21 aeroplanes, eight in air fighting. In 2004, Douglas Porch recorded that the Axis took 845 prisoners at Bir Hakeim, only ten per cent of whom were French; Hitler had ordered that captured German political refugees were to be killed, an order that Rommel ignored.

== Order of battle ==
1st Free French Brigade

Infantry

- 13e Demi-Brigade de Légion étrangère (Colonel Dimitri Amilakvari)
  - 2nd Bataillon (II/13e DBLE)
  - 3rd Bataillon (III/13e DBLE) (63 × Bren Gun Carriers)
- 2nd Colonial Demi-Brigade (Lieutenant-Colonel Roux)
  - 2nd Bataillon de marche de l'Oubangui
  - 1st Bataillon du Pacifique (Lieutenant-Colonel Broche)
  - 1st Bataillon d'infanterie de Marine (Coloniale) (Major Jacques Savey)
  - 22nd North African Company (Captain Lequesne)
  - 2nd Anti-tank Company (Captain Jacquin)
  - Signal, engineer and medical companies

Artillery

- 1st Artillery Regiment (Colonel Laurent-Champrosay)
  - 24 × 75 mm guns (30 × used as anti-tank guns)
  - 7 × 47 mm APX anti-tank gun
  - 18 × 25 mm Hotchkiss anti-tank gun
  - 46 × Boys anti-tank rifles (British-supplied)
  - 18 × Bofors 40 mm gun anti-aircraft guns
  - 44 × 81 mm (3.19 in) and 90 mm (3.54 in) mortars
  - 72 × Hotchkiss machine guns
  - 8 × heavy anti-aircraft machine-guns

Anti-aircraft

- 1 Bataillon de Fusiliers Marins (Commander Hubert Amyot d'Inville)
  - 12 × Bofors guns
- D Troop, 43rd Battery, 11th City of London Yeomanry (Rough Riders) Light Anti-Aircraft Regiment RA, 84 gunners
  - 6 × Bofors guns
  - 2 × 25-pounder guns

Ammunition

- 20,000 × 75 mm shells.

== See also ==
- North African campaign timeline
- List of World War II battles
- Pont de Bir-Hakeim and Bir-Hakeim station in Paris, named after the battle
