= Bir Hakeim =

Site of an Ancient Roman well and Ottoman fort in the Libyan Desert

- Arabic: بئر حكيم, romanized: biʾr ḥakīm
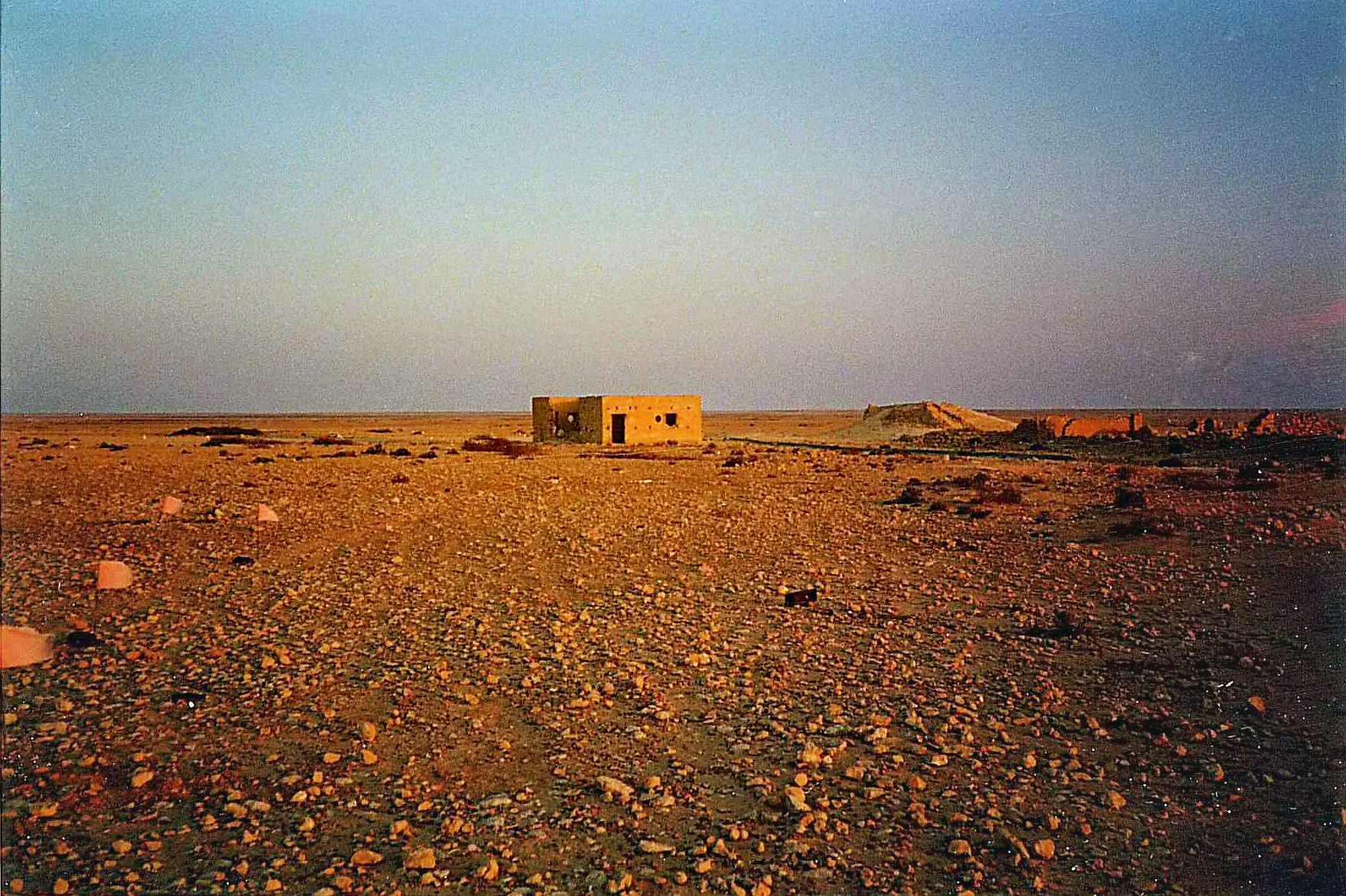
- Bir Hakeim in 1990

- Location within Libya
- 31°35′38″N 23°28′48″E
- Location: Libya

Bir Hakeim (Arabic: بئر حكيم, romanized: biʾr ḥakīm, lit. 'wise well', pronounced [biʔr ħaˈkiːm], sometimes written Bir Hacheim) is the site of a former Ottoman fort in the Libyan desert. It is about 160 km (99 mi) west of Sollum on the Libyan coast and 80 km (50 mi) south-east of Gazala. Bir Hakeim is best known for the battle of Bir Hakeim, which took place there during World War II.

== History ==
As a result of the Italo-Turkish War (1911-1912), Italy captured the Ottoman Tripolitania Vilayet (province), which became known as Italian Libya. The Italian army stationed a unit of its Zaptié Meharista at Bir Hakeim.

The Ottomans constructed a fort at Bir Hakeim which was built around the site of an ancient Roman well.

=== Bir Hakeim rescue (1916) ===
Bir Hakeim had been the site of a daring rescue during World War I. On 14 March 1916 Major Hugh Grosvenor led an armoured car squadron, part of the Western Frontier Force, to Bir Hakeim after having travelled 120 miles across the desert from Sollum. There they rescued 91 British POWs from HMS Tara and HMT Moorina. German U-boats had captured the British sailors after torpedoing their vessels and had turned their prisoners over to the local Senussi, who were allied with the Germans.

=== Battle of Bir Hakeim (1942) ===
The battle occurred during the Battle of Gazala (26 May – 21 June 1942) when the 1st Free French Brigade of Général de brigade, future Maréchal de France Marie-Pierre Kœnig defended the site from 26 May – 11 June against much larger German and Italian forces, commanded by Generaloberst Erwin Rommel.

Capitaine Pierre Messmer was one of the French officers of the 13th half-brigade of the French Foreign Legion. Messmer had graduated from St Cyr Military School. He was commanding the 3rd battalion of the Legion. Many of his soldiers were from Spanish and German origin, and many of them Jews. The Kaddish was said most evenings at Bir-Hakeim. The other half-brigade of the 1st Free French Division included units that did not belong to the French Foreign Legion, such as the Bataillon de Marche n°2 de l'Afrique équatoriale française (BM2), the Bataillon du Pacifique (French Polynesia, New Caledonia and New Hebrides), the 1st Bataillon of Infanterie de Marine, the 1st Regiment of Artillerie, the 1st Bataillon of Fusiliers Marins in association with troop D of the 43rd Battery of the 11th City of London Yeomanry Regiment and the 22nd North-African French Armored Company.

Pierre Messmer was the first French Foreign Legion soldier to be elected to the Académie Française. He would later become Prime Minister of the French Republic under President Georges Pompidou.

During these 14 days, 3700 French soldiers immobilized 40 000 Axis soldiers. Out of these 3700, 800 died or went missing. This half-brigade had already fought the German Army at Narvik on 27 May 1940.

Although the Afrika Corps captured Tobruk ten days later, the delay imposed on the Axis offensive by the defence of Bir Hakeim influenced the cancellation of Operation Herkules, the planned German invasion of the Suez Canal and Malta. The stand by the Free French gave the defeated and retreating British Eighth Army enough time to recover from its heavy losses and to reorganize. The British then stopped the German advance at the First Battle of El Alamein. The Algerian and Moroccan units of the 1st Free French Division gave birth to the French Expeditionary Corps under the command of Général Alphonse Juin, future Maréchal de France, and Général Joseph de Goislard de Monsabert. They also took part in the Battle of Monte Cassino. There the 3rd Division d'Infanterie Algérienne (3rd DIA) and the Groupement des Tabors Marocains of Général Augustin Guillaume were recognized in breaking through the German defences of the Gustav Line.

This battle would serve as the namesake for Bir-Hakeim (Paris Métro), a station on the Paris Métro, and Pont de Bir-Hakeim, a bridge.

== See also ==
- Battle of Bir Hakeim
- Battle of Gazala
- Western Desert Campaign
