= Strand Barracks =

Military barracks in Limerick

- Beairic na Trá
- Limerick
- Breach made in the front of the Strand Barracks after the siege of 21 July 1922

Site information
- Type: Barracks
- Operator: (Republic of Ireland) Irish Army

Location
- Location within Ireland
- Coordinates: 52.66738°N 8.63013°W

Site history
- Built: 1774
- Built for: War Office
- In use: 1774-1935

The Strand Barracks (Irish: Beairic na Trá) is a former army barracks on Clancy's Strand in Limerick city, Ireland.

== History ==
=== 1774 to 1800s ===
The barracks dates from the 18th century, founded in 1774, and lies on the banks of the River Shannon. It was a former workhouse called the House of Industry, built to help the destitute of Limerick city. The barrack-master in 1774 was Captain Matthew Manby (died 1774), father of George Manby.

=== British garrison ===
It later became a British Army barracks during the 19th century, until it was handed over to the Irish Free State. Amongst the last British regiments to leave the barracks were the Oxfordshire and Buckinghamshire Light Infantry 1st Battalion and the Royal Army Service Corps consisting of No. 1166 Motor Transport Company and Divisional Supply Column.

=== Irish garrison ===
Under the Anglo-Irish Treaty (which marked the end of the Irish War of Independence), the complex was handed over to troops of the Irish Free State on 1 March 1922. Due to escalating tensions between Free State and Anti-Treaty troops, the barracks were handed over to Anti-Treaty forces on 5 March 1922, as part of a truce agreement agreed between Liam Lynch, Commandant of the Republican Forces, and Commandant General Michael Brennan of the Free State's National Army. Towards the end of March 1922, the barracks was commanded by Connie (Mackey) McNamara.

At the height of the Irish Civil War, the barracks was besieged by Free State (National Army) troops under the command of Commandant General Michael Brennan between 15 and 20 July 1922. In the late evening of 20 July, Captain McNamara surrendered control of the barracks to the Free State forces. The bullet holes from the conflict are still visible in the neighbouring houses.

The Free State then used the barracks as a training depot, and troops there were used in the Cork and Kerry landings in August 1922. The barracks housed forces of the Free State's National Army through the remainder of the Irish Civil War and for 13 years was home to units of the Southern Command of the Irish Defence Forces. The barracks was then handed over to the Limerick Corporation in 1935.

=== 1930s to present ===
The site of the barracks was then taken over by Limerick Corporation and was used as a works yard. It passed out of the corporation hands in 1990, where it has now become the Castle Court complex of two-storey houses and apartments.

== See also ==
- List of Irish military installations
