= Mid Limerick Brigade =

The Mid Limerick Brigade was one of three Brigades of the Irish Republican Army operating in County Limerick in the Irish War of Independence and the Irish Civil War. The Brigade Commandant was Liam Forde. The other Brigades were the East Limerick Brigade and the West Limerick Brigade.

The Mid Limerick Brigade had four battalions.

- 2nd Battalion: Limerick City
- 3rd Battalion: Castleconnell and Murroe
- 4th Battalion: Caherconlish and Fedamore
- 5th Battalion: Patrickswell and Mare

1st Battalion was the original organisation in the city but it was no longer recognised by IRA GHQ at the time of the formation of the Mid Limerick Brigade.
