= Caudebec =

Caudebec is a place name that may refer to two places on the river Seine in France:

- Caudebec-en-Caux, Seine-Maritime, France
- Caudebec-lès-Elbeuf, Seine-Maritime, France, about 80 km (50 mi) upstream of Caudebec-en-Caux
