= Twin-screw steamer =

Type of steam powered ship

A twin-screw steamer (or steamship) (TSS) is a steam-powered vessel propelled by two screw propellers, one on either side of the plane of the keel.

== Arrangement ==
All propellers produce a transverse thrust, also called the screwing effect or starting bias, which gives a tendency for the end of the ship to move sideways. In twin-screw ships, the port propeller is usually left-handed and the starboard right-handed, to cancel out the transverse thrust and avoid propeller walk.
