= Submarine signals =

Marine hazard signaling system

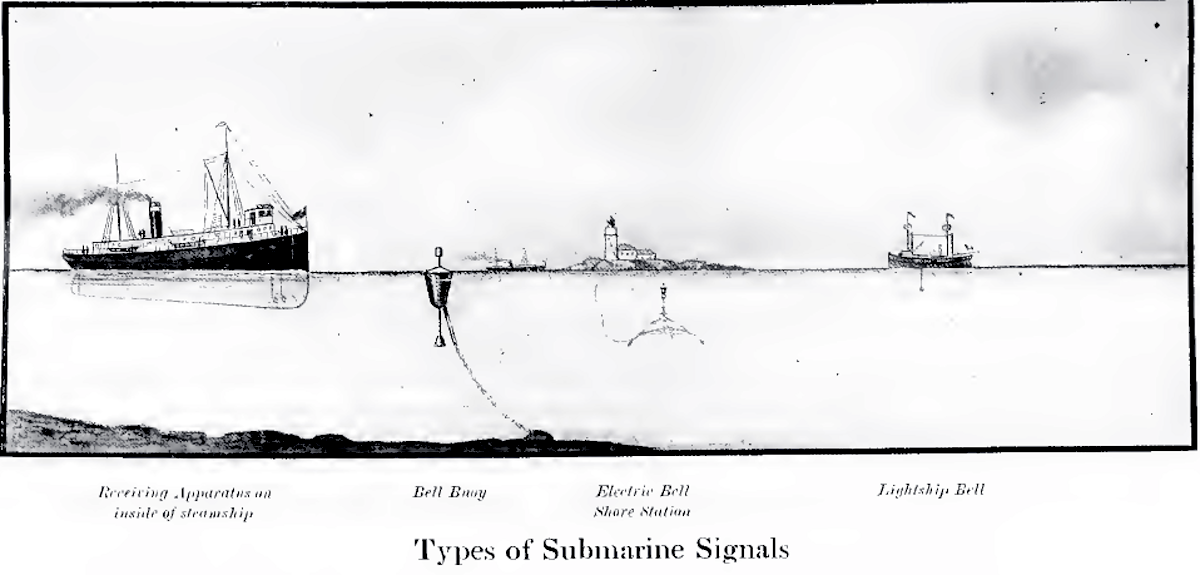
Types of Submarine Signals. (Submarine Signal Company)

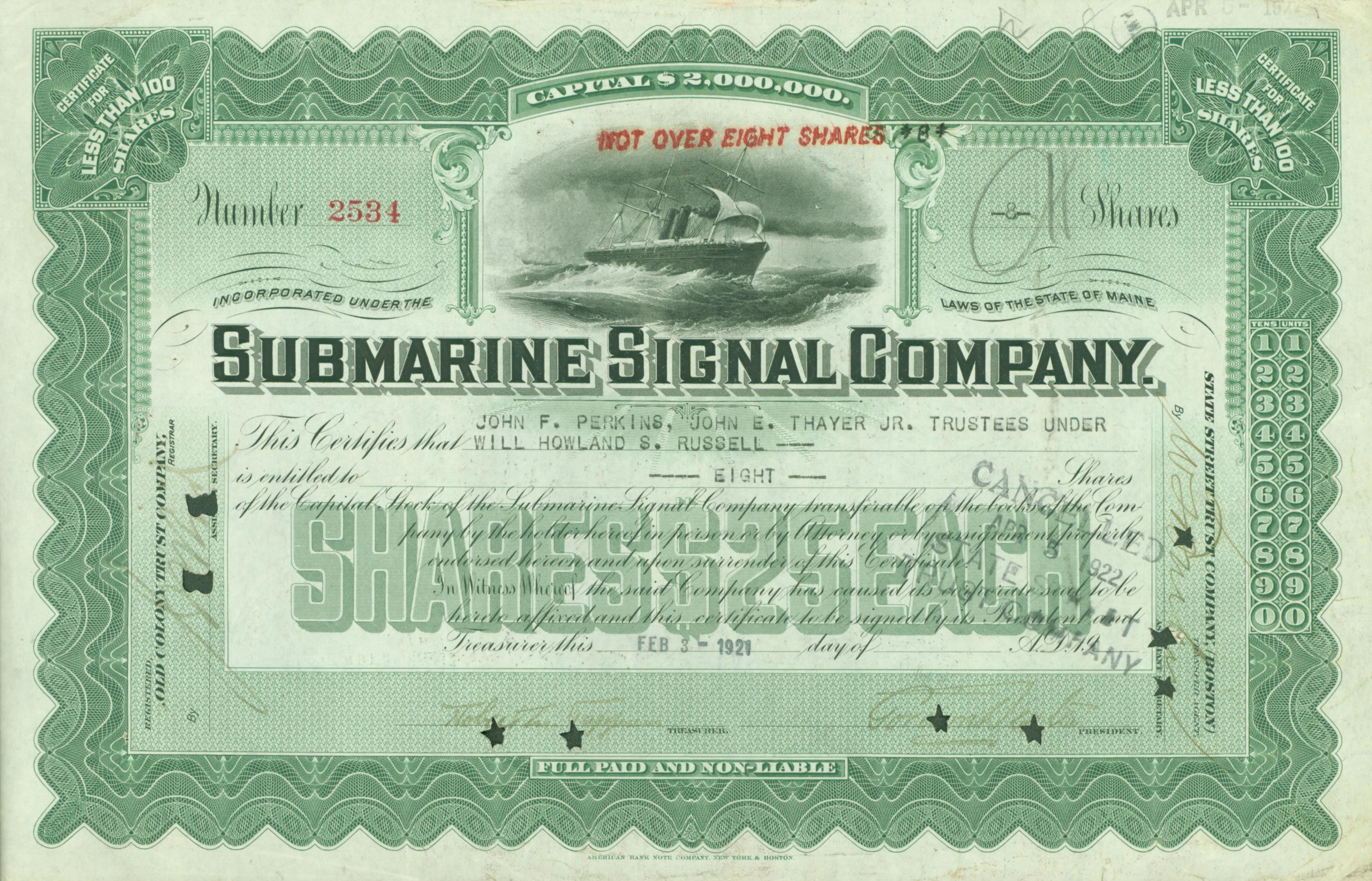
Share of the Submarine Signal Company, issued 3. February 1921)

Submarine signals had a specific, even proprietary, meaning in the early 20th century. It applied to a navigation aid system developed, patented and produced by the Submarine Signal Company of Boston. The company produced submarine acoustic signals, first bells and receivers then transducers, as aids to navigation. The signals were fixed, associated with lights and other fixed aids, or installed aboard ships enabling warning of fixed hazards or signaling between ships. ATLAS-Werke, at the time Norddeutsche Maschinen und Armaturenfabrik, of Germany also manufactured the equipment under license largely for the European market.

The system used more reliable underwater sound to project acoustic signals from a shore station or an undersea hazard on which a signal was placed. The signals were usually associated with a lightvessel, a bell buoy or hung on a tripod frame on the sea floor connected to a shore stations by cable. At first the system depended on bells operated by electric strikers. Receivers aboard ships could detect the acoustic signal and when equipped with receivers on each side the ship could determine approximate direction from which the signal came. A ship-to-ship system was also produced allowing ships so equipped to detect each other and estimate direction in fog. The company collected data from ships including ranges at which the signals of specific stations were detected. The collected data formed an early base of ocean acoustical properties. The original bells were quickly replaced by the Fessenden oscillator, a transducer, after its invention by Reginald Fessenden with development starting in 1912 at the Submarine Signal Company. That transducer allowed both sending and receiving leading to major advances in both submarine signals and extension into submarine telegraphy and experiments with underwater telephone communication and eventually sonar.

Ships, commercial or naval, equipped with submarine signaling capability had that equipment noted as one of the ship's navigation capabilities in registry information from the first decade of the century until nearly mid century. In 1907 the information was important to insurance underwriters and American Bureau of Shipping required that ships so equipped by indicated by the note "Sub. Sig." in ship's registry information. Commercial lines advertised the capability as a safety measure. Submarine signaling was made obsolescent and overtaken by advances during World War II.

In 1946 the Submarine Signal Company was acquired by and merged with Raytheon, becoming Raytheon's Marine Division, after having become the national leader in underwater sound, sonar and other work with the Navy during the World Wars and branching into other marine systems.

== Early research ==
In 1826 Jean-Daniel Colladon and Jacques Charles François Sturm used a submerged bell for experiments in Lake Geneva. Lucian I. Blake in association with the United States Lighthouse Service did similar work in 1883 using a submerged bell with the explicit purpose of using sound as an aid to navigation. Experiments in England and the United States occurred independently afterward.

Reception problems related to ship noise were partially solved when A. J. Munday, who had worked with Dr. Elisha Gray on signaling by underwater bells to include actual messages, found that a microphone placed in a metal box filled with water and attached to a ship's skin from inside allowed clear reception. In further experiments placement of such microphones on each side of a ship allowed finding the direction of the source. Intensity on one side showed the source to that side of the ship and equal intensity showed the source to be directly ahead. A direction indicator box allowed the selection of receivers individually for comparison of signal strength for direction.

Experiments determined modifications to bells used in air that optimized them for underwater use. Electrical striking systems allowed the bells to be connected to surface aids. Canadian experiments showed the practicality of determining direction by comparison of the reception by two receivers mounted on each side of a vessel's bow.

== Commercial production ==
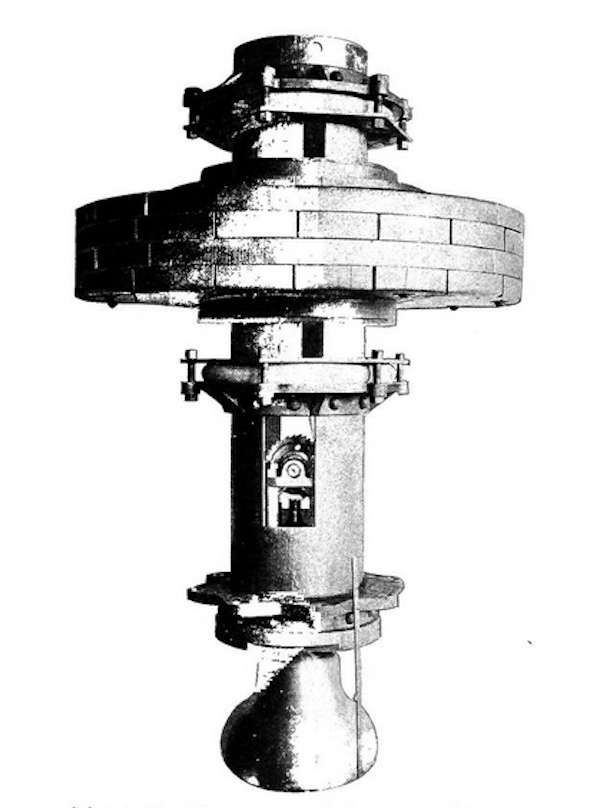
Submarine Signal Buoy Apparatus to be attached to Bell-buoys.

The Submarine Signal Company, was established in Boston, Massachusetts, to turn the research into a navigational aid. The company developed, patented and began manufacturing electromechanical bell signals and shipboard receivers based on previous research, introducing the world's first electronic underwater acoustic navigation aid in 1901. (Note: Boston corporate offices were located at 88 Broad Street with a plant, known as the Submarine Signal Building, at 160 Washington Street. Other offices in 1907 were: New York at 68 Broad Street; London at 72 Victoria Street; Liverpool at 10 Duke Street; Germany represented by Norddeutsche Maschinenund Armaturenfabrik, Bremen.)

The signal system was of particular importance for safe navigation in fog. Fog signals, horns and whistles, conducted by air were unreliable and erratic. Sonic signals through water were more reliable and had more range. Offshore hazards could be marked by a tripod mounted bell connected to a shore station by cable. A similar system of underwater bells mounted on ships enabled signaling between ships to avoid collisions in fog. The Cunard liner Lucania was equipped with the first ship-to-ship submarine signal device.

The United States Lighthouse Board had some interest, but they did not take immediate action. The British Admiralty and Trinity House and, in Germany, the North German Lloyd Steamship Company took more immediate notice of the potential and became pioneers in implementation both at signal stations and as shipboard receivers. The German company Norddeutsche Maschinen und Armaturenfabrik (1902), becoming Atlas Werke in 1911, manufactured the system under license from the Submarine Signal Company. Major lines were equipping it ships with the apparatus so that in 1905, Cunard announced its entire fleet would have the apparatus after its experience with Lucania and Norddeutscher Lloyd liners Kaiser Wilhelm II, Kronprinz Wilhelm and Kaiser Wilhelm der Grosse were successfully using the system. An example of significant commercial advantage, being able to operate when other ships were fog bound, was a case in which the liner Kaiser Wilhelm II was able to enter harbor twenty-two hours before the fog at the Weser river mouth cleared and other vessels could enter port. By using the submarine signals of the entrance lightvessel the ship was able to enter the fog clear harbor to discharge passengers and cargo.

The Admiralty conducted tests in October 1906 using a bell such as was used by U.S. lightvessels. The tests were successful, with the Admiralty recommending their use as a coastal navigation aid with notes on the possible ship-to-ship use to warn and establish direction of another ship in fog. There was also notation of use between submarines and "parent ships", with some of the submarine results withheld from publication as purely military in application. Experience of U.S. Navy battleships in fog off Nantucket Shoals proved the fleet could, under reduced speed, safely navigate and maintain formation by using the signals.

=== Installations ===
On March 3, 1905, an act in the United States had authorized funding for aids including submarine signals. The U.S. lighthouse authorities were by the summer of 1906 installing signals, specifically at lightvessels stationed at Boston, Pollock Rip, Nantucket, Fire Island, and Sandy Hook. The United States and Canada were placing the signals at important locations. The U.S. Lighthouse Board was ordering systems for the Gulf of Mexico and Britain had adopted the system for all its aids to navigation. In 1910, the report of the United States Department of Commerce showed forty-nine signals established by June 30, most on lightvessels. Extension into the Great Lakes revealed a problem with the forepeak receiver installation for seagoing ships operated in light condition in fresh water. The forepeak was almost out of the water, thus reducing the effectiveness and requiring a solution by the Submarine Signal Company.

By 1907, the signals were in common use, with most large ships equipped with the receiving apparatus. The receiving apparatus had evolved from a simple receiver on the ship's bottom to two hydrophones in water-filled sea chests on each side of the ship, enabling the ship to determine the direction from which the signal came. The Submarine Signal Company, with branches in Bremen, Liverpool, London, and New York, was both manufacturing the apparatus and collecting data from shipping companies and individual ships on the operation of the signals.

The utility of the signals became evident as more stations and ships were equipped. Prominent ship captains, such as James Watt, master of Lusitania, strongly endorsed the system. Marine underwriters needed information on which ships were equipped to adjust risk for vessel and cargo insurance. The American Bureau of Shipping included whether a vessel was equipped with submarine signal apparatus as a part of the registry information along with wireless. Registers making note of navigation equipment of yachts and ships listed "Submarine Signal system" or "Sub.Sig." as seen in the yacht Noma and Lloyd's Register, column two, "Special surveys" for ships.

=== Technological advances ===
The Submarine Signal Company was the first company engaged in underwater acoustics, becoming the national underwater sound experts and producing acoustical aids to navigation. It also became the major sonar supplier to the U.S. Navy in later years.

A technique termed "synchronous signaling" combined bell signals with coordinated radio dot signals for direct distance to the signal without use of stopwatches. The radio dots would follow a bell strike sequence and the number of dots received before the next bell signal would indicate the distance in half miles. The stations with the capability and precise method to use the combined radio, including stations transmitting radio direction finding signals, and submarine signal were published in nautical notices and tables.

The Fessenden oscillator, invented by Submarine Signal Company's consulting engineer Reginald Fessenden in 1913 and developed and manufactured in 1914, was a transducer that was easier to install and maintain, could both send and receive, and also allowed coded communication between any two installations, including submarines. Bells were quickly phased out and transducer equipped installations remained active until World War II. The bells had been adequate to send signals, even coded strikes for identification, but the company had been seeking a method of acoustical communications. The oscillator accomplished that and led to further developments in underwater acoustics. The company acted quickly to replace the bells with the transducers and began working on their use in submarine telegraphy, but it was slow to recognize or take advantage of the sonic distance measurement of interest to Fessenden so that others took the lead in SOund NAvigation Ranging, now generally simply known as sonar.

== Submarine signals during war ==
Submarine Signal Company's focus with the Fessenden device was on submarine telegraphy, with a beginning in submarine telephones. With marine radio gaining usage, the expensive submarine version faded. Despite Fessenden's demonstration in June 1914 of the effectiveness of his device in telegraphy, that aspect faded and the "sensing" potential, first crudely applied to locating icebergs, became critical with World War I and submarine warfare.

Full focus came to underwater acoustics and the potential to detect submarines by sound, either passively or actively. The existing receivers, designed to detect intentional signals, proved unable to detect the incidental sounds of submarines. Harold J. W. Fay of Submarine Signal Company was invited to meet with the Chief, Bureau of Steam Engineering 20 March 1917 to discuss establishing an acoustical research station at East Point, Nahant, Massachusetts. Fay gave assurances property would be made available. As implemented, Submarine Signal Company would be joined by Western Electric Company and General Electric Company to work on the project. On 8–9 May, representatives of the companies met in Washington to establish working relationships.

To meet concerns of the Naval Consulting Board that naval interests might not be met in general research, a Navy Special Board on Anti-Submarine Devices would oversee the work. Commander Clyde Stanley McDowell was secretary of the board and later filled the same function at the Naval Experimental Station, New London, Connecticut. The Nahant Antisubmarine Laboratory, completed April 7, 1917, was the first anti-submarine acoustical laboratory of the Navy. The laboratory, a cluster of buildings behind guarded security fencing, was where "submarine signals" research entered the new field of anti-submarine acoustics. (Note: The field of anti-submarine acoustics grew again during World War II and "exploded" with the Cold War. Major funds went to research and applications for such efforts as the Cold War Sound Surveillance System. Laboratories and projects dedicated themselves to understand and apply underwater acoustics.)

The submarine signals as navigational aids, just as many lights went dark, were stopped so as not to aid enemy submarines or become gathering points for target ships.

== Submarine Signal Company merger with Raytheon ==
During World War I and after, the Submarine Signal Company expanded into fathometers and other marine electronics, including radio direction finders and radiotelephones, as acoustic aids faded in importance with the growing importance and adoption of radio navigation. In 1946, the company was acquired by and merged with the American Appliance Company, later Raytheon, to become that company's Marine Division responsible for all products with marine applications.
