= 192 =

192 may refer to:

- 192 BC
- AD 192
- 192 (number)

== Roads ==
- U.S. Route 192
- Connecticut Route 192
- Illinois Route 192
- Maryland Route 192
- New York State Route 192
- Pennsylvania Route 192
- Alabama State Route 192
- California State Route 192
- Georgia State Route 192
- Virginia State Route 192
- Japan National Route 192
- Arkansas Highway 192
- Iowa Highway 192
- Wyoming Highway 192

== Military ==
- No. 192 Squadron RAF
- 192d Airlift Squadron
- 192d Fighter Wing
- 192nd Tank Battalion
- 192nd Military Police Battalion
- 192nd Infantry Division (France)

== Music ==
- 192TV
- 192 (album)
- 192 (song)

== Transportation and motorsport ==
- Jordan 192
- Greater Manchester bus route 192
- 192 (MBTA bus)
- 192 (New Jersey bus)

== Other uses ==
- 192.com
- Minuscule 192
- Radical 192

== See also ==
- 192nd (disambiguation)
- 19-2 (2011 TV series), French-language Canadian police crime drama television series
- 19-2 (2014 TV series), adapted English-language Canadian television series
