= 192nd =

192nd may refer to:

- 192nd (Crow's Nest Pass) Battalion, CEF, a unit in the Canadian Expeditionary Force during the First World War
- 192nd Infantry Brigade (United States), an infantry brigade of the United States Army
- 192nd Infantry Division (France), a French infantry division during World War II
- 192nd Military Police Battalion, a National Guard battalion assigned to the Connecticut Army National Guard
- 192nd Ohio Infantry (or 192nd OVI), an infantry regiment in the Union Army during the American Civil War
- 192nd Tank Battalion, a federalized US Army National Guard unit activated in November 1940

== See also ==
- 192 (number)
- AD 192, the year 192 (CXCII) of the Julian calendar
- 192 BC
