= Demi-Brigade of the Foreign Legion in Indochina =

Demi-Brigade of the Foreign Legion Demi-brigade de Légion étrangère
- Active: 2 August 1930 - 1 September 1930
- Country: France
- Branch: French Army
- Type: Infantry

The Demi-Brigade of the Foreign Legion, (French: Demi-brigade de Légion étrangère) existed briefly in Indochina while regrouping the ensemble of the Battalion Forming Corps (French: « bataillon formant corps », BFC) issued from the 1st Foreign Infantry Regiment 1^{er} REI. The Demi-Brigade would become on 1 September 1930 the 5th Foreign Infantry Regiment (French: 5^{e} Régiment étranger d’infanterie).

== Creation and different nominations ==
- 2 August 1930: formation of the Demi-Brigade of the Foreign Legion;
- On 1 September 1930 : change in designation from Demi-Brigade to 5th Foreign Infantry Regiment (5^{e} REI).

== History, garrisons, campaigns and battles ==
On 1 September 1930 the BFC of the 1st Foreign Infantry Regiment 1^{er} REI and the 1st battalion of the 1^{er} REI newly arrived in the Far East allowed the constitution of four battalions of the 5th Foreign Infantry Regiment 5^{e} REI:

- The 4^{e} BFC became the I/5^{e} REI : 1st battalion of the 5^{e} REI
- The 7^{e} BFC became the II/5^{e} REI: 2nd battalion of the 5^{e} REI
- The 9^{e} BFC became the III/5^{e} REI : 3rd battalion of the 5^{e} REI
- The 1st battalion of the 1^{er} REI became the IIII/ 5^{e} REI : 4th battalion of the 5^{e} REI

Nevertheless, the BFC (Battalion Forming Corps) (French: « bataillon formant corps ») remained until 1 April 1931.

== Regimental Commanders ==
- Demi-Brigade of the Foreign Legion in Indochina (2 to 31 August 1930).
  - 1930 : Lieutenant-colonel Debas Jean.
- 9^{e} BFC of the 1^{er} REI
  - 1926: Chef de bataillon Prieur.
  - 1927: Chef de bataillon Maire.
  - 1929: Chef de bataillon Lorillard
- 7^{e} BFC of the 1^{er} REI
  - 1927 - 1929: Chef de bataillon Boutry
  - 1929 - 1930: Chef de bataillon Kratzert
- 4^{e} BFC of the 1^{er} REI
  - 1930: Chef de bataillon Lambert.

== See also ==
- Major (France)
- French Foreign Legion Music Band (MLE)
- Armored Train of the Foreign Legion
- Disciplinary Company of the Foreign Regiments in the Far East
