= 6th Foreign Infantry Regiment =

- 6^{e} régiment étranger d'infanterie
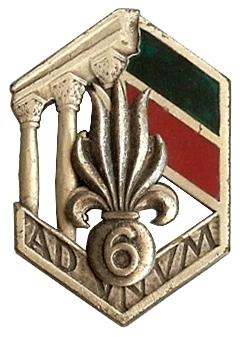
- Regimental Insignia of 6^{e} REI Type II
- Active: 1939–1940; 1949–1955
- Disbanded: 1940; 1955
- Country: France
- Branch: French Army
- Type: Infantry
- Size: 3,300
- Motto: AD UNUM (All to one End)
- Colors: Green & Red
- Engagements: Camerone 1863 Battle of Messifre; World War II: Syria-Lebanon Campaign; First Indochina War Algerian War

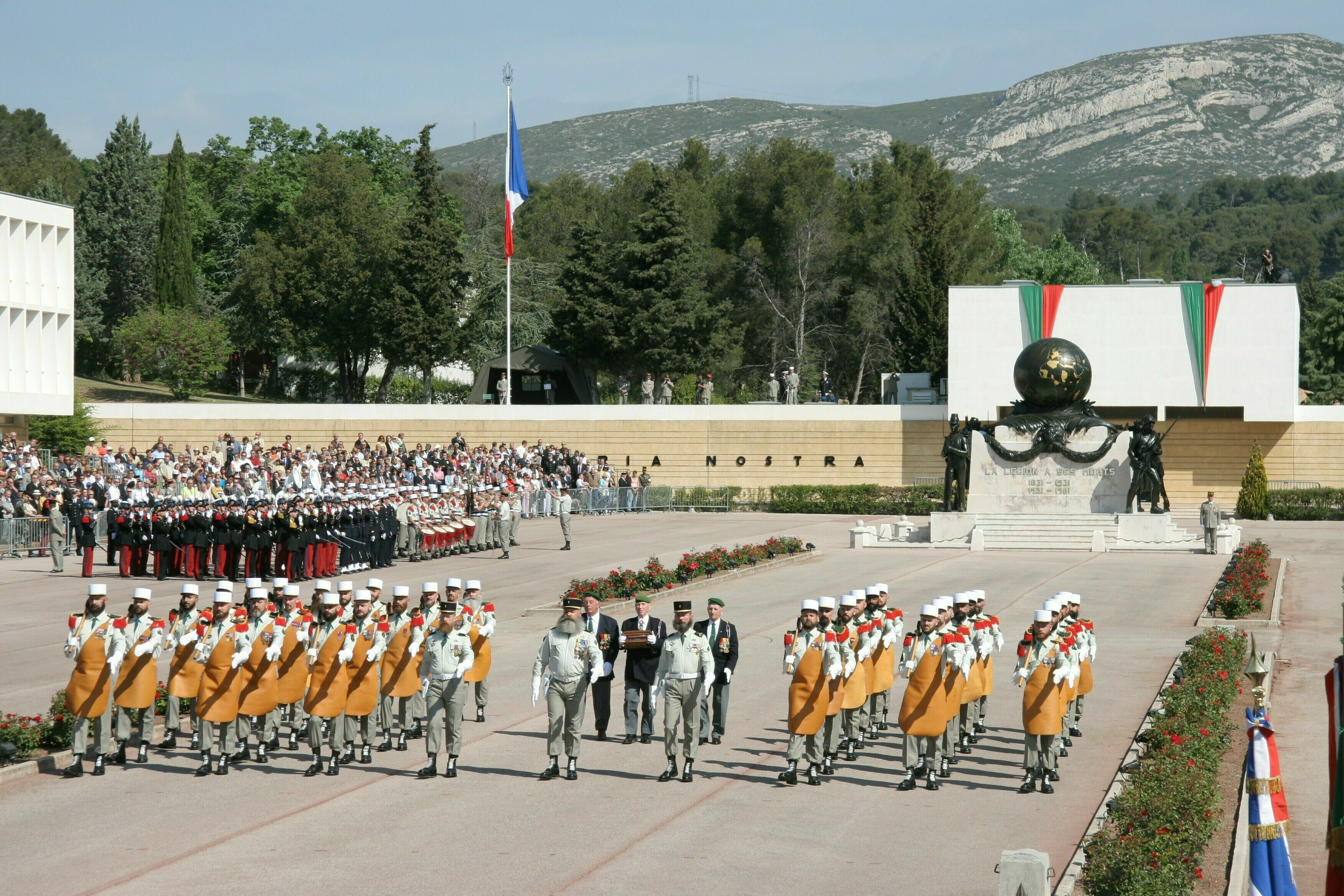
Each year, the Legion commemorates and celebrates Camarón in its headquarters in Aubagne and Bastille Day military parade in Paris; featuring the Pionniers leading and opening the way.

The 6th Foreign Infantry Regiment (French: 6^{e} Régiment Étranger d'Infanterie, 6^{e} REI) was an infantry regiment of the Foreign Legion in the French Army from 1939 to 1941 and again from 1949 to 1955.

== History, creations and different nominations ==
When first established the 6th Foreign Infantry Regiment consisted of 3,287 men. It was part of the 192nd Infantry Division. The regiment's organization featured:

- HQ Staff, located at Homs
- 1st Battalion, formerly 4th Battalion of the 1st Foreign Infantry Regiment, garrisoned at Al-Suwayda.
- 2nd Battalion, formerly 1st Battalion of the 1st Foreign Infantry Regiment, garrisoned at Baalbek.
- 3rd Battalion, formerly 2nd Battalion of the 2nd Foreign Infantry Regiment, garrisoned at Damascus.
- 4th Battalion, formerly 6th Battalion of the 1st Foreign Infantry Regiment, garrisoned at Homs and Palmyra.

This regiment was designated as the "Legion Regiment of the French Levant" (French: Régiment du Levant de La Légion étrangère).

On 1 January 1940 the regiment was formulated in two parts:

- A mountain regiment, commanded by Lieutenant-colonel Barre, which became on 19 March the same year the 6th Foreign Infantry Regiment, 6^{e} R.E.I, Integrated at the 192nd Infantry Division, 192^{e} D.I; the regiment constituted:
  - 1 Headquarter Staff
  - 1 Command Company
  - 1 Regimental Company (created March 1940 and designated (French: compagnie régimentaire d’engins, C.R.E))
  - 1 Exterior Company (designated "CHR",(French: compagnie hors rang, C.H.R))
  - 1st Battalion
  - 2nd Battalion
- One motorized regiment typed outre-mer, which would become on 19 March the Foreign Legion Groupment of the Levant (French: Groupement de Légion étrangère du Levant, G.L.E.L); the regiment constituted:
  - 1 Headquarter Staff
  - 1 Command Section
  - 3rd Battalion
  - 4th Battalion
  - Legion Special Section

On 28 April 1940 the 1st Marching Battalion of Foreign Volunteers (French: Bataillon de Marche des Volontaires étrangers, 1er BMVE), created in March 1940, was assigned to the 6th Foreign Infantry Regiment, 6^{e} R.E.I and became the 11th Battalion of Foreign Volunteers (French: 11e bataillon de volontaires étrangers, 11e B.V.E) until dissolution on 16 October 1940.

On 1 January 1941 the Foreign Legion Groupment of the Levant (French: Groupement de Légion étrangère du Levant, G.L.E.L) and under the authority of the 6th Foreign Infantry Regiment created a Legion Artillery Group of the Levant (French: Groupe d’Artillerie de Légion du Levant, G.A.L.L) comprising 3 artillery batteries and the reorganization of the 6th Foreign Infantry Regiment: the "C.H.R" and the "C.R.E" were dissolved and the command company became the regimental company.

The regiment left Lebanon on 16 August 1941 and rejoined the Camp Idron (Pau) on 25 August before rejoining Sidi-bel-Abbès on 3 December 1941.

During the regiment's dissolution on 31 December 1941, the legionnaires of the 6th Foreign Infantry Regiment were assigned to the later reconstituted 1st Foreign Marching Infantry Regiment (French: 1e Régiment Etranger d'Infanterie de Marche, 1er R.E.I.M) and the Marching Regiment of the Foreign Legion (French: Régiment de Marche de la Légion Etrangère, R.M.L.E).

The 6th Foreign Infantry Regiment, 6^{e} R.E.I was recreated on 1 April 1949 in Tunisia. Accordingly, selection and dispatching were regularly done in order to reinforce Legion units engaged in combats in Indochina. In the meantime and while holding tenure in Tunisia, the regiment was assigned to tasks revolving around missions of maintaining order. Subsequently, the regiment was dissolved for a second time on 30 June 1955.

== History of the garrisons, campaigns and battles ==
The 6th Foreign Infantry Regiment, 6^{e} R.E.I was founded on 15 October 1939 in Syria from elements of the disbanded 1st Foreign Infantry Regiment, 1er R.E.I and the 2nd Foreign Infantry Regiment. The Regiment was established in part to handle the large number of foreign volunteers for French military service at the beginning of World War II, which numbered around 64,000 at the regiment's founding. The 6th Foreign Infantry Regiment remained loyal to Vichy France at the beginning of World War II while opposing fraternally allied and foreign forces from 8 June to 24 July 1941, mainly within the cadre of the liberation of Lebanon. Following, the 6th Foreign Infantry Regiment was disbanded on 31 December 1941.

On the other hand, the regiment was founded once more in Tunisia on 1 April 1949. The regiment went on to fight in the First Indochina War. Following service in Indochina, the regiment operated in Tunisia as part of French operations to maintain order. The Regiment was disbanded on 30 June 1955.

== Tradition ==
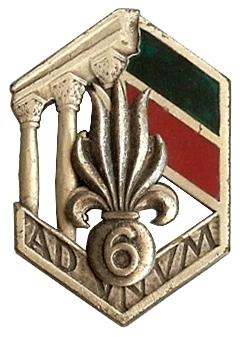
Regimental Insignia of the 6^{e} REI.

=== Insignia ===
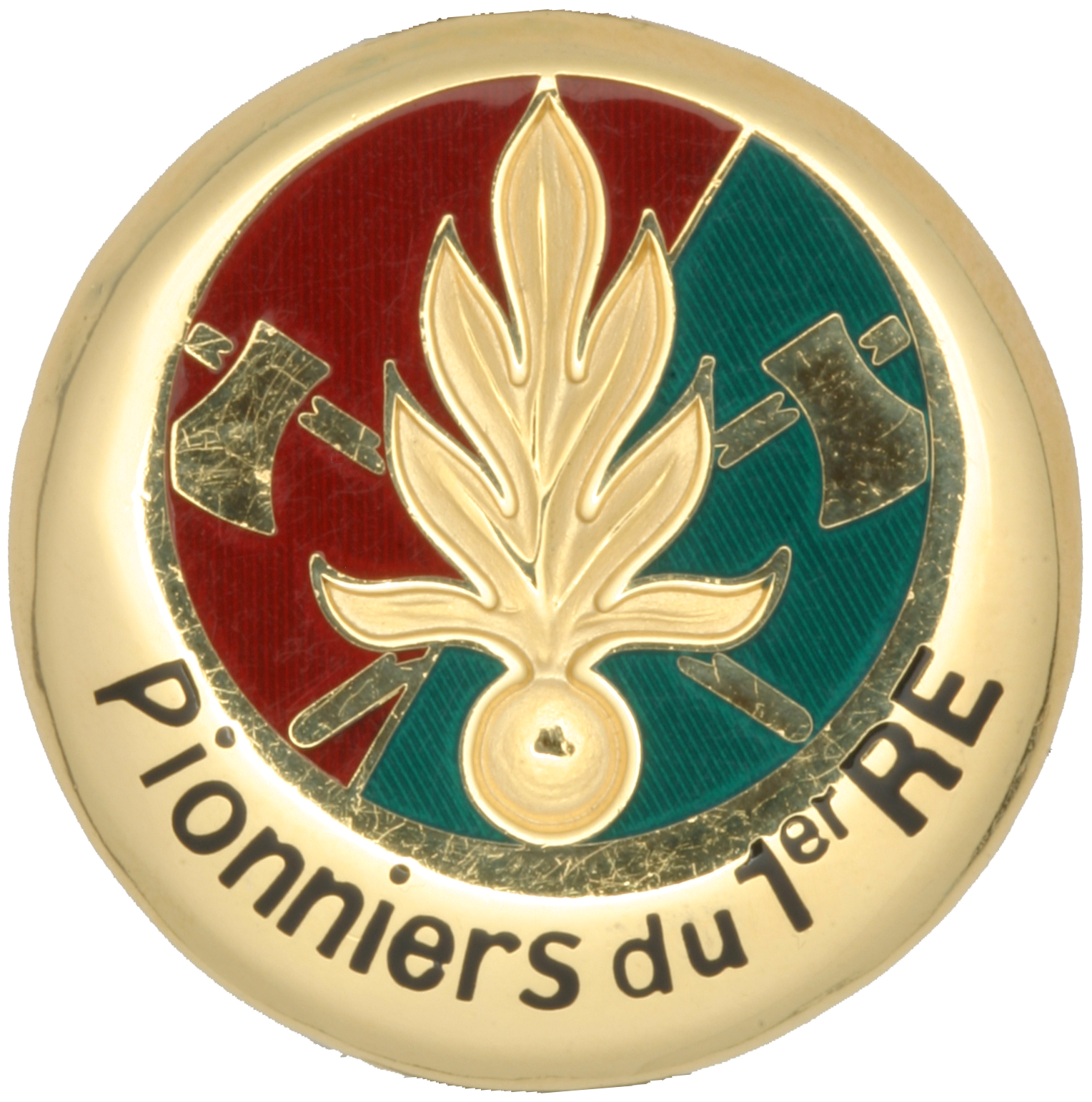
Insignia of the Pionniers of the 1st Foreign Regiment.

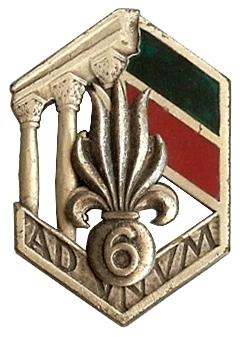
Regimental Insignia of 6^{e} REI Type II

The insignia of the 6th Foreign Infantry Regiment is represented by the form of a hexagon, three Roman columns of the temple of Jupiter at Baalbek to the left of the insign and the symbols of the Foreign Legion: red and green colors with the grenade with 7 flames in the center.

=== Regimental Colors ===
Regimental Colors of the 6th Foreign Infantry Regiment, 6^{e} R.E.I

=== Honors ===
==== Battle Honors ====
- Camarón 1863
- Musseifer 1925
- Syria 1925-1926

== Regimental Commander ==
6th Foreign Infantry Regiment, Formation I

- Colonel Imhaus (1/10/1939 - 20/12/1939)
- Lieutenant-colonel Barre (20/12/1939 - 10/1941 )
- Lieutenant-colonel Delore (10/1941 - 12/1941)

6th Foreign Engineer Regiment, Formation II
01 04/1949 au 01 07/1955

- Lieutenant-colonel René Babonneau
- Lieutenant-colonel Rossi
- Chef de bataillon Georgeon

== Notable Officers ==
- Captain Pierre Segrétain, later regimental commander in the rank of chef de bataillon (commandant) of the 1st Foreign Parachute Battalion, killed in action in Indochina in October 1950 during the evacuation of Cao-Bang by the RC4.
- Lieutenant Pierre Jeanpierre, survivor of the battle of RC4, later regimental commander of Lieutenant Colonel of the 1st Foreign Parachute Regiment, killed in action in Algeria in May 1958.
- Sous-lieutenant then Lieutenant Pepin Lehalleur, 1st battalion of the 6th Foreign Infantry Regiment, who would become général.
- Lieutenant Houzel.
- Captain Serge Andolenko, headed the CR of the regiment in 1941, became général, after being regimental commander of the 5th Foreign Infantry Regiment in Algeria (1956-1958).

== See also ==
- Major (France)
- French Foreign Legion Music Band (MLE)
- Raoul Magrin-Vernerey, the first regimental commander of the 13th Demi-Brigade of the Foreign Legion
- 1st Free French Division
