= 19-2 =

19-2 may refer to:

- 19-2 (2011 TV series), a French-language series
- 19-2 (2014 TV series), an English-language series

== See also ==
- 192
- 17 (number), equal to nineteen minus two
