= Boudin =

Types of sausage

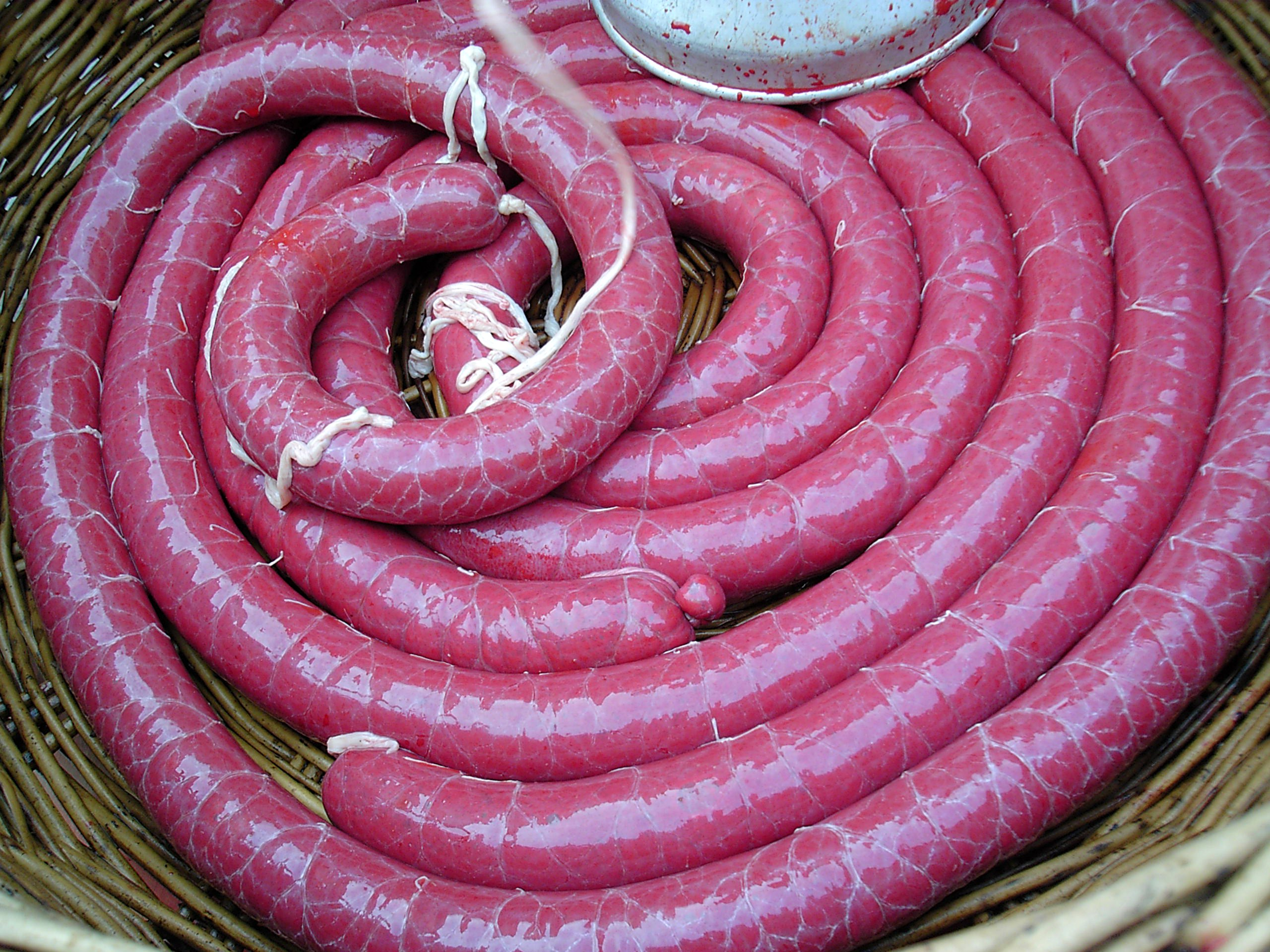
Boudin noir, before cooking

Boudin (French pronunciation: [budɛ̃]) is a category of sausage - typically blood sausage - found in several French-speaking cultures. The added ingredients vary in French, Luxembourgish, Belgian, Swiss, Québecois, Acadian, Aostan, Louisiana Creole, and Cajun cuisine. Some variations such as boudin blanc contain no blood but retain the name.

== Etymology ==
The Anglo-Norman word boudin meant 'sausage', 'blood sausage', or 'entrails' in general. Its origin is unclear. It has been traced both to Romance and to Germanic roots, but there is not good evidence for either (cf. boudin). The English word pudding probably comes, via the Germanic word puddek for sausage, from boudin.

Some modern chefs, such as John Folse and Olivier Poels, attribute boudin to ancient Greece by way of Aphtonite, to whom they attribute the first mention of boudin noir in the Apicius.

== Types ==
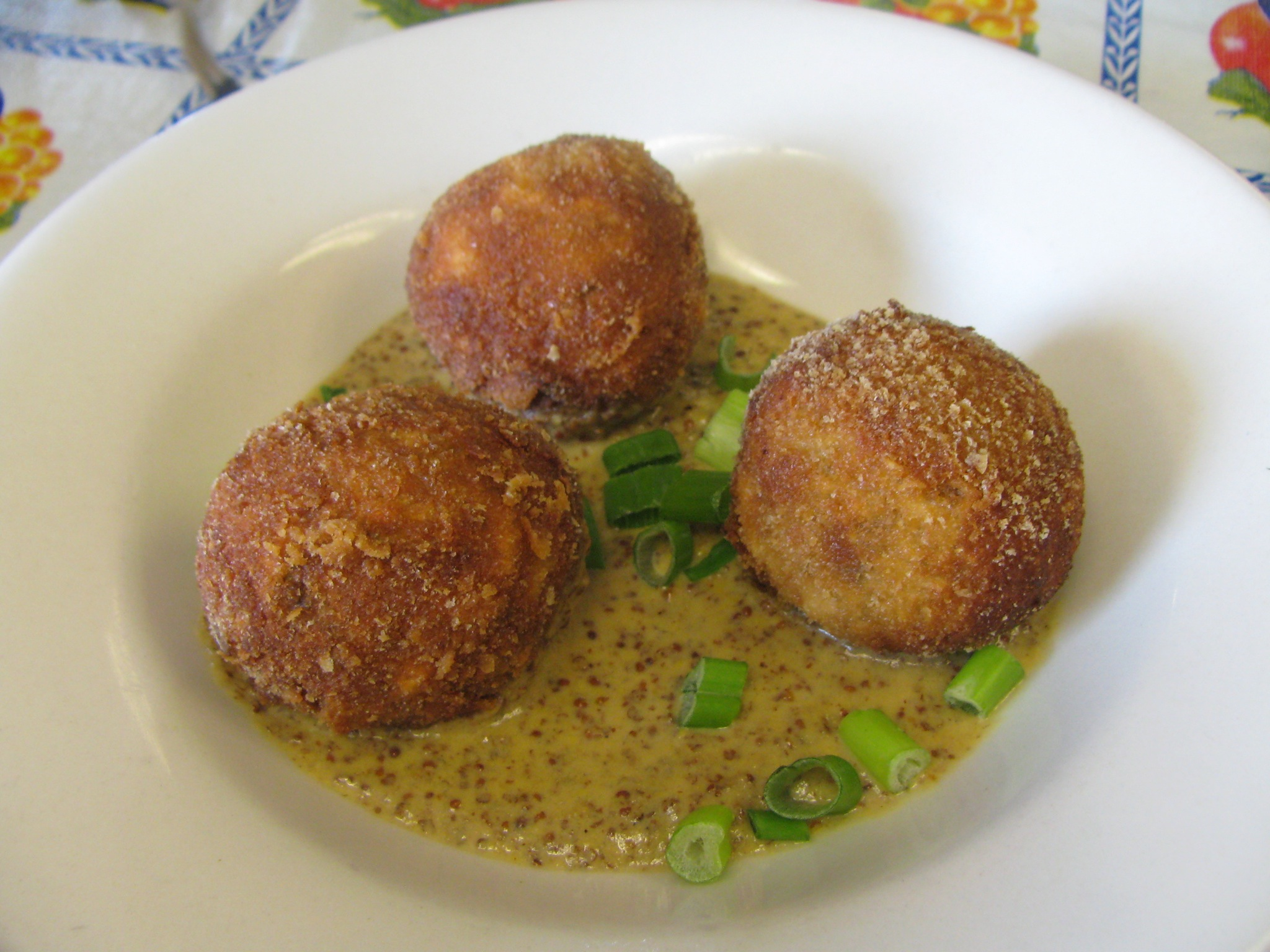
South Louisiana boudin balls

- Boudin ball: A Cajun variation on boudin blanc. Instead of the filling being stuffed into pork casings, it is rolled into a ball, battered, and deep-fried.
- Boudin blanc: Originally, a white sausage made of pork without the blood. Variants include:
  - French boudin blanc, with milk. Generally sautéed or grilled.
  - Boudin blanc de Liège: A Belgian version similar to French boudin blanc but with marjoram, which has a protected geographical indication.
  - Cajun boudin blanc, made from a mixture of pork, rice, onions, and seasonings similar to dirty rice and stuffed into sausage casings. Local variations may also include liver or other pork offal, or other meats such as venison, alligator, shrimp, and crawfish, and can vary in spiciness.
  - Boudin blanc de Rethel (pronounced [bu.dɛ̃ blɑ̃ də ʁə.tɛl]): a traditional French boudin, which may only contain pork meat, fresh whole eggs and milk, and cannot contain any breadcrumbs or flours/starches. It is protected under EU law with a Protected geographical indication status.
- Boudin noir: A dark-hued blood sausage, containing pork, pig blood, and other ingredients. Variants of the boudin noir occur in French, Belgian, Cajun and Catalan cuisine. The Catalan version of the boudin noir is called botifarra negra. In the French Caribbean, it is known as boudin Créole or by local names, such as boudin rouge Antillais in Guadeloupe, and infused with spice or rum. In Britain a similar sausage is called "black pudding", the word "pudding" being an anglicized pronunciation of boudin, and probably introduced after the Norman Conquest.
  - Boudin rouge: In Louisiana cuisine, a sausage similar to Cajun boudin blanc with pork blood added to it, though less commonly made. This originated from the French boudin noir.
- Boudin vert: A green sausage made of pork meat and cabbage and kale. Popular in the Belgian province of Walloon Brabant and in the Walloon immigrant areas of the Door Peninsula of Wisconsin where it is called Belgian Trippe.
- Boudin valdôtain: with beetroot, spices, wine and beef or pork blood. in the Aosta Valley of Italy.
- Brown-rice boudin: Brown-rice boudin is a less common variation made from brown rice with taste similar to traditional pork boudin.
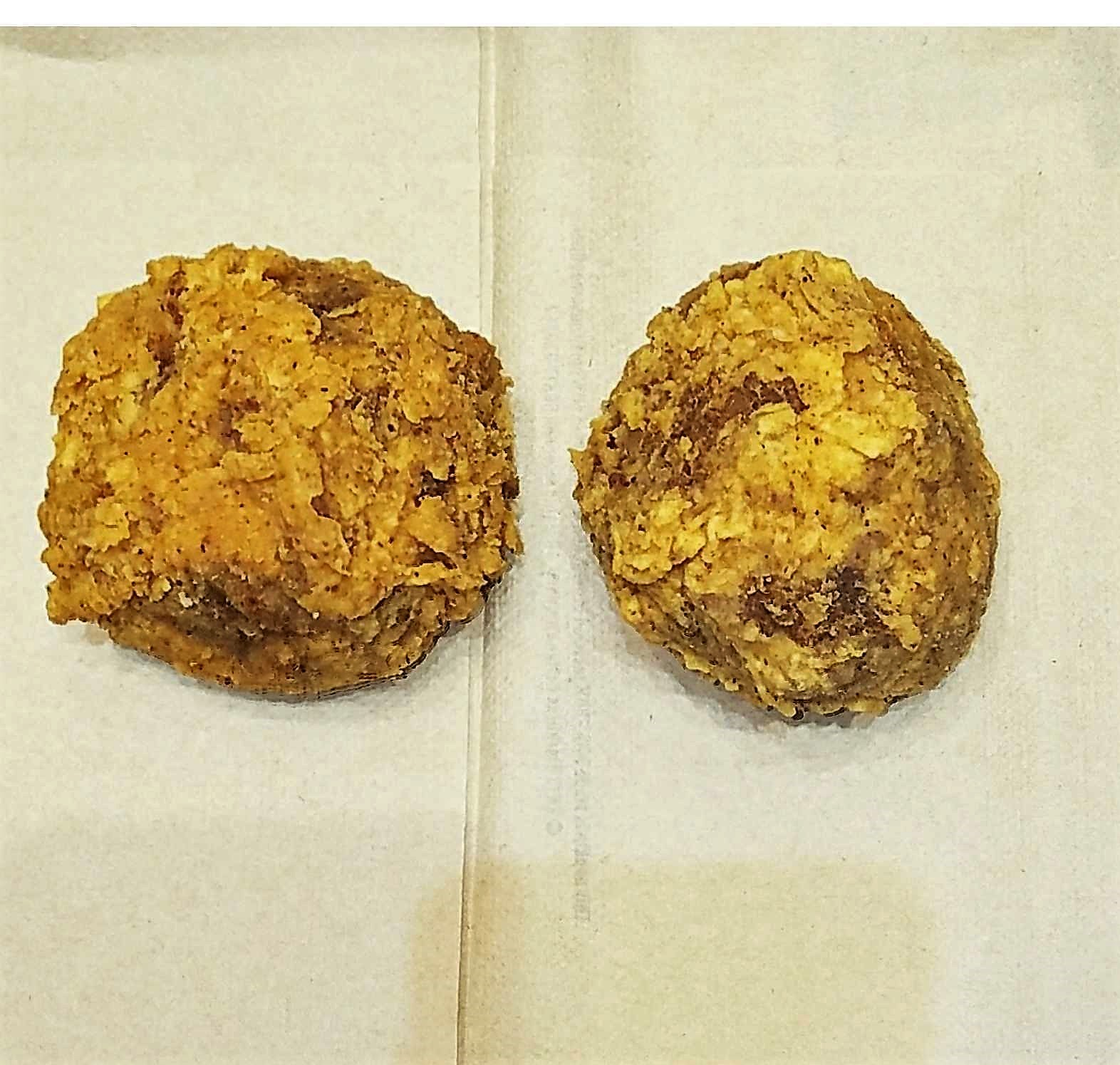
Boudin balls, made in Marksville, Louisiana.

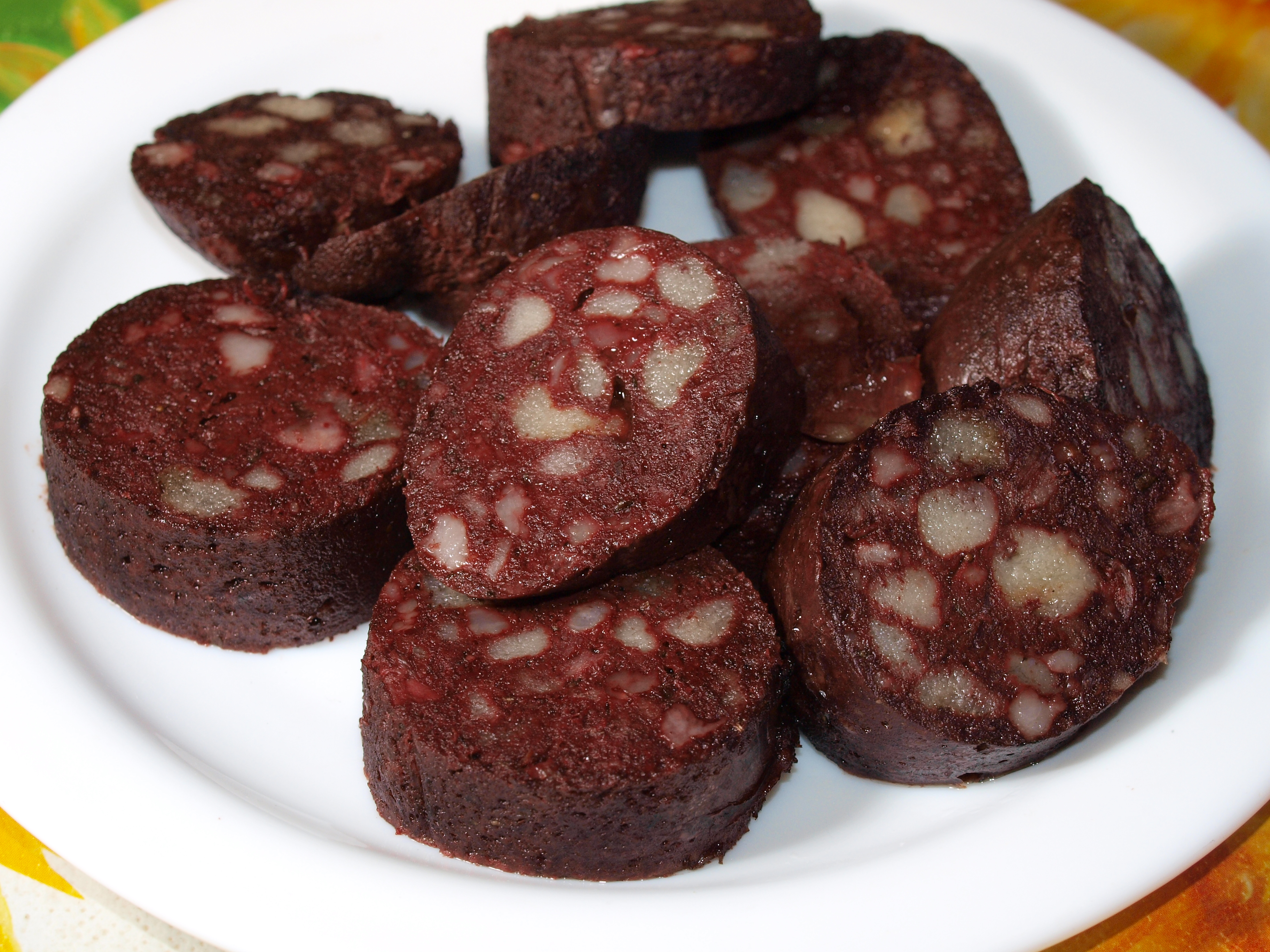
A sliced French boudin noir

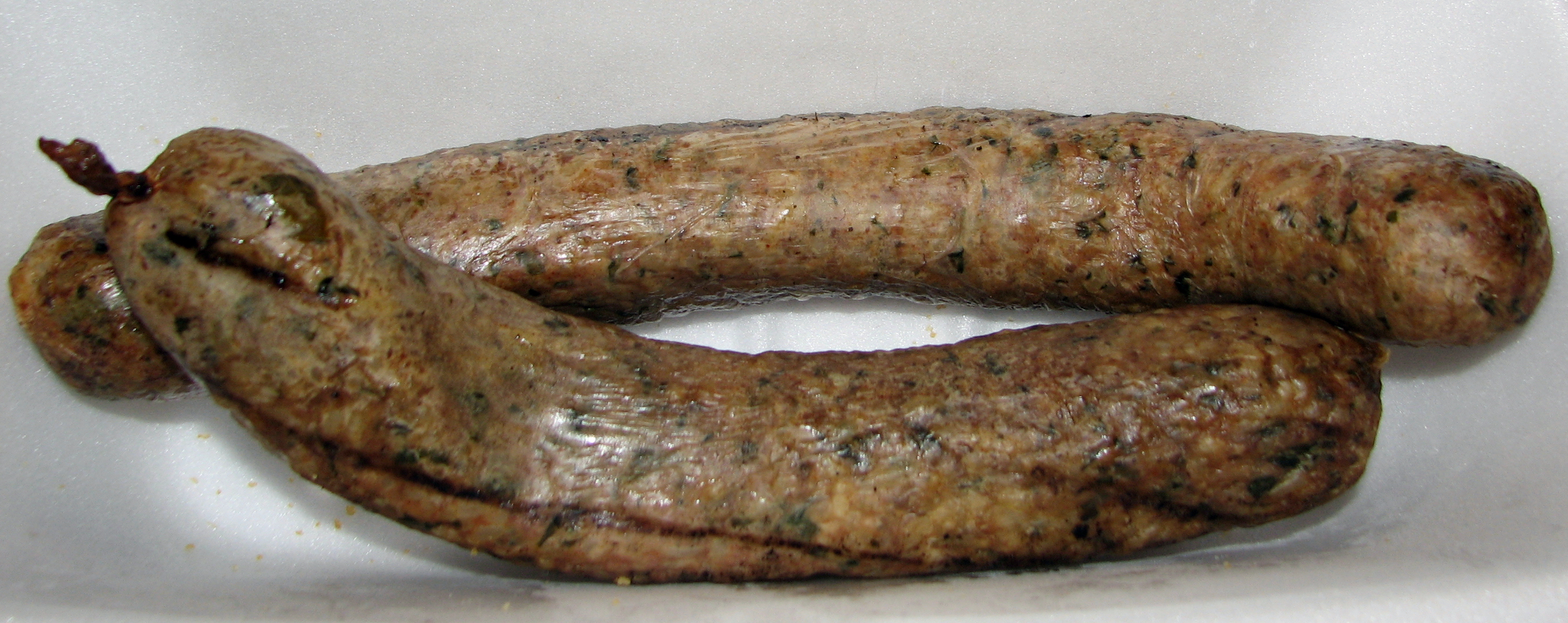
Cajun-style smoked boudin blanc

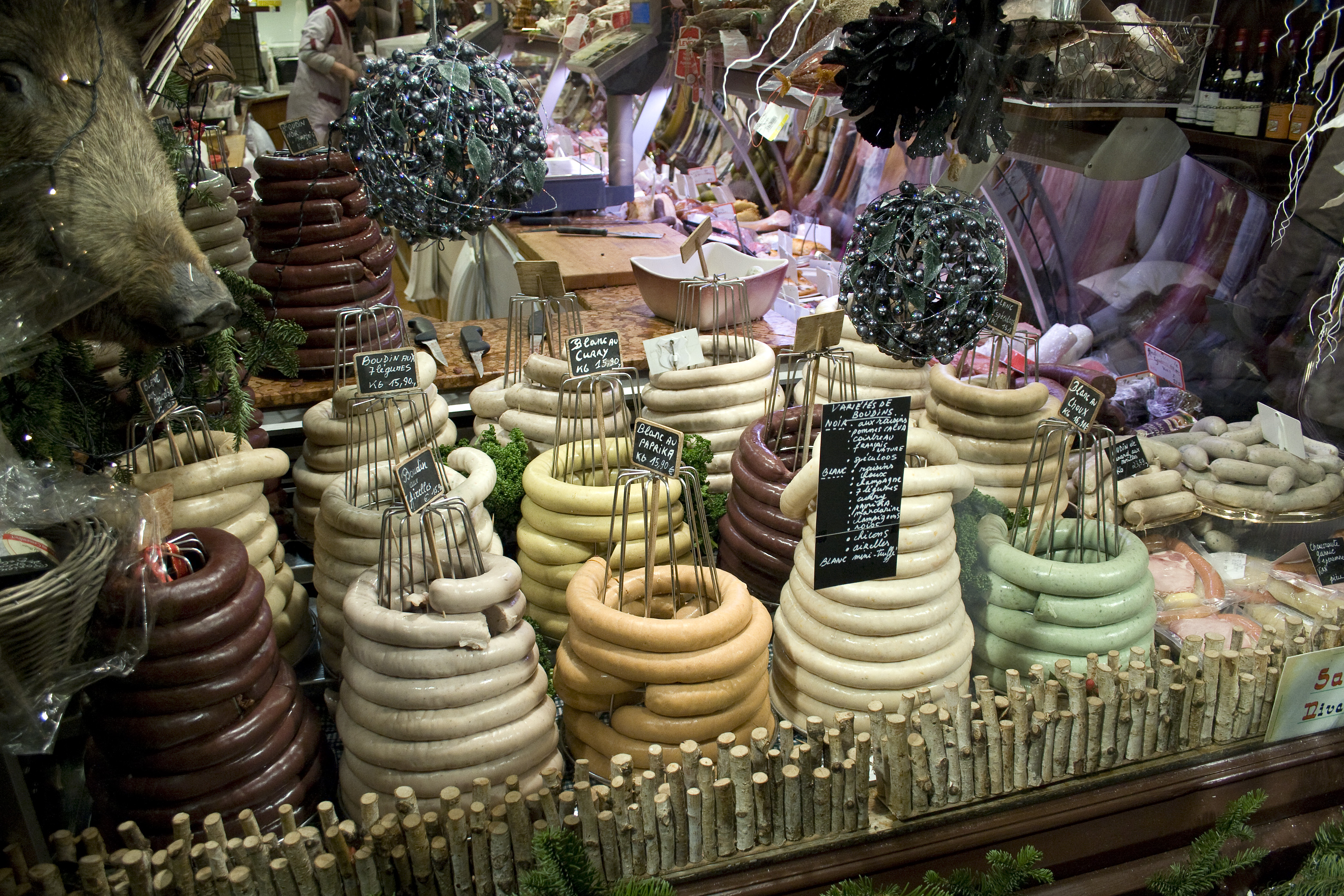
Boudins blancs at a Christmas market in Brussels

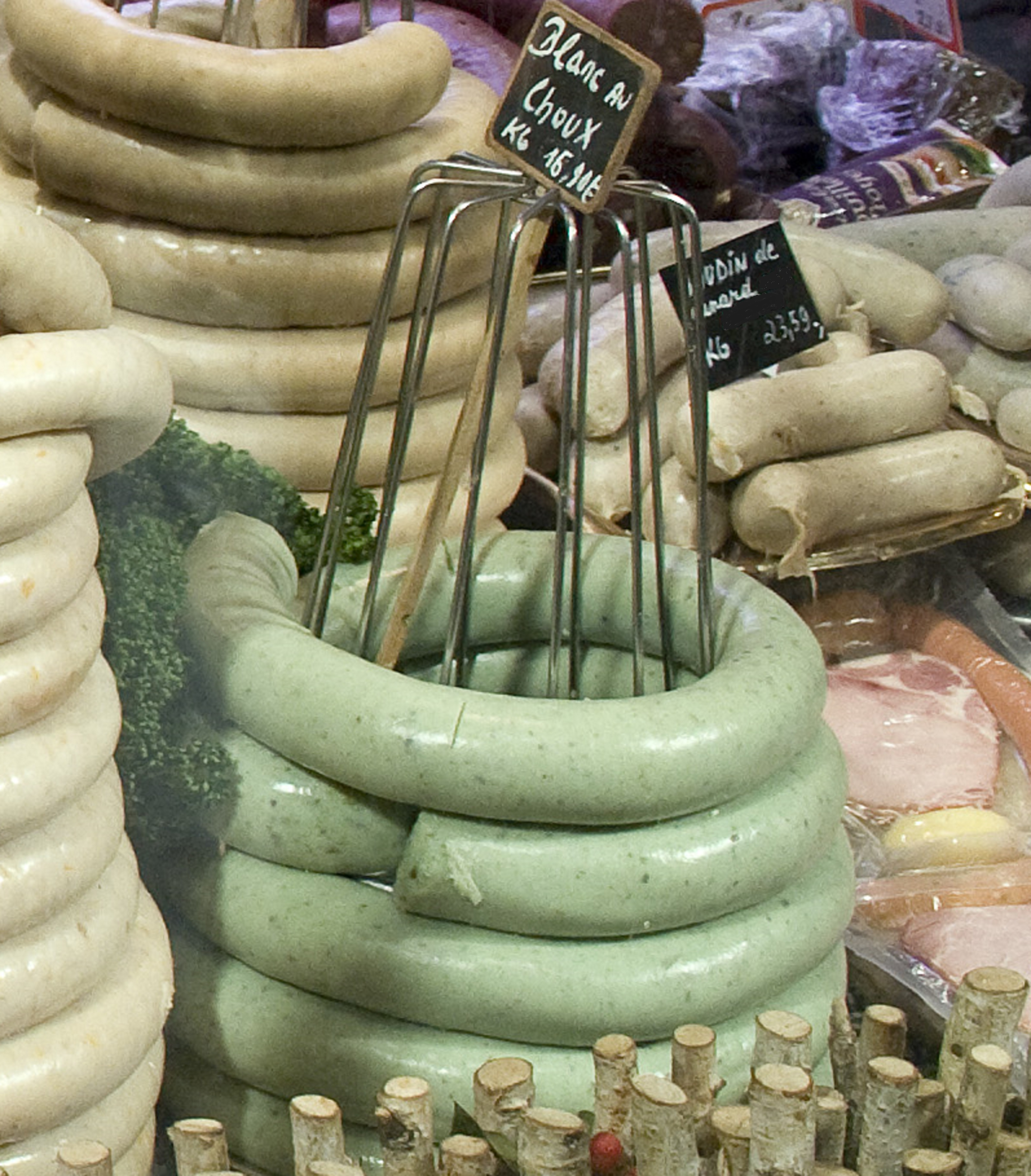
Boudins verts and blancs

== In the United States ==
The journals of the Lewis and Clark Expedition include an early record of boudin blanc in the Louisiana Territory during an encounter with French fur trapper Toussaint Charbonneau on May 9, 1805, who prepared it using buffalo intestine, meat, and kidney suet, boiled the links, and fried them in bear grease.

The term boudin in the Acadiana region of Louisiana is commonly understood to refer only to boudin blanc, and specifically to the regional combination of rice, pork, and seasonings originally made at rural communal hog butcherings since the 18th century. Also popular is seafood boudin, consisting of crawfish or crab, shrimp, and rice.

Cajun boudin is available most readily in the Acadiana region of southern Louisiana, though it may be found nearly anywhere in "Cajun Country" extending along the coast of the Gulf of Mexico from eastern Texas to western Mississippi. Several Louisiana towns and cities stake claims based on their boudin; Scott, Louisiana, was named "Boudin Capital of the World" in 2012, while Jennings was named "Boudin Capital of the Universe" and former "Boudin Capital of the World" Broussard redesignated itself the "Intergalactic Boudin Capital of Positive Infinity".

There are numerous meat markets and Cajun stores devoted to the speciality, though boudin is also sold from many convenience and grocery stores in other towns and areas along Louisiana's portion of Interstate 10, referred to by the Southern Foodways Alliance and some local tourism bureaus as the Southern Boudin Trail. Since Cajun boudin freezes well, it can be shipped outside the region if made and packaged in a federally approved facility.

Boudin noir is available in Illinois in the Iroquois County towns of Papineau and Beaverville, with their Quebecois heritage. The dish is the featured cuisine at the annual Beaverville Founder's Day, held the second weekend of September. People travel from hundreds of miles to partake of the boudin.

== "Le Boudin" ==
Boudin gave rise to "Le Boudin", the official march of the French Foreign Legion. "Blood sausage" is a colloquial reference to the gear (rolled up in a red blanket) that used to top the backpacks of Legionnaires. The song makes repeated reference to the fact that the Belgians do not get any "blood sausage", since the king of the Belgians at one time forbade his subjects from joining the Legion (the verse says "ce sont des tireurs au cul").

== See also ==
- Black pudding
- Blood sausage
- White pudding
