= Serge Andolenko =

French military officer (born 1907)

Serge Andolenko
- Born: 26 June 1907; Volotchysk (Ukraine)
- Died: 27 August 1973 (aged 66) France
- Branch: French Army; French Foreign Legion
- Service years: 1924–1963
- Rank: Général de brigade
- Commands: 5th Infantry Battalion; 5th Foreign Infantry Regiment; Assistant Inspector of the Technical Inspection of the Foreign Legion
- Conflicts: Moroccan Campaign; World War II; Algerian War
- Awards: Légion d'honneur
- Other work: Military Attaché of French mission to Vienna (1961–1963)

Serge Andolenko (26 June 1907 – 27 August 1973) was a French military officer of Ukrainian origin who became brigade général of the French Army.

Born in Volochysk in 1907 in what then the Russian Empire, he was the only son, of an aristocratic family of military traditions (Cossacks). His father, Paul, a tsarist officer, was a magistrate and dragoon captain in the Imperial Russian Army who died in 1931 in one of Stalin's first purges.

== Military career ==
Admitted into Saint-Cyr in 1924 ("Rif promotion"), he served with prince Dimitri Amilakvari. He was assigned to the French Foreign Legion at the end of his scholarity. In 1926, at 19, he became a sub-lieutenant in the 1st Foreign Regiment (1^{er} RE) at Sidi Bel Abbès, Algeria. He participated in campaigns in Morocco and the French Levant and was naturalized as a French citizen in May 1928. He then served in the 1st Foreign Regiment (1^{er} RE), 3rd Foreign Infantry Regiment (3^{e} REI), 4th Foreign Regiment (4^{e} RE), 5th Foreign Infantry Regiment (5^{e} REI), the 6th Foreign Infantry Regiment (6^{e} REI) and the Inspection of the Foreign Legion (1959-1960).

During the Second World War, he was chief of the 2nd bureau (Intelligence) of the 3rd Algerian Infantry Division under the orders of General Joseph de Goislard de Monsabert. At this occasion during the Italian campaign, he made sure of liaison between the 3rd Algerian Infantry Division and the 4th Mountain Moroccan Division. Following the disembarkation in Provence, he took part in the liberation of Marseille. Due to his functions, he assured the liaison coordination between various units of the 3rd Algerian Infantry Division/ Resistance/ U.S. American units/ Liberation of Grenoble/ Liberation of Strasbourg). He finished the conflict with the 3rd Algerian Infantry Division at Stuttgart.

Following the war, he commanded the 5th Infantry Battalion in Germany.

He commanded the 5th Foreign Infantry Regiment 5^{e} REI during the Algerian War.

Following that command, he was designated as Inspector-adjoint of the Foreign Legion, then integrated the CHEM (French: Centre des hautes études militaires).

Designated Military Attaché to Vienna (1961-1963), he was promoted to Général de Brigade. He was admitted to the second section of the officer corps of generals in 1963.

A passionate historian, he was renowned for several publications on the French Army and the Imperial Russian Army. He created an entire hall for the Russian Army of the 1st World War in the Musée des Invalides.

He died in France on 27 August 1973.

== Literature ==
He wrote several publications, notably on military history, out of which certain were translated to several languages:

- La filiation des bataillons de Légion étrangère, 1935 - (The Filiation of French Foreign Legion Battalions).
- Visite aux salles d'honneur et au musée du Souvenir de la Légion, 1938 - (Visit to the Halls of Honor and the Museum of Memory of the Legion).
- Les drapeaux de la Grande Guerre, 1945 - (The Flags of the Great War).
- Aperçus sur la guerre 1914-1918 sur le front Russe, 1945 - ( Aspects of the 1914-1918 War on the Russian Front).
- Historique du 5^{e} étranger d'infanterie, 1957 - (History of the 5th Foreign Infantry Regiment).
- Recueil d'historiques de l'infanterie française, 1949 (re-edited in 1969) - (Historical overview of the French Infantry).
- Histoire de l'armée russe, 1952 (re-edited in 1967) - (History of the Russian Army).
- Recueil d'historiques de l'arme blindée et de la cavalerie, 1968 - (Historical Overview of the Armored Corps and the Cavalry).
- Aigles de Napoléon contre drapeaux du Tsar, 1969 - (Napoleon's Eagles against the Flags of the Tsar).
- Histoire du Régiment Préobrajenski (edited in Russian in 2010) - (History of the Préobrajenski Regiment) - ( Régiment Préobrajenski (French: Régiment Préobrajensky))
- Généralissime Souvorov (edited in 2015) - (Generalissimo Souvorov).

== Distinctions ==
- Commander of the Légion d'honneur
- Commander of the National Order of Merit (France)
- Croix de guerre 1939-1945 (5 citations)
- Croix de guerre des théâtres d'opérations extérieures (1 citation)
- Croix de la Valeur Militaire (3 citations)
- Palmes académiques
- Commander of the Nicham Iftikar (Tunisia)
- Commander of the Order of Ouissam Alaouite (Morocco)
- Commander of the Ordre pour le Mérite (Austria)
- Bronze Star Medal (U.S.)

Titled of nine citations out of which five at the orders of the armed forces.
