= 192.com =

British directory service

192.com Ltd.
- Type: Private limited company
- Industry: Directory
- Genre: Directory
- Predecessor: iCD publishing
- Founded: London (1997)
- Founder: Alastair Crawford
- Fate: Operating
- Headquarters: London, England, UK
- Area served: United Kingdom
- Key people: Managing Director - Keith Marsden; Bryan Foley - Financial Director; Dominic Blackburn - Product Director.
- Products: People search, Business directory, Property Prices, Maps
- Net income: 471787
- Owner: Alastair Crawford, majority shareholder & other investors
- Number of employees: 35
- Website: www.192.com

192.com is a British company that publishes an online directory as well as information contained within the public domain for the United Kingdom, based in London, England.

The company provides online directory enquiries and competes with BT, Google Local, Yelp and the Yell Group (the holding company now known as hibu, as of 2012) for the directory enquiry market. It is the market leader DQ for finding people.

192.com contains approximately 700 million residential and business records. Of these records, 200 million come from the 2002-2017 edited Electoral Rolls, though some of these are duplicate records. 28 million people were on the edited Electoral Roll in 2015. 192.com's other records come from Companies House Director Reports, the Land Registry, and Births Deaths and Marriages Data for England and Wales. 192.com also publishes a directory of UK businesses, providing company credit reports, financial statements, employee numbers, current and previous directors, web mentions and county court judgements. Registered users can also add details to any business listings using User Generated Content of non-limited companies in addition to limited companies.

== History ==
Founded in 1997 by Alastair Crawford, 192.com Limited evolved from a CD-ROM product called UK Info Disk, the best selling non-game CD-ROM product of its time. 192.com publishes the Edited Electoral Roll in electronic media; previously the roll had been available for consultation only in public libraries and town halls. The company offered an alternative to British Telecom's previous monopoly of telephone directory enquiries. There were a number of lawsuits related to this online challenge.

During the dotcom bubble in 2001 icd publishing was valued at £100 million.

In February 2011 icd publishing Ltd split in half; the two units were named 192.com Ltd and 192business Ltd. On 1 March 2012, half of the company 192business Ltd was sold to Experian Plc for an undisclosed sum, though the gross value of the assets was £9 million.

== Products ==
In 2010, 192.com Limited launched i192, an app for iPhones supplying free directory enquiries and 192.com's business and residential listings for mobile web users. However, some users found the app difficult to use.

In 2012, the company released a new product, 'See Who's Looking for You'.

In 2013, the company released a new product, 'Background Reports', which includes edited electoral roll information, any county court judgements, mortality data, land registry details and an insolvency report.

== Reunions ==
The company has helped reunite missing family and friends - for example, the Salvation Army use 192.com to reunite an estimated 3,000 families each year. However, in September 2011, 192.com's competitor Tracesmart won the Salvation Army account. In 2010 it featured in the BBC 1 series Trackers as a tool for tracing lost family and forgotten financial assets.

== Customer concerns ==
The Review Centre has over 140 reviews with an average rating of one star. The main complaint is lack of transparency as to what data is available for specific records. Other complaints include paid credits being used during searches that would be free if not logged in, poor customer service and credits expiring within 30 days if not used.

== Privacy concerns ==
Some people find the depth of detail an invasion of privacy, with information being seen using search engines. These have the option of deleting their details. There is an opt-out on the electoral roll registration papers, or on 192.com's website by filling out a 'C01' form which can be downloaded and sent online. 192.com is licensed and regulated by the Data Protection Act 2018.

== Literature ==
192.com is mentioned in Dick Francis's novel Shattered where the protagonist uses 192.com to trace a missing person.

192.com is mentioned in Robert Galbraith’s novel The Ink Black Heart where the website is used several times to check addresses of facilities.
