= 5th Foreign Infantry Regiment =

5th Foreign Regiment 5^{e} Régiment Étranger
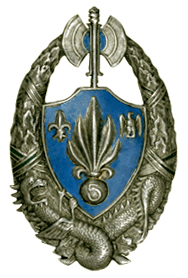
- Regimental insignia of 5^{e} REI
- Country: France
- Branch: French Army
- Type: Infantry
- Garrison/HQ: Mayotte
- Nickname: Régiment du Tonkin
- Mottos: Le plus chic, le plus beau, le plus chouette (Fr); The most chic, the most beautiful, the nicest (Eng)
- Colors: Green & Red
- March: Le front haut et l'âme fière (Fr); Forehead up high and with a proud soul (Eng)
- Engagements: World War II; Indochina War; Algerian War
- Battle honours: Camarón 1863; Sơn Tây 1883; Bac-Ninh 1884; Tuyên Quang 1885; Lạng Sơn 1885; Indochina 1945-1954; Algeria 1952-1962

Insignia
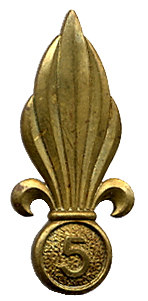
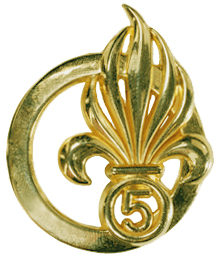
- Insignia of the 5th Foreign Infantry Regiment
- Abbreviation: 5th REI

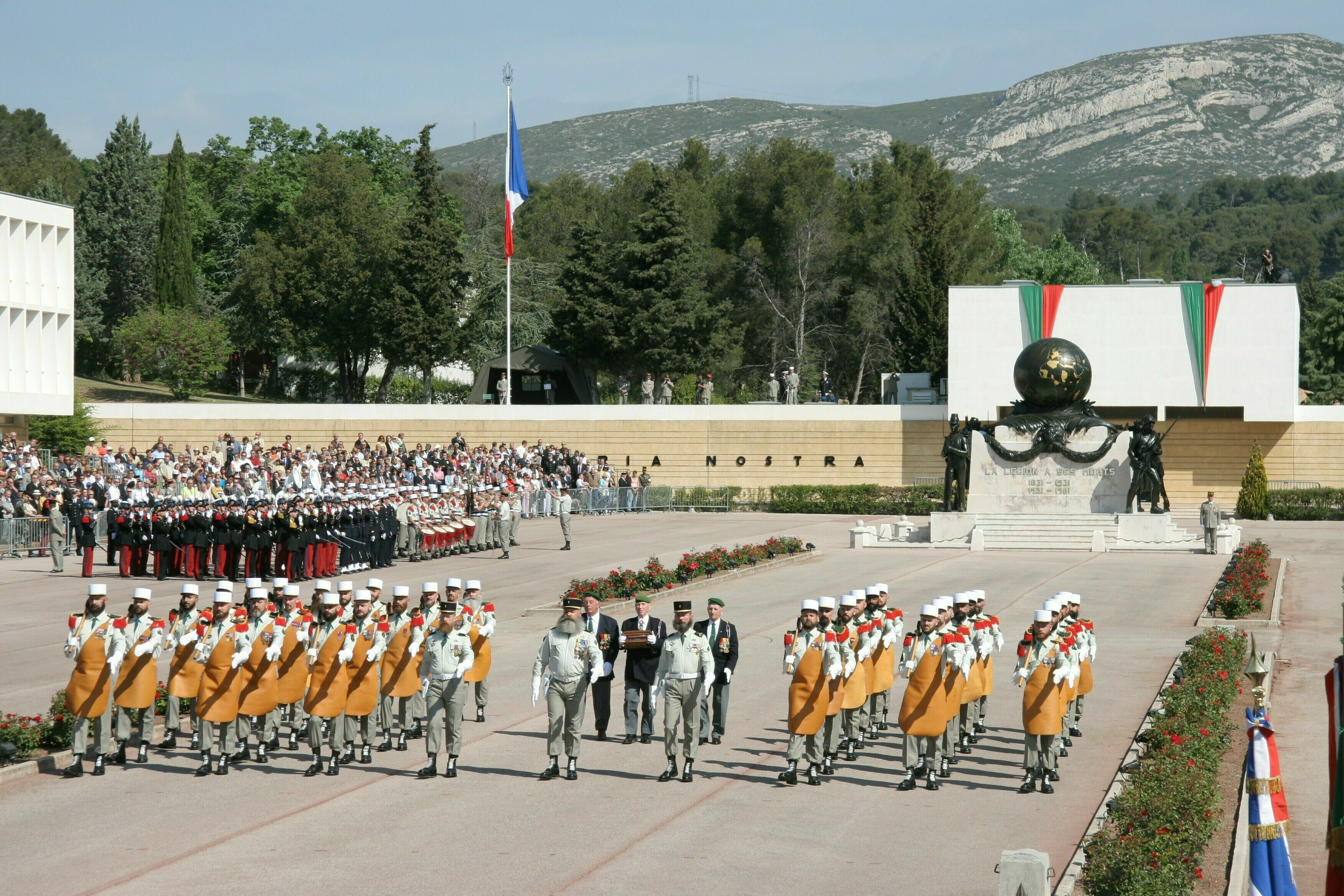
Each year, the Foreign Legion commemorates and celebrates the Battle of Camarón in its headquarters in Aubagne and the Bastille Day military parade in Paris; featuring the Pionniers leading and opening the way.

The 5th Foreign Regiment (abbr. 5th RE, French: 5^{e} Régiment Étranger), nicknamed the "Regiment of Tonkin" (French: "Régiment du Tonkin"), is a regiment of the Foreign Legion of the French Army created under the Third Republic. The history of this regiment is marked by its participation in World War II, the Indochina War and the Algerian War. The regiment is based in Mayotte since 2024.

== Creation and different designations ==
- September 1, 1930 : Creation of the 5th Foreign Infantry Regiment (abbr. 5th REI) from the Demi-Brigade of the Foreign Legion.
- July 1, 1945 : Dissolved for the first time. Its units are regrouped at the corps of the Marching Battalion of the 5th REI (French: bataillon de marche du 5^{e} REI).
- November 1, 1949 : The regiment was reconstructed from elements of the 6th REI and the 4th REI.
- October 1, 1963 : The regiment became the 5th Mixed Pacific Regiment (French: 5^{e} régiment mixte du Pacifique).
- July 1, 1984 : Designated as 5th Foreign Regiment (French: 5^{e} régiment étranger).
- June 30, 2000 : During the reorganization of the French Army, the 5th Foreign Regiment was dissolved. The regimental colours were entered into the French Foreign Legion Museum.
- June 1, 2024 : The 5^{e} régiment étranger is recreated from the Détachement de Légion étrangère de Mayotte.

== History ==
=== Indochina ===
==== Prior to the Second World War ====
Because of the decrease in army troop numbers during World War I, the necessity of reinforcement in Tonkin was highlighted and four battalions of the Foreign Legion were routed to the Far East and formed the 5th Foreign Infantry Regiment.

Partly made up of existing units that had been station in Tonkin since 1883, the regiment was created on July 17, 1930, and was put into effect on September 1, 1930.

The regiment was established from the 1st, 7th and 9th Battalions of the 1st Foreign Infantry Regiment that had been previously deployed to Indochina from 1920 to 1927. Garrison duty in French Indochina proved to be a fairly peaceful assignment for the legionnaires until the outbreak of World War II with the notable exception of the Yên Bái mutiny in 1930.

Lacking both human and material resources, the regiment was maintained provisionally under the previous operation of its field corps as part of the ephemeral Demi-Brigade of the Foreign Legion (French: demi-brigade de Légion étrangère, DBLE) issued from the 1st Foreign Regiment.

The regiment was not fully formed until April 1, 1931. Colonel Debas, regimental commander of the DBLE, was designated as the head of corps.

The formation in 1931 was as follows:

- Headquarters staff at Vietri
  - The regimental band and the transmission section at Tong
- 1st Battalion at Tong
- 2nd Battalion, at Dap Cau
  - a section at Sept Pagodes
  - a detachment at Phu Lang Thuong
- 3rd Battalion
  - 2nd company at Tuyen Quang
  - 9th company at Yen Bay (where the mutiny of the same name took place)
  - 10th company of the 3rd battalion at Vietri
- 4th Battalion at Vietri
- Special section at Ha Giang

The regimental colours were received on May 7, 1932, at Son Tay. On September 7, 1932, the 4th Battalion was dissolved. With the regiment down to only three battalions, the units were regrouped in Hanoi.

In 1936, General Buhrer considered the expansion of the regiment's field of action. The command envisaged the possibility of exterior actions and provided two supply routes. This allowed for the movement of strategic motorized vehicles depending on the needs of the situation. The first supply route linked Hai Phong to Phong Saly and the second linked Tonkin to the south of Indochina.

The 5th Foreign Infantry Regiment rotated its battalions to execute major construction works, one of which was the strategic route between Campha and Tien Yen. The legionnaires were in charge of the supervision of local inhabitants, but also contributed to the construction of pasture centres in Mont Bavi and Khang Kay (Laos), as well as the expansion of those in Chapa and Tam Dau.

=== World War II ===
- 1940 : While the Vichy government authorized the Japanese Army to pass through Indochina, the latter invaded Tonkin. The 2nd Battalion fought at Lang Son.
- 1941 : During the Franco-Thai War, the 3rd Battalion fought in Cambodia, near Battambang and the 1st Battalion near Pailin.
- 1945 : The regiment formed part of the defense against the Japanese Army.

In 1939, the command post was garrisoned at Vietri. The 1st Battalion was garrisoned at Tong, the 2nd battalion and the motorized detachment at Dap Cau, the 3rd Battalion at Tuyên Quang. In September, the declaration of war in Europe did not provoke any particular agitations. Nevertheless, anticipated dispositions in relation to general mobilization were put into action.

In 1940, the command post of the regiment, the 1st and 3rd Battalions moved to Cambodia. The 2nd Battalion assured a part of the garrison of Lang Son and Dap Cay, while the motorized detachment joined Cao Bang. Japanese forces eventually mounted the attack on Lang Son in 1940. On September 22, the 2nd Battalion was attacked by elements of the Japanese Army as they withdrew from China across the Tonkin border. Accordingly, the 2nd battalion, in garrison at Fort Brière de l'Isle, mounted defensive measures under the orders of Commandant Marcelin. A cease fire was then agreed.

The 2nd battalion participated with the DML to the pursuit of contingents that were terrorizing the populations. The effort was carried through until January 15, 1941. Accordingly, the fanion of the 2nd battalion was decorated with the Imperial Order of the Dragon of Annam. In 1941, the command post of the regiment went back to Việt Tri. The 1st battalion I/5^{e} REI was at Tuyên Quang, the II/5^{e} REI was at Tong, the III/5^{e} REI at Sept Pagodes and the motorized detachment at Lang Son.

Accordingly, territorial struggles followed with attacks along the Mekong and the western-frontier of Cambodia. The Siamese troops, very well armed, launched their efforts on January 16, 1941. A violent combat opposed the legionnaires at two battalions supported by tanks and aviation. In front the defensive resistance of the Régiment du Tonkin, the aggressors unfolded. The 3rd battalion endured over twenty killed and a dozen wounded. The armistice was signed end of January and accordingly territories were attached to Cambodia and Laos.

In 1945, the 5^{e} REI held the garrisons of Viét Tri, Tong, Tien Kien, Lang Son and Hanoï, with other elements in the surrounding garrisons. The Japanese considerably reinforced within liaison means on the ensemble of the Indochinese territories, were equipped with modern arms. In 24 hours, they rendered themselves masters in their element of all the garrisons. At Ha Giang, Yen Bay, and Cao Bang, French forces disappeared. Certain elements were successful in joining the forces that were marching towards the frontier of China. The 9th company which was designated to guard the command post succeeded in filtering through. The last elements of the 5^{e} REI reached the frontier of China. They joined Tsao Pa on May 2 after having hiked 1500 km in 93 days. On place, they benefited of the benevolence of général Pechkoff, former Legion officer and representative of France at Tchong King.

Marching battalion of the 5^{e} REI, BM 5

On July 1, 1945, the regiment was dissolved. The remainder of the force were regrouped in a marching battalion BM 5, which the units of traditions kept the fanions of their battalion. In February 1946, the legionnaires were authorized to cross the Tonkin frontier, to push the Viet Minh, their new adversary, approaching Son La. They were stopped by the accords of Hanoi. Linked to the exterior world only by radio and parachuting, they succeeded in June to reach the province of Sam Neua, which they protected against looters. On November 1, 1946, the BM 5 was dissolved. On December 12, 1946, the remainder embarked on the Sontay in direction to Algeria and the maison mère of Sidi bel-Abbès.

=== Indochina War ===
At the moment were the war in Indochina was developing, the 5^{e} REI was set back on foot in Tonkin on November 1, 1949, from the V/4th Foreign Infantry Regiment and effectifs from Sidi bel-Abbès. On April 12, 1950, at Haiphong, lieutenant-colonel François Binoche received the regimental colors from général Alessandri, commander-in-chief of Tonkin. The new mission of the 5^{e} REI was to defend the frontier north-east of Tonkin, and principally the axe route which linked the Mon Caï sector to the Delta.

Trials of small holding posts were exercised. On November 26, 1949, the 1st battalion was found engaged in combat in the RC6, where the post of Cho Bo and Hoa Binh were menaced and the post of Suyut was encircled. The legionnaires replied back on February 22, 1950, through an operation.

The 2nd battalion, was dispersed in small detachments on the principal posts of Tien Yen, Dam Ha, Ha Coi et Mon Caï. The unit along with the 3rd Foreign Infantry Regiment 3^{e} REI participated to the disarmament of various contingents passing into Indochina. On April 16, 1950, an operation was launched, to which the 1st battalion participated with. This operation was followed by another, south of Hanoi. The Viet-minh pressure accentuated on the frontier with China. Following the attack of May 25, 1950, again Dong Khe, command sent the 2nd battalion to reinforce the status mission dispositif.

On September 16, rebels launch an offense in Cao Bang which fell. The posts of Na Cham and Dong Dand were evacuated under the protection of the battalion in rear-guard. The unit collected the debris of colonnes Charton and Lepage as well as the echeloned garrisons along the pressure axes of the Viet-minh (Battle of Route Coloniale 4).

The 1st battalion mounted the assault from Mon Caï side and retook position at Tan mai on October 20, 1950. Ten days later, the unit reoccupied Dinh Lap and saved la bande côtière. Facing the length of the disaster, the triumph was modest.

At the end of 1950, the regiment wa echeloned on the RC 18 and the frontier zone in the region of Mon Caï. In December, the GM 6 was created from elements of the regimental command company. The unit made way to meet the 174 Viet-Minh regiment which was marching on Dhin Lap. The harassment was continuous all along the column. The 2nd battalion endured 50 killed and 50 wounded. The last couple of days of this dreadful month were marked by the clearing operation of Binh Lieu led by the 1st battalion, which after having owed in front of the important means of the adversary, managed to recuperate the wounded and reoccupied the post for a couple of hours finding only three killed and two wounded.

At his arrival to Indochina, général Jean de Lattre de Tassigny decided to create a fortification belt around the Delta. Since the beginning of 1951, the 2nd battalion committed to the task and was joined by the 1st battalion already in works in the region of Vinh Yen and Vietri. Until the month of November, the life of the pioneers (French: Les Pionniers) followed, opening of routes, ambushes, harassment and regulated attacks.

The 3rd battalion was integrated into GM 4 within the cadre of an operation. The 1st battalion distinguished savoire faire during two other operations. Combats around the river developed. The III/5^{e} REI, implanted in the sector was attacked in vain. The end of the year 1951 witnessed the end combats around the river where the Viet-Minh was panting. Nevertheless, the 304th division controlled the RC6 and hoped to make Hoa Binh a renewed version of Cao Bang.

The battle commenced in the night of January 7 and 8 1952 and the unfolding of Hoa Binh started on February 23, 1952. The I/5^{e} REI joined Xuon may and the lines of cemented posts. The rebels were masters of the mountainous regions where they rested camps, armouries and depots. The troops of Tonkin were reduced to garrison in the Delta. The cement belt was not enough to prevent infiltrations. The "pourrissement" of the Delta developed. This first "reduction" would be, the fief of the Régiment du Tonkin until the end.

The 2nd battalion participated to the clearing of the sector of Phat Diem then to various operations. The 3rd battalion was signed at Na Sam in 1952. The legionnaires participated to six different operations. The war changed face. The means put in place by the adversary increased exponentially. The more the Viet-Minh gained grounds, the more the regiment had to multiply to extinguish the fires. The unit remained until April 6, 1953, organizing continuously positions, constructing and building roads to unnerve the adversary, and enduring while repelling ongoing increasing attacks.

The 4th battalion constituted in big part of Vietnamese became the 75th Vietnamese Battalion. The month of July 1953 sees the GM 5, with the 2nd battalion, participating to the welcoming of paratroopers which illustrated themselves during an operation. In the Delta, operation followed in September 1953, then October 15 in the region of Phu Nho Quan and the sector of Dong Qui Thon as well as Trai Lai Vi.

In March 1954, the 5^{E} REI was represented at Dien Bien Phu, by the 2nd Mixed Heavy Mortar Company 2^{e} CMML and by 80 volunteer legionnaires to be parachuted «pour l’Honneur».

During this time, the 1st battalion was transported on December 30, 1953, to Cochinchine, then Laos. Around Seno, the battalion led until May 12, 1954, a couter-guerilla warfare. On March 22 and March 23, the region of Ban Seng Phon was the theatre of an intense packed battle where the battalion endured the loss of 23 killed, 23 disappeared and 125 wounded. The intervention of the third battalion of the 1st Moroccan Tirailleurs Regiment III/1^{e} RTM saved the battalion, in front of an adversary ten times in number and armament.

The regiment regrouped on May 12, 1954, while the retrenched camp of Dien Bien Phu was falling. On the other hand, on April 16, 1954, the GM 5, composed of the 2nd and 3rd battalion of the 5^{e} REI, endured heavy losses against a battalion at Thai Binh. Following, the Régiment du Tonkin applied the accords of the armistice and handed Hanoi to the Viet-Minh.

On October 10, 1954, the last element crossed the bridge. The regiment regrouped then in Annam where the unit remained for 7 months. The regiment was dedicated to peaceful works, constructing of camps and routes. In September 1955, the 5th Foreign Infantry Regiment celebrated the 25th anniversary of creation.

On January 14, 1956, the 1st and 3rd battalion embarked on the MS Pasteur. The 2nd battalion left last the terrains of Indochina on March 12, 1956. Elements of the Régiment du Tonkin registered 137 officers, sous-officiers and legionnaires killed in action until the cease-fire.

The regimental colors are decorated with 3 citations at the orders of the armed forces and the Fourragere with colors of the croix de guerre des TOE. The fanions of the battalions totalled 6 citations at the orders of the armed forces and 4 at the orders of the armed corps.

=== Algerian War ===
The regiment tackled the ground first on February 9, 1956. Accordingly, the 1st and 3rd battalion were directed towards Oranie.

On March 20, 1956, the regimental commander, a couple of officers from headquarter staff and Captain Cozette, fall in an ambush. Captain Cozette was killed during the pursuit of the rebels which on April 6, the 3rd battalion intercepted following an unfolding. Similarly, the 1st battalion intercepted the same company of rebels.

During this period, the regimental commander assumed command of the under sector of Turenne in the operational zone of Tlemcen. Accordingly, the 5^{e} REI became the intervention group with particular missions.

During 1956, the summary for the regiment revolved around the apprehension of 439 arms. Losses for the regiment were resumed at 10% of effectifs placed out of combat.

During 1957, the regiment du Tonkin illustrated capability in a couple of grands combats, in particular on January 15, the 26 and February 15. Other combats followed on April 20, June 13 and September 13.

Four days later, the new regimental colors arrived to the regiment. Within the folds were inscribed "Indochine 1945-1946, 1949-1954". For the year 1957, the summary for the regiment revolved around the apprehension of 492 arms.

The 5th foreign was reduced to two battalions. The first took the place of the second, in the under sector of Turenne. At the beginning of 1958, the 3rd battalion recently occupied the posts of the 245th infantry battalion. The regiment was accordingly dispersed. In the meantime, and during an operation on March 25, 1958, adjudant-chef Mix fell to the adversary while combat engaging a company of rebels. Three days later, the regiment placed out of combat 77 adversaries. On the eve of May 13, 1958, the régiment du Tonkin total counted the apprehension of 1000 arms.

At the beginning of the month, the 1st battalion endured the loss of an officer, as well three sous-officiers and four legionnaires.

On October 1, 1958, the regiment was implanted under the orders of the 10th Parachute Division 10^{e} DP of général Gilles. The year summary revolved around the apprehension of 210 arms.

On February 4, 1959, the regiment made way to Ouarsenis central. The 5th Foreign Infantry Regiment had for objective the expulsion of the rebels from the zones. During an operation on March 5, Adjutant-Chief Vasko fell to the adversary. On May 19, during another operation which marked the decline of rebels, Lieutenant Ivanoff fell to the adversary while mounting an assault.

On June 18, the regiment left Ouarsenis. On July 21, the regiment made mouvement in direction of Kabylie to take part in several operations. Following a short movement towards Algiers, the year of 1960 ran through October in the presqu’île de Collo.

In October 1960, the 5^{e} REI left the presqu’île de Collo for Aures. On the 4, the regiment participated to an operation under the orders of colonel Langlois. The groupment formed by the 5^{e} REI, the 3rd Foreign Infantry Regiment 3^{e} REI and the 1st Foreign Cavalry Regiment 1^{e} REC, worked in the region of Tougour and Ras Selb.

On December 4, 1960, the regiment replaced the 13th Demi-Brigade of Foreign Legion 13^{e} DBLE at Bou Hamama, in the Constantinois, then the 3^{e} REI in Kenchala. Missions of relief were conducted by the regiment until February 14, 1961, date in which the regiment was found in the rear base. From February 28 to March 3, 1961, the regiment was in Oran for operations of maintaining order in urban lieu.

The régiment du Tonkin became a saharian unit and came back to the region of Geryville. With a rare adversary presence, the bâtisseur function of the regiment was put in place. In May 1961, a new operational phase commenced along the barrage to refix, protecting the electro-mechanical, clear the barbed wire networks from the snow, and regulate instances of fire. Legionnaires became familiar with these types of environments. At Christmas, the regiment made way north along with the frontier of Morocco. From that period, the regiment only ensured a mission of surveillance.

On April 4, 1962, the 5^{e} REI left the region of Tlemcen. On June 30, 1962, the independence of Algeria was proclaimed. On July 1, the 1st company was made dormant and followed the 3rd company. In October, the regiment relieved the 2nd Foreign Infantry Regiment 2^{e} REI at Ain Sefra. Finally, in March 1963, the 5^{e} REI was transformed into a legion engineer unit (French: unité de Génie Légion) and prepared to depart to Polynesia.

End of 1959, the «Régiment du Tonkin» placed 2033 elements out of combat and apprehended 1401 arms.

=== Polynesia ===
Garrisons : Arue, Moruroa, Hao...

5th Mixed Regiment of the Pacific, 5^{e} RMP (1964–1983)

As of March 1963 and in prevision of a new organization of the 5th Foreign Infantry Regiment 5^{e} REI on the type of type "Génie-Légion" (Legion Engineer), various specialized courses took place in metropolis for the concerned personnel in the Engineer units. A precursor element was sent to Tahiti initially, and the departures of the concerned units succeeded each other until the end of the year. Reduced considerably, on November 30, 1962, the 5th Foreign Infantry Regiment 5^{e} REI ceased to exist administratively.

Beforehand, since October 1, the 5th Mixed Regiment of the Pacific 5^{e} RMP was created at Arzew under the command of colonel Nouguès. The latter readopted the traditions of the Regiment of Tonkin. On December 7, 1963, the regimental colors disembarked from Landing Ship, Tank (LST) Cheliff at the port of Papeete. The regiment received the colour guard two days later at camp Arue. In light of preparing the regiment to its various new missions, command proceeded with numerous organizations.

During the arrival of the regiment at camp Arue on December 9, 1963, the regiment conserved three battalions. Two were assigned to general works, they both merged in April 1964, and the last one was assigned to services. On April 30, 1964, in preparation for the celebration of Camaron, the 5^{e} RMP received a new insignia which recalled the original place of garrison, its belonging to the Legion engineer function, and in the implantation in Polynesia. On June 27, the companies received their respective fanion, with their reverse commemorating a company of the former 5th Foreign Infantry Regiment 5^{e} REI.

Between 1963 and 1964, the 5^{e} RMP built the routes of Tefaana and "maître ouvrier Launay" in the valley of Ahonu, launched the floating bridge of Fare Ute, relieved river dikes and fought fires in the mountain of Fare Rau Ape on the island of Tahiti. On January 15, 1965, the regiment organized by suppressing battalions. The command post of the regiment, the rear base, an equipment company, the 1st support company and the 2nd works company remained on Tahiti. The 2nd support company, the 1st works company with less than 2 sections was found on the atoll of Moruroa with the 3rd support company moving on Hao.

Between 1965 and 1968, the regiment was incorporated at the corps of the directorate of engineering and material works. Placed under the orders of an engineer colonel, the regiment became an inter-arm unit. Personnel of materials arms and Troupes de marine were assigned to the regiment and 400 Polynesian civilians came forth to reinforce formation. Accordingly, a command and service company was created. In addition, all the personnel of the 5th Mixed Regiment of the Pacific 5^{e} RMP of Hao were regrouped in one element commanded by a superior officer of the regiment.

In August 1965, the peripheral post installations whose mission was to observe the weather, were protected by detachments of the 5th Mixed Regiment of the Pacific, 5^{e} RMP. These posts completed the record of climatic data which were indispensable for the execution of atmospheric nuclear trials practice at the époque on the site of Moruroa, and mainly data recorded by warplanes of French Naval Aviation and warships of the French Navy. On January 1, 1971, the merger of the three local builders, land, air and sea, led to a substitution at the corps of the 5th Mixed Regiment of the Pacific, at the directorate of engineering works, a new directorate which was designated as the directorate of infrastructure of the armies in Polynesia and the CEP.

The 5th Mixed Regiment of the Pacific conducted infrastructure installations works relative to land, naval and aerial armies. The regiment assured the support, direction, and repair of vehicles and various engineering materials of the French Army, French Navy, French Air Force and common services. The regiment operated the electrical grids of Papeete, Hao, Moruroa and the production installations of fresh water of Hao, Moruroa and Fangataufa. Finally, the regiment handled the ensemble of challenges linked with command, the equipment and support of the various peripheral posts.

Regrouped at Moruroa on January 5, 1976, the 5th Mixed Regiment of the Pacific 5^{e} RMP dived in total unknown autonomy along with French nuclear experimentations. The regiment assured the support and terrestrial protection of the inter-arm base and the CEP. On January 7, the regiment assumed functions on the atoll. The transfer was conducted under the responsibility of legion officer, lieutenant-colonel Chevalier. This decade corresponded to the expansion of the regiment. In February, the end of aerial experimentations led to the dissolution of the support company at Hao. The underground experiences which followed were the subject of important works. During these years, the regiment of Tonkin, while mobilized for the CEP, invested itself in profit of the territory. In 1977, the regiment suspended the steel park of the Gambier Islands and proceeded to the reflection of the route of Otepa. Renewing the mission of "Génie-Légion" (Legion Engineer), formerly placed in maneuver in Indochina, the regiment showcased to be polyvalent.

The 5^{e} RE : 5th Foreign Regiment (1983–2000)

On July 2, 1984, the 5th Mixed Regiment of the Pacific assumed the designation of 5th Foreign Regiment. As of 1986, the regiment served the populations and people of the Polynesian territory within the cadres of the accords of cooperation. The regiment intervened on the sites of Wallis and Futuna in 1986 and 1987, as well as in the Kingdom of Alo and Sigave in 1987 and 1988. The regiment executed backfilling for the openings of littoral defenses on Utufu, Malefo’ou, Walmalau, Kolopopp and Tees, restructured and automated the climatic observation posts of Tureia in 1986, and reconstructed the port dike of Hakahau and the Marquise islands in 1988. The regiment lent capabilities and savoir-faire for the placement in norms "ATR 42" of the various airstrips of Hiva Oa, in 1988 and 1989 and of Ruturu in 1990 and 1991. During this period, the regiment partook to the repair of routes, the extraction and crushing of aggregates, operations of maintaining order and the construction of hangars related to local cooperation. The 5th Foreign Regiment 5^{e} RE reinforced the bedrock of Whalf Halalo, opened a field at Lavegahau and Haatofo, leveled the ground for the emplacement of the hospital of Alo along with the incorporation of numerous sports terrains in each village, dynamited the passages of Vele, Alofi, Taua, Ono Tuatafa, Kolia, Tavai and Sigave, built an omnisports at Mangareva in 1993, an aerodrome at Takume in 1994 and 1995, the field of Ahe from 1995 to 1996, the aerodrome of Hikueru from 1996 to 1999 and participated the repair and enlargement of the principal route on the atoll of Takapoto in the summer of 1999. With the reprise of nuclear trials announced by the President of the Republic, the 5th Foreign Regiment 5^{e} RE prepared to intervene. End of June, the legionnaires welcomed a company of the 8th Marine Infantry Parachute Regiment 8^{e} RPIMa, inbound for reinforcement of the securitization of the airport at Faa’a.

Three boats of the Greenpeace organization were spotted in the South Pacific. Accordingly, the plan "Nautile" was put in place and sensible points were guarded. On July 6, the ships Rainbow Warrior (1957), Vega and Bifrost, approached territorial waters. The rapid interventions groups (GIR) embarked on tugboat Rari. Three days later, the rapid interventions groups (GIR) intercepted four zodiacs of the pacifist organization, navigating towards to the atoll. During fifteen days, the companies organized sweeps of the atoll in search of members of Greenpeace. In the month of August, the plan "Nautile" was reinforced. During the night of the 3, two groups of Zodiacs penetrated the lagoon. They were intercepted before attaining their objective and expelled by the authorities. The last tentative having failed, the media-environmentalist association was apprehended and immobilized on the atoll of Hao. They were authorized to sail back at sea in March 1996, at the end of campaign trials.

The end French nuclear experimentations led to the program disappearing of the regiment. Since March 1997, with the end of the last campaign trial, the regiment garrisoned at Hao within 900 km of Tahiti. The regiment retook the vocation "Génie" (Engineer). After being placed under the orders of the director general of the center of nuclear experimentation (DIRCEN), the regiment passed on August 1, 1998, under the subordination of superior French command of Polynesia (COM SUP) at the corps of the sovereign forces.

The regiment counted then 250 men spread in two companies. The command base and support company, (CCBS) strong with 105 men regrouped all the necessary services to the proper march of the regiment: headquarter staff, operations bureau, and human resources directorate, administrative and technical services. Certain functions made call for the participation of civilian enterprises under contract manufacturers. The works company (CT), the main spear of the regiment, strong with 145 men, was organized in four combat and works section, an equipment section where specific public works equipments were regrouped. The latter counted a barracks section and insured the maritime transboarding operations with its own respective naval transit section.

The 5th Foreign Regiment 5^{e} RE participated to the development of Polynesia and, by convention between State Defense and the Territory, the regiment contributed to many development programs on the territory. The field works type consisted to build airstrips to open up the most isolated atoll s. These field work types were designated as "field cooperation".

In addition, the 5th Foreign Regiment 5^{e} RE was able to intervene on behalf of the sovereign forces. This mission consisted of two wings: the participation to exercises, maneuvers and turning presence, organized by the COM.SUP and the intervention to aid local populations in case of natural calamity. Nevertheless, the end of nuclear trials and the restructuring of the armies marked the end of the service of the regiment. The foreign regiment's companies were placed in dormant phase one after the other, with the dissolution of the regiment programmed to take place in July 2000. On September 23, 2000, lieutenant-colonel Arnault, the last regimental commander, brought back the flag colors of the foreign regiment to the 1st Foreign Regiment, where the latter joined the illustrious legion predecessors in the crypt at the French Foreign Legion Museum at Aubagne, France.

While the sites of Moruroa and Fangataufa were presently returned to nature; there are military domains in existence whose accesses are strictly controlled. Turning units maintain on Moruroa a section of 25 men (generally, legionnaires) charged with guarding and monitoring the sites. Sections are relieved every couple of months. These sections also ensure the maintenance of telemetry installations which control the quality of the environment.

=== Mayotte ===
On June 1, 2024 the Foreign Legion Detachment in Mayotte became the 5th Foreign Regiment.

== Notable personalities having served in the regiment ==
- Captain Rage, commanding the passage company of the 5th Foreign Infantry Regiment 5^{e} REI, killed in action on April 1, 1945
- Hermann Eckstein (1903–1976), Compagnon de la Libération
- Henri Bénévène, Compagnon de la Libération
- Chef de bataillon Raoul Magrin-Vernerey - from 1933 to 1937
- Lieutenant Chenel - from 1941 to 1947, chief of the ghost detachment (French: détachement fantôme) (left the service as a general)
- Colonel Marcel Alessandri - regimental commander 1941, chief of the column éponyme in 1945 in Viet Nam – left the service as a general)
- Colonel Henri Dufour, commandant 3/5 - 1951-1952 - regimental commander of the 1st Foreign Parachute Regiment 1^{er} REP
- Colonel Serge Andolenko, officer at foreign status, regimental commander 1956-1958 (left the service as a general)

== Traditions ==
Celebrations of the 5^{e} RE

- On December 4, Saint Barbara is celebrated, the Patron Saint of all Engineer units
- The celebration of Camarón, on April 30, is the solemn celebration of the legionnaires
- Christmas is the solemn celebration of the "legionnaire family"

== Mottos ==
- 1st battalion of the 5th Foreign Infantry Regiment : Primus Inter Pares (a first among equals; the senior or representative member of a group)
- 3rd battalion of the 5th Foreign Infantry Regiment : Ne crains rien (worry about none)

=== Insignia ===
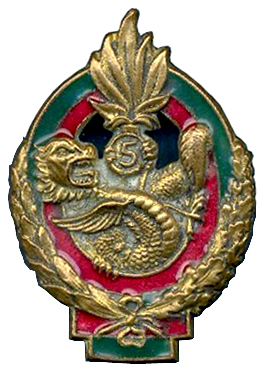
5^{e} R.E.I Type 2

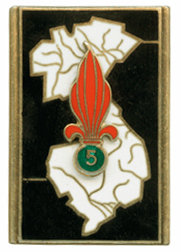
5^{e} R.E.I Type 3

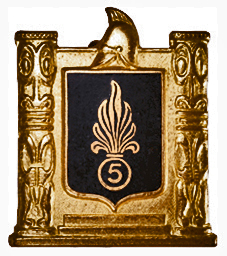
5^{e} R.M.P Type 1

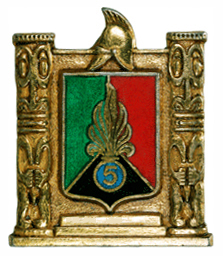
5^{e} R.M.P Type 2

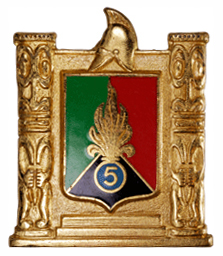
5^{e} R.E

=== Regimental Song ===
I
Vaillants guerriers de ce Régiment
Vous qui luttiez si superbement
En maintenant dans la tourmente
L’Honneur et la Fidélité
Vos successeurs ont serré les rangs
Donné leur cœur et versé leur sang
En combattant sans épouvante
Pour le 5^{e} Étranger

Le front haut et l’âme fière
Marchant du pas de nos anciens
Nous suivons dans la poussière
Un glorieux chemin
La boue sombre des rizières
Scella notre destin
Donnant ce nom qui sonne clair
Régiment du TONKIN

II
Toujours plus haut flotte fièrement
Le beau drapeau de ce Régiment
Jetant au vent notre devise
D’Honneur et de Fidélité
Et sans l’écrin des plis glorieux
Tout le TONKIN revit à nos yeux
En le voyant que chacun dise
C’est le 5^{e} Étranger

=== Decorations ===
The regimental colors are decorated with:

- Croix de guerre 1939 1945 with:
  - 1 citation at the orders of the armed forces
- croix de guerre des TOE with:
  - 2 citations at the orders of the armed forces

Fourragere:

- with colors of the croix de guerre des TOE

=== Honours ===
==== Battle Honours ====
- Camerone 1863
- Sontay 1883
- Bac-Minh 1884
- Tuyen-Quang 1885
- Langson 1885
- Indochine 1945-1946-1949-1954
- AFN 1952–1962

== Notable officers & legionnaires ==
- Chef de bataillon Raoul Magrin-Vernerey - from 1933 to 1937
- Lieutenant Chenel - from 1941 to 1947
- Colonel Alessandri - regimental commander 1941
- Colonel Henri Dufour, commandant 3/5 - 1951-1952 - regimental commander of the 1st Foreign Parachute Regiment 1^{e} REP
- Colonel Serge Andolenko, officer at foreign status, saint-cyrien promotion RIF

== See also ==
- List of French Foreign Legion units
- Major (France)
- French Foreign Legion Music Band (MLE)
- Pierre Segretain
- 2nd Foreign Engineer Regiment

== connected articles ==
- 5e RE - History & Images of the 5e RE(I)
- Marching regiment
