= Alastair Crawford =

Internet entrepreneur

- Occupation: Businessman

Alastair Crawford is CEO and founder of i-CD Publishing, the precursor to 192.com.

== Career ==
Crawford founded i-CD Publishing (UK) Ltd in 1997, which published the UK-info Disk range. He was the first person to publish the electoral roll on CD ROM, which led to a legal dispute with Royal Mail, settled in 2004. The case was mentioned in the book Silent State, by Heather Brooke.

Crawford was also the first to publish a UK directory enquiry site 192.com and the first to challenge BT's monopoly of directory enquiries.
