= Music of the Foreign Legion =

- Musique de la Légion étrangère (MLE)
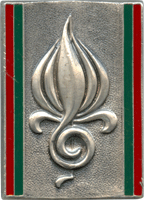
- Active: 1831 - present
- Country: France
- Branch: French Army
- Garrison/HQ: 1st Foreign Regiment 1^{er} RE
- Nickname(s): "The Commandant's Own"
- March: Le Boudin (Official Legion March); Le Boudin (Official Legion Hymn)
- Website: Official Website of the MLE

The Music of the Foreign Legion (French: Musique de la Légion étrangère, MLE), formerly known as the Principal Music of the Foreign Legion (French: Musique principale de la Légion étrangère) is a military band of the French Foreign Legion.

French or foreign, musicians or not, they all volunteer for the Legion and receive, first, basic military training within the 4th Foreign Regiment, then are either assigned to a line regiment or the 1st Foreign Regiment.

== History ==
The History of Foreign Legion Music commenced with the creation of the Foreign Legion by King Louis Philippe I in 1831. Legionnaires Musicians were regrouped at the corps of a common formation.

The Music Band maintains till the present the usage of the Turkish crescent (French: "Chapeau chinois"), an Ottoman music instrument of Turkish origin. This leather pavilion adorned by small bells, progressively abandoned during the 19th century by most of the military music units, was conserved by the Legion which decorated it with horsehair, in reference to an old Muslim custom adopted by the regiments of Africa: the horsehair underneath the combatant rider was a sign of courage. Exposed in front the tent of the chief qaid, they became the symbol of command. The music of the Foreign Legion is distinguished also by the usage of Fifes, heir to the Swiss traditions of old times and the low beat of the snare drums.

The Music of the Legion also conserves another tradition from the disbanded Hohenlohe Regiment. In 1830, this regiment, ancestor of the Legion paraded at a slow cadence: 88 military steps/minute against 120 for other units. It is this unique cadence which confers a majestic and powerful symbol not just for the Music of the Foreign Legion but for the Legion as a whole.

During 1831, the number of musicians was regulated by the military habits of the time: one director of music, one bandmaster, a drum major and 28 musicians.

Numerous years of supporting work and persisting efforts put this formation in a dignified state of production. However, the Legionnaires often hailed from regions in Europe were music reigned. Eventually, despite the modest means of existence, the music of the Legion has been remarked and renowned for its musical qualities.

Towards 1860, the band reached 40 musicians. The music was accordingly directed by Wilhem who composed, from 16 imposed measures (French: mesures imposes) on French regiments, the march of the Foreign Legion, the Le Boudin.

At the end of 1887, a string Instruments orchestra was created. The sorting arrangements of popular themes, and renowned opera environments composed the first repertory.

At the declaration of the World War I, in 1914, the music was dissolved and the forming Legionnaires filled the ranks of combat units in order to enlarge the combatant ranks. However, as soon as peace prevailed again, the music was reformed.

The wind band and symphonic orchestra witnessed a continuous crescendo of appreciation. With their fifes, bugles, fanfare trumpets and the drumline, its fanfare band was one of the Legion's most distinctive units.

In 1940, the Music was again dismantled to participate to the war effort. The Music was reconstituted again in 1946, however the String Orchestra ceased to exist. Nevertheless, the Fanfare Band remained in service till today.

In 1962, the Music left Sidi-bel-Abbès and came to garrison with the 1st Foreign 1^{er} RE at Aubagne, its barracks as of present.

Since 1999, within the cadres of the restructuring of the French Army, the music lost the designation of "Principal Music" and witnessed a decrease from a hundred bandsmen to just 55.

== The Music of the Foreign Legion (MLE) today ==
The "Music of the Foreign Legion" is renowned for the particular participation to grand military manifestations and maneuvers. The passage of the band on the Champs Elysées on July 14, is an recognizable image known by the grand public audience. The Music of the Foreign Legion (MLE) is requested and demanded in France as well as overseas in international military music festivals.

The music is produced frequently in various civilian lieu and environments as well. Within this title, the music can be considered as the Ambassador of the Foreign Legion and the entire French Armed Forces. The variety of the repertory and the talents of the Musicians Legionnaires allows the music to demonstrate and produce tuned performances, both in a classical register and extended modern theme context.

In complete formation, the music can be produced either in a classical musical orchestra or in a big band formation. The music formation is equally capable in sizing to a reduced tune of a Quintet and Octet.

The music is considered the patrimonial tune of all songs and marches of the Legion, all which are a reflection of the virtues of the Legionnaires. The Music usually tours France and produces itself in a vast array of performances and lieu, including Hong-Kong, Mannheim, London, Florence, Halifax, Seoul, Moscow (Spasskaya Tower Military Music Festival and Tattoo), Santiago. The band's musicians, regrouped around the Chapeau Chinois, harbor the insignias of the 1st Foreign Regiment 1^{er} RE and the Band, carrying the preserved principal reputation of the Foreign Legion.

=== Musical particularities ===
The "Music of the Foreign Legion" today keeps an old tradition of French military bands – the Chinese Hat, a tradition from the Army of Africa and fifes.

The Chinese Hat, a leather pavilion harnessing small bells, and surmounted by a grenade with seven flames, is of Turkish origin. Progressively abandoned by most music bands everywhere since the early 20th century, the latter was kept by the Legion which adorned it with horsehair tail. Their presence are found in an old Islamic custom adopted by the regiments of Africa: bringing back a horsehair tail situated beneath a killed combatant rider was a testimony of courage.

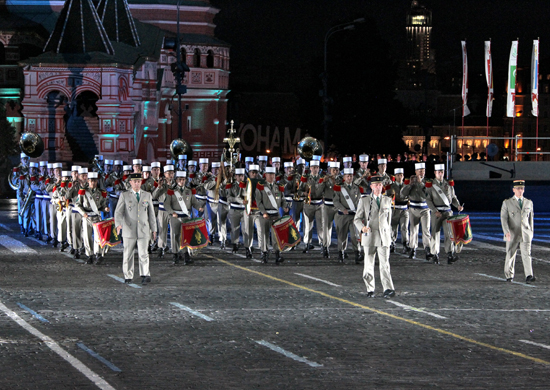
The MLE marching at the Spasskaya Tower, Red Square in Moscow, Russia.

Exposed in front of the tent of the chief qaid, these horsehairs became a command symbol.

==== Band Fifers ====
The fifes, an instrument of Swiss origin, which appeared in France during the reign of Louis XI of France, have accompanied until the revolutionary wars the drums of the French Infantry. They fell into disuse and were only conserved by certain Imperial units such the Imperial Guard or Swiss Guard. The legion has conserved thus the repertory of the Fifres.

Musicians play marches and other songs in an indifferent manner with fifes or their modern equivalent, the piccolos. The drumline equally presents the characteristic to wear its snare drums low, the inferior circle being at the level of the knees.

The music of the Legion distinguishes from other musical formations of the French Army by the particular marching rhythm of its marches. The Legion parades at 88 paces instead of 120 paces for the other units. This slow and powerful rhythm earns the various folklores of the Legion, their allure in military parades.

==== Le Boudin – Regimental Slow March ====
The origins of Le Boudin, as the Legion's official hymn and march, are wrongly misunderstood and inappropriately portrayed at many levels. Le Boudin refers to the perfect roll-up of the tents placed in the combat bags and which was voluntarily called "Boudin" by Legionaries. It was a little after the departure of the Foreign Regiment to Mexico that Wilhem, the Director of Music then, composed that March which became the official Regimental March of the Foreign Legion.

The actual lyrics and words were adopted towards 1870: the King of the Belgians requested his subjects not to combat for France and numerous young Alsatians and Lorranians accordingly volunteered in the Legion. It is the official regimental slow march of the Legion.

==== Composition ====
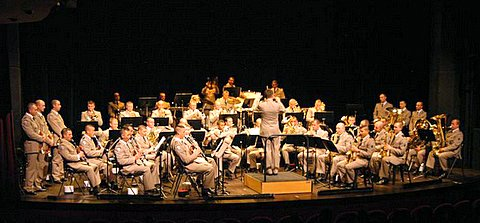
A classical formation performance of the MLE.

The fanfare and drumline formation consists of 18 drummers and buglers playing Field Drums, snare drums, the Bass Drummer, the clash cymbalist, the Buglers (French: Clairon), the Cavalry fanfare trumpeters and fifers, together with the Turkish crescent bearer.

The wind formation in concert configuration consists of 32 Musicians with Clarinets, Saxophones, Trumpets, Cornets, French horns, Trombones, Double basses, Baritone horns, and Sousaphones. In marching band configuration, the 32 musicians are organized into:

- Trombones and Bass Trombones
- Trumpets, Cornets, Flugelhorns
- French Horns
- Saxophones, Clarinets, Piccolos
- Tubas, Baritone horns, Euphoniums, Sousaphones

In total, the actual "Music if the Foreign Legion" led by the Director of Music is composed of 65 parading Legionnaires Musicians: 1 Officer (who serves as the Band Drum Major), 12 Sous-Officiers de Légion (in reference designation to ranks from Legion Sergents to Legion Majors), and 52 Legionnaires.

==== Recruitment – formation ====
During the recruitment of the Legionnaires; those who were former musicians, pass an audition during selection. At that moment, it would be decided if, at the end of their basic instruction, they would be deployed to a force regiment or would be directly deployed to serve in the "MLE".

On another hand, each Legion regiment, houses for their own ceremonial customs, military parades and marching songs, their own respective Bugle or Cavalry Trumpet Legionnaires. Throughout the course of their careers, these regimental Legionnaires Musicians can be brought to serve in the Foreign Legion Music Band (MLE) on any designated occasion or time duration.

The particularity of recruitment at the Foreign Legion is of such, that some of these Musician Legionnaires have studied often in some of the best conservatories in the world or have already performed on the grand international musical scenes. While the Legionnaires of the (MLE) are primarily focused on their tune compositions, they also deploy on operational missions and conduct various field trainings, as combatants first.

As far as formation is concerned, the Legionnaires adopt the Musical formation "cursus" of the French Armed Forces. They also conduct several musical courses, in garrison or in metropolis, administered by civilian musician professors of various conservatories.

=== Music repertory of the Foreign Legion ===
Marches of the Legion (16)

- 1^{er} RE
- Joyful (French: Gai) Legionnaire
- 1^{er} REP
- 2^{e} REP
- 1^{er} REG
- 2^{e} REG
- 1^{er} REC
- Marche du GRLE
- Grand Atlas
- Anne-Marie
- Marche du 5^{e} REI
- Nos Kepi Blanc (the 13)
- Le Criquet
- Defile du 3^{e} REI
- Marche des Volontaires Etrangers
- Le Boudin

Traditional Marches and Songs of the Armed Forces(18)

- Les Grenadiers de la Vieille Garde at Waterloo
- Marche des Bonnets a Poils
- Chant des Partisans
- La Sarabande
- Marche pour la ceremonie des Turcs
- Africains (les)
- Marche Funebre de Chopin
- Robert Bruce
- Adieu Vieille Europe
- Le Fanion de la Legion
- Chant du 5^{e} RE
- A L'Etendard
- Marseillaise
  (National Anthem)
- Saint-Cyr
- Sans Peur
- Marche des Tirailleurs
- Marche des Cent-Suisses
- Frei Weg

Other marches played in concerts and parades (22)

- Nouveau Arigang Marche
- Colonel Bogey
- Century March
- Carillon
- Chairman (the)
- March of the Irish Guard
- Friendships' Hymn
- Fehrbelliner Reitermarsch
- Rue Republique
- La Mer
- De Guello
- Military Escort
- Mediterranean
- Proschanie Slavanki
- Vstretchniy Proebragenskogo Polka
- Minauderie
- Bolero Militaire
- Jeune Chef
- Signal March
- Sons of the Brave
- Taptoe Majorette
- Telefon

==== French Foreign Legion Music Productions ====
Bons baisers de Russie (15)

- Defile du 3 – tradition
- New Baroque Suite
- Chant du 5^{e}ME REI – tradition
- Ciocalia – air populaire
- Marche Russe
- L'Armee des Ombres
- Marche de la DSPLE
- Calembour Musical (Quintette de cuivres)
- A Moi La Legion
- James Bond Theme
- Preobrazhensky March
- Les Nuits Moscovites
- Arma Invicta
- Mancini Spectacular
- Marche de la Legion Etrangere

De Sidi Bel Abbes a Aubagne (17)

- Sidi Bel Abbes
- Marche Militaire Francaise
- Adieu Vieille Europe – traditional
- Bonaparte (extraits)
- De Guello
- Appalachian Legacy
- Flippant
- Whimsical
- Sorta Mixed Up
- Danse des Sabre
- Chile Lindo
- The Imperial March
- La Mome Piaf
- Rue Republique
- P.M.O Polka
- Marche du 1^{er} RE
- Marche de la Legion Etrangere

Héros (Golden Production – 14)

- Le Boudin – song
- Le Soleil Brille
- Adieu Vieille Europe
- Un Dur, Un Vrai, Un Tatoue
- Non, je ne regrette rien
- La Marseillaise
- Lili Marleen
- Le Chant de L'oignon
- Sous le ciel de Paris
- El Deguello
- Le Fanion de la Legion
- La Mer
- Bolero
- Le Boudin – instrumental version

Veronika (14)

- Nos Kepis Blancs
- Ben Hur
- Veronika
- Aux Mort de la Patrie
- Teinklied Im Winter
- A La Hussarde
- Ready Steady Brass
- Marche Lorraine
- Danse avec les Loups
- Trois Jeunes Tambour
- Un Americain a Paris
- The Free Lance March
- Glenn Miller Medley
- La Marche de la Legion Etrangere

=== Insignias ===
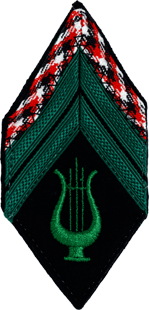
Insigne de manche of a caporal of "MLE" (Field Drumline)

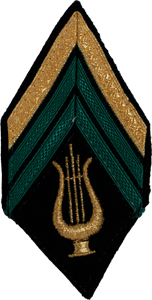
Insigne de manche of a caporal-chef of the "MLE" (Band)

== See also ==
- List of Foreign Legion units
- French Military Bands - France
  - Bagad Lann Bihoue - under the French Navy
  - French Republican Guard Cavalry Band with Natural trumpets and Kettledrum, France's Own
  - French Chasseurs Band including Alphorns - under the 27th Battalion of Chasseurs Alpins
- Italian Military Bands - Italy
  - Italian Carabinieri Bands - under the Carabinieri
  - Italian Bersaglieri Bands - under the Bersaglieri
- Spanish Military Bands - Spain
  - Musical Unit of the Spanish Royal Guard
  - Corps Drums - under the Regulares
  - Corps Drums - under the 1st King's Immemorial Infantry Regiment
  - Bugle Bands - under the Spanish Legion
  - Bugle Bands - under the Brigada "Almogáraves" VI, de Paracaidistas
- United States military bands - United States
  - United States Marine Band, U.S. President's Own
  - United States Marine Drum and Bugle Corps, The Commandant's Own
  - United States Army Band
  - United States Navy Band
  - United States Air Force Band
  - United States Coast Guard Band
- Russian military bands - Russia
  - Presidential Band of the Russian Federation, Russian Head of State's Own - under the Kremlin Regiment, Presidential Regiment
  - Admiralty Navy Band of Russia
  - Central Military Band of the Ministry of Defense of Russia
  - Moscow Military Music College
  - Special Exemplary Military Band of the Guard of Honor Battalion of Russia - under the 154th Preobrazhensky Regiment
- British Military Bands - United Kingdom
  - Royal Corps of Army Music
  - Royal Marines Band Service
  - Royal Air Force Music Services
- Canadian Military Bands - Canada
  - Canadian military bands
- German Military Bands - Germany
  - Military bands of the Bundeswehr
