= Le Boudin =

Official march song of the French Foreign Legion

"Le Boudin" (French pronunciation: [lə budɛ̃]), officially "Marche de la Légion Étrangère" (English "March of the Foreign Legion"), is the official march of the Foreign Legion. "Le Boudin" is a reference to boudin, a type of blood sausage or black pudding. "Le boudin" colloquially meant the gear (rolled up in a blanket) that used to be carried atop the backpacks of Legionnaires.

== Overview ==
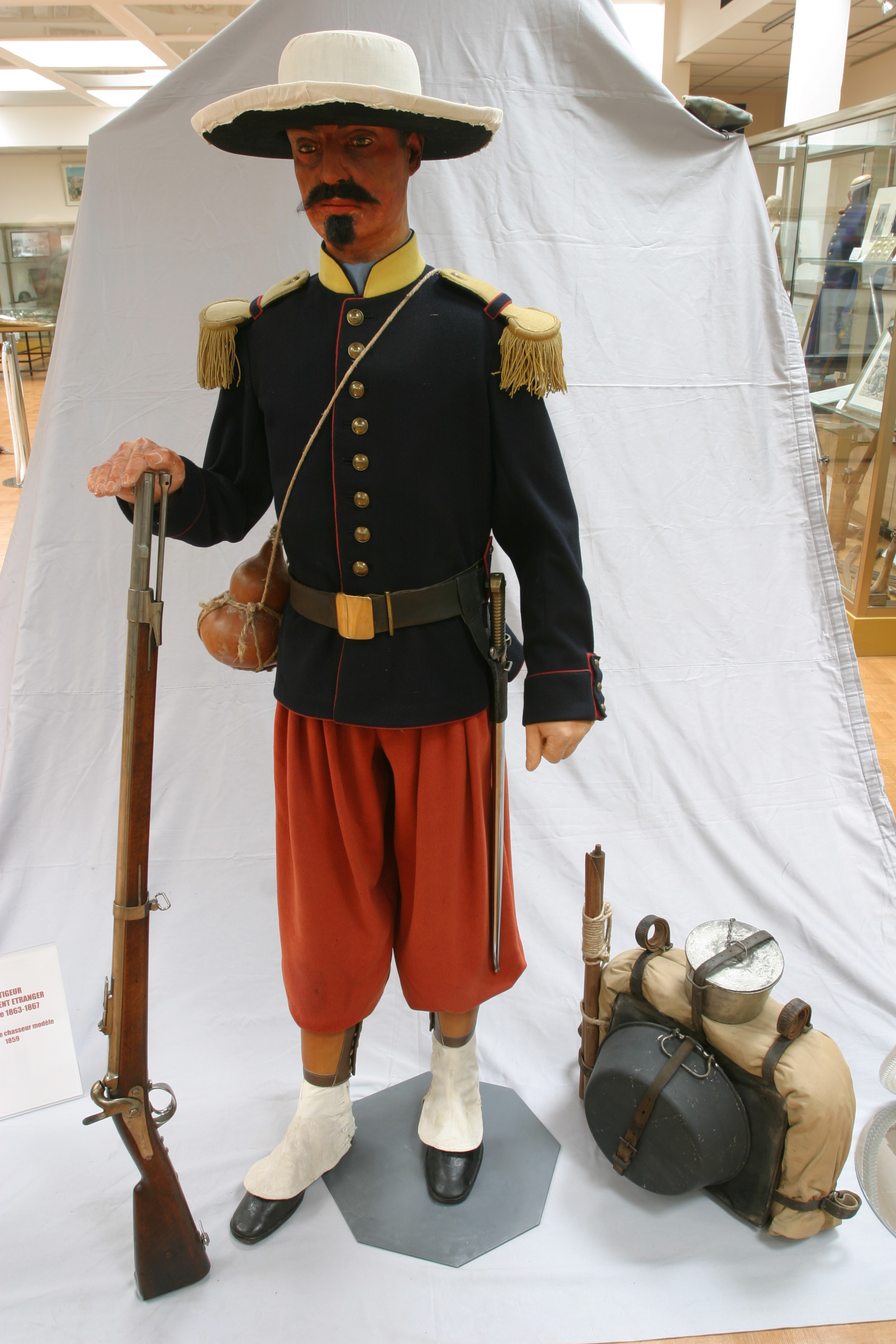
Replica of a Legionnaire in 1863. His boudin is draped over the haversack on the floor to the right.

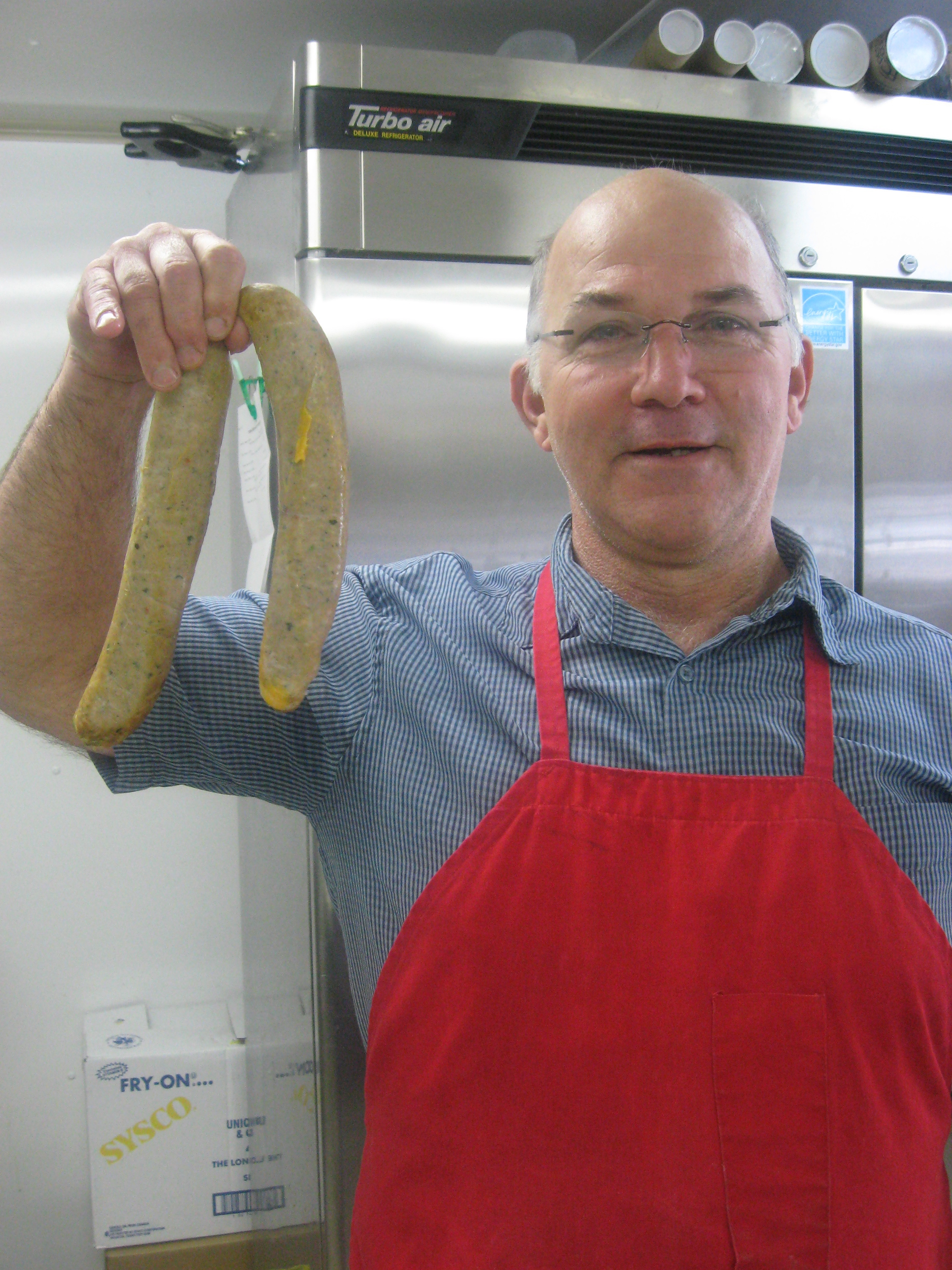
Sausage or boudin that gives the military item its name. Boudins are made in many colors, from off-white to dark reddish-black.

The song relates the Legion's feat of arms in Tuyên Quang (1884–1885) and in Camerone (1863), the date of which (April 30) is celebrated as the Legion's anniversary.

While the tune was composed prior to the Legion's departure for Mexico in the 1860s, the lyrics were progressively composed after the Franco-Prussian War since Alsatians and Lorrains flocked to the legion after the regions were annexed by Germany. The song makes also repeated reference to the fact that the Belgians are "lazy shirkers", which comes from the fact that Belgian King Leopold II, who wished to remain neutral in the Franco-German conflict, asked the French government not to commit the Belgian Legionnaires into the conflict. France agreed, and the Belgian Legionnaires remained in French Algeria, the Legion's home, to the dismay of the rest of the Legionnaires. The song thus says that there is no blood sausage (boudin) for the Belgians. The song also mentions the Swiss who constituted the most important foreign contingent of the Legion in the 1870s.

Another hypothesis suggests that because the Legion accepted no Frenchmen (hence the adjective in its name), a Frenchman wishing to join could do so only by pretending to be a (French-speaking) foreigner, a Belgian. Since a person wishing to remain anonymous and lie about his identity often turned out to be a criminal wanting to evade the law and a prison sentence, and criminals rarely make the best soldiers, the "Belgians" ended up with a bad reputation.

== Presentation ==
"Le Boudin" is sung while standing to attention or marching by all ranks of the Foreign Legion. The Legion marches at only 88 steps per minute, much slower than the 120 steps per minute of all other French military units. Consequently, the Legion contingent at the Bastille Day military parade march brings up the rear. Nevertheless, the Legion gets the most enthusiastic response from the crowd.

== In films ==
- The song is sung by the depleted half-company of Legionnaires in P. C. Wren's classic novel Beau Geste when the tiny garrison fool the besieging Tuaregs into thinking that they are still at full strength. The Hollywood versions of Beau Geste don't include this vital part of the story, but the 1982 mini-series by the BBC stays true to the book and shows the soldiers singing the song.
- The 1978 film March or Die also features legionnaires singing the song, at the command of their officer Major Foster, played by Gene Hackman.
- The song also appears in the 1998 film Legionnaire starring Jean-Claude Van Damme, though in this film the soldiers don't sing the song to its traditional tune.
- In the Netflix series Undercover, part of this song is sung in the episode Legio Patria Nostra by Redwan, a former Legionnaire, in order to identify whether the main character, Bob Lemmens is really a Foreign Legionnaire or an imposter; to which Bob responds with correct lyrics.
- In the 2022 French-German experimental drama film Human Flowers of Flesh the song is sung in its entirety on the soundtrack while a legionnaire makes his bed.

== Lyrics ==
| French | English |
|---|---|
| Refrain: Tiens, voilà du boudin, voilà du boudin, voilà du boudin Pour les Alsaciens, les Suisses et les Lorrains. Pour les Belges il n'y en a plus. Pour les Belges il n'y en a plus. Ce sont des tireurs au cul. Pour les Belges il n'y en a plus. Pour les Belges il n'y en a plus. Ce sont des tireurs au cul. 1er couplet: Nous sommes des dégourdis, Nous sommes des lascars Des types pas ordinaires. Nous avons souvent notre cafard, Nous sommes des légionnaires. Au Tonkin, la Légion immortelle À Tuyen-Quang illustré notre drapeau, Héros de Camerone et frères modèles Dormez en paix dans vos tombeaux. (Refrain) 2ème couplet: Nos anciens ont su mourir Pour la gloire de la Légion. Nous saurons bien tous périr Suivant la tradition. Au cours de nos campagnes lointaines, Affrontant la fièvre et le feu, Oublions avec nos peines, La mort qui nous oublie si peu. Nous la Légion. (Refrain) | Chorus: Hey, here's blood sausage, here's blood sausage, here's blood sausage, For the Alsatians, the Swiss, and the Lorrains, For the Belgians, there is none left, For the Belgians, there is none left, They are lazy, For the Belgians, there is none left, For the Belgians, there is none left, They are lazy. [des tireurs au cul - literally: ass shooters] 1st verse: We are crafty, We are rogues, Not ordinary guys, We often have our cockroach, [dark moods] We are Legionnaires. In Tonkin, the Immortal Legion Honoured our flag at Tuyen Quang. [illustré - illustrious translated as honoured] Heroes of Camarón and model brothers Sleep in peace in your tombs. (Repeat chorus) 2nd verse: Our ancestors knew how to die For the glory of the Legion. We will all know how to perish Following tradition. During our far-off campaigns, Facing fever and fire, Let us forget, along with our sorrows, Death, which forgets us so little. We the Legion. (Repeat chorus) |
