= 192nd Military Police Battalion =

192nd Military Police Battalion (C/D)
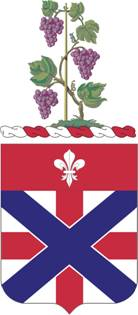
- 192nd Military Police Bn Coat of arms
- Active: 1672 – present
- Country: United States
- Branch: Army National Guard
- Type: Battalion
- Role: Detainee Operations
- Garrison/HQ: Niantic, Connecticut
- Nickname: Warriors
- Motto: SKILL AND FORCE!
- Engagements: Revolutionary War: Saratoga; New York 1776; New York 1777; Connecticut 1777; Connecticut 1778; Connecticut 1779; Connecticut 1780; Connecticut 1781; Rhode Island 1778; Civil War: Bull Run; Chancellorsville; Gettysburg; Mississippi River; Petersburg; Georgia 1862; South Carolina 1862; South Carolina 1863; South Carolina 1864; Florida 1864; North Carolina 1865; World War I: Oise-Aisne; Meuse-Argonne; Champagne; World War II: East Indies; Papua; Guadalcanal; Northern Solomons; New Guinea; Bismarck Archipelago; Leyte (with Arrowhead); Luzon (with Arrowhead); Global war on terrorism: Iraq Campaign; Decorations: Presidential Unit Citation (Army) - Papua; Philippine Presidential Citation (Army); Meritorious Unit Commendation (Army) Iraq

Commanders
- Notable commanders: Benedict Arnold

Insignia
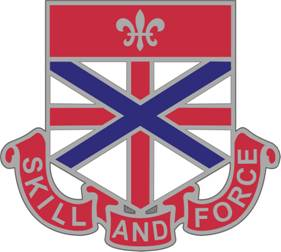
- Distinctive Unit Insignia

The 192nd Military Police Battalion is a United States National Guard battalion assigned to the Connecticut Army National Guard. The battalion is assigned to the 85th Troop Command and is the Battalion Command for the Headquarters and Headquarters Company (HHC), the 143rd Military Police Company (GS), the 643rd Military Police Company (GS), and the 928th Military Police Military Working Dog (MWD) Detachment. It is one of several National Guard units with colonial roots.

== Lineage ==
The battalion's first ancestor was established 26 June 1672 in the Connecticut Militia as the Regiment of Fairfield County.

In the Revolutionary War a Militia of the 1st Battalion, 192d Field Artillery fought in the Battle of Saratoga (1777) and New York (1776–77).

The unit was re-designated as Company I and called to active duty to play its part in the Civil War efforts in September 1862. The unit fought in the Battle of Bull Run, Gettysburg, Georgia (1862), South Carolina (1862) and Louisiana (1863), Cold Harbor, and Petersburg.

During World War I, personnel from the unit took part in Oise-Aisne, Meuse-Argonne, and Champagne (1918) Campaigns.

The unit was re-designated in 1921 as the 192d Field Artillery Regiment and reassigned to the 43rd Infantry Division. The 192nd Field Artillery Regiment was mustered into federal service and assigned as the 68th Field Artillery Brigade, 43rd Infantry Division. It was re-designated as the 192nd Field Artillery Battalion on 10 February 1942.

During World War II the unit deployed to New Zealand in October 1942 and fought in the Pacific Theater of Operations in the Guadalcanal, New Solomon Islands, New Guinea, and the Philippines Campaign.

The 2/192nd Field Artillery Battalion was mobilized in April 2002 in support of the Winter Olympics in Salt Lake City, Utah. In September 2003 the Battalion was mobilized in support of Operation Noble Eagle III and was re-designated as the 192nd Chemical Battalion. The 192nd Chemical Battalion officially was re-designated into the 192nd Military Police Battalion 1 September 2008. On 27 May 2009 the Battalion and HHC was once again ordered into federal service in support of Operation Iraqi Freedom VII. Headquarters and Headquarters Company deployed to Camp Cropper, Iraq, where it ran Detainee Operations. The unit redeployed on 10 May 2010.

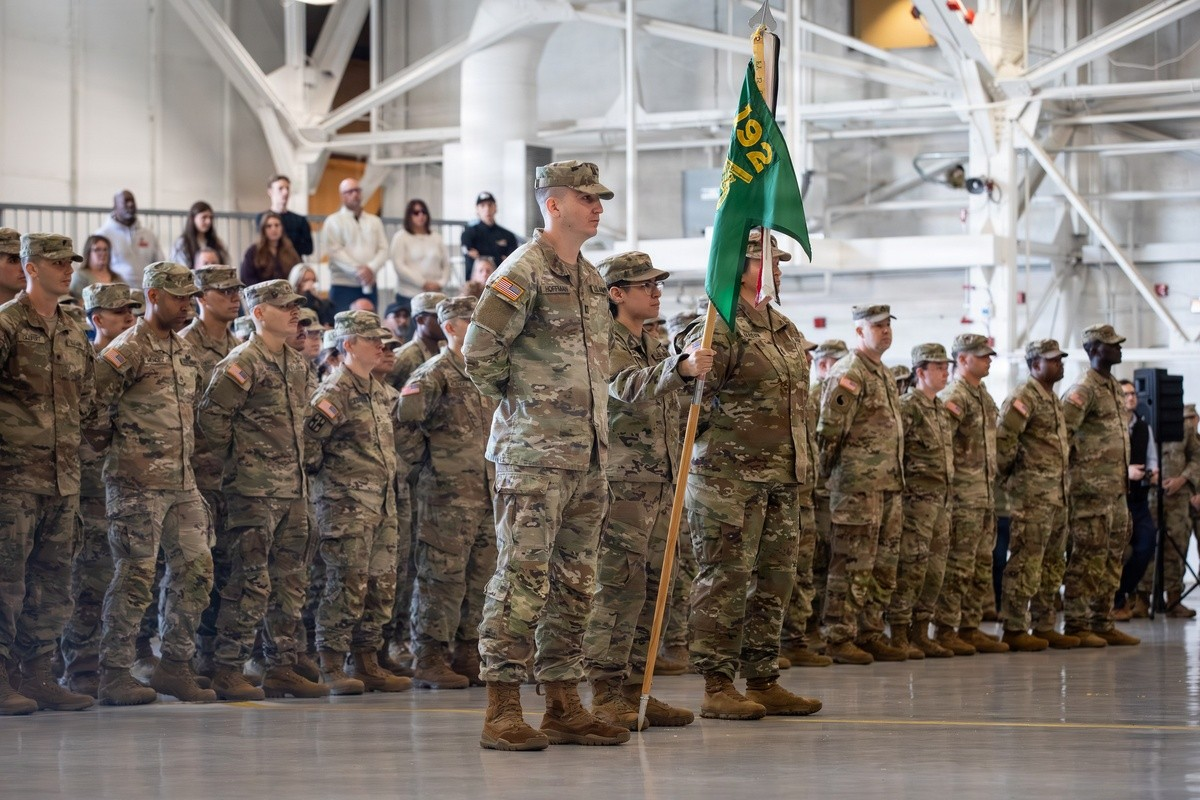
150 Soldiers assigned to Headquarters and Headquarters Company of the 192nd Military Police Battalion, Connecticut Army National Guard, participating in a deployment ceremony at Bradley Air National Guard Base, East Granby, Connecticut.

150 soldiers assigned to the Battalion's Headquarters and Headquarters Company (HHC) participated in a deployment ceremony at Bradley Air National Guard Base, East Granby, Connecticut in support of the 2026 Iran War (codenamed Operation Epic Fury) on 28 April 2026.

== Unit insignia and coat of arms ==
The unit insignia is a Silver color metal and enamel device 1 1/8 inches (2.9 cm) in height, consisting of a shield emblazoned with an argent, a cross Gules, overall a saltire Azure, that portion of the saltire upon the cross fimbriated of the field; on a chief of the second, a fleur-de-lis of the first. Attached below the shield is a red scroll inscribed "Skill and Force" in Silver letters.

The shield is white, the old facings of the Infantry. The red cross is for Revolutionary War service and the blue saltire for Civil War service. The fleur-de-lis on the red chief, the present color for Artillery, represents service as Artillery in France during World War I.

The distinctive unit insignia was originally approved for the 192d Field Artillery Regiment on 25 March 1927. It was redesignated for the 192d Field Artillery Battalion on 28 July 1942. It was redesignated for the 192d Artillery Regiment on 15 January 1971. It was redesignated for the 192d Field Artillery Regiment on 19 July 1972. The insignia was redesignated with the description updated, for the 192d Chemical Battalion on 18 November 2003. It was redesignated for the 192d Military Police Battalion effective 1 September 2008.
