= 192nd Infantry Division (France) =

- Active: July 19, 1939
- Country: France
- Branch: French Army
- Type: Infantry

The 192nd Infantry Division, or the 192e division d'infanterie, was a French infantry division during World War II. The 192nd Infantry Division originally operated in the French Levant.

== Overview ==
The 192nd Infantry Division established on July 19, 1939, as the 2nd Mixed Brigade of the Levant, however it was shortly thereafter on September 10, 1939, expanded and renamed the 2nd Infantry Division of the Levant. On October 5, 1939, the 2nd Infantry Division of the Levant was renamed once more to 192nd Infantry Division.

== Organization ==
The 192nd Infantry Division was originally composed of the following:

- Reconnaissance Group of the 192nd Infantry Division
- 6th Foreign Infantry Regiment
- 10th North African Demi-Brigade
- 17th Senegalese Regiment of Tirailleurs
- One battalion of the 41st Colonial Infantry Regiment
- Two battalions of the 80th Field Artillery Regiment, North African
