= 192 BC =

192 BC in various calendars
- Gregorian calendar: 192 BC; CXCII BC
- Ab urbe condita: 562
- Ancient Egypt era: XXXIII dynasty, 132
- Pharaoh: Ptolemy V Epiphanes, 12
- Ancient Greek Olympiad (summer): 147th Olympiad (victor)¹
- Assyrian calendar: 4559
- Balinese saka calendar: N/A
- Bengali calendar: −785 – −784
- Berber calendar: 759
- Buddhist calendar: 353
- Burmese calendar: −829
- Byzantine calendar: 5317–5318
- Chinese calendar: 戊申年 (Earth Monkey); 2506 or 2299 — to — 己酉年 (Earth Rooster); 2507 or 2300
- Coptic calendar: −475 – −474
- Discordian calendar: 975
- Ethiopian calendar: −199 – −198
- Hebrew calendar: 3569–3570
- Hindu calendars
- Vikram Samvat: −135 – −134
- Shaka Samvat: N/A
- Kali Yuga: 2909–2910
- Holocene calendar: 9809
- Iranian calendar: 813 BP – 812 BP
- Islamic calendar: 838 BH – 837 BH
- Javanese calendar: N/A
- Julian calendar: N/A
- Korean calendar: 2142
- Minguo calendar: 2103 before ROC 民前2103年
- Nanakshahi calendar: −1659
- Seleucid era: 120/121 AG
- Thai solar calendar: 351–352
- Tibetan calendar: ས་ཕོ་སྤྲེ་ལོ་ (male Earth-Monkey) −65 or −446 or −1218 — to — ས་མོ་བྱ་ལོ་ (female Earth-Bird) −64 or −445 or −1217

Year 192 BC was a year of the pre-Julian Roman calendar. At the time it was known as the Year of the Consulship of Flamininus and Ahenobarbus (or, less frequently, year 562 Ab urbe condita). The denomination 192 BC for this year has been used since the early medieval period, when the Anno Domini calendar era became the prevalent method in Europe for naming years.

== Events ==
=== By place ===
==== Greece ====
- The Achaeans respond to Sparta's renewed interest in recovering lost territory by sending an envoy to Rome with a request for help. In response, the Roman Senate sends the praetor Atilius with a navy, as well as an embassy headed by Titus Quinctius Flamininus.
- Not waiting for the Roman fleet to arrive, the Achaean army and navy head towards Gythium under the command of Philopoemen. The Achaean fleet under Tiso is defeated by the Spartan fleet. On land, the Achaeans are unable to defeat the Spartan forces outside Gythium and Philopoemen retreats to Tegea.
- When Philopoemen reenters Laconia for a second attempt, his forces are ambushed by the Spartan tyrant, Nabis, but nevertheless Philopoemen manages to gain a victory over the Spartan forces.
- Philopoemen's plans for capturing Sparta itself are put on hold at the request of the Roman envoy Flaminius after his arrival in Greece. In return, Nabis decides, for the moment, to accept the status quo.
- Nabis then appeals to the Aetolians for help. They send 1,000 cavalry under the command of Alexamenus to Sparta. However, the Aetolians murder Nabis and temporarily occupy Sparta. The Aetolian troops seize the palace and set about looting the city, but the inhabitants of Sparta are able to rally and force them leave the city. Philopoemen, however, takes advantage of the Aetolian treachery and enters Sparta with his Achaean army. Now in full control of Sparta, Philopoemen forces Sparta to become a member state of the Achaean League.
- Seleucid forces under their king, Antiochus III, invade Greece at the invitation of the Aetolian League, who are revolting against the Romans. The Aetolians appoint him commander in chief of their league. Antiochus lands in Demetrias, Thessaly with only 10,500 men and occupies Euboea. However, he finds little support for his cause in central Greece.

== Deaths ==
- Nabis, tyrant and last independent ruler (from 207 BC) of Sparta
- Xiang Bo, Chinese nobleman of the Chu State (Seven Kingdoms)
