= French Foreign Legion =

French Army corps of foreign nationals

Coordinates: 43.2925°N 5.5534°E

- Légion étrangère
- The Foreign Legion's emblem
- Active: 10 March 1831 – present
- Country: France
- Branch: French Army
- Type: Assault troops Light Infantry; Foreign legion
- Role: Land warfare Expeditionary warfare Airborne forces Special Operations Capable
- Size: 9,000 soldiers
- Nicknames: La Légion "The Legion"
- Patron: Saint Anthony
- Mottos: Honneur et Fidélité; Legio Patria Nostra
- Branch colours Colour of Beret: Red and Green Green
- March: Le Boudin
- Anniversaries: Camerone Day (30 April)
- Engagements: French conquest of Algeria; First Carlist War; Crimean War; French conquest of Vietnam; Second Italian War of Independence; French intervention in Mexico; French campaign against Korea; Franco-Prussian War; Sino-French War; Second Franco-Dahomean War; Second Madagascar expedition; Mandingo Wars; World War I; Levant Campaign; Rif War; World War II; Syria–Lebanon Campaign; Franco-Thai War; First Indochina War; Algerian War; Chadian-Libyan conflict; Shaba II; Lebanese Civil War 1975–1990; United Nations Interim Force in Lebanon (1978–present); Multinational Force in Lebanon 1982–1984; Corsican conflict; Gulf War; War on terror (2001–2008); Operation Enduring Freedom; War in Afghanistan; First Ivorian Civil War; Second Ivorian Civil War; Northern Mali conflict; Central African Republic Civil War (2012–2021); Central African Republic conflict (2013–2014); Operation Sangaris (2013–2016); European Union Military Operation in the Central African Republic (2014–2015)
- Website: www.terre.defense.gouv.fr/legion-etrangere (official website) legion-recrute.com (official recruitment website)

Commanders
- Commander: Brigadier General Christophe Passerat de La Chapelle
- Notable commanders: Général Paul-Frédéric Rollet

Insignia
- Non-ceremonial flag
- Abbreviation: FFL (English); L.É. (French)

The French Foreign Legion (French: Légion étrangère, also known simply as la Légion, 'the Legion') is a corps of the French Army created to allow foreign nationals into French service. The Legion was founded in 1831 and today consists of several specialities, namely infantry, cavalry, engineers, and airborne troops. It formed part of the Armée d'Afrique, French Army units associated with France's colonial project in North Africa, until the end of the Algerian War in 1962.

Legionnaires are today renowned as highly trained soldiers whose training focuses on traditional military skills and on the Legion's strong esprit de corps, as its men come from different countries with different cultures. Consequently, training is often described as not only physically challenging, but also very stressful psychologically. Legionnaires may apply for French citizenship after three years' service, or immediately after being wounded in the line of duty; this latter provision is known as "Français par le sang versé" ("French by spilled blood").

== History ==
The Foreign Legion was created by Louis Philippe, the King of the French, on 10 March 1831 to allow the incorporation of foreign nationals into the French Army from the foreign regiments of the Kingdom of France. Recruits included soldiers from the recently disbanded Swiss and German foreign regiments of the Bourbon monarchy and also people from shady backgrounds. The Royal Ordinance for the establishment of the new regiment specified that the foreigners recruited could only serve outside France. The French expeditionary force that had occupied Algiers in 1830 was in need of reinforcements, and the Legion was accordingly transferred by sea in detachments from Toulon to Algeria. Since its establishment in 1831, the Legion has consisted of hundreds of thousands in active service at its peak, and suffered the aggregated loss of nearly 40,000 men in France, Morocco, Tunisia, Madagascar, West Africa, Mexico, Italy, Crimea, Spain, Indo-China, Norway, Syria, Chad, Zaïre, Lebanon, Central Africa, Gabon, Kuwait, Rwanda, Djibouti, former Yugoslavia, Somalia, the Republic of Congo, Ivory Coast, Afghanistan, Mali, as well as others. The Legion was primarily used to help protect and expand the French colonial empire during the 19th century. The Foreign Legion was initially stationed only in Algeria, where it took part in the Pacification of Algeria. Subsequently, the Foreign Legion was deployed in a number of conflicts, including the First Carlist War in 1835, the Crimean War in 1854, the Second Italian War of Independence in 1859, the French intervention in Mexico in 1863, the Franco-Prussian War in 1870, the Tonkin Campaign and Sino-French War in 1883, supporting growth of the French colonial empire in Sub-Saharan Africa, the Second Franco-Dahomean War in 1892, the Second Madagascar expedition in 1895 and the Mandingo Wars in 1894. In World War I, the Foreign Legion fought in many critical battles on the Western Front. It played a smaller role in World War II than in World War I; it did, however, participate in the Norwegian, Syrian and North African campaigns. During the First Indochina War (1946–1954), the Foreign Legion saw its numbers swell. In Vietnam, the Legion lost a large number of men in the catastrophic Battle of Dien Bien Phu against forces of the Viet Minh.

Subsequent military campaigns included those during the Suez Crisis, the Battle of Algiers and various offensives in Algeria launched by General Maurice Challe including Operation Oranie and Operation Jumelles. During the Algerian War of Independence (1954–1962), the Foreign Legion came close to being disbanded after some officers, men, and the highly decorated 1st Foreign Parachute Regiment (1^{er} REP) took part in the Generals' putsch. In the 1960s and 1970s, Legion regiments had additional roles in sending units as a rapid deployment force to preserve French interests – in its former African colonies and in other nations as well; it also returned to its roots of being a unit always ready to be sent to conflict zones around the world.

A large portion of the Foreign Legion was relocated to Corsica following the during the early period of the Corsican conflict. Half of the Foreign Legion's soldiers operated in bases in Calvi, Bonifacio, and Corte, with other small outposts across Corsica. The Legion was used as military police and a rapid intervention force during the early period of the Corsican conflict. This, combined with prejudice from the Legion against Corsicans and growing Corsican nationalist sentiments, caused many Corsicans to adopt a negative attitude towards the Legion. Following an uprising in central Corsica and a peace agreement toward the FLNC, the Foreign Legion in Corsica only remains in Camp Raffalli in Calvi and military operations on the island and against the FLNC have remained limited.

Some notable operations include the Chadian–Libyan conflict in 1969–1972 (the first time that the Legion was sent in foreign operations after the Algerian War), 1978–1979, and 1983–1987; Kolwezi in what is now the Democratic Republic of the Congo in May 1978. In 1981, the 1st Foreign Regiment and Foreign Legion regiments took part in the Multinational Force in Lebanon. In 1990, Foreign Legion regiments were sent to the Persian Gulf and participated in Opération Daguet, part of Division Daguet. Following the Gulf War in the 1990s, the Foreign Legion helped with the evacuation of French citizens and foreigners in Rwanda, Gabon and Zaire. The Foreign Legion was also deployed to Cambodia, Somalia, Sarajevo, Bosnia and Herzegovina. In the mid-to late 1990s, the Foreign Legion was deployed to the Central African Republic, Congo-Brazzaville and in Kosovo. The French Foreign Legion also took part in operations in Rwanda in 1990–1994; and the Ivory Coast from 2002 to the present. In the 2000s, the Foreign Legion was deployed to Operation Enduring Freedom in Afghanistan, Opération Licorne in Ivory Coast, the EUFOR Tchad/RCA in Chad, and Operation Serval in the Northern Mali conflict.

As discussed below, other countries have attempted to emulate the French Foreign Legion model. The Foreign Legion was primarily used, as part of the Armée d'Afrique, to protect and expand the French colonial empire during the 19th century, but it also fought in almost all French wars including the Franco-Prussian War, World War I and World War II. The Foreign Legion has remained an important part of the French Army, and sea transport protected by the French Navy survived three Republics, the Second French Empire, two World Wars, the rise and fall of mass conscript armies, the dismantling of the French colonial empire, and the loss of the Foreign Legion's base, Algeria.

=== Conquest of Algeria 1830–1847 ===
Created to fight "outside mainland France", the Foreign Legion was stationed in Algeria, where it took part in the Algerian genocide and destruction of the natural habitat of the colony, notably by drying the marshes in the region of Algiers. The Foreign Legion was initially divided into six "national battalions" (Swiss, Poles, Germans, Italians, Spanish, and Dutch-Belgian). Smaller national groups, such as ten Englishmen recorded in December 1832, appear to have been placed randomly.

In late 1831, the first legionnaires landed in Algeria, the country that shaped its character and became the Foreign Legion's homeland for 130 years. The early years in Algeria were hard on the Legion because it was often sent to the worst postings and received the worst assignments, and its members were generally uninterested in the new colony of the French. The Legion served alongside the Battalions of Light Infantry of Africa, formed in 1832, which was a penal military unit made up of men with prison records who still had to do their military service or soldiers with serious disciplinary problems.

The Foreign Legion's first service in Algeria came to an end after only four years, as it was needed elsewhere.

=== Carlist War 1835–1839 ===
The French government sent the Foreign Legion to Spain to support Isabella II's claim to the Spanish throne against her uncle. On 28 June 1835, the unit was handed over to the Spanish government. The Foreign Legion landed via sea at Tarragona on 17 August with around 1,400 who were quickly dubbed Los Argelinos (the Algerians) by locals because of their previous posting.

The Foreign Legion's commander immediately dissolved the national battalions to improve the esprit de corps. Later, he also created three squadrons of lancers and an artillery battery from the existing force to increase independence and flexibility. The Foreign Legion was dissolved on 8 December 1838, when it had dropped to only 500 men. The survivors returned to France, many reenlisting in the new Foreign Legion along with many of their former Carlist enemies.

=== Crimean War ===
On 9 June 1854, the French ship Jean Bart embarked four battalions of the Foreign Legion for the Crimean Peninsula. A further battalion was stationed at Gallipoli as brigade depot. Eight companies drawn from both regiments of the Foreign Legion took part in the Battle of Alma (20 September 1854). Reinforcements by sea brought the Legion contingent up to brigade strength. As the "Foreign Brigade", it served in the Siege of Sevastopol, during the winter of 1854–1855.

The lack of equipment was particularly challenging and cholera hit the Allied expeditionary force. Nevertheless, the "leather bellies" (the nickname given to the legionnaires by the Russians because of the large cartridge pouches that they wore attached to their waist-belts), performed well. On 21 June 1855, the Third Battalion left Corsica for Crimea.

On 8 September the final assault was launched on Sevastopol. Two days later, the Second Foreign Regiment with flags and band playing ahead, marched through the streets of Sevastopol. Although initial reservations had been expressed about whether the Legion should be used outside Africa, the Crimean experience established its suitability for service in European warfare, as well as making a cohesive single entity of what had previously been two separate foreign regiments. Legion casualties in the Crimea were 1,703 killed and wounded out of total French losses by battle and disease of 95,615.

=== Italian Campaign 1859 ===
Like the rest of the "Army of Africa", the Foreign Legion provided detachments in the campaign of Italy. Two foreign regiments, grouped with the 2nd Regiment of Zouaves, were part of the Second Brigade of the Second Division of Mac Mahon's Corps. The Foreign Legion acquitted itself particularly well against the Austrians at the battle of Magenta (4 June 1859) and at the Battle of Solferino (24 June). Legion losses were significant and the 2nd Foreign Regiment lost Colonel Chabrière, its commanding officer. In gratitude, the city of Milan awarded, in 1909, the "commemorative medal of deliverance", which still adorns the regimental flags of the Second Regiment.

=== Mexican Expedition 1863–1867 ===
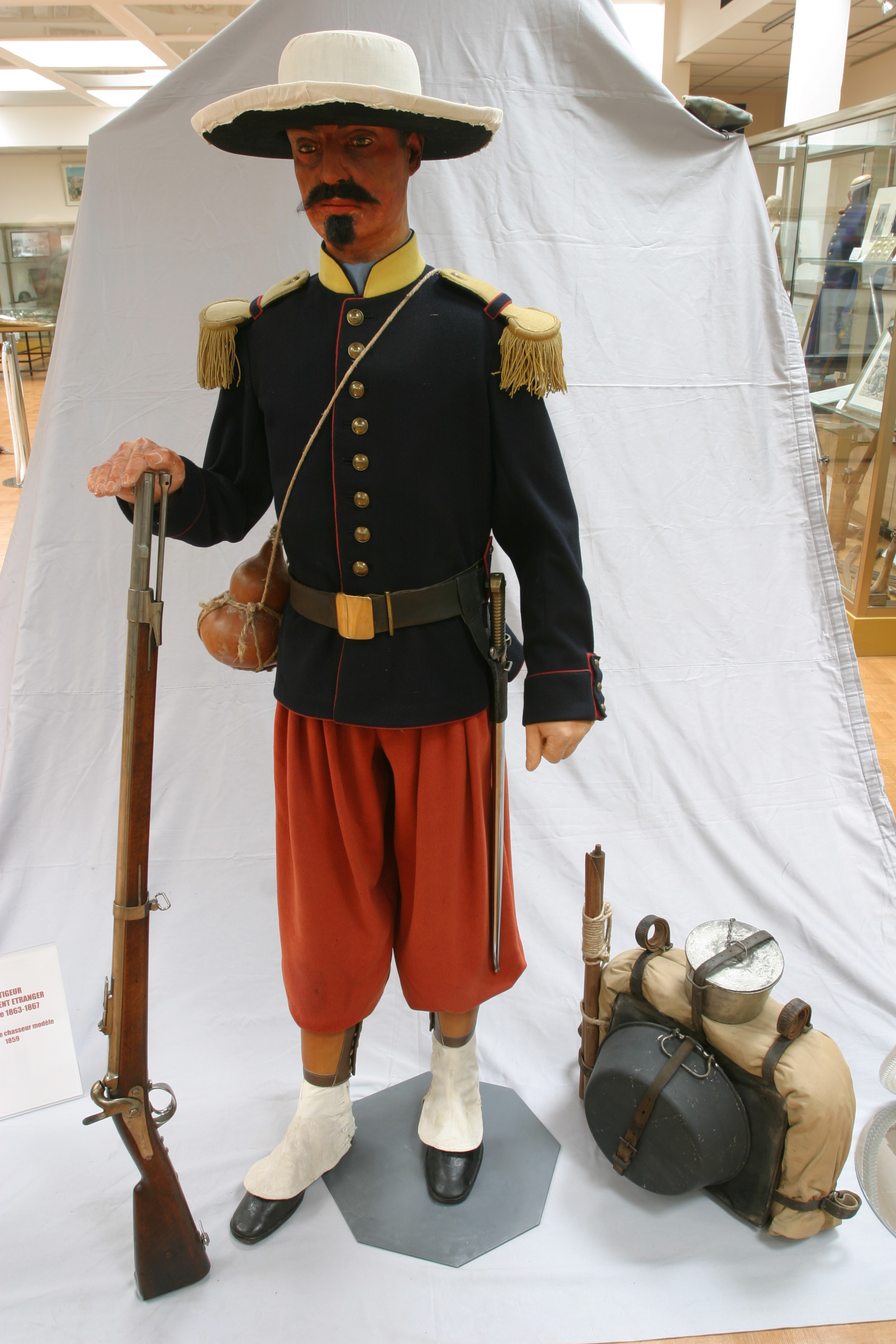
Uniform of a legionnaire during the 1863 Mexican campaign

The 38,000 strong French expeditionary force dispatched to Mexico via sea between 1862 and 1863 included two battalions of the Foreign Legion, increased to six battalions by 1866. Small cavalry and artillery units were raised from legionnaires serving in Mexico. The original intention was that Foreign Legion units should remain in Mexico for up to six years to provide a core for the Imperial Mexican Army. However the Legion was withdrawn with the other French forces during February–March 1867.

It was in Mexico on 30 April 1863 that the Legion earned its legendary status. A company led by Captain Jean Danjou, numbering 62 Legionnaires and 3 Legion officers, was escorting a convoy to the besieged city of Puebla when it was attacked and besieged by three thousand Mexican loyalists, organised in two battalions of infantry and cavalry, numbering 2,200 and 800 respectively. The Legion detachment under Danjou, Sous-Lieutenant Jean Vilain, and Sous-Lieutenant Clément Maudet made a stand in the Hacienda de la Trinidad – a farm near the village of Camarone. When only six survivors remained, out of ammunition, a bayonet assault was launched in which three of the six were killed. The remaining three wounded men were brought before the Mexican commander Colonel Milán, who allowed them to return to the French lines as an honor guard for the body of Danjou. The captain had a wooden hand, which was later returned to the Legion and is now kept in a case in the Legion Museum at Aubagne and paraded annually on Camerone Day. It is the Foreign Legion's most precious relic.

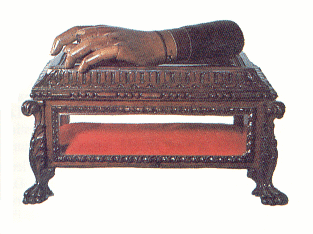
Jean Danjou's prosthetic wooden hand

During the Mexican Campaign, 6,654 French died. Of these, 1,918 were from a single regiment of the Legion.

=== Franco-Prussian War 1870 ===
According to French law, the Foreign Legion was not to be used within Metropolitan France except in the case of a national invasion, and was consequently not a part of Napoleon III's Imperial Army that capitulated at Sedan. With the defeat of the Imperial Army, the Second French Empire fell and the Third Republic was created.

The new Third Republic was desperately short of trained soldiers following Sedan, so the Foreign Legion was ordered to provide a contingent. On 11 October 1870 two provisional battalions disembarked via sea at Toulon, the first time the Foreign Legion had been deployed in France itself. It attempted to lift the Siege of Paris by breaking through the German lines. It succeeded in retaking Orléans, but failed to break the siege. In January 1871, France capitulated but civil war soon broke out, which led to revolution and the short-lived Paris Commune. The Foreign Legion participated in the suppression of the Commune, which was crushed with great bloodshed.

=== Conquest of Northern Vietnam and Sino-French War 1883–1888 ===
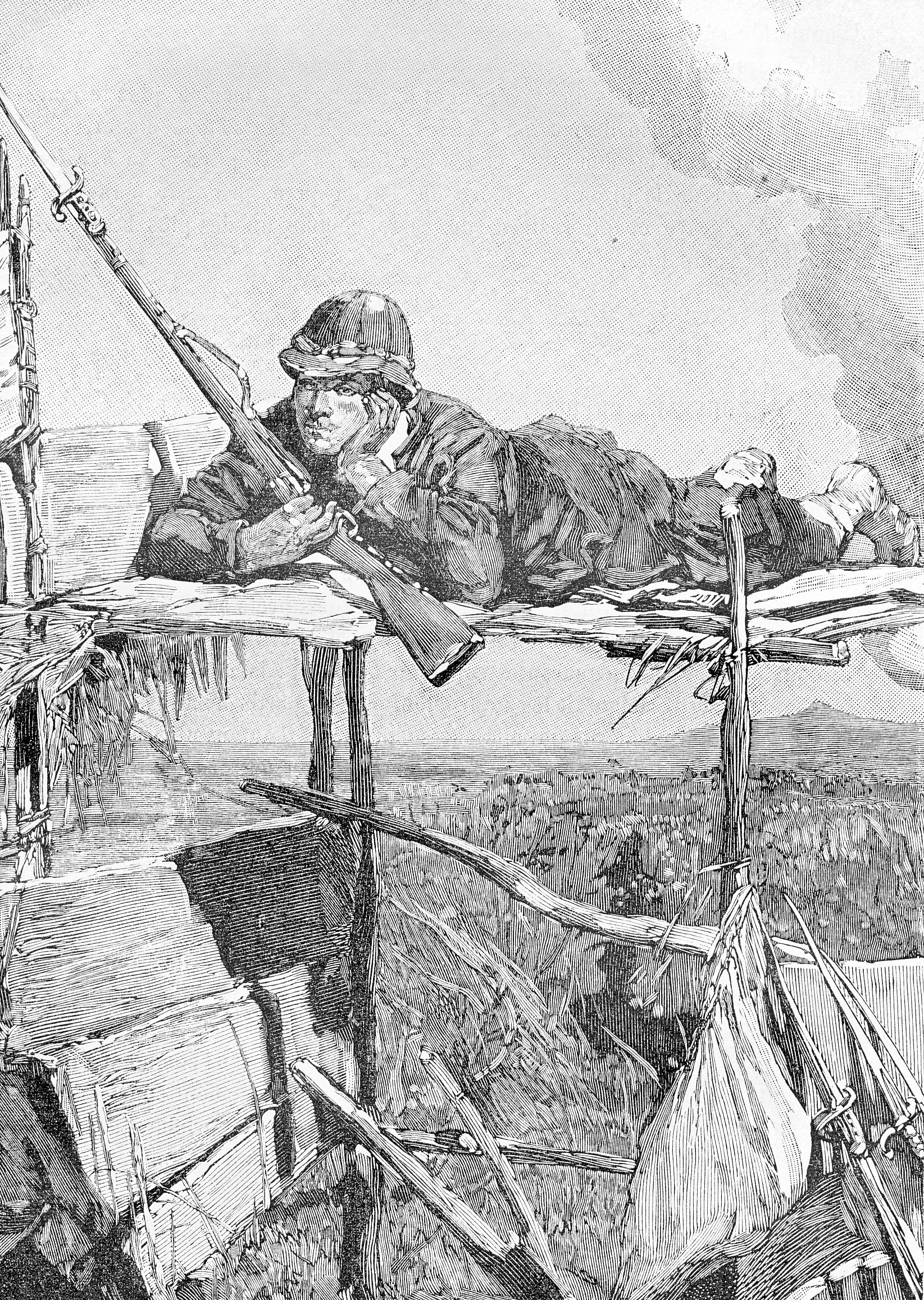
A Legionnaire sniper at Tuyên Quang

The Foreign Legion's First Battalion (Lieutenant-Colonel Donnier) sailed to Tonkin in late 1883, during the period of undeclared hostilities that preceded the Sino-French War (August 1884 to April 1885), and formed part of the attack column that stormed the western gate of Sơn Tây on 16 December. The Second and Third Infantry Battalions (chef de bataillon Diguet and Lieutenant-Colonel Schoeffer) were also deployed to Tonkin shortly afterwards, and were present in all the major campaigns of the Sino-French War. Two Foreign Legion companies led the defence at the celebrated Siege of Tuyên Quang (24 November 1884 to 3 March 1885). In January 1885 the Foreign Legion's 4th Battalion (chef de bataillon Vitalis) was deployed to the French bridgehead at Keelung (Jilong) in Formosa (Taiwan), where it took part in the later battles of the Keelung Campaign. The battalion played an important role in Colonel Jacques Duchesne's offensive in March 1885 that captured the key Chinese positions of La Table and Fort Bamboo and disengaged Keelung.

In December 1883, during a review of the Second Legion Battalion on the eve of its departure for Tonkin to take part in the Bắc Ninh Campaign, General François de Négrier pronounced a famous mot: Vous, légionnaires, vous êtes soldats pour mourir, et je vous envoie où l'on meurt! ('You, Legionnaires, you are soldiers in order to die, and I'm sending you to where one dies!')

=== Colonization of Africa ===
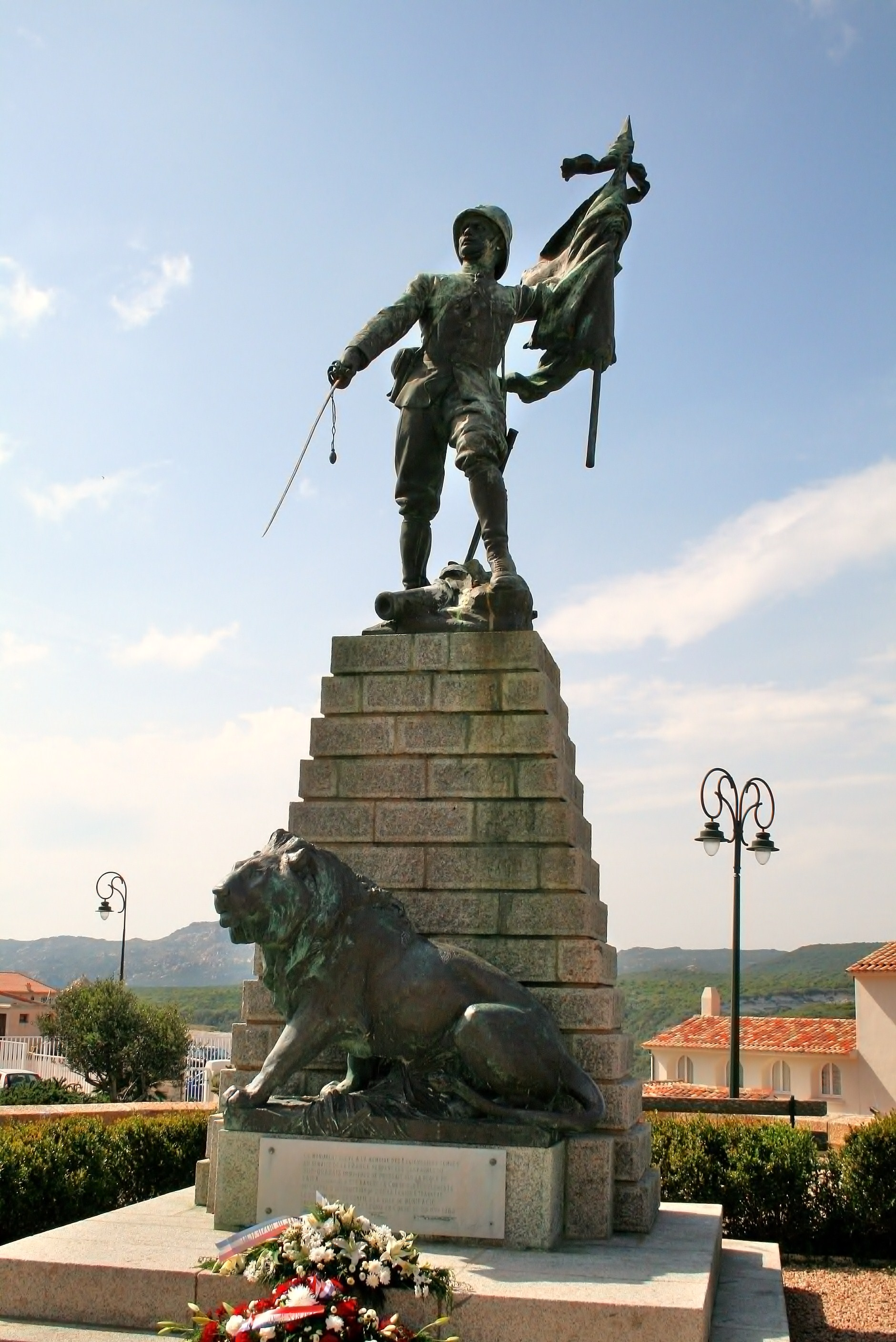
Monument commemorating the soldiers of the Foreign Legion killed on duty during the South-Oranese campaign (1897–1902).

As part of the Army of Africa, the Foreign Legion contributed to the expansion of the French colonial empire in Sub-Saharan Africa. Simultaneously, the Legion took part to the pacification of Algeria, suppressing various tribal rebellions and razzias.

==== Second Franco-Dahomean War 1892–1894 ====
In 1892, King Béhanzin ordered his soldiers to attack villages near Grand Popo and Porto-Novo (in modern-day Benin) in an effort to reassert the older boundaries of Dahomey. King Béhanzin rejected complaints by the French, who proceeded to declare war.

A battalion, led by commandant Faurax Montier, was formed from two companies of the First Foreign Regiment and two others from the second regiment. From Cotonou, the legionnaires marched to seize Abomey, the capital of the Kingdom of Dahomey. Two and a half months were needed to reach the city, at the cost of repeated battles against the Dahomean warriors, especially the Amazons of the King. King Behanzin surrendered and was captured by the legionnaires in January 1894.

==== Second Madagascar Expedition 1894–1895 ====
In 1895, a battalion formed by the First and Second Foreign Regiments was sent to the Kingdom of Madagascar as part of an expeditionary force whose mission was to conquer the island. The foreign battalion formed the backbone of the column launched on Antananarivo, the capital of Madagascar. After a few skirmishes, Queen Ranavalona III promptly surrendered. The Foreign Legion lost 226 men, only a tenth of whom died during actual combat. Others, like much of the expeditionary force, died from tropical diseases. Despite the success of the expedition, the quelling of sporadic rebellions would take another eight years until 1905, when the island was completely pacified by the French under Joseph Gallieni. During that time, insurrections against the Malagasy Christians of the island, missionaries and foreigners were particularly terrible. Queen Ranavalona III was deposed in January 1897 and was exiled to Algiers in Algeria, where she died in 1917.

==== Mandingo War 1898 ====
From 1882 until his capture, Samori Ture, ruler of the Wassoulou Empire, fought the French colonial army, defeating them on several occasions, including a notable victory at Woyowayanko (2 April 1882), in the face of French heavy artillery. Nonetheless, Samori was forced to sign several treaties ceding territory to the French between 1886 and 1889. Samori began a steady retreat, but the fall of other resistance armies, particularly Babemba Traoré at Sikasso, permitted the colonial army to launch a concentrated assault against his forces. A battalion of two companies from the 2nd Foreign Regiment was created in early 1894 to pacify the Niger. The Legionnaires' victory at the fortress of Ouilla and police patrols in the region accelerated the submission of the tribes. On 29 September 1898, Samori Ture was captured by the French Commandant Gouraud and exiled to Gabon, marking the end of the Wassoulou Empire.

=== Marching Regiments of the Foreign Legion ===
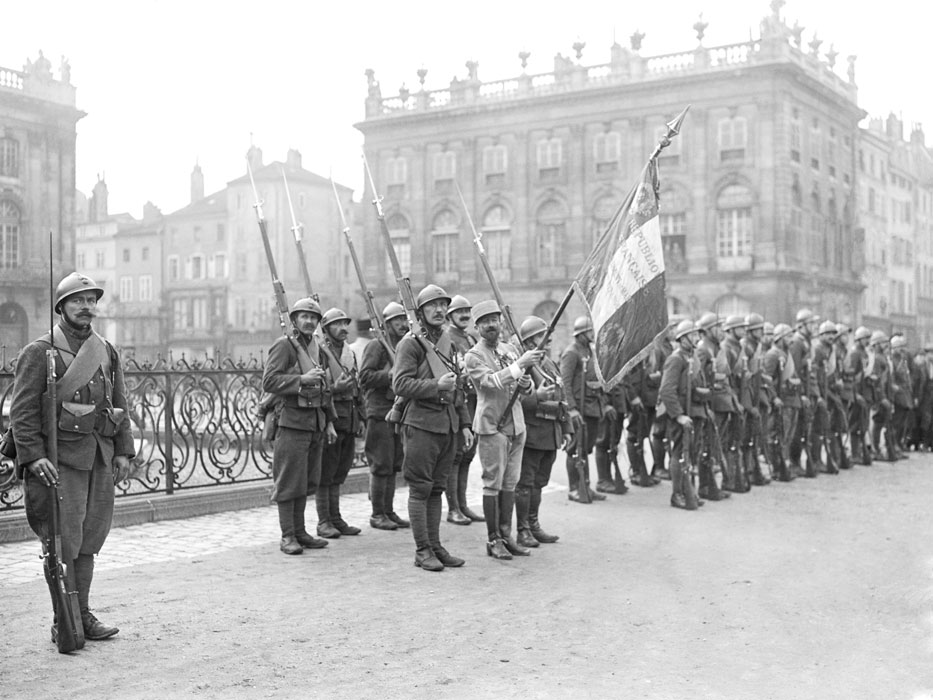
Review of the Marching Regiment of the Foreign Legion, RMLE at the end of November 1918

==== World War I 1914–1918 ====
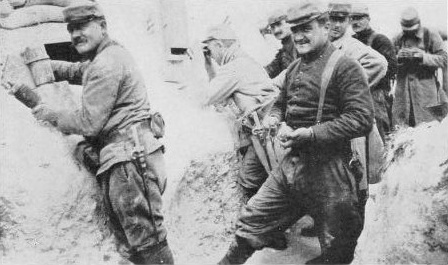
Americans in the Foreign Legion, 1916

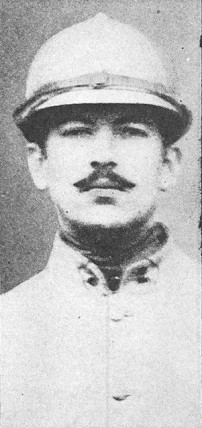
American poet Alan Seeger (1888–1916), in his Marching Regiment uniform

The annexation of Alsace and Lorraine by Germany in 1871 led to numerous volunteers from the two regions enlisting in the Foreign Legion, which gave them the option of French citizenship at the end of their service.

With the declaration of war on 29 July 1914, a call was made for foreigners residing in France to support their adopted country. While many would have preferred direct enlistment in the regular French Army, the only option immediately available was that of the Foreign Legion. On 3 August 1914 a reported 8,000 volunteers applied to enlist in the Paris recruiting office of the Legion.

In World War I, the Foreign Legion fought in many critical battles on the Western Front, including Artois, Champagne, Somme, Aisne, and Verdun (in 1917), and also suffered heavy casualties during 1918. The Foreign Legion was also in the Dardanelles and Macedonian front, and was highly decorated for its efforts. Many young foreigners volunteered for the Foreign Legion when the war broke out in 1914. There were marked differences between the idealistic volunteers of 1914 and the hardened men of the old Legion, making assimilation difficult. Nevertheless, the old and the new men of the Foreign Legion fought and died in vicious battles on the Western front, including Belloy-en-Santerre during the Battle of the Somme, where the poet Alan Seeger, after being mortally wounded by machine-gun fire, cheered on the rest of his advancing battalion.

==== Interwar period 1918–1939 ====
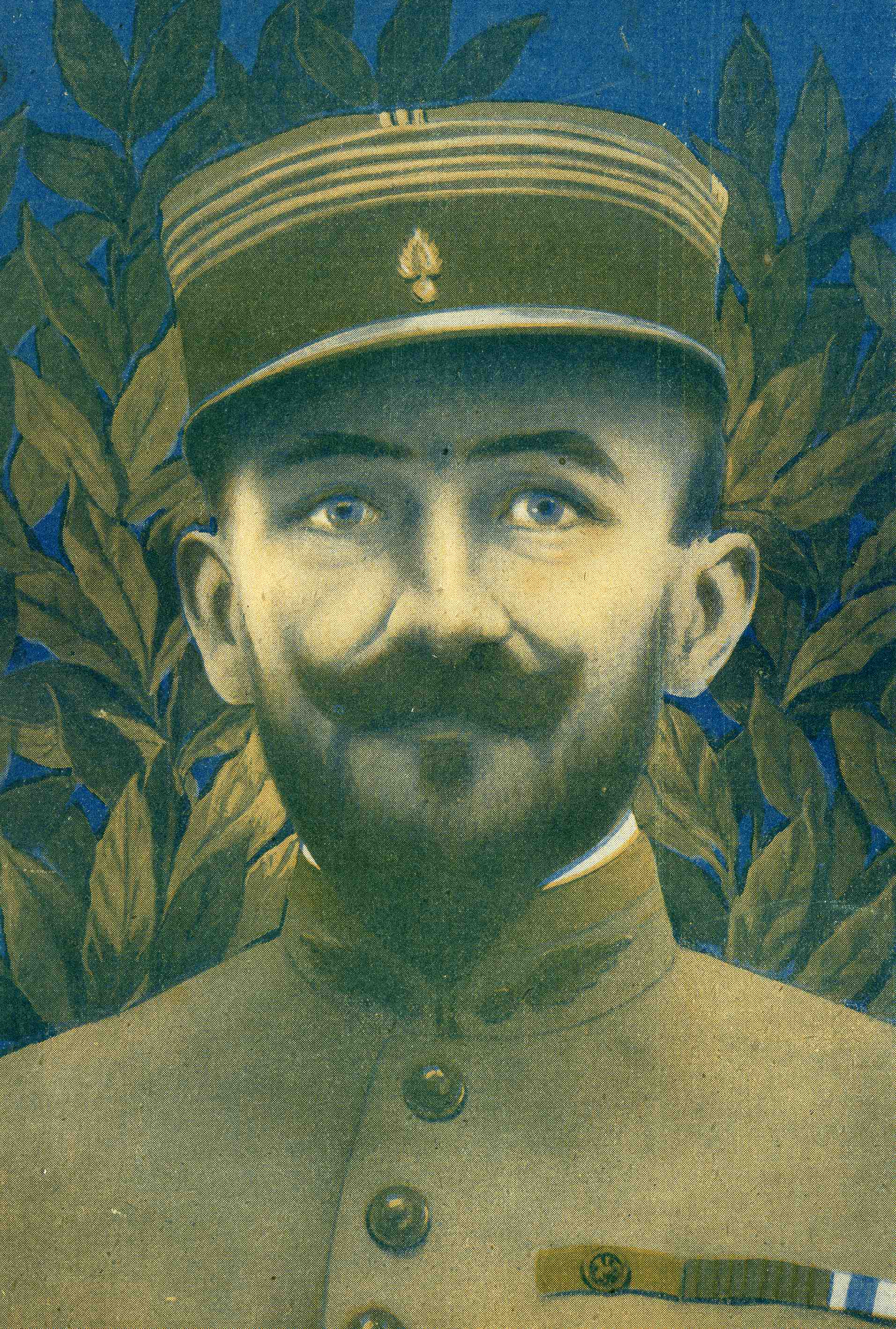
Paul-Frédéric Rollet (1875–1941) The Father of the Legion

While suffering heavy casualties on the Western Front the Legion had emerged from World War I with an enhanced reputation and as one of the most highly decorated units in the French Army. In 1919, the government of Spain raised the Spanish Foreign Legion and modeled it after the French Foreign Legion. General Jean Mordacq intended to rebuild the Foreign Legion as a larger military formation, doing away with the Legion's traditional role as a solely infantry formation. General Mordacq envisioned a Foreign Legion consisting not of regiments, but of divisions with cavalry, engineer, and artillery regiments in addition to the Legion's infantry mainstay. In 1920, decrees ordained the establishment of regiments of cavalry and artillery. Immediately following the armistice the Foreign Legion experienced an increase of enlistments. The Foreign Legion began the process of reorganizing and redeploying to Algeria.

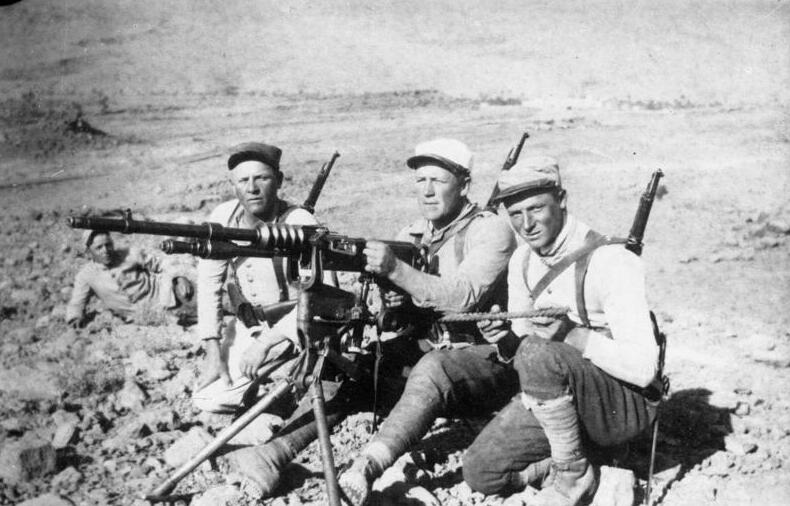
Legionnaires in Morocco, c. 1920

The Legion played a major part in the Rif War of 1920–1925. In 1932, the Foreign Legion consisted of 30,000 men, serving in six multi-battalion regiments including the 1st Foreign Infantry Regiment 1^{er} REI – Algeria, Syria and Lebanon; 2nd Foreign Infantry Regiment 2^{ème} REI, 3rd Foreign Infantry Regiment 3^{ème} REI, and 4th Foreign Infantry Regiment 4^{ème} REI – Morocco, Lebanon; 5th Foreign Infantry 5^{ème} REI – Indochina; and 1st Foreign Cavalry Regiment 1^{er} REC – Lebanon, Tunisia and Morocco. In 1931, Général Paul-Frédéric Rollet assumed the role of 1st Inspector of the Foreign Legion, a post created at his initiative. While serving as colonel of the 1st Foreign Infantry Regiment (1925–1931), Rollet was responsible for planning the centennial celebrations of the Legion's foundation; scheduling this event for Camarón Day 30 April 1931. He was subsequently credited with creating much of the modern mystique of the Legion by restoring or creating many of its traditions.

==== World War II 1939–1945 ====
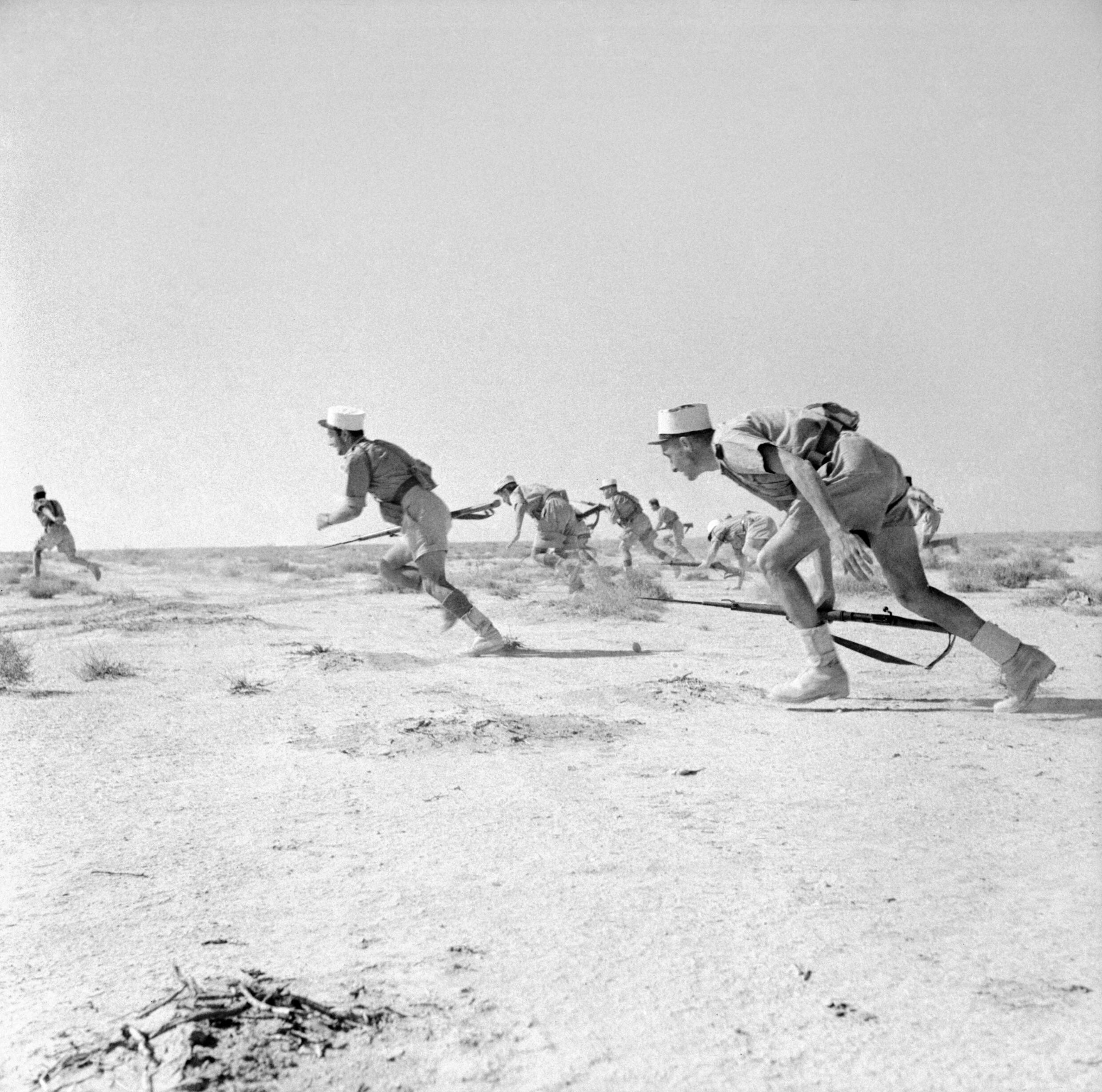
Free French Legionnaires assaulting an Axis strong point at the battle of Bir Hakeim, 1942

The Foreign Legion played a smaller role in World War II in mainland Europe than in World War I, though it saw involvement in many exterior theatres of operations, notably sea-transport protection through to the Norwegian, Syria–Lebanon, and North African campaigns. The 13th Demi-Brigade, formed for service in Norway, found itself in the UK at the time of the French Armistice (June 1940), was deployed to the British 8th Army in North Africa and distinguished itself in the Battle of Bir Hakeim (1942). Reflecting the divisions of the time, part of the Foreign Legion joined the Free French movement while another part served the Vichy government. Germany incorporated German legionnaires into the Wehrmacht's 90th Light Infantry Division in North Africa.

The Syria–Lebanon Campaign of June 1941 saw legionnaire fighting legionnaire as the 13^{e} D.B.L.E clashed with the 6th Foreign Infantry Regiment 6^{e} REI at Damascus. Nevertheless, many legionnaires of the 6th Foreign Infantry Regiment 6^{e} (dissolved on 31 December 1941) integrated into the Marching Regiment of the Foreign Legion R.M.L.E in 1942. Later, a thousand of the rank-and-file of the Vichy Legion unit joined the 13^{e} D.B.L.E. of the Free French forces which were also part (as of September 1944) of Jean de Lattre de Tassigny's successful amalgam of the French Liberation Army (French: Armée française de la Libération), the (400,000 men) amalgam consisted of the Armistice Army, the Free French Forces and the French Forces of the Interior which formed Army B and later became part of the French 1st Army with forces also issued from the French Resistance.

==== Alsace-Lorraine ====
Following World War II, many French-speaking former German soldiers joined the Foreign Legion to pursue a military career, an option no longer possible in Germany, including French German soldiers of Malgré-nous. It would have been considered problematic if the men from Alsace-Lorraine had not spoken French. These French-speaking former German soldiers made up as much as 60 percent of the Legion during the war in Indochina. Contrary to popular belief however, French policy was to exclude former members of the Waffen-SS, and candidates for induction were refused if they exhibited the tell-tale blood type tattoo, or even a scar that might be masking it.

The high percentage of Germans was contrary to normal policy concerning a single dominant nationality, and in more recent times Germans have made up a much smaller percentage of the Foreign Legion's composition.

=== First Indochina War 1946–1954 ===
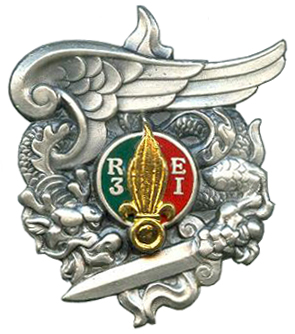
Parachute company of the 3rd Foreign Infantry Regiment

During the First Indochina War (1946–1954) the Foreign Legion saw its numbers swell due to the incorporation of World War II veterans. Although the Foreign Legion distinguished itself in a territory where it had served since the 1880s, it also suffered a heavy toll during this war. Some of the legionnaires, such as Stefan Kubiak, deserted and began fighting for the Việt Minh upon witnessing torture of Vietnamese peasants at the hands of French troops. Constantly being deployed in operations, units of the Legion suffered particularly heavy losses in the climactic Battle of Dien Bien Phu, before the fortified valley finally fell on 7 May 1954.

No fewer than 72,833 served in Indochina during the eight-year war. The Legion suffered the loss of 10,283 of its own men in combat: 309 officers, 1082 sous-officiers and 9092 legionnaires. While only one of several Legion units involved in Indochina, the 1st Foreign Parachute Battalion (1^{er} BEP) particularly distinguished itself, while being annihilated twice. It was renamed the 1st Foreign Parachute Regiment (1^{er} REP) after its third reformation.

The 1^{er} BEP sailed to Indochina on 12 November 1948 and was then engaged in combat operations in Tonkin. On 17 November 1950 the battalion parachuted into That Khé and suffered heavy losses at Coc Xa, during the battle of Route Coloniale 4. Reconstituted on 1 March 1951, the battalion participated in combat operations at Cho Ben, on the Black River and in Annam. On 21 November 1953 the reconstituted 1^{er} BEP was parachuted into Dien Bien Phu. In this battle, the unit lost 575 killed and missing. Reconstituted for the third time on 19 May 1954, the battalion left Indochina on 8 February 1955. The 1^{er} BEP received five citations and the fourragère of the colors of the Médaille militaire for its service in Indochina. The 1^{er} BEP became the 1st Foreign Parachute Regiment (1^{er} REP) in Algeria on 1 September 1955.

Dien Bien Phu fell on 7 May 1954 at 17:30. The couple of hectares that were the battlefield today are corn fields surrounding a stele which commemorates the sacrifices of those who died there. While the garrison of Dien Bien Phu included French regular, North African, and locally recruited (Indochinese) units, the battle has become associated particularly with the paratroops of the Foreign Legion.

During the Indochina War, the Legion operated several armoured trains which were an enduring Rolling Symbol during the chartered course duration of French Indochina. The Legion also operated various Passage Companies relative to the continental conflicts at hand.

=== Algerian War 1954–1962 ===
==== Foreign Legion paratroops ====
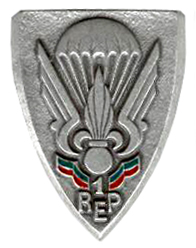
1st Foreign Parachute Regiment formed and commanded by Legion Lieutenant Colonel Pierre Paul Jeanpierre (1912–1958)

The Legion was heavily engaged in fighting against the National Liberation Front and the Armée de Libération Nationale (ALN). The main activity during the period 1954–1962 was as part of the operations of the 10th Parachute Division and 25th Parachute Division. The 1st Foreign Parachute Regiment, 1^{er} REP, was under the command of the 10th Parachute Division (France), 10^{ème} DP, and the 2nd Foreign Parachute Regiment, 2^{ème} REP, was under the command of the 25th Parachute Division (France), 25^{ème} DP. While both the 1st Foreign Parachute Regiment (1^{er} REP), and the 2nd Foreign Parachute Regiment (2^{ème} REP), were part of the operations of French parachute divisions (10^{ème} DP and 25^{ème} DP established in 1956), the Legion's 1st Foreign Parachute Regiment (1^{er} REP), and the Legion's 2nd Foreign Parachute Regiment (2^{ème} REP), are older than the French divisions. The 1^{er} REP was the former thrice-reconstituted 1st Foreign Parachute Battalion (1^{er} BEP) and the 2^{ème} REP was the former 2nd Foreign Parachute Battalion (2^{ème} BEP). Both battalions were renamed and their Legionnaires transferred from Indochina on 1 August 1954 to Algeria by 1 November 1954. Both traced their origins to the Parachute Company of the 3rd Foreign Infantry Regiment commanded by Legion Lieutenant Jacques Morin attached to the III/1^{er} R.C.P.

With the start of the War in Algeria on 1 November 1954, the two foreign participating parachute battalions back from Indochina, the 1st Foreign Parachute Battalion (1^{er} BEP, III Formation) and the 2nd Foreign Parachute Battalion (2^{ème} BEP), were not part of any French parachute divisions yet and were not designated as regiments until September and 1 December 1955 respectively.

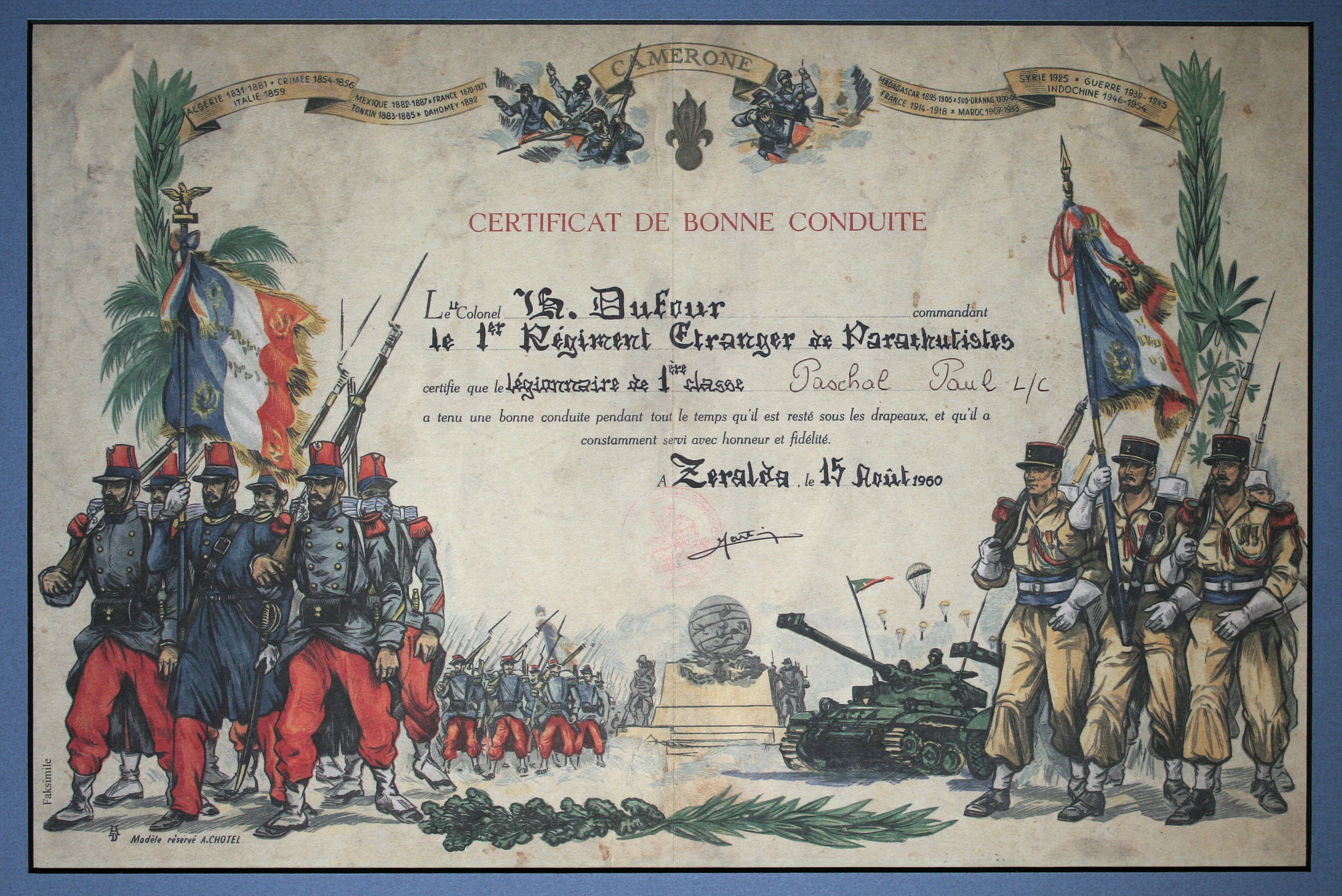
Good Conduct Certificate, Lt Col Paul Paschal (1919–1994), 1er REP, 15 August 1960

Main operations during the Algerian War included the Battle of Algiers and the Bataille of the Frontiers, fought by 60,000 soldiers including French and Legion paratroopers. For paratroopers of the Legion, the 1st Foreign Parachute Regiment (1^{er} REP) and 2nd Foreign Parachute Regiment (2^{ème} REP), were the only known foreign active parachute regiments, exclusively commanded by Pierre Paul Jeanpierre for the 1^{er} REP and the paratrooper commanders of the 2^{ème} REP. The remainder of French paratrooper units of the French Armed Forces were commanded by Jacques Massu, Buchond, Marcel Bigeard, Paul Aussaresses. Other Legion offensives in the mountains in 1959 included operations Jumelles, Cigales, and Ariège in the Aures and the last in Kabylie.

The image of the Legion as a professional and non-political force was tarnished when the elite 1st Foreign Parachute Regiment 1^{er} REP, which was also part of the 10th Parachute Division played a leading role in the generals' putsch of 1961 and was subsequently disbanded.

==== Generals' putsch and reduction of Foreign Legion ====
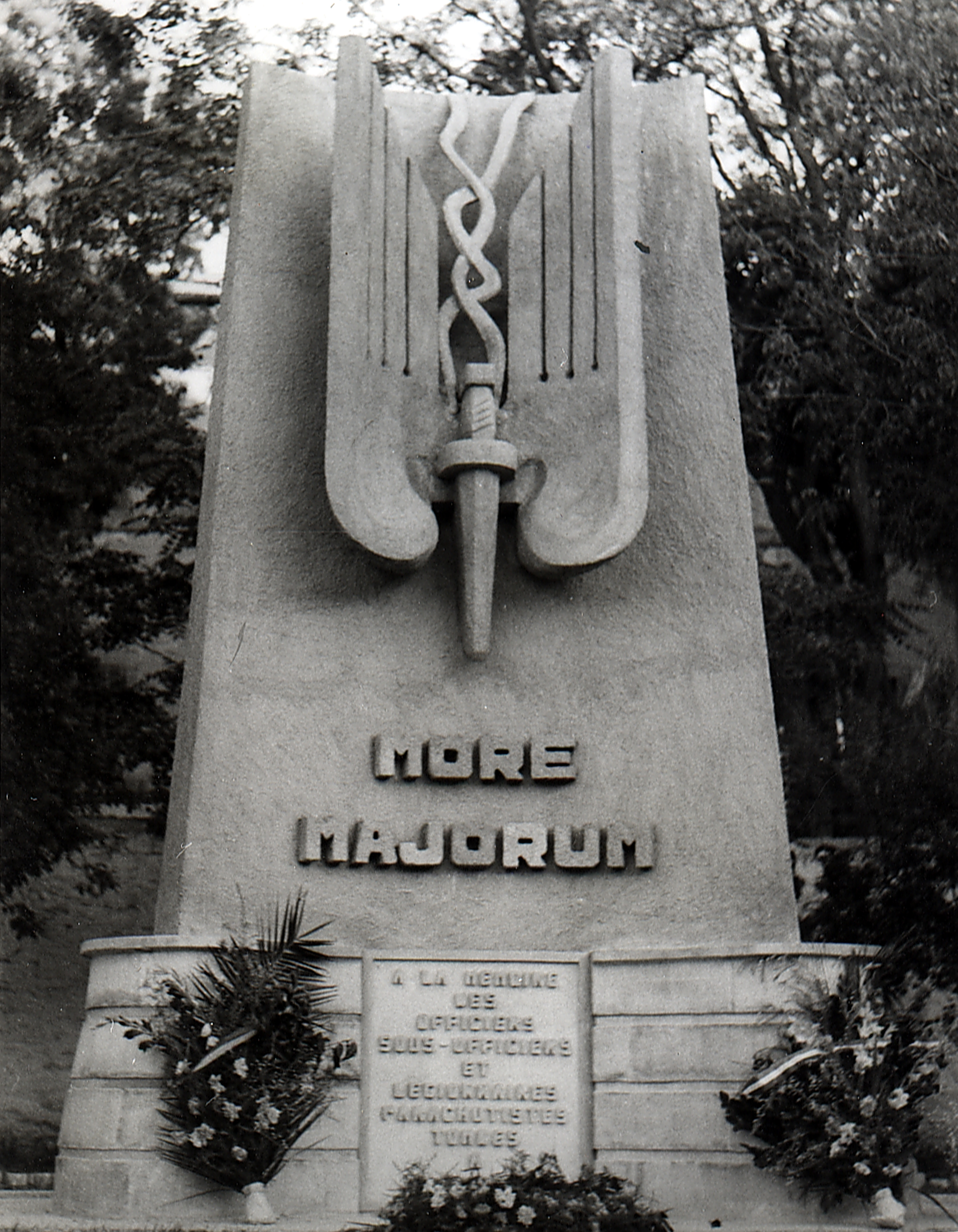
Marche ou Crève and More Majorum for Legion Officers, Sous-Officiers and Legionnaires of the CEPs, BEPs and REPs of the Legion

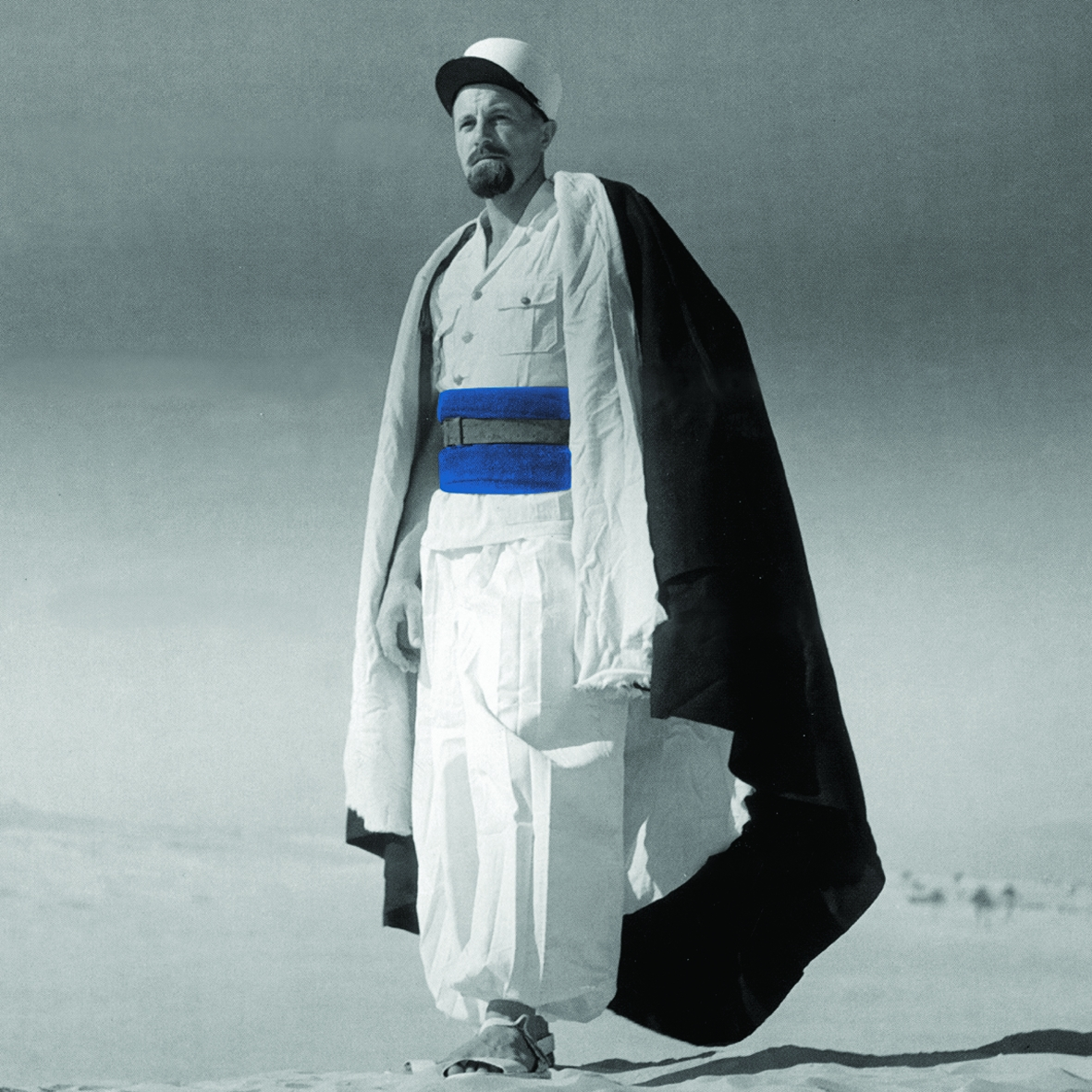
Tenue of a Legionnaire of the Saharan Mounted Companies of the Foreign Legion (CSPLE). Often blue or red and worn by all the soldiers of the Army of Africa; the Legion however, officially adopted the Ceinture Bleue (blue sash) in 1882.

Coming out of a difficult Indochinese conflict, the Foreign Legion reinforced cohesion by extending the duration of basic training. Efforts exerted were successful during this transit; however, entering into December 1960 and the generals' putsch, a crisis hit the legion putting its faith at the corps of the Army.

For having rallied to the generals' putsch of April 1961, the 1st Foreign Parachute Regiment of the 10th Parachute Division was dissolved on 30 April 1961 at Zeralda.

In 1961, at the issue of the putsch, the 1st Mounted Saharan Squadron of the Foreign Legion (French: 1^{er} Escadron Saharien Porté de la Légion Etrangère, 1^{er} ESPLE) received the missions to assure surveillance and policing.

The independence of Algeria from the French in 1962 was traumatising since it ended with the enforced abandonment of the barracks command center at Sidi Bel Abbès established in 1842. Upon being notified that the elite regiment was to be disbanded and that they were to be reassigned, legionnaires of the 1^{er} REP burned the Chinese pavilion acquired following the Siege of Tuyên Quang in 1884. The relics from the Legion's history museum, including the wooden hand of Captain Jean Danjou, subsequently accompanied the Legion to France. Also removed from Sidi Bel Abbès were the symbolic Legion remains of General Paul-Frédéric Rollet (The Father of the Legion), Legion officer Prince Count Aage of Rosenborg, and Legionnaire Heinz Zimmermann (last fatal casualty in Algeria).

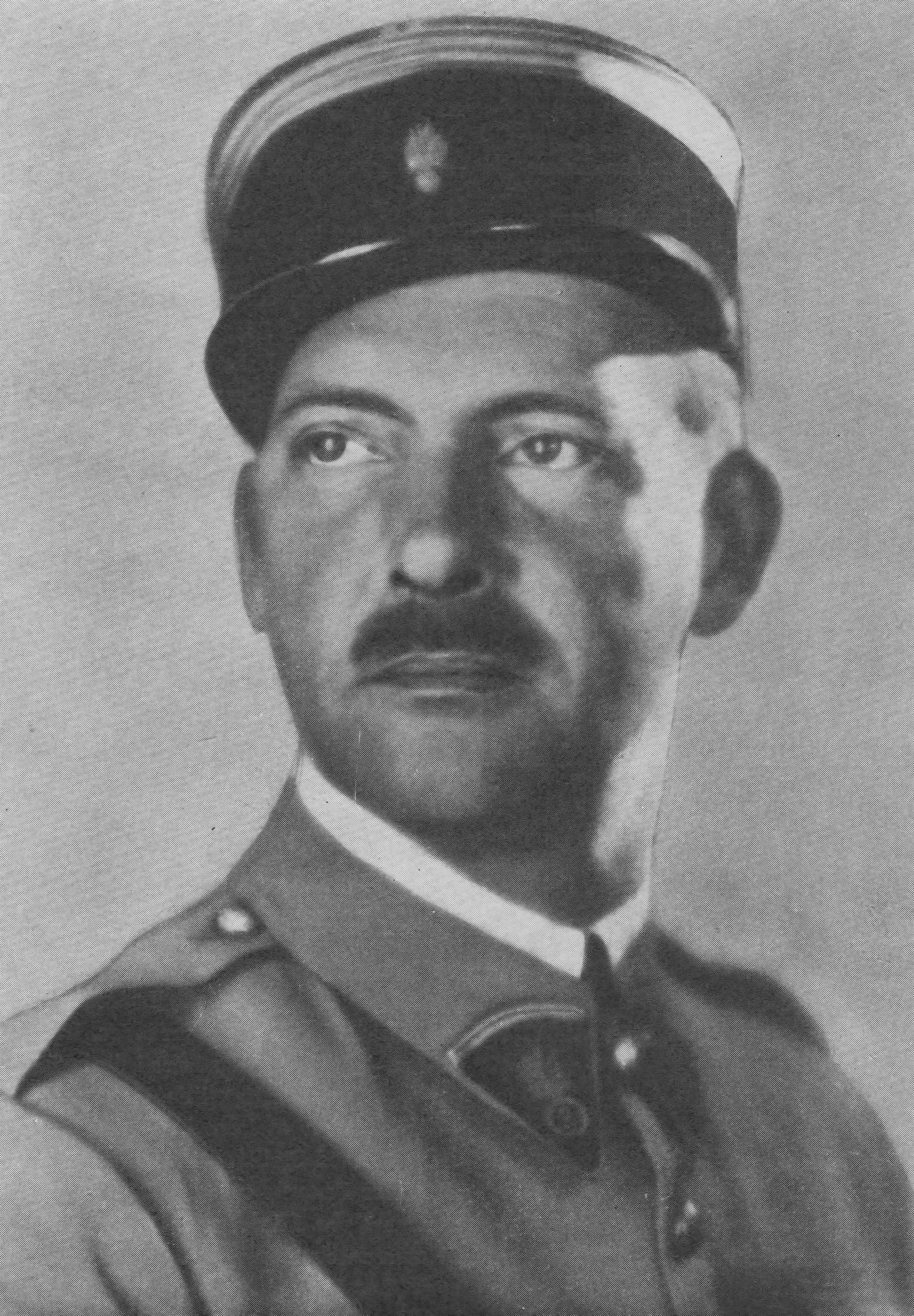
Legion Officer Lieutenant-colonel Prince Count Aage of Rosenborg (1887–1940)

The Legion acquired its parade song "Non, je ne regrette rien" ("No, I regret nothing"), a 1960 Édith Piaf song sung by Sous-Officiers and legionnaires as they left their barracks for re-deployment following the Algiers putsch of 1961. The song has remained a part of Legion heritage since.

The 1st Foreign Parachute Regiment 1^{er} REP was disbanded on 30 April 1961. However, the 2nd Foreign Parachute Regiment 2^{ème} REP prevailed in existence, while most of the personnel of the Saharan Companies were integrated into the 1st Foreign Infantry Regiment, 2nd Foreign Infantry Regiment and 4th Foreign Infantry Regiment respectively.

=== Post-colonial Africa ===
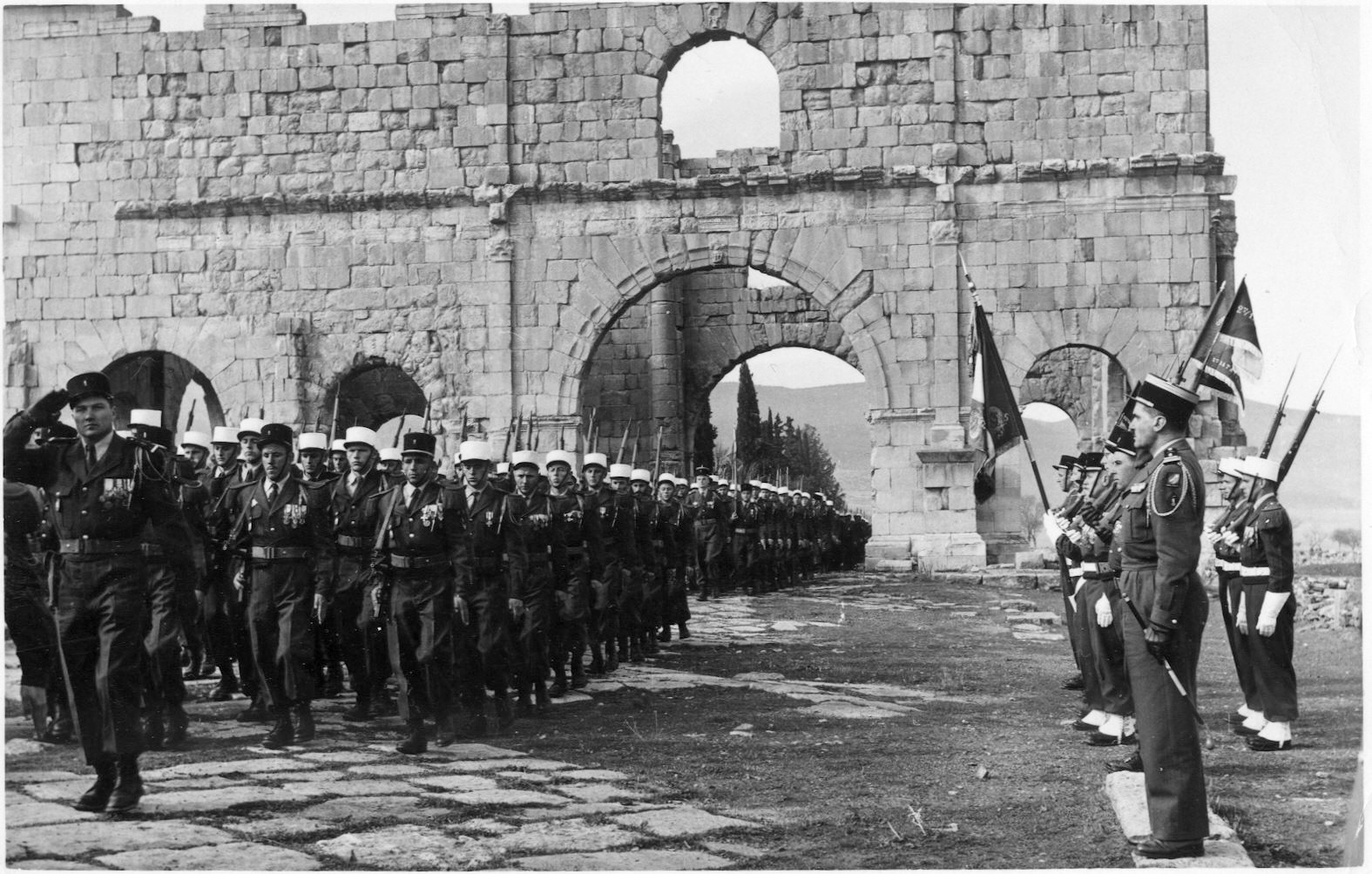
The 13th Demi-Brigade of the Foreign Legion parading through Roman ruins in Lambaesis, Algeria (c. 1958)

By the mid-1960s the Legion had lost its traditional and spiritual home in French Algeria and elite units had been dissolved. President de Gaulle considered disbanding it altogether but, being reminded of the Marching Regiments, and that the 13th Demi-Brigade was one of the first units to declare for him in 1940 and taking also into consideration the effective service of various Saharan units and performances of other Legions units, he chose instead to downsize the Legion from 40,000 to 8,000 men and relocate it to metropolitan France. Legion units continued to be assigned to overseas service, although not in North Africa.

=== 1962–present ===
In the early 1960s, and besides ongoing global rapid deployments, the Legion also stationed forces on various continents while operating different function units.

The main Disciplinary Company of the Foreign Legion (CDLE), based on rules and regulations set by général Rollet in 1931, received serious offenders sent from Legion regiments garrisoned or operating in Algeria, Morocco, Tunisia, the Levant and Tonkin (special section of the 5th Foreign Infantry Regiment and later in 1963, part of a Saharan disciplinary section unit of the 5e REI and 2nd Foreign Infantry Regiment). It was dissolved on July 1, 1964.

From 1965 to 1967, the Legion operated several companies, including the 5th Heavy Weight Transport Company (CTGP), mainly in charge of evacuating the Sahara. The area of responsibility of some of these units extended from the confines of the in-between of the Sahara to the Mediterranean. Ongoing interventions and rapid deployments two years later and the following years included in part:

- 1969–1971 : Interventions in Chad
- 1978–present : Peacekeeping operations around the Mediterranean, including the United Nations Interim Force in Lebanon during the Global War on Terror
- 1978–1978 : Battle of Kolwezi (Zaïre)
- 1981–1984 : Peacekeeping operations in Lebanon at the corps of the United Nations Multinational Force during the Lebanese Civil War along with the 31^{ème} Brigade which included the 1st Foreign Regiment 1^{er} RE. Operation Épaulard I was spearheaded by Lieutenant-colonel Bernard Janvier. The Multinational Force also included the British Armed Forces 1st The Queen's Dragoon Guards, U.S. American contingents of United States Marine Corps and the United States Navy, the French Navy and 28 exclusive French Armed Forces regiments including French paratroopers regiments, companies, units of the 11th Parachute Brigade along with the 2nd Foreign Parachute Regiment 2^{e} REP. The multinational force also included the Irish Armed Forces and units of the French National Gendarmerie, Italian paratroopers from the Folgore Brigade, and infantry units from the Bersaglieri regiments and Marines of the San Marco Battalion.

==== Gulf War 1990–1991 ====
The 6th Light Armoured Division operating the left flank of the 34 nations coalition during the Gulf War

In September 1990, the 1st Foreign Regiment, the 1st Foreign Cavalry Regiment, the 2nd Foreign Parachute Regiment, the 2nd Foreign Infantry Regiment, and the 6th Foreign Engineer Regiment were sent to the Persian Gulf as a part of Opération Daguet along with the 1st Spahi Regiment, the 11th Marine Artillery Regiment, the 3rd Marine Infantry Regiment, the 21st Marine Infantry Regiment, the French Army Light Aviation, the Régiment d'infanterie-chars de marine, and components of the 35th Parachute Artillery Regiment, the 1st Parachute Hussard Regiment, and the 17th Parachute Engineer Regiment. Division Daguet was commanded by Général de brigade Bernard Janvier.

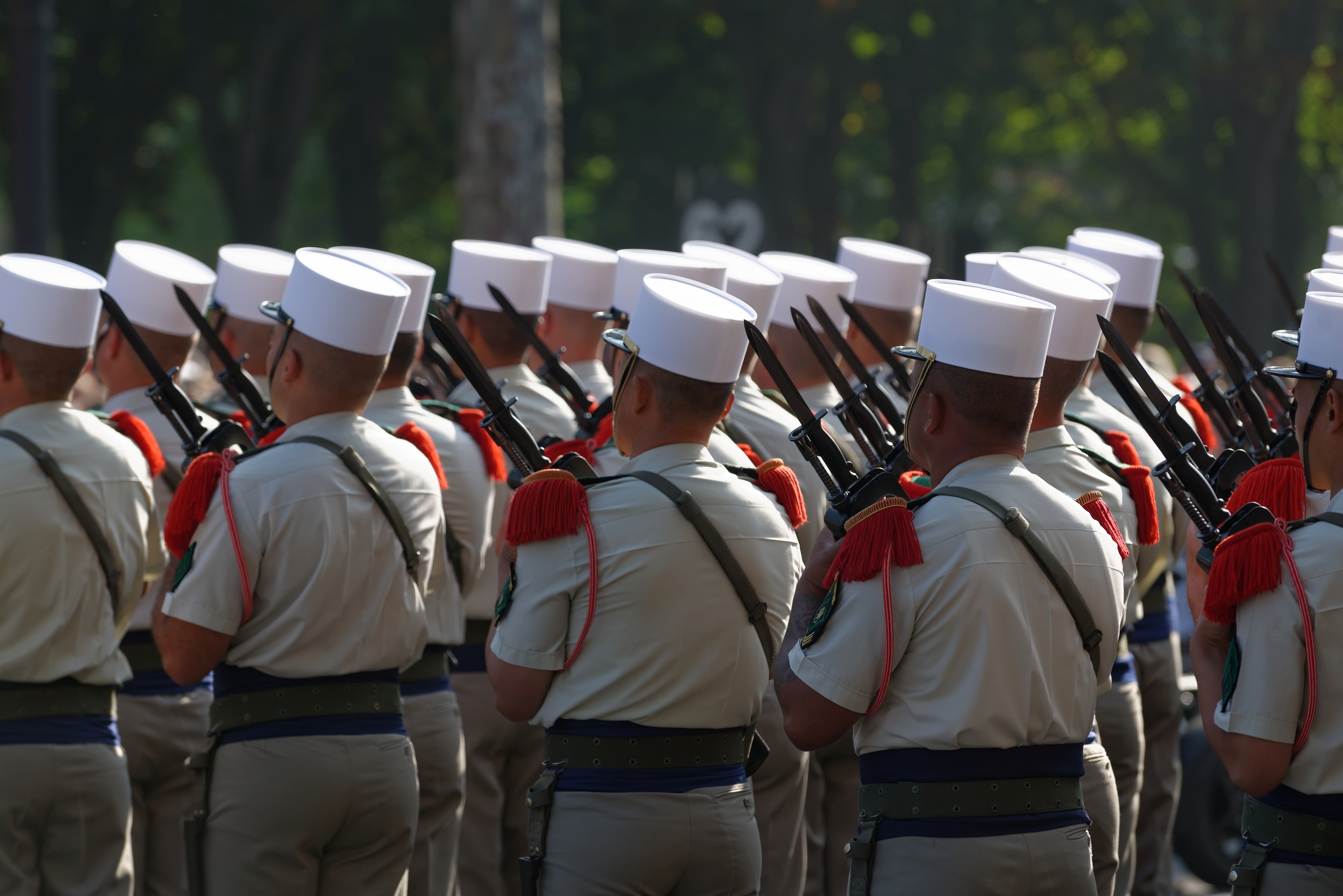
Legionnaires at the Bastille Day military parade on the Champs-Élysées in Paris

The Legion force, made up of 27 different nationalities, was attached to the French 6th Light Armoured Division whose mission was to protect the Coalition's left flank.

After the four-week air campaign, coalition forces launched the ground offensive. They quickly penetrated deep into Iraq, with the Legion taking the As-Salman Airport, meeting little resistance. The war ended after a hundred hours of fighting on the ground, which resulted in very light casualties for the Legion. During war, French Foreign Legion engineers operated in support of the U.S. Army's 82nd Airborne Division, and provided the EOD services to the division. After the ceasefire, they conducted a joint mine clearing operation with a Royal Australian Navy clearance divers.

==== 1991–2000 ====
- 1991: Evacuation of French citizens and foreigners in Rwanda, Gabon and Zaire
- 1992: Cambodia and Somalia
- 1993: Sarajevo, Bosnia and Herzegovina
- 1995: Rwanda
- 1996: Central African Republic
- 1997: Congo-Brazzaville
- Since 1999: KFOR in Kosovo and North Macedonia

=== 2001–present ===
- 2001–2014: Operation Enduring Freedom phase of the War in Afghanistan
- 2002–2003: Opération Licorne in Ivory Coast
- 2008: EUFOR Tchad/RCA in Chad
- 2013–2014: Operation Serval in the Northern Mali conflict
- 2015–present: Opération Sentinelle in Metropolitan France

== Organization ==
Regarding the operational aspect, the units of the Legion belong to different brigades or territorial commands of the French Army. With regard to the administrative management (including recruitment, traditions and training), these units depend on the Foreign Legion Command (COMLE), which itself is subordinate to the Army.

The regiments are now mainly stationed in Metropolitan France, with some units in the overseas departments and territories (mainly in French Guiana).

- Mainland France
  - 1er Régiment Étranger (1^{er} RE), based in Aubagne, France (HQ, selection and administration, other specific missions)
    - Pionniers Sections of Tradition
  - 1er Régiment Étranger de Cavalerie (1^{er} REC), based in Camp de Carpiagne, France
  - 1er Régiment Étranger de Génie (1^{er} REG), based in Laudun, France
    - Pionniers Groups
  - 2e Régiment Étranger d'Infanterie (2^{ème} REI), based in Nîmes, France
  - 2e Régiment Étranger de Génie (2^{ème} REG), based in St Christol, France
    - Pionniers Groups
  - 2e Régiment Étranger de Parachutistes (2^{ème} REP), based in Calvi, Corsica
  - 4e Régiment Étranger (4^{ème}RE), based in Castelnaudary, France
    - Pionniers Groups
  - Groupement de Recrutement de la Légion Etrangère (G.R.L.E), based at Fort de Nogent, France
  - 13e Demi-Brigade de Légion Étrangère (13^{ème} DBLE), based in La Cavalerie, France
- French Overseas Territories and Overseas Collectives, France
  - 3e Régiment Étranger d'Infanterie (3^{ème} REI), based in French Guiana
    - Pionniers Groups
  - 5e Régiment Étranger (5^{ème} RE), based in Mayotte

=== Current deployments ===
These are the following deployments:

Note: English names for countries or territories are in parentheses.

- Opérations extérieures (other than at home bases or on standard duties)
  - Guyane (French Guiana) Mission de presence sur l'Oyapok – Protection – 3^{ème} REI Protection CSG; 2^{ème} REP / CEA; 2^{ème} REI / 4^{ème} compagnie
  - Mayotte Prevention 5^{ème} RE Mission de souveraineté
  - Gabon Prevention 2^{ème} REP / 3^{ème} compagnie – 4^{ème} compagnie

Units
Acronym	French name	English meaning
CEA	Compagnie d'éclairage et d'appuis	Reconnaissance and Support Company
CSS	Compagnie de Soutien et de Service	Support and Service Company
CAC	Compagnie anti-char	Anti-Tank Company
UCL	Unité de commandement et de logistique	Unit of Command and Logistics
EMT	État-major tactique	Tactical Command Post
NEDEX	Neutralisation des explosifs	Explosive Ordnance Disposal
OMLT	Operational Mentoring and Liaison Team (The official name for this branch is in English)	

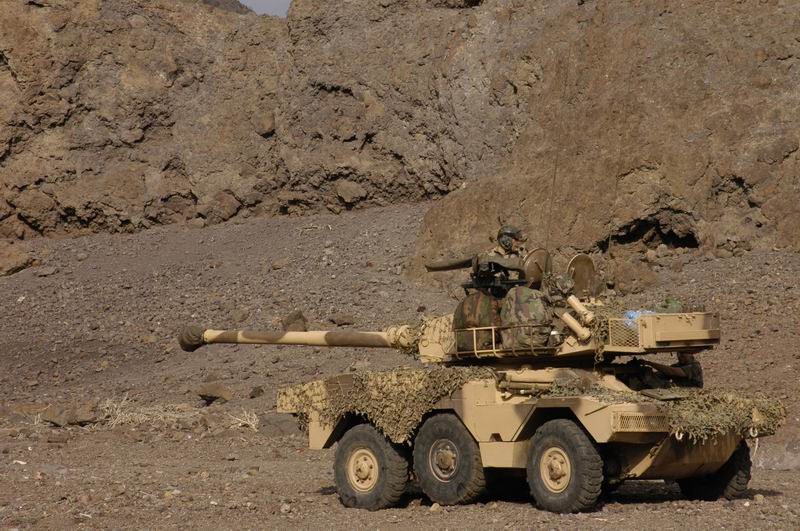
ERC 90 light tank of the 13th Demi-Brigade of the Foreign Legion (13^{ème}DBLE) in Djibouti

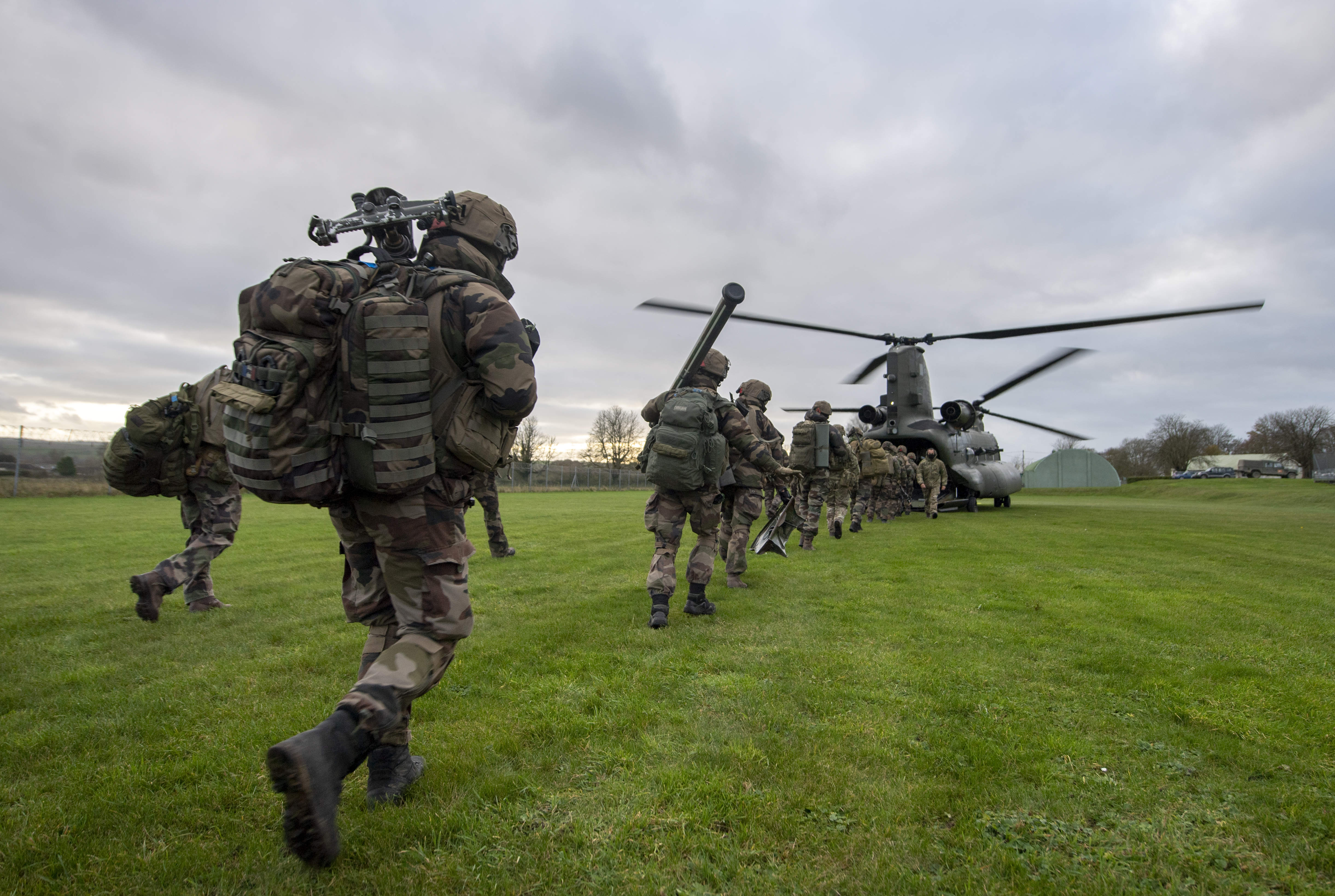
Paratroopers of 2^{ème} REP during Exercise wessex storm

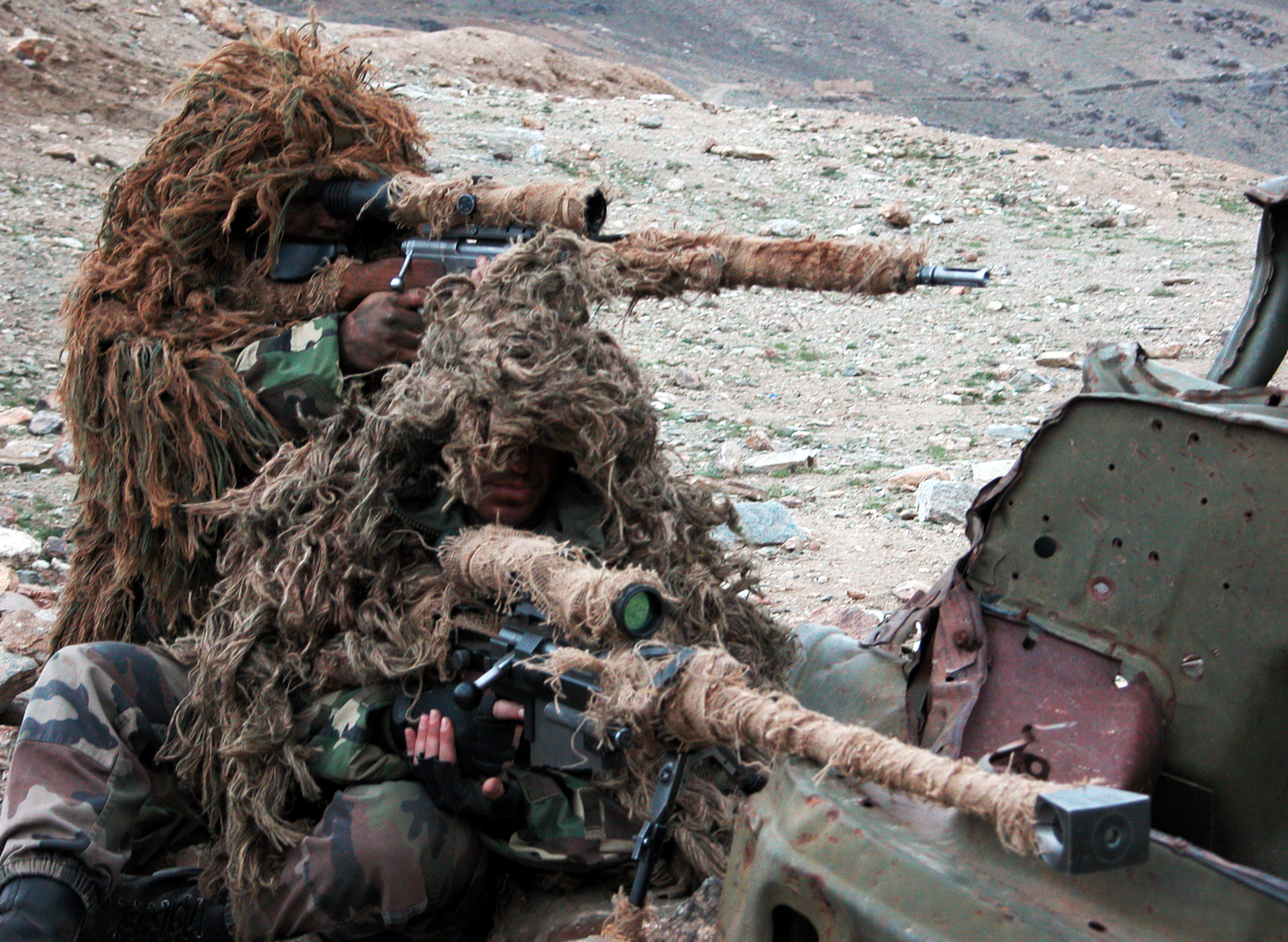
Snipers of the 2nd Foreign Infantry Regiment (2^{ème}REI) using a PGM Hécate and a FR-F2 during War in Afghanistan (2005)

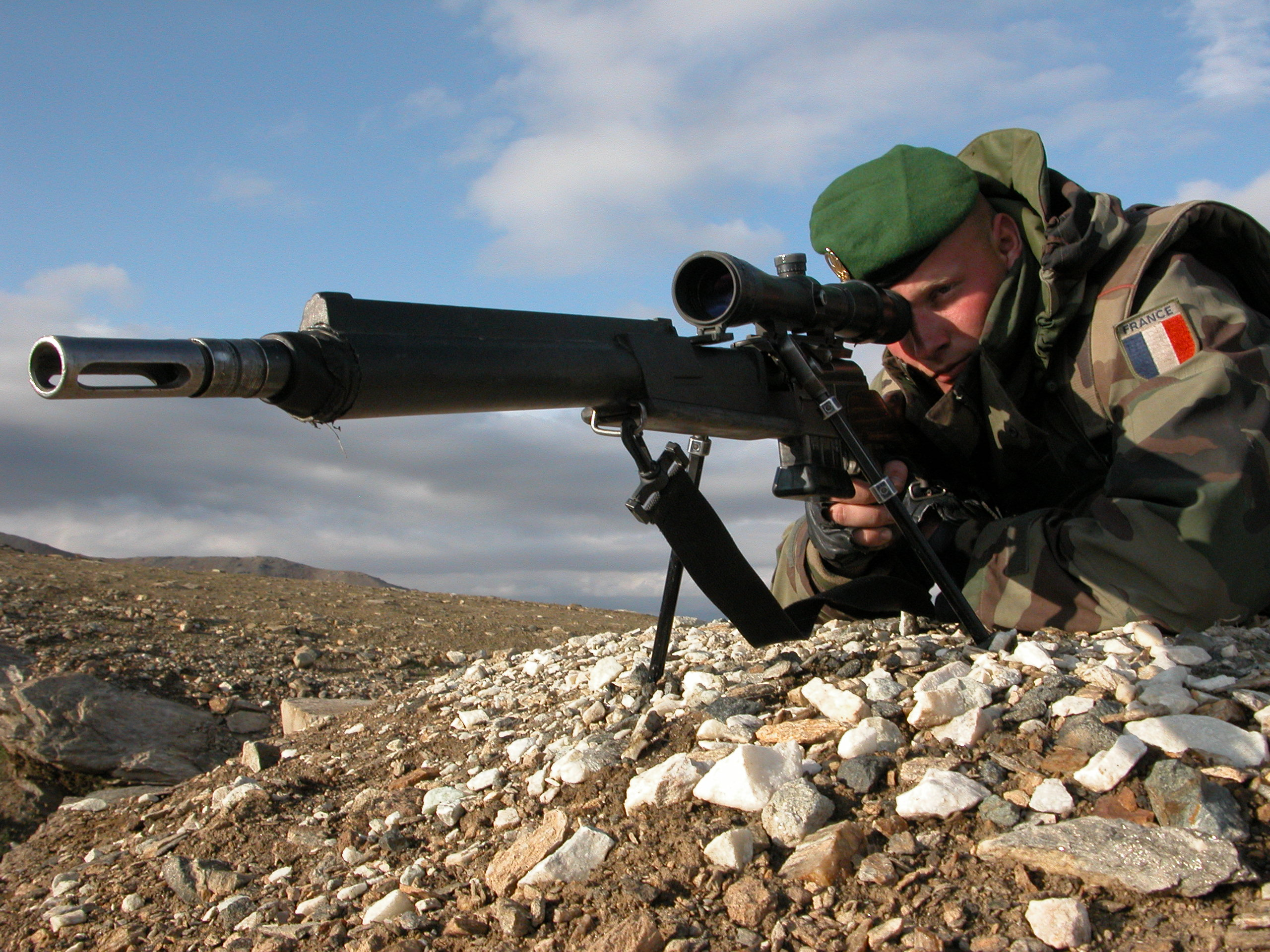
Legionnaire using an FR F2 during War in Afghanistan (2007)

=== DINOPS, PCG and Commandos ===
- 2^{ème} REP Commando Parachute Group (GCP); Pathfinders qualified in Direct Actions, Special Reconnaissance and IMEX.
- 1er Régiment Étranger de Génie 1^{er} REG; Parachute Underwater Demolition P.C.G Teams (Combat Engineer Divers, French: Plongeurs Commando group)
- 2e Régiment Étranger de Génie 2^{ème} REG; Parachute Underwater Demolition P.C.G Teams (Combat Engineer Divers, French: Plongeurs du Combat du Génie) and Mountain Commando Group (GCM) in some cases as double specialties.

== Composition ==
The Legionnaires are an integral part of the French Army. Today, they constitute some 7–8% of its strength (or 11% of the Ground Operational Forces, FOT, French Army operational units).

The Foreign Legion is the only unit of the French Army open to people of any nationality. Most legionnaires still come from European countries but a growing percentage comes from Latin America and Asia. Most of the Foreign Legion's commissioned officers are French with approximately 10% being Legionnaires who have risen through the ranks.

Members come from 140 countries. In the past, legionnaires were forced to enlist under a pseudonym ("declared identity"). This policy was designed to allow recruits who wanted to restart their lives to enlist. The Legion held the belief that it was fairer to make all new recruits use declared identities. French citizens can enlist under a declared, fictitious, foreign citizenship (generally, a francophone one, often that of Belgium, Canada, or Switzerland). As of 20 September 2010, new recruits may enlist under their real identities or under declared identities. Recruits who do enlist with declared identities may, after one year's service, regularise their situations under their true identities. After serving in the Foreign Legion for three years, a legionnaire may apply for French citizenship. He must be serving under his real name, must have no problems with the authorities, and must have served with "honour and fidelity".

The Foreign Legion does not accept women in its ranks, however, there has been one official female legionnaire, Susan Travers, an Englishwoman who joined the Free French Forces during World War II. She became a member of the Foreign Legion after the war, and subsequently served in Vietnam during the First Indochina War. In October 2000, it was announced women would no longer be barred from service. However, this announcement was retracted one month later and blamed on a "miscommunication"; a spokesman confirmed the policy barring women from the Legion would remain unchanged.

=== Membership by country ===
As of 2008, legionnaires came from 140 countries. The majority of enlisted men originate from outside France, while the majority of the officer corps consists of Frenchmen. Many recruits originate from Eastern Europe and Latin America. Neil Tweedie of The Daily Telegraph said that Germany traditionally provided many recruits, "somewhat ironically given the Legion's bloody role in two world wars."

As of 2024, Belarusian and Russian citizens are no longer allowed to join the legion due to the Russian invasion of Ukraine.

==== Alsace-Lorraine ====
Original nationalities of the Foreign Legion reflect events in history at the time they joined. Many former Wehrmacht personnel joined in the wake of World War II as many soldiers returning to civilian life found it hard to find reliable employment. Jean-Denis Lepage reports that "The Foreign Legion discreetly recruited from German P.O.W. camps", but adds that the number of these recruits has been subsequently exaggerated. Bernard B. Fall, who was a supporter of the French government, writing in the context of the First Indochina War, questioned the notion that the Foreign Legion was mainly German at that time, calling it:

[a] canard...with the sub-variant that all those Germans were at least SS generals and other much wanted war criminals. As a rule, and in order to prevent any particular nation from making the Foreign Legion into a Praetorian Guard, any particular national component is kept at about 25 percent of the total. Even supposing (and this was the case, of course) that the French recruiters, in the eagerness for candidates would sign up Germans enlisting as Swiss, Austrian, Scandinavian and other nationalities of related ethnic background, it is unlikely that the number of Germans in the Foreign Legion ever exceeded 35 percent. Thus, without making an allowance for losses, rotation, discharges, etc., the maximum number of Germans fighting in Indochina at any one time reached perhaps 7,000 out of 278,000. As to the ex-Nazis, the early arrivals contained a number of them, none of whom were known to be war criminals. French intelligence saw to that.
Since, in view of the rugged Indochinese climate, older men without previous tropical experience constituted more a liability than an asset, the average age of the Foreign Legion enlistees was about 23. At the time of the battle of Dien Bien Phu, any legionnaire of that age group was at the worst, in his "Hitler Youth" shorts when the [Third] Reich collapsed.

The Foreign Legion accepts people enlisting under a nationality that is not their own. A proportion of the Swiss and Belgians are actually likely to be Frenchmen who wish to avoid detection. In addition many Alsatians are said to have joined the Foreign Legion when Alsace was part of the German Empire, and may have been recorded as German while considering themselves French.

Regarding recruitment conditions within the Foreign Legion, see the official page (in English) dedicated to the subject: With regard to age limits, recruits can be accepted from ages ranging from 17½ (with parental consent) to 39½ years old.

=== Countries that allow post-Foreign Legion contract ===
In the European Union framework, post Legion enlistment is less clear. Denmark, Norway, Germany and Portugal allow post-Legion enlistment. The European Union twin threads seem to be recognized dual nationality status or restricting constitutional article.

The United States allows post-Legion enlistment in its National Guard of career soldiers (up to the rank of captain) who are Green Card holders.

Israel allows post-Legion enlistment.

One of the biggest national groups in the Legion are Poles. Polish law allows service in a foreign army, but only after written permission from the Polish Ministry of National Defence.

== Recruitment process ==
Arrival	1 to 3 days in a Foreign Legion Information Center. Reception, information, and terms of contract. Afterwards transferred to Paris, Foreign Legion Recruitment Center.
Pre-selection	1 to 4 days in a Foreign Legion Recruitment Center (Paris). Confirmation of motivation, initial medical check-up, finalising enlistment papers and signing of 5-year service contract.
Selection	7 to 30 days in the Recruitment and Selection Center in Aubagne. Psychological and personality tests, logic tests (no education requirements), medical exam, physical condition tests, motivation and security interviews. Confirmation or denial of selection.
Passed selection	Signing and handing-over of the five-year service contract. Incorporation into the Foreign Legion as a trainee.

=== Basic training ===
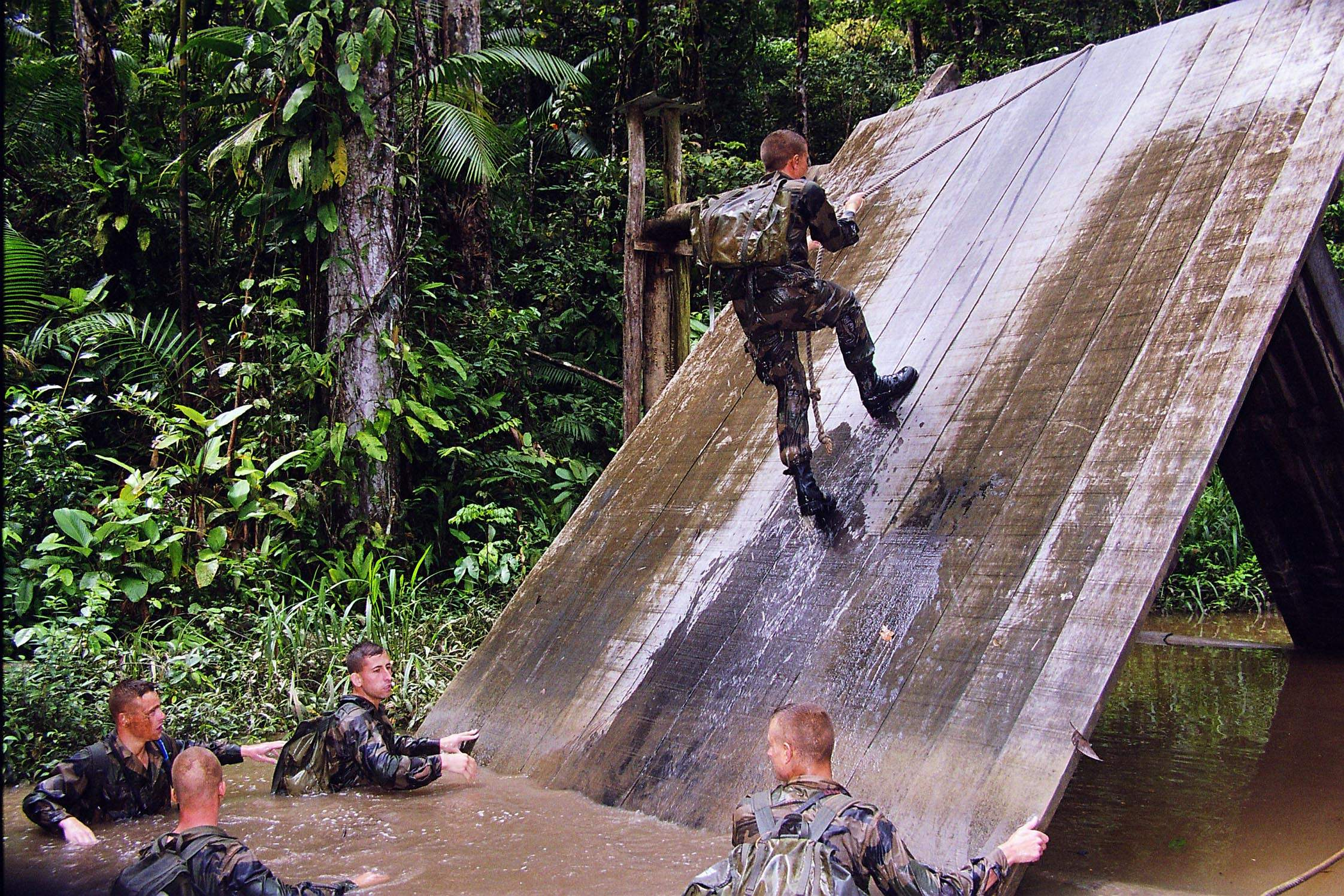
Legionnaires training in French Guiana

While all rank and file members of the Legion are required to serve under "Foreign Status" (à titre étranger), even if they are French nationals, non-commissioned and commissioned officers can serve under either French or Foreign Status. Foreign Status NCOs and officers are exclusively promoted from the ranks and represent 10% of the officers corps of the Legion. French Status officers are either members of other units of the French Army attached to the Legion or promoted Legionnaires who have chosen to become French nationals.

Basic training for the Foreign Legion is conducted in the 4th Foreign Regiment. This is an operational combat regiment which provides a training course of 15–17 weeks, before recruits are assigned to their operational units:

- Initial training of 4–6 weeks at "The Farm" (La Ferme) – introduction to military lifestyle; outdoor and field activities.
- Képi Blanc March (Marche Képi Blanc) – a 50-kilometer two-day march (25 km per day) in full kit, followed by the Képi Blanc ceremony on the 3rd day.
- Technical and practical training (alternating with barracks and field training) – three weeks.
- Mountain training (at Formiguères in the French Pyrenees) – one week.
- Technical and practical training (alternating barracks and field training) – three weeks.
- Examinations and obtention of the elementary technical certificate (CTE) – one week.
- Raid March (Marche Raid) – a 120-kilometer final march, which must be completed in three days.
- Light vehicle drivers education (drivers license) – one week.
- Return to Aubagne before reporting to the assigned operational regiment – one week.

Education in the French language (reading, writing and pronunciation) is taught on a daily basis throughout all of basic training.

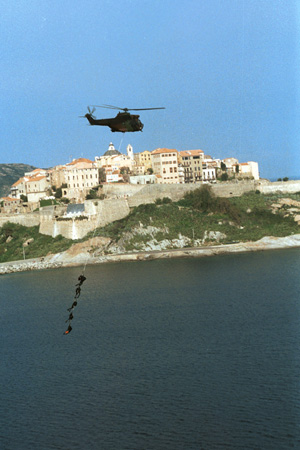
Legionnaires roping from a Puma over Calvi.

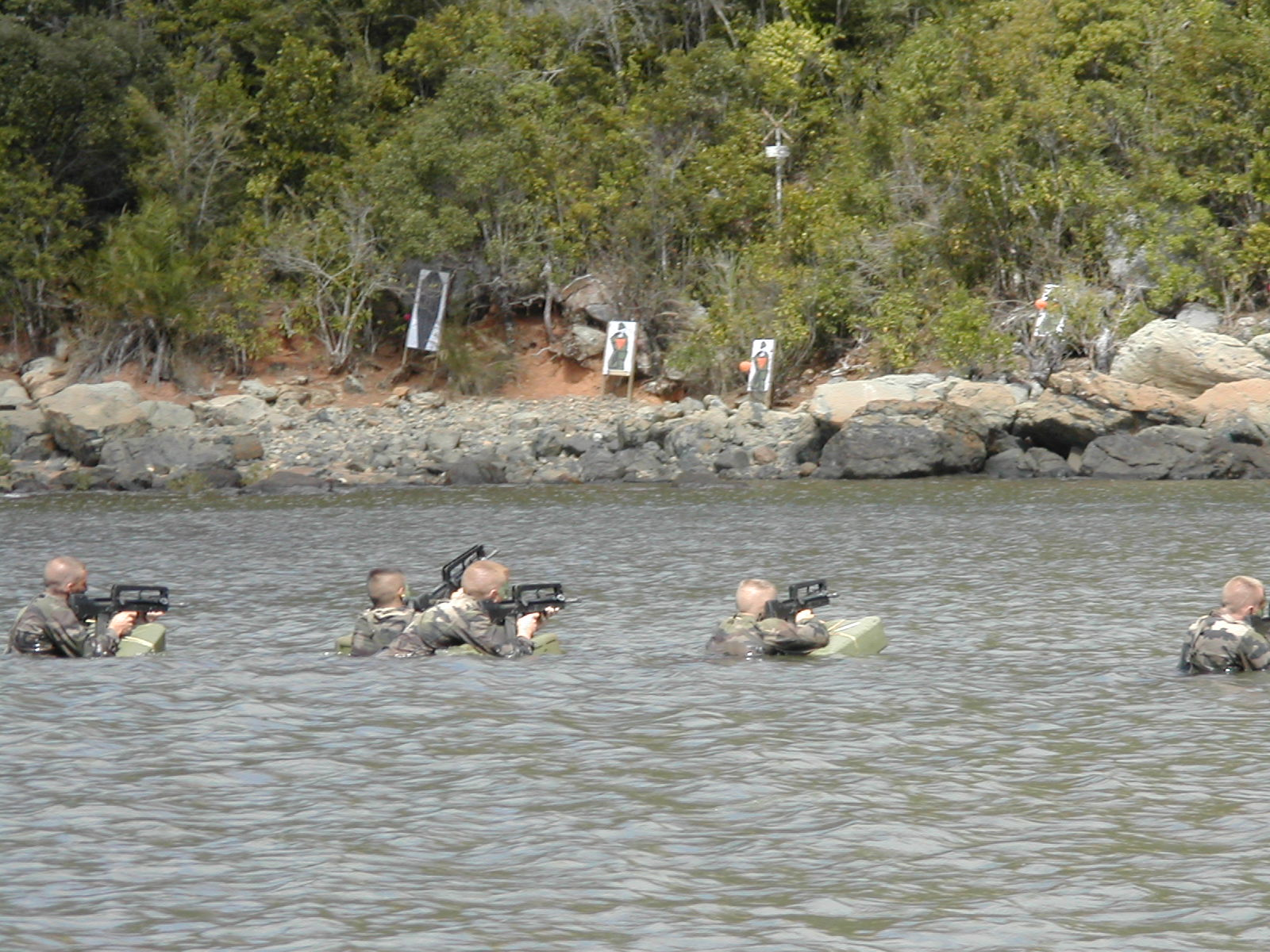
Legionnaires at Mayotte.

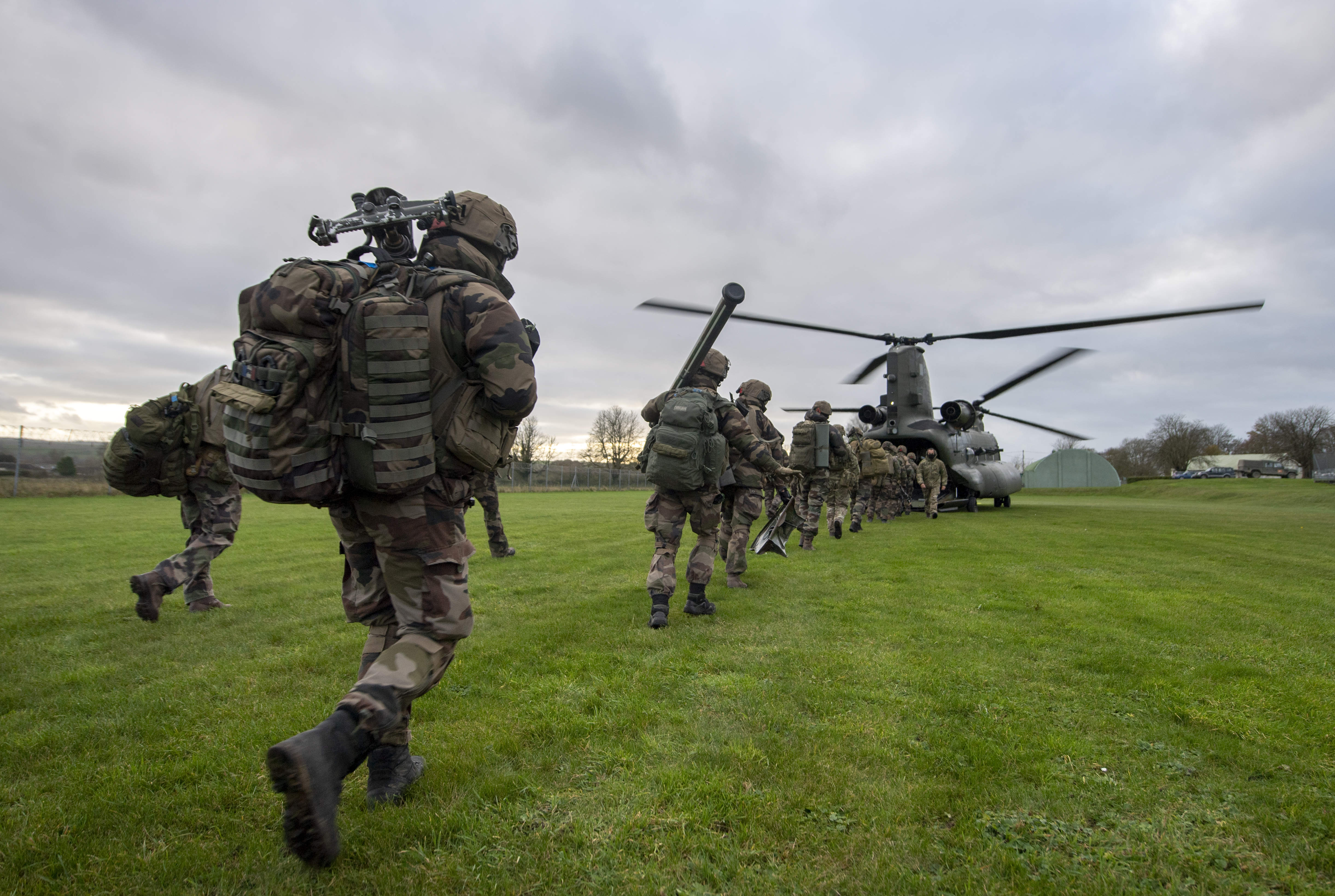
Legionnaires boarding a Chinook helicopter.

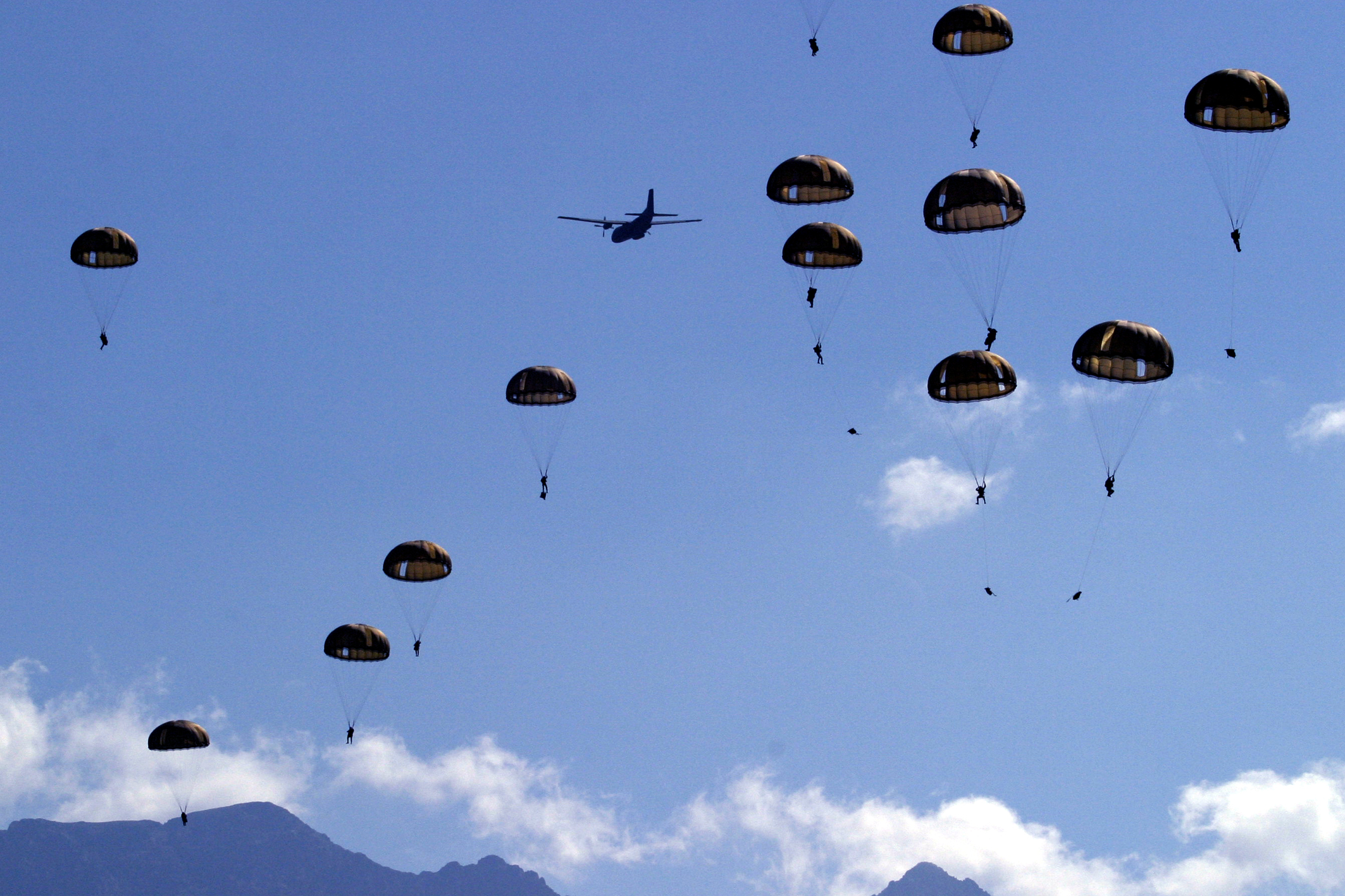
Legionnaires parachute from a C-160 while training at Camp Raffalli in Corsica.

== Traditions ==
As the Foreign Legion is composed of soldiers of different nationalities and backgrounds, it is necessary to develop an esprit de corps, which is achieved through the development of camaraderie, specific traditions, the loyalty of its legionnaires, the quality of their training, and the pride of being a soldier in an elite unit.

=== Code of honour ===
The "Legionnaire's Code of Honour" is the Legion's creed, recited in French only. The Code of Honour was adopted in the 1980s.

	Code d'honneur du légionnaire	Legionnaire's Code of Honour
Art. 1	Légionnaire, tu es un volontaire, servant la France avec honneur et fidélité.	Legionnaire, you are a volunteer serving France with honour and loyalty.
Art. 2	Chaque légionnaire est ton frère d'armes, quelle que soit sa nationalité, sa race ou sa religion. Tu lui manifestes toujours la solidarité étroite qui doit unir les membres d'une même famille.	Each legionnaire is your brother in arms whatever his nationality, his race or his religion might be. You show him the same close solidarity that links the members of the same family.
Art. 3	Respectueux des traditions, attaché à tes chefs, la discipline et la camaraderie sont ta force, le courage et la loyauté tes vertus.	Respect for traditions, devotion to your leaders, discipline and comradeship are your strengths, courage and loyalty your virtues.
Art. 4	Fier de ton état de légionnaire, tu le montres dans ta tenue toujours élégante, ton comportement toujours digne mais modeste, ton casernement toujours net.	Proud of your status as legionnaire, you display this in your always impeccable uniform, your always dignified but modest behaviour, and your clean living quarters.
Art. 5	Soldat d'élite, tu t'entraînes avec rigueur, tu entretiens ton arme comme ton bien le plus précieux, tu as le souci constant de ta forme physique.	An elite soldier, you train rigorously, you maintain your weapon as your most precious possession, and you take constant care of your physical form.
Art. 6	La mission est sacrée, tu l'exécutes jusqu'au bout et, s'il le faut, en opérations, au péril de ta vie.	The mission is sacred, you carry it out until the end and, if necessary in the field, at the risk of your life.
Art. 7	Au combat, tu agis sans passion et sans haine, tu respectes les ennemis vaincus, tu n'abandonnes jamais ni tes morts, ni tes blessés, ni tes armes.	In combat, you act without passion and without hate, you respect defeated enemies, and you never abandon your dead, your wounded, or your arms.

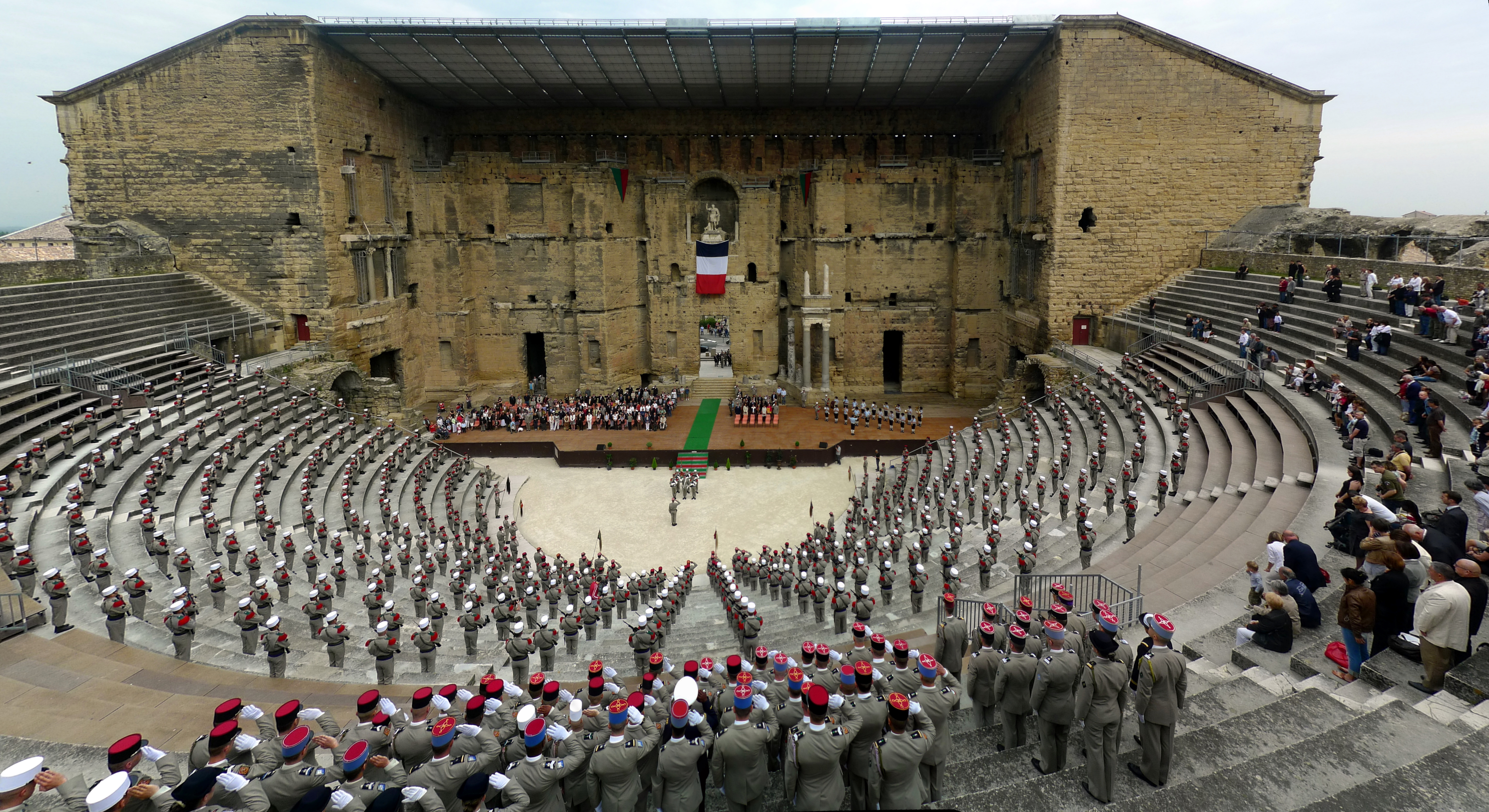
Commemoration of the Battle of Camarón by the 1st Foreign Cavalry Regiment at the Roman Theatre of Orange

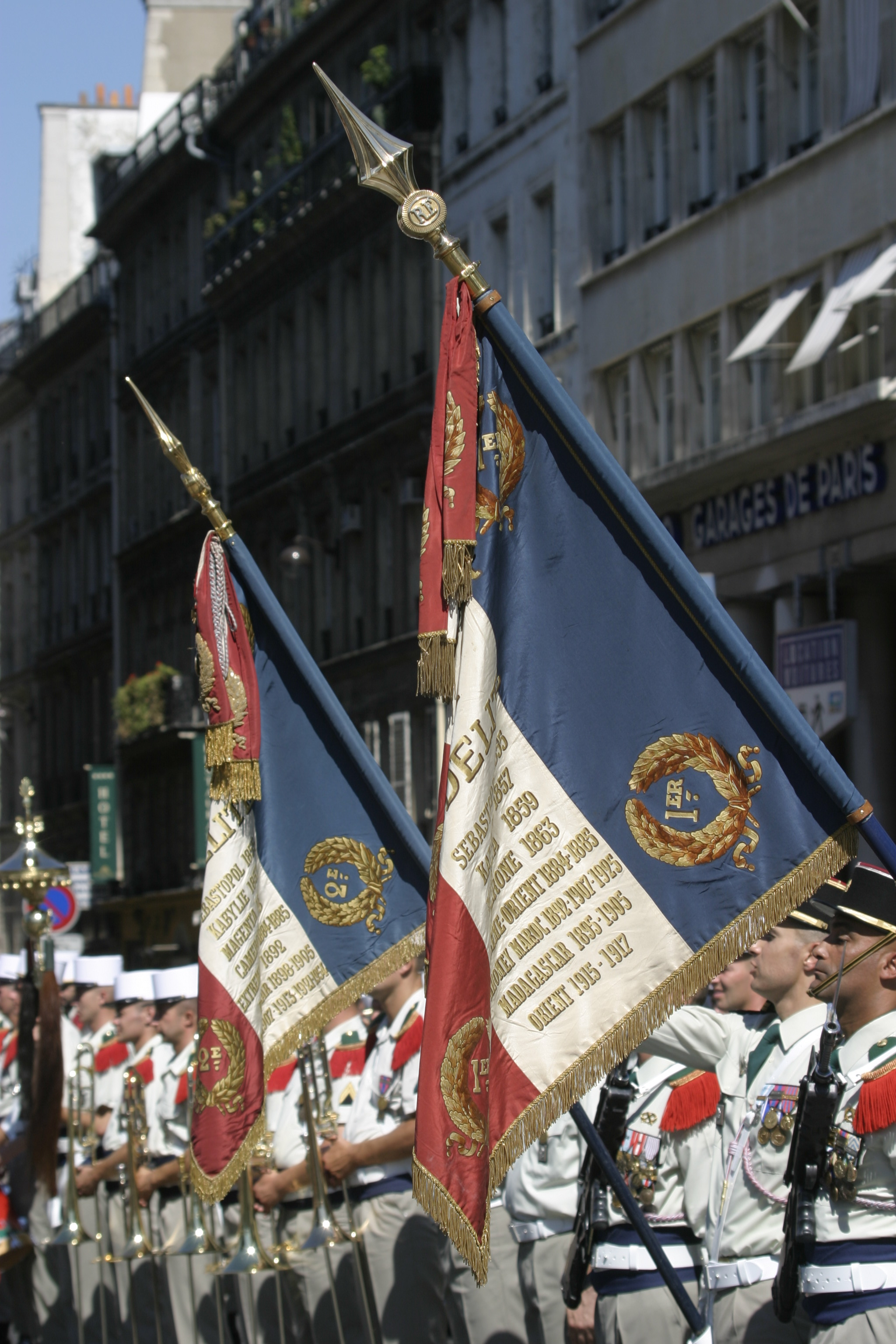
Regimental flags of the 1st Foreign Regiment and 2nd Regiments in Paris, 2003

=== Mottos ===
==== Honneur et Fidélité ====
In contrast to all other French Army units, the motto embroidered on the Foreign Legion's regimental flags is not Honneur et Patrie (Honour and Fatherland) but Honneur et Fidélité (Honour and Fidelity).

==== Legio Patria Nostra ====
Legio Patria Nostra (in French La Légion est notre Patrie, in English The Legion is our Fatherland) is the Latin motto of the Foreign Legion. The adoption of the Foreign Legion as a new "Fatherland" does not imply the repudiation by the legionnaire of his original nationality. The Foreign Legion is required to obtain the agreement of any legionnaire before he is placed in any situation where he might have to serve against his country of birth.

==== Regimental mottos ====
- 1^{er} R.E: Honneur et Fidélité
- G.R.L.E: Honneur et Fidélité
- 1^{er} REC: Honneur et Fidélité and Nec Pluribus Impar (No other equal)
- 2^{e} REP: Honneur et Fidélité and More Majorum (in the manner, ways and traditions of our veterans foreign regiments)
- 2^{e} REI: Honneur et Fidélité and Être prêt (Be ready)
- 2^{e} REG: Honneur et Fidélité and Rien n'empêche (Nothing prevents)
- 3^{e} REI: Honneur et Fidélité and Legio Patria Nostra
- 4^{e} R.E: Honneur et Fidélité and Creuset de la Légion et Régiment des fortes têtes (The crucible of the Legion and the strong right minded regiment)
- 1^{er} REG: Honneur et Fidélité and Ad Unum (All to one end – for the regiment until the last one)
- 13^{e} DBLE: Honneur et Fidélité and More Majorum (in the manner, ways and traditions of our veterans foreign regiments)
- DLEM: Honneur et Fidélité and Pericula Ludus (Dangers game – for the regiment To Danger is my pleasure of the 2nd Foreign Cavalry Regiment)

=== Insignia ===
The Legion's emblem consists of a flaming heraldic grenade in the shape of a French fleur-de-lis.

Regiment	Colors	Insignia	Beret insignia	Tenure	Notable commandants
Le Commandement de la Légion étrangère (C.O.M.L.E)				1931–present	général Paul-Frédéric Rollet général Raoul Magrin-Vernerey général Jean-Claude Coullon
1st Foreign Regiment (1^{er} R.E.)				1841–present	François Achille Bazaine; Colonel Raphaël Vienot; Pierre Joseph Jeanningros; Captain Jean Danjou; Peter I of Serbia; Herbert Kitchener, 1st Earl Kitchener; Paul-Frédéric Rollet Commandant Pierre Segrétain; Lieutenant Colonel Pierre Paul Jeanpierre
4th Foreign Regiment (4^{ème} R.E.)	*			1920–1940; 1941–1943; 1948–1963; 1976 –present	
Foreign Legion Recruiting Group (G.R.L.E)	*			2007–present	
Legion Pionniers (Pionniers de La Légion Etrangère); 1st Foreign Regiment; Pionniers Sections of Tradition; 1st Foreign Engineer Regiment; Pionniers Groups; 2nd Foreign Engineer Regiment; Pionniers Groups; 3rd Foreign Infantry Regiment; Pionniers Groups; 4th Foreign Regiment; Pionniers Groups; Foreign Legion Detachment in Mayotte; Pionniers Groups			1e RE; 1e REG; 2e REG; 3e RE; 4e RE; D.L.E.M	1831–present	
Communal Depot of the Foreign Regiments (D.C.R.E)			*	1933–1955; 1955–present	Colonel Louis-Antoine Gaultier
1st Foreign Infantry Regiment (1^{er} R.E.I)				1950–1955	
1st Foreign Cavalry Regiment (1^{er} R.E.C)		Nec Pluribus Impar		1921–present	
Foreign Air Supply Company (C.E.R.A)	*			1951	
Parachute Company of the 3rd Foreign Infantry Regiment (Para Co. du 3^{ème} R.E.I)	*			1948–1949; 1st Foreign Parachute Battalion 1er BEP (1948–1955)	Lieutenant Jacques Morin (Company Commander); Lieutenant Paul Arnaud de Foïard (Section-Platoon, Commander)
1st Foreign Parachute Battalion (1^{er} B.E.P)	*			1948–1955	Commandant Pierre Segrétain (1^{er} BEP, I formation); Lieutenant Colonel Pierre Jeanpierre (1^{er} BEP, I, II and III formations); Captain Pierre Sergent
1st Foreign Parachute Regiment (1^{er} R.E.P)	*	Marche ou Creve		1955–1961	Lieutenant Colonel Pierre Jeanpierre Commandant Hélie de Saint Marc; Captain Pierre Sergent; Guy Rubin de Cervens
1st Foreign Parachute Heavy Mortar Company (1^{ère} C.E.P.M.L)	*			1953–1954	Lieutenant Jacques Molinier; Lieutenant Paul Turcy; Lieutenant Erwan Bergot; Lieutenant Jean Singland
1st Foreign Engineer Regiment (1^{er} R.E.G)		Ad Unum		1999–present	
2nd Foreign Engineer Regiment (2^{ème} R.E.G)		Rien n'empêche		1999–present	
2nd Foreign Cavalry Regiment (2^{ème} R.E.C)	*			1939–1940; 1945–1962	
2nd Foreign Infantry Regiment (2^{ème} R.E.I)		Être Prêt		3 April 1841 – 1 April 1943; 1 August 1945 – 1 January 1968; 1 September 1972 – present	Patrice de MacMahon, Duke of Magenta; François Certain Canrobert; Jean-Luc Carbuccia; Colonel de Chabrières; Pierre Joseph Jeanningros; Captain Jean Danjou; Commandant Pierre Segrétain; Lieutenant Colonel Pierre Paul Jeanpierre
2nd Foreign Parachute Battalion (2^{ème} B.E.P)	*			1948–1955	Commandant Barthélémy Rémy Raffali; Captain Georges Hamacek
2nd Foreign Parachute Regiment (2^{ème} R.E.P)		More Majorum		1955–present	Lieutenant Colonel Paul Arnaud de Foïard
2nd Marching Regiment of the 1st Foreign Regiment- 2^{ème}RM.1^{er} RE (1914–1915); 3rd Marching Regiment of the 1st Foreign Regiment- 3^{ème}RM.1^{er}RE (1914–1915); 4th Marching Regiment of the 1st Foreign Regiment- 4^{ème}RM.1^{er}RE (1914–1915); 2nd Marching Regiment of the 2nd Foreign Regiment- 2^{ème}RM.2^{ème}RE (1914–1915); Marching Regiment of the Foreign Legion (R.M.L.E)	*			1915–1920; 1942–1945; 3rd Foreign Infantry Regiment–present	Colonel Paul-Frédéric Rollet; Lieutenant-Colonel Peppino Garibaldi; Colonel Alphonse Van Hecke; Eugene Bullard; American poet Alan Seeger; Swiss poet, French naturalized Blaise Cendrars; Lieutenant Colonel Prince Count Aage of Rosenborg; Italian writer, Curzio Malaparte; Lazare Ponticelli
3rd Foreign Infantry Regiment (3^{ème} R.E.I)	*	Legio Patria Nostra		11 November 1915 – present	
Marching Regiments of Foreign Volunteers (RMVE); 21st Marching Regiment of Foreign Volunteers- 21^{e} R.M.V.E (1939–1940); 22nd Marching Regiment of Foreign Volunteers- 22^{e} R.M.V.E (1939–1940); 23rd Marching Regiment of Foreign Volunteers- 23^{e} R.M.V.E (1940)	*			1939–1940	
3rd Foreign Parachute Battalion (3^{ème} B.E.P)	*			1948–1955	Captain Darmuzai
3rd Foreign Parachute Regiment (3^{ème} R.E.P)	*			1955–1955	Captain Darmuzai
5th Foreign Infantry Regiment (5^{ème} R.E.I)				1930–2000	
6th Foreign Infantry Regiment (6^{ème} R.E.I)		Ad Unum		1939–1940; 1949–1955	Commandant Pierre Segrétain; Lieutenant Colonel Pierre Jeanpierre
6th Foreign Engineer Regiment (6^{ème} R.E.G)		Ad Unum		1984–1999; 1999–1e REG	
11th Foreign Infantry Regiment (11^{ème} R.E.I)	*			1939–1940	
12th Foreign Infantry Regiment (12^{ème} R.E.I)	*			1939–1940	
13th Demi-Brigade of the Foreign Legion (13^{ème} D.B.L.E)		More Majorum		1940–present	
Foreign Legion Detachment in Mayotte (D.L.E.M)	*	Pericula Ludus		1973–present	

== Ranks ==
All volunteers in the Foreign Legion begin their careers as basic legionnaires with one in four eventually becoming a sous-officier (non-commissioned officer). On joining, a new recruit receives a monthly salary of €1,572 in addition to food and lodgings. He is also given his own new rifle, which according to the lore of the Legion must never be left on a battlefield. Promotion is concurrent with the ranks in the French Army.

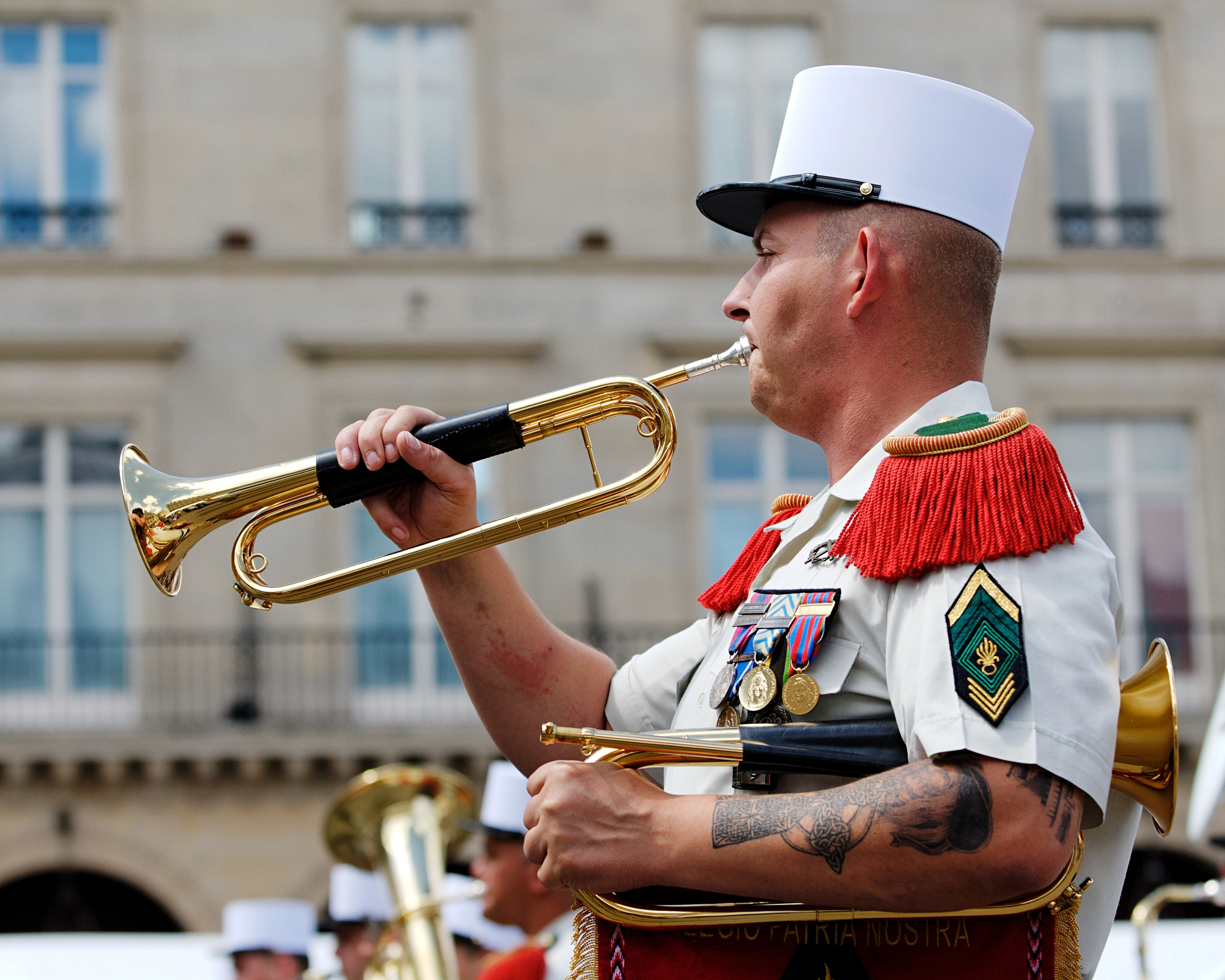
A Caporal-chef, with 3 chevrons of seniority, bugling during the Bastille Day Military Parade.

Foreign Legion rank	Equivalent rank	NATO Code	Period of service	Insignia
Engagé Volontaire	Recruit	–	15 weeks basic training.	None
Legionnaire 2e Classe	Private / 2nd Class Legionnaire	OR-1	Promoted after completion of training and Marche képi blanc (White Kepi march).	
Legionnaire 1e Classe	Private / 1st Class Legionnaire	OR-2	Promoted after ten months of service.	
Caporal	Corporal	OR-3	Promotion possible after one year of service and completion of the Fonctionnaire Caporal (or Caporal "Fut Fut") course. Recruits selected for this course need to show good leadership skills during basic training.	
Caporal-Chef	Senior Corporal	OR-4	Promotion after six years of service.	
Table note: Command insignia in the Foreign Legion use gold lace or braid indicating infantry troops in the French Army. The Légion étrangère service color is green (for the now-defunct colonial Armée d'Afrique) instead of red (regular infantry).

=== Non-commissioned and warrant officers ===
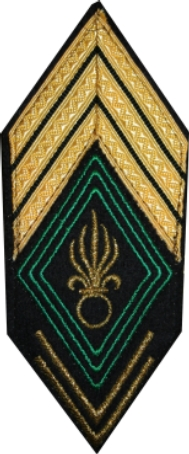
A dress uniform insignia for a Sous-officier

A dress uniform's insignia is composed of three components; rank emblem, regimental patch, and seniority chevrons. In the one pictured, the three upward pointing gold chevrons indicate a Sergent-chef. The diamond-shaped regimental patch (Écusson) is formed of three green diamond shapes surrounding a grenade emblem, with the three diamonds indicating a Colonial unit, in comparison to one diamond for a unit of Regulars, or two diamonds for a Reserves unit. The Légion grenade emblem has seven flames rather than the usual five, and the two downward pointing seniority chevrons indicate at least 10 years of service. Some Caporals-Chef may have as many as six seniority chevrons for 30 or more years of service. This style of insignia is worn only on the left sleeve of the dress uniform, while a similar-sized insignia without the regimental diamond and seniority chevrons is worn on the right sleeve. An exception exists for the right sleeve insignia for the Pioneer units, which incorporates a gold or green Pioneer emblem, depending on rank, but not the seniority chevrons, which are worn on the left sleeve insignia below the regimental diamond as previously described.

Sous-officiers (NCOs) including warrant officers account for 25% of the current Foreign Legion's total manpower.

Foreign Legion rank	Equivalent rank	NATO Code	Period of service	Insignia
Sergent	Sergeant	OR-5	Promotion after three years of service as Caporal.	
Sergent-Chef	Senior Sergeant	OR-6	Promotion after three years as Sergent and from seven to fourteen years of service.	
Adjudant	Warrant Officer	OR-8	Promotion after three years as Sergent-Chef.	
Adjudant-Chef (Note: No further promotions are given to non-French Legionnaires on attaining the rank of Adjudant-Chef, unless they become naturalized citizens of France. In 2016, of those Foreign Legion Officers serving at Foreign Titles (French: Officiers servant à titre étranger), 10% were seconded officers from the ranks.)	Chief Warrant Officer	OR-9	Promotion after four years as Adjudant and at least fourteen years of service.	
Major (Note: Since 1 January 2009, the French military rank of major has been included under the heading of sous-officiers. Previously, Major had been an independent rank positioned between NCOs and commissioned officers. It is an executive position within a regiment or demi-brigade having responsibility for administrative and disciplinary issues)	Major	OR-9	Promotion after either passing an examination or without an examination after a minimum of fourteen years service.	

=== Commissioned officers ===
Most officers are regulars of the French Army though roughly 10% are former non-commissioned officers promoted from the ranks.

Foreign Legion rank	Equivalent rank	NATO Code	Command responsibility	Insignia
Aspirant	Officer Designate	OF-D	Officer Designate. Technically it is not a commissioned rank but it is still treated in all respects as one. Aspirants are either officers in training or volunteers serving as temporary officers. He may afterwards apply to obtain permanent commissioned status as a Sous-lieutenant.	
Sous-Lieutenant	Second lieutenant	OF-1	Junior section leader	
Lieutenant	First lieutenant	OF-1	Platoon commander	
Capitaine	Captain	OF-2	Company commander	
Commandant	Major	OF-3	Battalion commander	
Lieutenant-Colonel	Lieutenant colonel	OF-4	Junior commander of a régiment or demi-brigade	
Colonel	Colonel	OF-5	Régiment or demi-brigade commander	
Général de brigade	Brigadier general	OF-6	Commander of a brigade composed of régiments or demi-brigades.	
Général de division	Divisional general	OF-7	Entire division or Army Corps of the French Foreign Legion (Commandement de la Légion étrangère)	

=== Seniority chevrons ===
The Foreign Legion uses gold coloured chevrons (chevrons d'ancienneté) pointed downward to indicate seniority. Worn by ordinary legionnaires and non-commissioned officers beneath the rank insignia and regimental emblem only on the left sleeve of the dress uniform, each chevron denotes five years of service in the Legion. Seniority chevrons are not worn by commissioned officers.

=== Honorary ranks ===
Honorary ranks have been awarded by the French Army to individuals credited with exceptional acts of courage since 1796. In the Foreign Legion, General Paul-Frédéric Rollet introduced the practice of awarding honorary Legion ranks to distinguished individuals, both civilian and military, in the early 20th century.

Recipients of these honorary appointments had participated with units of the Legion on active service in an exemplary manner, or had rendered exceptional service to the Legion in non-combat situations. More than 1,200 individuals have been granted honorary ranks in the Legion pour services éminent. The majority of these awards have been made to military personnel in wartime, earning titles such as Legionnaire d'Honneur or Sergent-Chef de Légion d'honneur, while other recipients have included nurses, journalists, painters, and ministers who have rendered meritorious service to the Foreign Legion.

== Pioneers ==
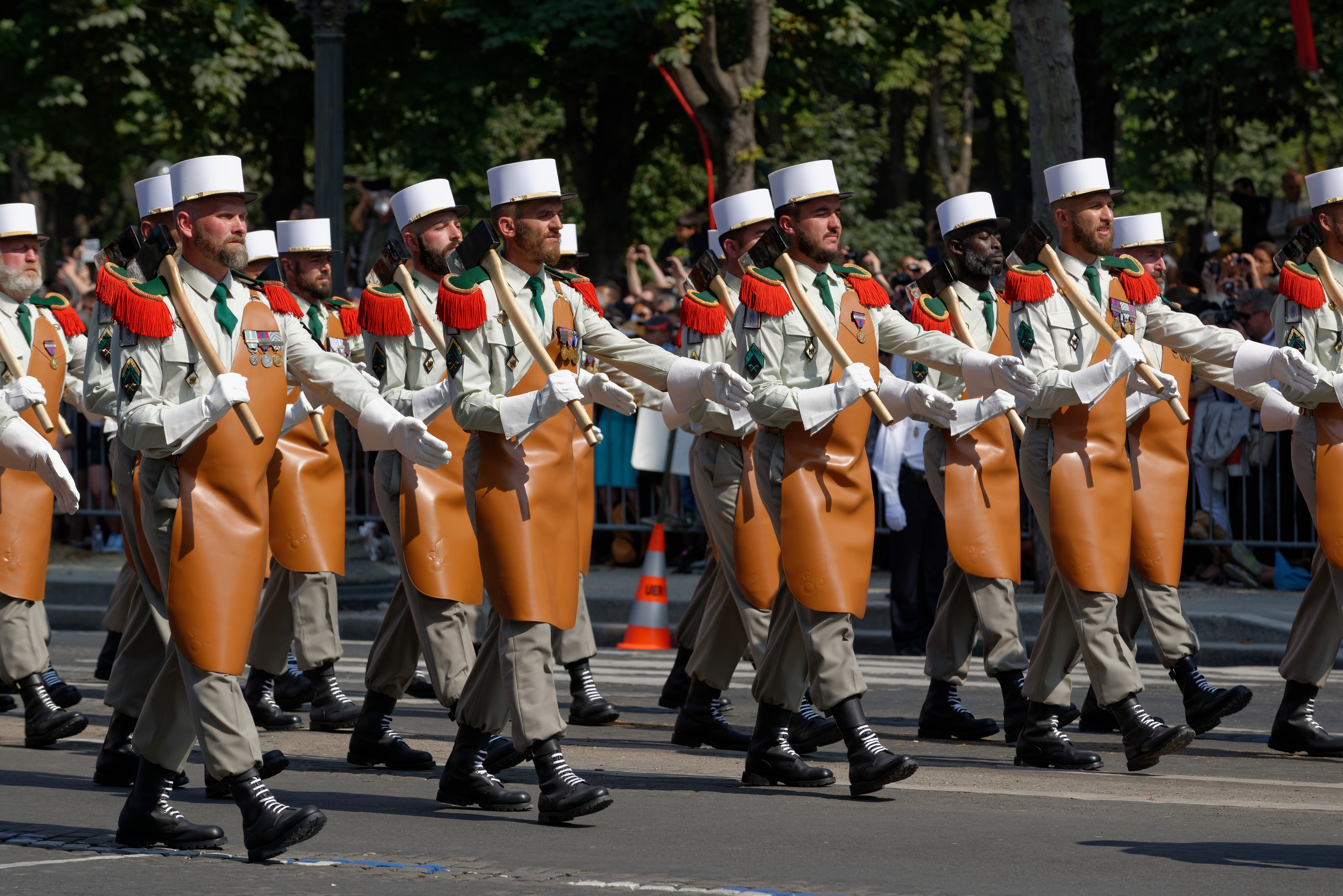
The Pioneers of the 1st Foreign Regiment

The Pionniers (pioneers) are the combat engineers and a traditional unit of the Foreign Legion. The sapper traditionally sport large beards, wear leather aprons and gloves and hold axes. The sappers were very common in European armies during the Napoleonic Era but progressively disappeared during the 19th century. The French Army, including the Legion disbanded its regimental sapper platoons in 1870. However, in 1931 one of a number of traditions restored to mark the hundredth anniversary of the Legion's founding was the reestablishment of its bearded Pionniers.

In the French Army, since the 18th century, every infantry regiment included a small detachment of pioneers. In addition to undertaking road building and entrenchment work, such units were tasked with using their axes and shovels to clear obstacles under enemy fire opening the way for the rest of the infantry. The danger of such missions was recognised by allowing certain privileges, such as being authorised to wear beards.

The current pioneer platoon of the Foreign Legion is provided by the Legion depot and headquarters regiment for public ceremonies. The unit has reintroduced the symbols of the Napoleonic sappers: the beard, the axe, the leather apron, the crossed-axes insignia and the leather gloves. When parades of the Foreign Legion are opened by this unit, it is to commemorate the traditional role of the sappers "opening the way" for the troops.

== Marching cadences and songs ==
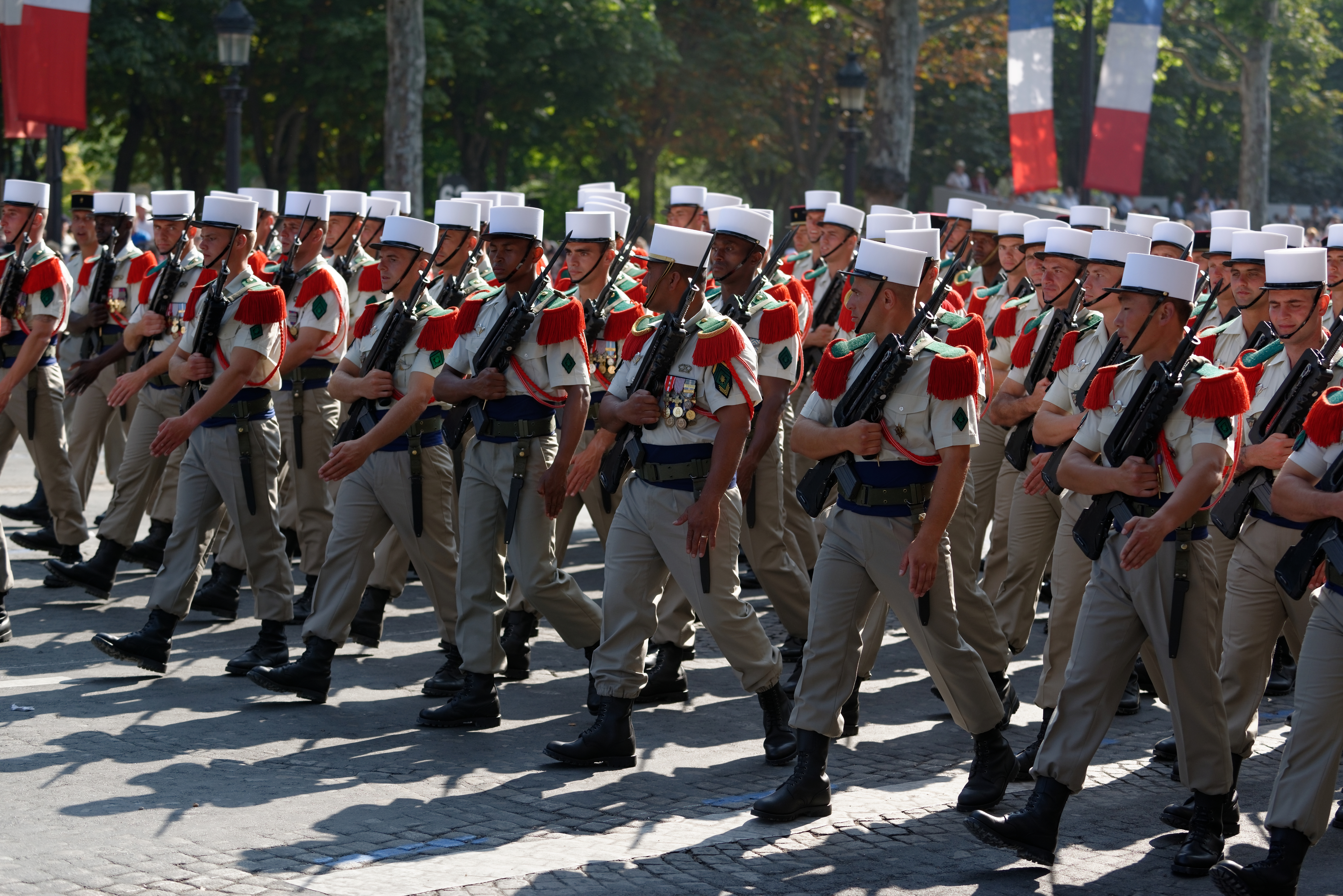
Because of its slower pace, the Foreign Legion is always the last unit marching in any parade

Also notable is the marching pace of the Foreign Legion. In comparison to the 116-step-per-minute pace of other French units, the Foreign Legion has an 88-step-per-minute marching speed. It is also referred to by Legionnaires as the "crawl". This can be seen at ceremonial parades and public displays attended by the Foreign Legion, particularly while parading in Paris on 14 July (Bastille Day Military Parade). Because of the impressively slow pace, the Foreign Legion is always the last unit marching in any parade. The Foreign Legion is normally accompanied by its own band, which traditionally plays the march of any one of the Foreign Legion's regiments, except that of the unit actually on parade. The regimental song of each unit and "Le Boudin" is sung by legionnaires standing at attention. Also, because the Foreign Legion must always stay together, it does not break formation into two when approaching the presidential grandstand, as other French military units do, in order to preserve the unity of the Legion.

Contrary to popular belief, the adoption of the Foreign Legion's slow marching speed was not due to a need to preserve energy and fluids during long marches under the hot Algerian sun. Its exact origins are unclear, but the official explanation is that although the pace regulation does not seem to have been instituted before 1945, it hails back to the slow marching pace of the Ancien Régime, and its reintroduction was a "return to traditional roots". This was in fact, the march step of the Foreign Legion's ancestor units – the Régiments Étrangers or Foreign Regiments of the Ancien Régime French Army, the Grande Armée's foreign units, and the pre-1831 foreign regiments.

=== Marching songs ===
==== "Le Boudin" ====
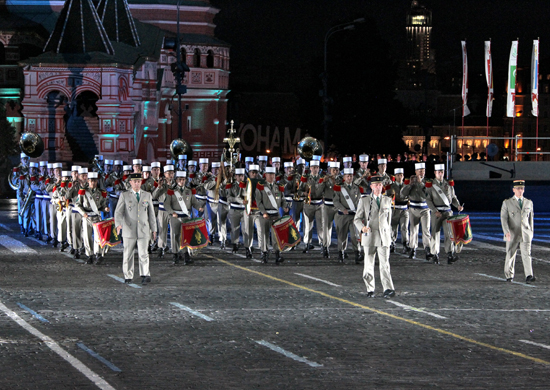
The Foreign Legion has its own military band

"Le Boudin" is the marching song of the Foreign Legion.

==== Other songs ====
- "Non, Je Ne Regrette Rien", 1st Foreign Parachute Regiment
- "Sous Le Ciel de Paris", The Choir of the French Foreign Legion
- "Anne Marie du 3^{e}" REI (in German)
- "Adieu, adieu"
- "Aux légionnaires"
- "Anne Marie du 2^{e} REI"
- "Adieu vieille Europe"
- "Chant de l'Oignon"
- "Chant du quatrième escadron"
- "Chez nous au 3e"
- "C'est le 4"
- "Connaissez-vous ces hommes"
- "Contre les Viêts" (song of the 13th Demi-Brigade of the Foreign Legion after having been the marching song adopted by the 1st Foreign Parachute Regiment)
- "Cravate verte et Képi blanc"
- "Dans la brume, la rocaille"
- "Défilé du 3^{e} REI"
- "C'était un Edelweiss"
- "Écho"
- "En Afrique"
- "En Algérie" (1^{er} RE)
- "Es steht eine Mühle" (in German)
- "Eugénie"
- "Les Képis Blancs" (1^{e} RE)
- "Honneur, Fidélité"
- "Ich hatt' einen Kameraden" (in German)
- "Il est un moulin"
- "J'avais un camarade"
- "Kameraden (in German)"
- "La colonne" (1^{er} REC)
- "La Légion marche" (2^{e} REP)
- "La lune est claire"
- "Le Caïd"
- "Le Chant Des Marais"
- "Il y a des cailloux sur toutes les routes"
- "Le fanion de la Légion"
- "Le Soleil brille"
- "Le front haut et l'âme fière" (5^{e} RE)
- "Légionnaire de l'Afrique"
- "Massari Marie"
- "Monica"
- "Sous le Soleil brûlant d'Afrique" (13^{e} DBLE)
- "Nous sommes tous des volontaires" (1^{er} RE)
- "Nous sommes de la Légion"
- "La petite piste"
- "Pour faire un vrai légionnaire"
- "Premier chant du 1^{er} REC"
- "Quand on an une fille dans l'cuir"
- "Rien n'empêche" (2^{er} REG)
- "Sapeur, mineurs et bâtisseurs" (6^{e} REG)
- "Soldats de la Légion étrangère"
- "Souvenirs qui passe"
- "Suzanna"
- "The Windmill"
- "Venu volontaire"
- "Véronica"

== Uniform ==
From its foundation until World War I the Foreign Legion normally wore the uniform of the French line infantry for parade with a few special distinctions. Essentially this consisted of a dark blue coat (later tunic) worn with red trousers. The field uniform was often modified under the influence of the extremes of climate and terrain in which the Foreign Legion served. Shakos were soon replaced by the light cloth kepi, which was far more suitable for North African conditions. The practice of wearing heavy capotes (greatcoats) on the march and vestes (short hip-length jackets) as working dress in barracks was followed by the Foreign Legion from its establishment. One short lived aberration was the wearing of green uniforms in 1856 by Foreign Legion units recruited in Switzerland for service in the Crimean War. In the Crimea itself (1854–1859) a hooded coat and red or blue waist sashes were adopted for winter dress, while during the Mexican Intervention (1863–1865) straw hats or sombreros were sometimes substituted for the kepi. When the latter was worn it was usually covered with a white "havelock" (linen cover) – the predecessor of the white kepi that was to become a symbol of the Foreign Legion. Foreign Legion units serving in France during the Franco-Prussian War of 1870–1871 were distinguishable only by minor details of insignia from the bulk of the French infantry. However subsequent colonial campaigns saw an increasing use of special garments for hot weather wear such as collarless keo blouses in Tonkin 1884–1885, khaki drill jackets in Dahomey (1892) and drab covered topees worn with all-white fatigue dress in Madagascar (1895).

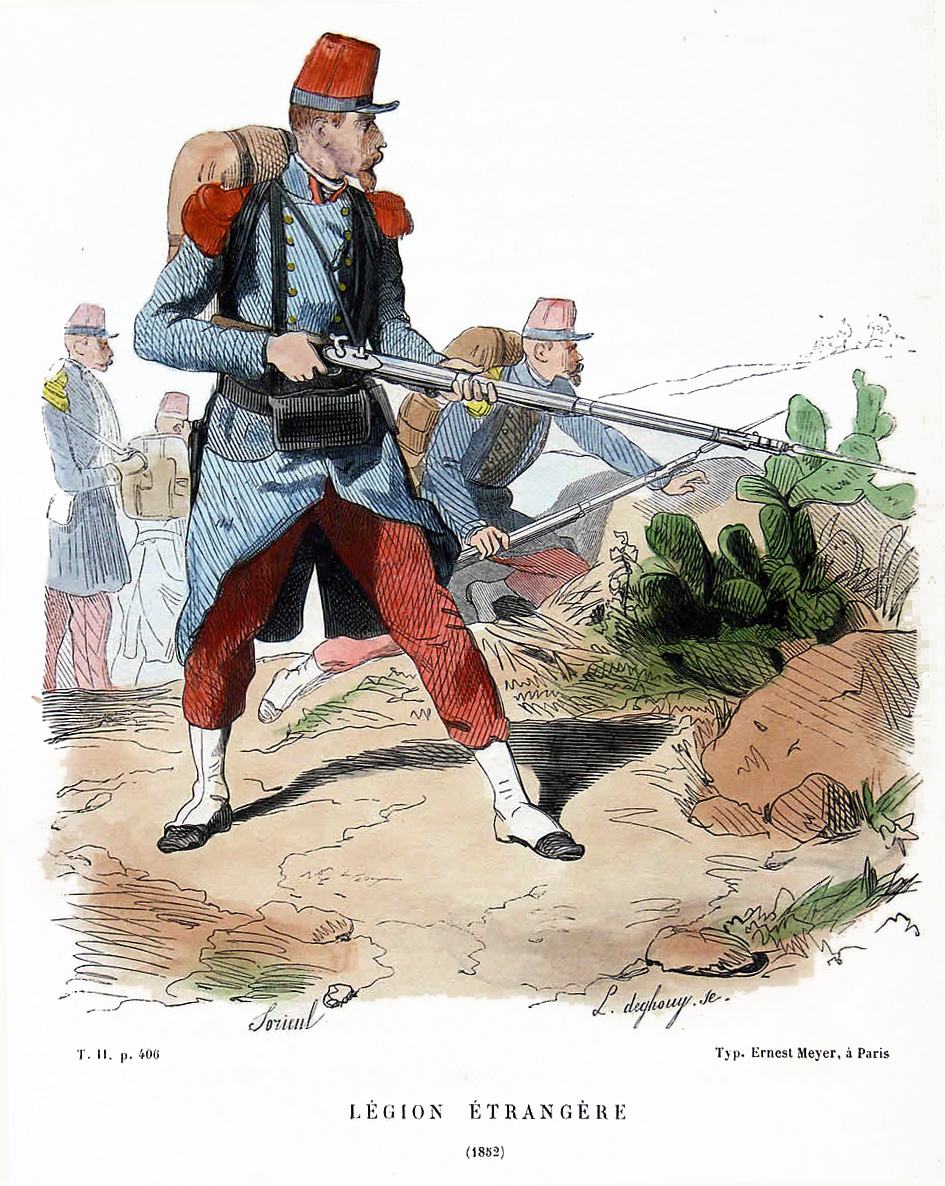
The Légion étrangère in 1852

In the early 20th century the legionnaire wore a red kepi with blue band and piping, dark blue tunic with red collar, red cuff patches, and red trousers. Distinctive features were the green epaulettes (replacing the red of the line) worn with red woollen fringes; plus the embroidered Legion badge of a red flaming grenade, worn on the kepi front instead of a regimental number. In the field a light khaki cover was worn over the kepi, sometimes with a protective neck curtain attached. The standard medium-blue double breasted greatcoat (capote) of the French infantry was worn, usually buttoned back to free the legs for marching. From the 1830s the legionnaires had worn a broad blue woollen sash around the waist, like other European units of the French Army of Africa (such as the Zouaves or the Chasseurs d'Afrique), while indigenous units of the Army of Africa (spahis and tirailleurs) wore red sashes. White linen trousers tucked into short leather leggings were substituted for red serge in hot weather. This was the origin of the "Beau Geste" image.

In barracks a white bleached kepi cover was often worn together with a short dark blue jacket ("veste") or white blouse plus white trousers. The original kepi cover was khaki and due to constant washing turned white quickly. The white or khaki kepi cover was not unique to the Foreign Legion at this stage but was commonly seen amongst other French units in North Africa. It later became particularly identified with the Foreign Legion as the unit most likely to serve at remote frontier posts (other than locally recruited tirailleurs who wore fezzes or turbans). The variances of climate in North Africa led the French Army to the sensible expedient of letting local commanders decide on the appropriate "tenue de jour" (uniform of the day) according to circumstances. Thus a legionnaire might parade or walk out in blue tunic and white trousers in hot weather, blue tunic and red trousers in normal temperatures or wear the blue greatcoat with red trousers under colder conditions. The sash could be worn with greatcoat, blouse or veste but not with the tunic. Epaulettes were a detachable dress item worn only with tunic or greatcoat for parade or off duty wear.

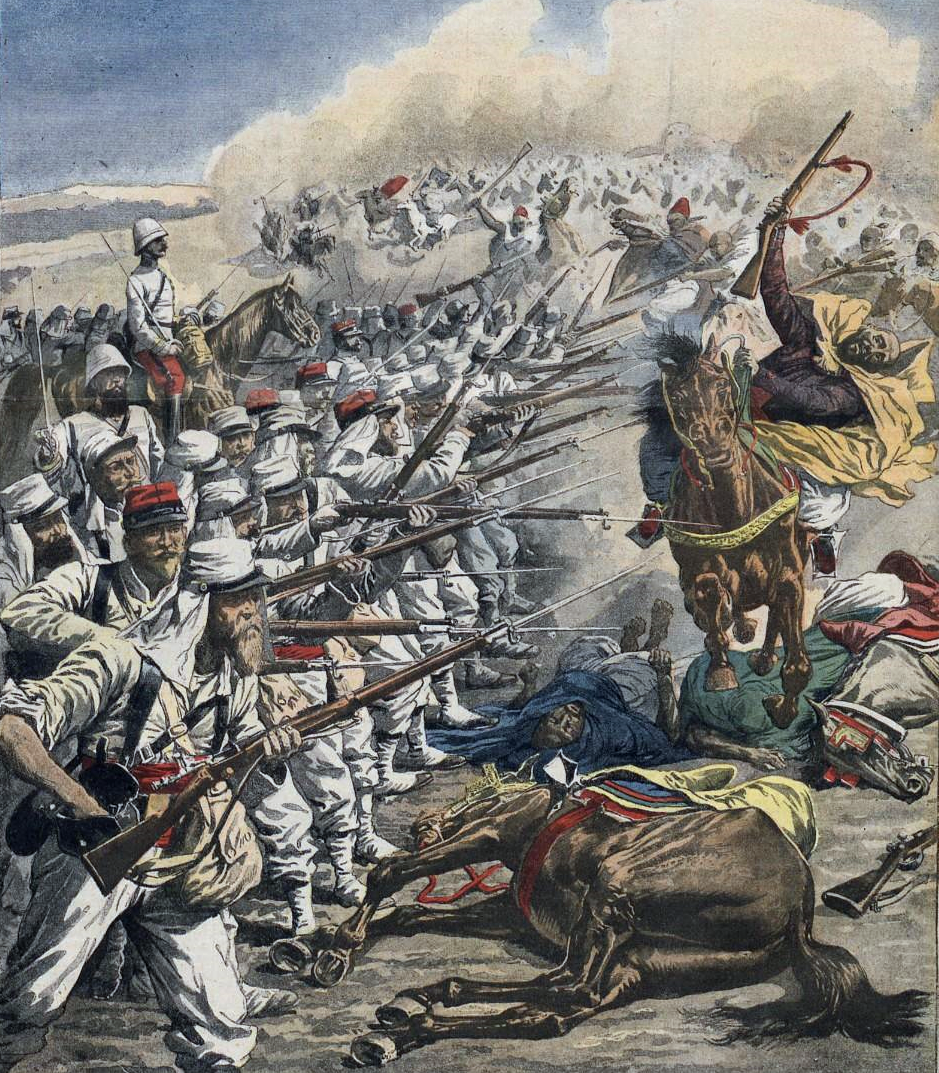
A drawing showing French Foreign Legion troops in action against tribesmen in Morocco in 1908

Officers wore the same dark blue (almost black) tunics as those of their colleagues in the French line regiments, except that black replaced red as a facing colour on collar and cuffs. Gold fringed epaulettes were worn for full dress and rank was shown by the number of gold rings on both kepi and cuffs. Trousers were red with black stripes or white according to occasion or conditions. All-white or light khaki uniforms (from as early as the 1890s) were often worn in the field or for ordinary duties in barracks. Non-commissioned officers were distinguished by red or gold diagonal stripes on the lower sleeves of tunics, vestes and greatcoats. Small detachable stripes were buttoned on to the front of the white shirt-like blouse.

Prior to 1914 units in Indo-China wore white or khaki Colonial Infantry uniforms with Foreign Legion insignia, to overcome supply difficulties. This dress included a white sun helmet of a model that was also issued to Foreign Legion units serving in the outposts of Southern Algeria, though never popular with its wearers. During the initial months of World War I, Foreign Legion units serving in France wore the standard blue greatcoat and red trousers of the French line infantry, distinguished only by collar patches of the same blue as the capote, instead of red. After a short period in sky-blue the Foreign Legion adopted khaki, in common with other units of the Armée d'Afrique, with steel helmets, from early 1916. A mustard shade of khaki drill had been worn on active service in Morocco from 1909, replacing the classic blue and white. The latter continued to be worn in the relatively peaceful conditions of Algeria throughout World War I, although increasingly replaced by khaki drill. The pre-1914 blue and red uniforms could still be occasionally seen as garrison dress in Algeria until stocks were used up about 1919.

During the early 1920s plain khaki drill uniforms of a standard pattern became universal issue for the Foreign Legion with only the red and blue kepi (with or without a cover) and green collar braiding to distinguish the Legionnaire from other French soldiers serving in North African and Indo-China. The neck curtain ceased to be worn from about 1915, although it survived in the newly raised Foreign Legion Cavalry Regiment into the 1920s. The white blouse (bourgeron) and trousers dating from 1882 were retained for fatigue wear until the 1930s.

At the time of the Foreign Legion's centennial in 1931, a number of traditional features were reintroduced at the initiative of the then commander Colonel Rollet. These included the blue sash and green/red epaulettes. In 1939 the white covered kepi won recognition as the official headdress of the Foreign Legion to be worn on most occasions, rather than simply as a means of reflecting heat and protecting the blue and red material underneath. The Third Foreign Infantry Regiment adopted white tunics and trousers for walking-out dress during the 1930s and all Foreign Legion officers were required to obtain full dress uniforms in the pre-war colours of black and red from 1932 to 1939.

During World War II the Foreign Legion wore a wide range of uniform styles depending on supply sources. These ranged from the heavy capotes and Adrian helmets of 1940 through to British battledress and American field uniforms from 1943 to 1945. The white kepi was stubbornly retained whenever possible.

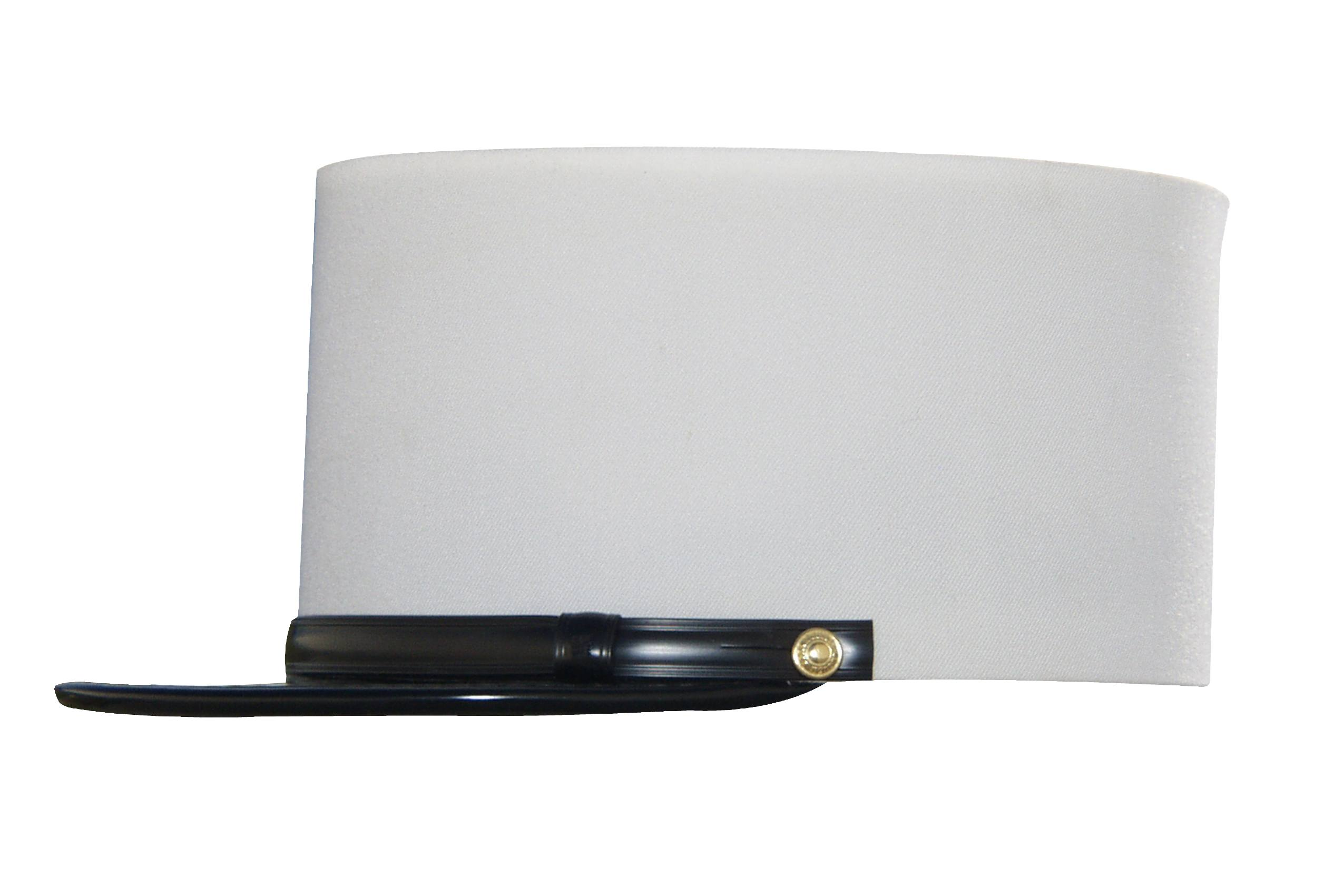
White kepi (Képi blanc) of the Foreign Legion

From 1940 until 1963 the Foreign Legion maintained four Saharan Companies (Compagnies Sahariennes) as part of the French forces used to patrol and police the desert regions to the south of Morocco and Algeria. Special uniforms were developed for these units, modeled on those of the French officered Camel Corps (Méharistes) having prime responsibility for the Sahara. In full dress these included black or white zouave style trousers, worn with white tunics and long flowing cloaks. The Legion companies maintained their separate identity by retaining their distinctive kepis, sashes and fringed epaulettes.

The white kepis, together with the sash and epaulettes survive in the Foreign Legion's modern parade dress. Since the 1990s the modern kepi has been made wholly of white material rather than simply worn with a white cover. Officers and senior noncommissioned officers still wear their kepis in the pre-1939 colours of dark blue and red. A green tie and (for officers) a green waistcoat recall the traditional branch colour of the Foreign Legion. From 1959 a green beret (previously worn only by the legion's paratroopers) became the universal ordinary duty headdress, with the kepi reserved for parade and off duty wear. Other items of currently worn dress are the standard issue of the French Army.

== Equipment ==
The Legion is basically equipped with the same equipment as similar units elsewhere in the French Army. These include:

- The FAMAS assault rifle, a French-made automatic bullpup-style rifle, chambered in the 5.56×45mm NATO round. The FAMAS is being replaced by the Heckler & Koch HK416. The 13e DBLE, was the first French Army regiment to use the new rifle.
- The SPECTRA is a ballistic helmet, designed by the French military, fitted with real-time positioning and information system, and with light amplifiers for night vision.
- The FÉLIN suit, an infantry combat system that combines ample pouches, reinforced body protections and a portable electronic platform.

== Command ==
=== French Foreign Legion command (1931–1984) ===
==== Inspector Tenure ====
Inspection de la Légion étrangère (I.L.E)

Name	Rank	Tenure
Paul-Frédéric Rollet	Général	1931–1935
Raoul Magrin-Vernerey	Général	1948–1950

==== Autonomous Group Tenure ====
Groupement autonome de la Légion étrangère (G.A.L.E)

Name	Rank	Tenure
Jean Olié	Général	1950
Paul Gardy	Général	1951

==== Command Tenure ====
Commandement de la Légion étrangère (C.O.L.E)

Name	Rank	Tenure	Note
René Lennuyeux	Général	1955	colonel then Général

==== Technical Inspection Tenure ====
Inspection technique de la Légion étrangère (I.T.L.E)

Name	Rank	Tenure
René Lennuyeux	Général	1957
Paul Gardy	Général	1958
René Morel (Légion étrangère)	Général	1960
Jacques Lefort	Général	1962

==== Groupment Tenure ====
Groupement de la Légion étrangère (G.L.E)

Name	Rank	Tenure
Marcel Letestu	Général	1972
Gustave Fourreau	Général	1973
Bernard Goupil	Général	1976
Paul Lardry	Général	1980
Jean-Claude Coullon	Général	1982

=== Commandement de la Légion Étrangère (1984–present) ===
==== Command Tenure ====
Commandement de la Légion étrangère (C.O.M.L.E)

#	Name	Rank	Tenure
1	Jean-Claude Coullon	Général	1984
2	Jean Louis Roué	Général	1985
3	Raymond Le Corre	Général	1988
4	Bernard Colcomb	Général	1992
5	Christian Piquemal	Général	1994
6	Bernard Grail	Général	1999
7	Jean-Louis Franceschi	Général	2002
8	Bruno Dary	Général	2004
9	Louis Pichot de Champfleury	Général	2006
10	Alain Bouquin	Général	2009
11	Christophe de Saint-Chamas	Général	2011
12	Jean Maurin	Général	2014
13	Denis Mistral	Général	2018
14	Alain Lardet	Général	2020
15	Cyrille Youchtchenko	Général	2023
16	Christophe Passerat de La Chapelle	Général	2026

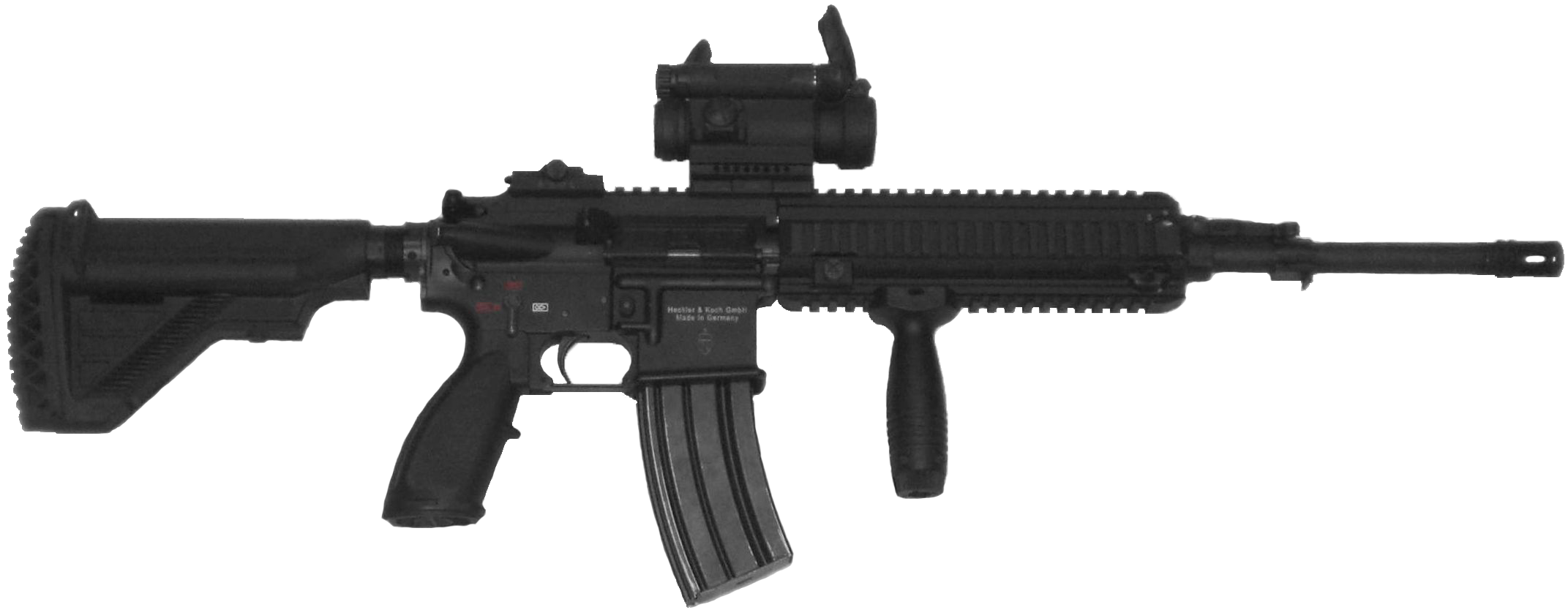
The HK416F is the new service rifle of the French Armed Forces

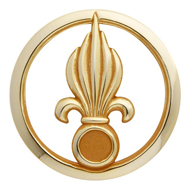
Beret badge of the Foreign Legion (old model).

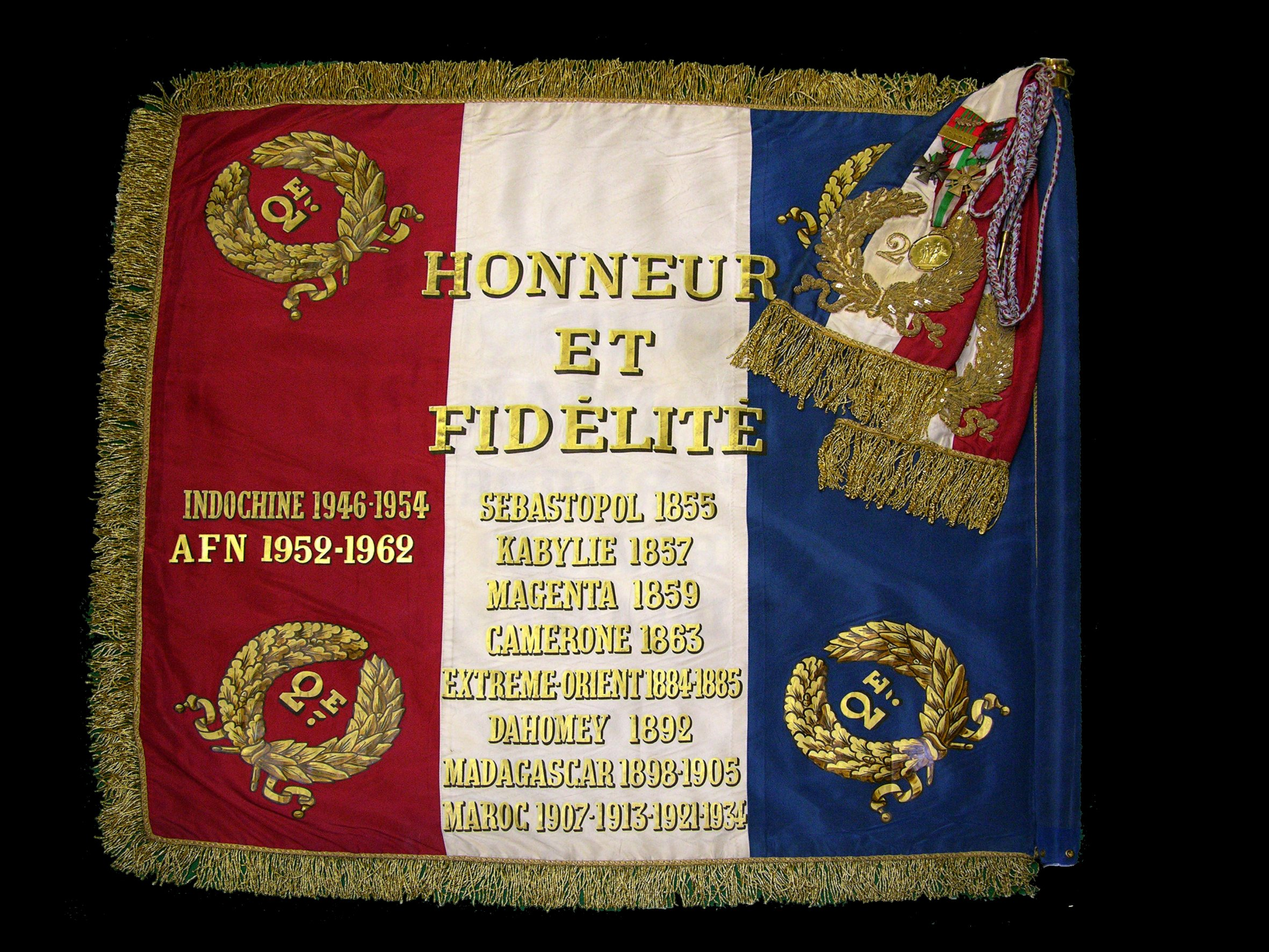
Honneur et Fidélité is the motto of the Foreign Legion in the French Armed Forces, inscribed on its flags from 1920.

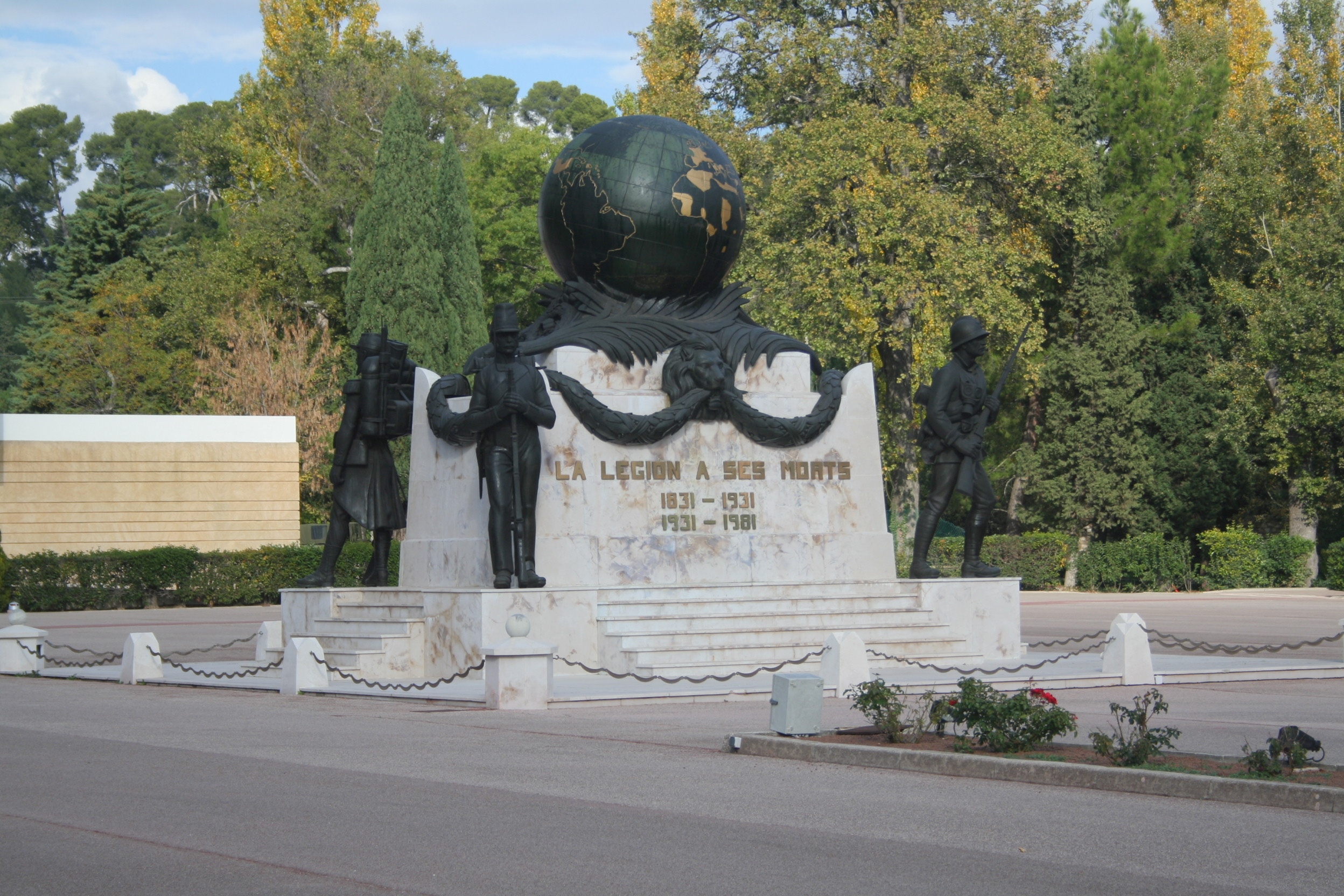
The monument to the Legionnaires at Aubagne. The gold portions of the globe mark countries where the legion has previously been deployed. It is inscribed La Legion A Ses Morts (From The Legion to its dead)

== Legacy ==
Beyond its reputation as an elite unit often engaged in serious fighting, the recruitment practices of the Foreign Legion have also led to a somewhat romanticised view of it being a place for disgraced or "wronged" men looking to leave behind their old lives and start new ones. This view of the legion has been used for dramatic effect in many films, not the least of which are the several versions of Beau Geste, whose author P.C. Wren claimed, not without dispute, to have served in the legion himself. In Evelyn Waugh's Brideshead Revisited, Sebastian Flyte's German companion, Kurt, has dishonourably left the Foreign Legion. Three songs by Edith Piaf, most notably "Non, je ne regrette rien" (No, I regret nothing), became associated with the legion, during the 1960s when members of the Legion were accused of being implicated in a failed coup d'état during the Algerian War. Today it is still a popular Legion "chant" sung when on parade, adapting it to their unique marching cadence of 88 steps to the minute. Various fictional portrayals and references to the legion have been made over the years, such as in film, television, music, video games and art. The comic strip Crock, which depicted life in the legion, ran from 1975 to 2012.

=== Emulation by other countries ===
==== Chinese Ever Victorious Army ====
The Ever Victorious Army was the name given to a Chinese imperial army in the late 19th century. Commanded by Frederick Townsend Ward, the new force originally comprised about 200 mostly European mercenaries, recruited in the Shanghai area from sailors, deserters and adventurers. Many were dismissed in the summer of 1861, but the remainder became the officers of the Chinese soldiers recruited mainly in and around Sungkiang (Songjiang). The Chinese troops were increased to 3,000 by May 1862, all equipped with Western firearms and equipment by the British authorities in Shanghai. Throughout its four-year existence the Ever Victorious Army was mainly to operate within a thirty-mile radius of Shanghai. It was disbanded in May 1864 with 104 foreign officers and 2,288 Chinese soldiers being paid off. The bulk of the artillery and some infantry transferred to the Chinese Imperial forces. It was the first Chinese army trained in European techniques, tactics, and strategy.

==== Israeli Mahal ====
In Israel, Mahal (Hebrew: מח"ל, an acronym for Mitnadvei Ḥutz LaAretz, which means Volunteers from outside the Land [of Israel]) is a term designating non-Israelis serving in the Israeli military. The term originates with the approximately 4,000 both Jewish and non-Jewish volunteers who went to Israel to fight in the 1948 Arab–Israeli War including Aliyah Bet. The original Mahalniks were mostly World War II veterans who had previously served in the American and British armed forces.

Today, there is a program, Garin Tzabar, within the Israeli Ministry of Defense that administers the enlistment of non-Israeli citizens in the country's armed forces. Programs enable foreigners to join the Israel Defense Forces if they are of Jewish descent (which is defined as at least one grandparent).

==== Rhodesian Light Infantry and 7 Independent Company ====
During the Rhodesian Bush War of the 1960s and 1970s, the Rhodesian Security Forces enlisted volunteers from overseas on the same pay and conditions of service as locally based regulars. The vast majority of the Rhodesian Army's foreigners joined the Rhodesian Light Infantry (RLI), a heliborne commando regiment with a glamorous international reputation; this unit became colloquially known as the "Rhodesian foreign legion" as a result, even though foreigners never made up more than about a third of its men. According to Chris Cocks, an RLI veteran, "the RLI was a mirror of the French Foreign Legion, in that recruiters paid little heed as to a man's past and asked no questions. ... And like the Foreign Legion, once in the ranks, a man's past was irrelevant." Just as French Foreign Legionnaires must speak French, the Rhodesian Army required its foreigners to be English-speakers. Many of them were professional soldiers, attracted by the regiment's reputation—mostly former British soldiers, or Vietnam veterans from the United States, Australian and New Zealand forces—and these became a key part of the unit. Others, with no military experience, were often motivated to join the Rhodesian Army by their opposition to communism, or a desire for adventure or to escape the past.

After the Rhodesians' overseas recruiting campaign for English-speakers, started in 1974, proved successful, they began recruiting French-speakers as well, in 1977. These francophone recruits were placed in their own unit, 7 Independent Company, Rhodesia Regiment, which was commanded by French-speaking officers and operated entirely in French. The experiment was not generally considered a success by the Rhodesian commanders, however, and the company was disbanded in early 1978.

==== Russian "Foreign Legion" ====
In 2010 the service conditions of the Armed Forces of the Russian Federation changed to allow foreigners. The actual term Russian "Foreign Legion" is a colloquial expression without any official recognition. Under the plan, foreigners without dual citizenship are able to sign up for five-year contracts and will be eligible for Russian citizenship after serving three years. Experts say the change opens the way for Commonwealth of Independent States citizens to get fast-track Russian citizenship, and counter the effects of Russia's demographic crisis on its army recruitment.

==== Donetsk & Luhansk Peoples Republic "Novo-Russia Foreign Legion" ====
During the war in Donbas, the separatist Donetsk People's Republic recruited foreigners who were ideologically aligned to Russia to come fight for them. This resulted in the formation of the Novo-Russia Foreign Legion, with hundreds of foreigners having reportedly joined its ranks. Ukraine reported that in 2015 around 30,000 foreign fighters were fighting for the separatists with the main nationalities being Russian and Serbian, with westerners making up a minority of fighters.

==== Spanish "Foreign Legion" ====
The Spanish Tercio de Extranjeros was created in 1920, in direct emulation of the French Foreign Legion. It subsequently had a significant role in Spain's colonial wars in Morocco and in the Spanish Civil War on the Nationalist side. The Spanish Foreign Legion recruited foreigners until 1986 but unlike its French model, the number of non-Spanish recruits never exceeded 25%, most of these from Latin America. It is now called the Spanish Legion and has been involved in several modern conflicts and operations, including Afghanistan and the UN Mission in Lebanon UNIFIL.

==== Ukrainian International Legion & Georgian Legion ====
The Georgian Legion was formed fighting on the side of Ukraine in the war in Donbas and the Russo-Ukrainian War. The unit was organized in 2014, and in 2016 it was transferred under the control of the Ukrainian Army, under the 25th Mechanized Infantry Battalion "Kyiv Rus". Although formed by mostly ethnic Georgian volunteers, and commanded by veteran Georgian officer Mamuka Mamulashvili, the legion was noted as being particularly good at recruiting Americans; before the formation of the International Legion of Ukraine in 2022, most foreign fighters served the Georgian Legion.

In response to the 2022 Russian invasion of Ukraine, the government of Ukraine quickly established a component of its Territorial Defense Forces consisting of volunteers from foreign countries. Within the International Legion, some single nationality battalions were established to avoid language barriers in order to facilitate their rapid response to the invasion.

== Notable members ==
The following is a list of notable people who are or were members of the Foreign Legion:

- Avraham Golan, security contractor
- Jean Danjou – Commander at the Battle of Camarón.
- Mamady Doumbouya – Guinean military officer who led the 2021 Guinean coup d'état and is currently President of Guinea
- Roger Faulques
- Peter I of Serbia
- Ante Gotovina
- Ante Roso
- Aarne Juutilainen
- Taylor Cavanaugh
- Jean-Marie Le Pen
- Patrice MacMahon
- Peter Ortiz
- George Edward Massee
- Alan Seeger
- Charles Sweeny
- Susan Travers
- Aly Khan
- Ernst Jünger
- Henri, Count of Paris (1908–1999)
- Prince Aage, Count of Rosenborg – A Danish Prince who served in the Foreign Legion and died with the rank of lieutenant-colonel.
- Louis, Prince Napoléon
- Željko Glasnović
- Simon Murray

== See also ==
- List of French paratrooper units
- Brigade of Gurkhas
- List of battles involving the French Foreign Legion
- Foreign Legion Museum
- Flight of the Wild Geese – Irish soldiers who fought for France
- List of militaries that recruit foreigners
- Spanish Legion
- International Legion
- International Brigades
- Place des États-Unis § Memorial to the American volunteers
- Lafayette Escadrille, a World War I volunteer air squadron
- Beau Geste, a novel (with many film adaptations)
- James Waddell (army officer), a New Zealander, highly decorated officer
