= List of commanders of the Foreign Legion =

The following is a list of all of the commanders of the Foreign Legion (Légion étrangère)

== Commanders of the Foreign Legion ==
=== Commanders of Foreign Legion Command (COMLE) ===
No.	Rank	Name	Command began	Command ended	Country of origin	Campaigns
11	Général de brigade	Christophe de Saint Chamas	2011	201x	France	
10	Général de division	Alain Bouquin	2009	2011	France	
9	Général de brigade	Louis Pichot de Champfleury	2006	2008	France	
8	Général de brigade	Bruno Dary	2004	2006	France	
7	Général de brigade	Franscheschi	2002	2004		
6	Général de brigade	Bernard Grail	1999	2002		
5	Général de brigade	Christian Piquemal	1994	1999		
4	Général de brigade	Bernard Colcomb	1992	1994		
3	Général de brigade	Raymond Le Corre	1988	1992		
2	Général de brigade	Jean Louis Roué	1985	1988		
1	Général de brigade	Coullons	1984	1985		

=== Commanders of Groupement de la Légion étrangère (GLE) ===
No.	Rank	Name	Command began	Command ended	Country of origin	Campaigns
	Général de brigade	Coullons	1982	1984		
	Général de brigade	Paul Louis Joseph Lardry	1980	1982		
		Bernard Goupil	1976	1980		
		Gustav Fourreau	1973	1976		
		Marcel Letestu	1972	1973	France	

== Commanders of the 1st Foreign Regiment ==
=== Commanders of the 1st Foreign Regiment of the Foreign Legion (1841-1856) ===
No.	Rank	Name	Command began	Command ended	Country of origin	Campaign
9	Colonel	Martenot de Cordoue	1855	1855		
8	Colonel	Levy	1855	1855		
7	Colonel	Vienot	1854	1855		
6	Colonel	Bazaine	1851	1854		
5	Colonel	Lesueur de Givry	1850	1851		
4	Colonel	Émile Henry Mellinet	March 15, 1846	December 2, 1850	France	
3	Colonel	Mouret	1843	1846		
2	Colonel	Despinoy	1842	1843		Algeria
1	Colonel	de Mollenbeck	1841	1842		

== Commanders of the 1st Foreign Parachute Regiment ==
No.	Rank	Name	Command began	Campaign
Commandant(Major)	Jeanpierre	1955	1956	
Lieutenant Colonel	Brothier	1956	1957	
Lieutenant Colonel	Jeanpierre	1957	1958	
Lieutenant Colonel	Brothier	1958	1959	
Lieutenant Colonel	Dufour	1959	1960	
Lieutenant Colonel	Guiraud	1960	1961	

== Commanders of the 2nd Foreign Cavalry Regiment ==
The 2nd Foreign Cavalry Regiment existed from 1939 to 1940 and 1946 to 1962; during its existence the regiment was led by ten different officers.

Rank	Name	Command began	Command ended
Lieutenant-Colonel	Baldini	1961	1962
Lieutenant-Colonel	de Coatgoureden	1960	1961
Lieutenant-Colonel	Ogier de Baulny	1957	1960
Lieutenant-Colonel	Legendre	1955	1957
Lieutenant-Colonel	Renucci	1953	1955
Lieutenant-Colonel	Berchet	1952	1953a
Lieutenant-Colonel	de Chazelles	1948	1952
Lieutenant-Colonel	Lennuyeux	1946	1948
Regiment disbanded in 1940. Regiment reestablished in 1946.
Commandant (Chef d'Escadrons)	Billon	1940	1940
Colonel	Farine	1939	1940

== Commanders of the 2nd Foreign Engineer Regiment ==
The 2nd Foreign Engineer Regiment is the youngest of all the regiments of the Foreign Legion having been established on July 1, 1999.

No.	Rank	Name	Command began	Command ended	Country of origin	Campaign
14	Colonel	Paul Lemaire	2025			
13	Colonel	Guillaume Roy	2023	2025		
12	Colonel	Emmanuel Combe	2021	2023		
11	Colonel	Antoine Faurichon de la Bardonnie	2019	2021		
10	Colonel	Grégoire Potiron de Boisfleury	2017	2019		
9	Colonel	Guillaume de Sercey	2015	2017		
8	Colonel	Jean-Christophe Reussner	2013	2015		
7	Colonel	Frédéric Bonini	2011	2013		
6	Colonel	Philippe Kirscher	2009	2011		
5	Colonel	Benoît Chavanat	2007	2009		
4	Colonel	Frédéric Boucher	2005	2007		
3	Colonel	Jacques Fradin	2003	2005		
2	Colonel	Francis Autran	2001	2003		
1	Colonel	Pascal Nebois	July 1, 1999	2001		

== Commanders of the 2nd Foreign Infantry Regiment ==
=== Commander of the 2nd Foreign Regiment ===
Following the Crimean War, the elements of the two regiments which had participated in the war returned to Algeria and were consolidated into a single regiment thereafter referred to as the 2nd Foreign Regiment.

No.	Rank	Name	Command began	Command ended	Country of origin	Campaigns/Battles
4	Colonel	Pierre Joseph Jeanningros	1862	1862	France	
3		Butet	1859	1862		
2			1859	1859		
1	Colonel	Marie Louis Henry de Granet-Lacroix de Chabrières	1856	1859	France	

=== Commanders of the 2nd Regiment of the Foreign Legion (1841-1855) ===
No.	Rank	Name	Command began	Command ended	Country of origin	Campaigns/Battles
9		Marie Louis Henry de Granet-Lacroix de Chabrières	May 29, 1855	1855	France	
8	Colonel	de Caprez	1851	1855	France	Crimean War
7		Cœur	1851	1851	France	
6	Colonel	Jean-Luc Carbuccia	1848	July 17, 1851	Bastia	
5		de Noue	1848	1848		
4	Colonel	François Certain de Canrobert	March 31, 1849	1848	France	Algeria
3	Colonel	Caries de Senilhes	1844	1848		Algeria
2		Patrice de Mac Mahon	1843	1844	France	
1	Colonel	Caries de Senilhes	1841	1843		

== Commanders of the 2nd Foreign Parachute Regiment ==
No.	Rank	Name	Command began	Command ended	Country of origin	Campaign
30	Colonel	Benoît Desmuelles	2012	201x	France	Mali- Operation Serval
29	Colonel	François Plessy	2010	2012	France	
28	Colonel	E. Bellot des Minières	2008	2010	France	Afghanistan- Task Force Altor
27	Colonel	B. Houdet	2006	2008	France	Chad- Operation Epervier
26	Colonel	Paulet	2004	2006		RCI Opération Licorne
25	Colonel	Maurin	2002	2004		2002-2003: RCI Operation Licorne
24	Colonel	Alain Bouquin	2000	2002	France	2001: Kosovo - Mitrovica
23	Lieutenant-colonel	Prevost	1998	2000		1998: Chad - Operation Epervier; 1999: Bosnia - Operation Salamander and Operation West Star; 1999: Senegal - Operation Caya
22	Colonel	Benoît Puga	1996	1998	France	1996: Brazzaville - Operation Malebo; 1996 - 1997: Bangui - Operation Almandin II; 1997: Brazzaville - Operation Pelican
21	Colonel	Bruno Dary	1994	1996	France	1995 - 1996: Bosnia - Operation SALAMANDER; 1996: Chad - Operation EPERVIER
20	Colonel	Chicken	1992	1994		1992-1993: Somalia - Operation Restore Hope; 1992-1993 : Former Yugoslavia - UNPROFOR; 1994: Chad - Operation Epervier
19	Colonel	Gausseres	1990	1992		1990: Rwanda - Operation Noroit 1990-1991: Chad - Operation Epervier; 1991: Iraq - Operation Daguet; 1991: Djibouti - Operation Godoria; 1992: Djibouti - Operation Iskoutir
18	Colonel	Coevoet	1988	1990		1988: Operation EPERVIER 1990 : GABON - Operation Requin
17	Colonel	Wabinski	1986	1988		
16	Colonel	Germanos	1986	1988		1986: Chad - Operation EPERVIER
15	Lieutenant-colonel	Janvier	1984	1986		1982: Lebanon - Operation Killer Whale; 1984: Chad - Operation Manta
14	Colonel	Guignon	1982	1984		
13	Lieutenant-colonel	Jean Louis Roué	1978	1980		
12	Lieutenant-colonel	Erulin	1976	1978		1978: Kolwezi - Operation Bonite; 1978: Chad - Operation Tacaud IV
11	Lieutenant-colonel	Brette	1974	1976		
10	Lieutenant-colonel	Goupil	1972	1976		
9	Lieutenant-colonel	Dupoux	1970	1972		
8	Lieutenant-colonel	Jeannou Lacaze	1967	1970	French Indochina	1969 : Chad - Operation Tacaud 1; 1967: Arrival in Calvi
7	Lieutenant-colonel	Paul Arnaud de Foïard	1965	1967	France	
6	Lieutenant-colonel	Caillaud	1963	1965		
5	Lieutenant-colonel	Chenel	1961	1963		
4	Lieutenant-colonel	Darmuzai	1960	1961		
3	Colonel	Jacques Lefort	1958	1960		
2	Chef de bataillon	Masselot	February 1958	April 1958		
1	Lieutenant-colonel	Devismes	1955	1958		

== Commanders of the 3rd Foreign Infantry Regiment ==
=== Commanders of the 3rd REI from 1945 to Present ===
No.	Rank	Name	Command began	Command ended	Country of origin	Campaign
	Colonel	Bourdoncle de Saint-Salvy	2009	---		

=== Commanders of the 3rd REI between 1920 and 1942 ===
No.	Rank	Name	Command began	Command ended	Country of origin	Campaign
8	Colonel	Levêque	1941	1942		
7	Colonel	Lales	1939	1941		
6	Colonel	Mantoz	1936	1939		
5	Colonel	Brillat-Savarin	1932	1936		
4	Colonel	Michet de la Baume	1928	1932		
3	Lieutenant-colonel	Blanc	1926	1928		
2	Lieutenant-colonel	François	1925	1925		
1	Lieutenant-colonel	Paul Frederick Rollet	1920	1925	France	

== Commanders of the 4th Foreign Regiment ==
=== Commanders of the 4th Foreign Regiment ===
No.	Rank	Name	Command began	Command ended	Country of origin
	Colonel	Mistral	2009	Present	
	Colonel	Pau	2007	2009	
	Colonel	Roqueplo	2005	2007	
	Colonel	Kochin	2003	2007	
	Colonel	Thiebault	2001	2003	

== Commanders of the 5th Foreign Infantry Regiment ==
=== Commanders of the 5th Foreign Infantry Regiment (1931-1945) ===
No.	Rank	Name	Command began	Command ended
	Colonel	Jean Belloc	1943	
	Colonel	Marcel Alessandri	1941	1943

== Commanders of the 6th Foreign Infantry Regiment ==
=== Commanders of the 6th Foreign Infantry Regiment (1939-1941) ===
No.	Rank	Name	Command began	Command ended
3	Lieutenant-colonel	Delore	October 1941	December 31, 1941
2	Lieutenant-colonel	Ferdinand Barre	December 20, 1939	October 1941
1	Colonel	Imhaus	October 1, 1939	December 20, 1939

=== Commanders of the 6th Foreign Infantry Regiment (1949-1955) ===
No.	Rank	Name	Command began	Command ended
3	Chef de Battalion	Georgeon		July 7, 1955
2	Lieutenant-colonel	Rossi		
1	Lieutenant-Colonel	Babonneau René	April 1, 1949	

== Commanders of the Old Legion ==
The Old Foreign Legion was established on March 9, 1831 and for the next several years the Legion quickly cycled through a number of officers until it was deployed to Spain to fight in the First Carlist War, after that deployment the pace of the change of leadership slowed down as the Foreign Legion enjoyed the leadershiper of able and skilled officers. However following taking catastrophic losses in Spain the French government at the time thought it best to disband this organization.

No.	Rank	Name	Command began	Command ended	Country of origin	Campaigns/Battles
	Lieutenant-colonel	Andrè Camille Ferray				
	Colonel	Joseph Conrad (French colonel)	November 1836	June 2, 1837†		Algeria; First Carlist War; Battle of Barbastro
	Colonel	Jean-Louis Lebeau				First Carlist War
	Colonel	Joseph Jean-Nicolas Bernelle			France	Algeria; First Carlist War
3	Colonel					
2	Colonel	Michel Combe	April 1, 1832	September 1832		
1	Colonel	Baron Christophe Anton von Stoffle	1831	April 1, 1832	Switzerland	

== Commanders of 13th Demi-Brigade ==
Rank	Name	Command began	Command ended	Country of origin	Campaign
Colonel	Burkhart	July 29, 2008			
Colonel	Marchand	July 29, 2006	July 29, 2008		
Lieutenant-colonel	Henry Billaudel	2004	July 29, 2006		
Colonel	Chavancy	2002	2004		
Colonel	Jean Maurin	2000	2002		
Lieutenant-colonel	Debleds	1998	2000		
Lieutenant-colonel	Emmanuel Beth	1996	1998		
Colonel	JP Perez	1994	1996		
Colonel	Ibanez	1992	1994		
Lieutenant-colonel	Le Flem	1988	1990		
Lieutenant-colonel	Champeau	1986	1988		
Lieutenant-colonel	Rideau	1984	1986		
Lieutenant-colonel	Vialle	1982	1984		
Lieutenant-colonel	Loridon	1980	1982		
Lieutenant-colonel	Gillet	1978	1980		
Lieutenant-colonel	Jean-Claude Coullon	1976	1978		
Lieutenant-colonel	Paul Lardy	1974	1976		
Lieutenant-colonel	Jean Pêtre	1972	1974		
Lieutenant-colonel	Alexis Bounfils	July 14, 1970	July 17, 1972		
Lieutenant-colonel	Gustave Fourreau	1968	July 14, 1970		
Lieutenant-colonel	Hugh Geoffrey	1965	1968		
Lieutenant-colonel	Robert Lacôte	1962	1965		
Lieutenant-colonel	Dupuy de Querezieux	July 11, 1961	August 23, 1962		
Lieutenant-colonel	Albéric Vaillant	February 7, 1961	July 11, 1961		
Lieutenant-colonel	Robert Roux	1958	1961		
Lieutenant-colonel	Maurice Senges	1957			

== Commanders of the Foreign Legion Detachment in Mayotte ==
Rank	Name	Command began	Command ended
Lieutenant-colonel	Schiffer	2009	Present
Lieutenant-colonel	Compin	2007	2009
Lieutenant-colonel	Broda	2005	2007
Lieutenant-colonel	Denis Belivard	2003	2005
Lieutenant-colonel	Patrick Munoz	2001	2003
Lieutenant-colonel	Patrick Esteve	1999	2001
Lieutenant-colonel	Mauguen	1997	1999
Lieutenant Colonel	George Bernard Bon	1995	1997
Lieutenant-colonel	Henri Cormier	1993	1995
Lieutenant-colonel	Bernard Dufour	1991	1993
Lieutenant-colonel	Philippe Bouvattier	1989	1991
Lieutenant-colonel	Bourgogne	1987	1989
Lieutenant-colonel	Caseneuve	1985	1987
Lieutenant-colonel	Savalle	1983	1985
Lieutenant-colonel	Pingault	1981	1983
Lieutenant-colonel	Bargoin	1979	1981
Lieutenant-colonel	Sabarrere	1977	1979
Lieutenant-colonel	Racaud	1976	1977
Captain	Grandjean	1973	1976
