= Jean Olié =

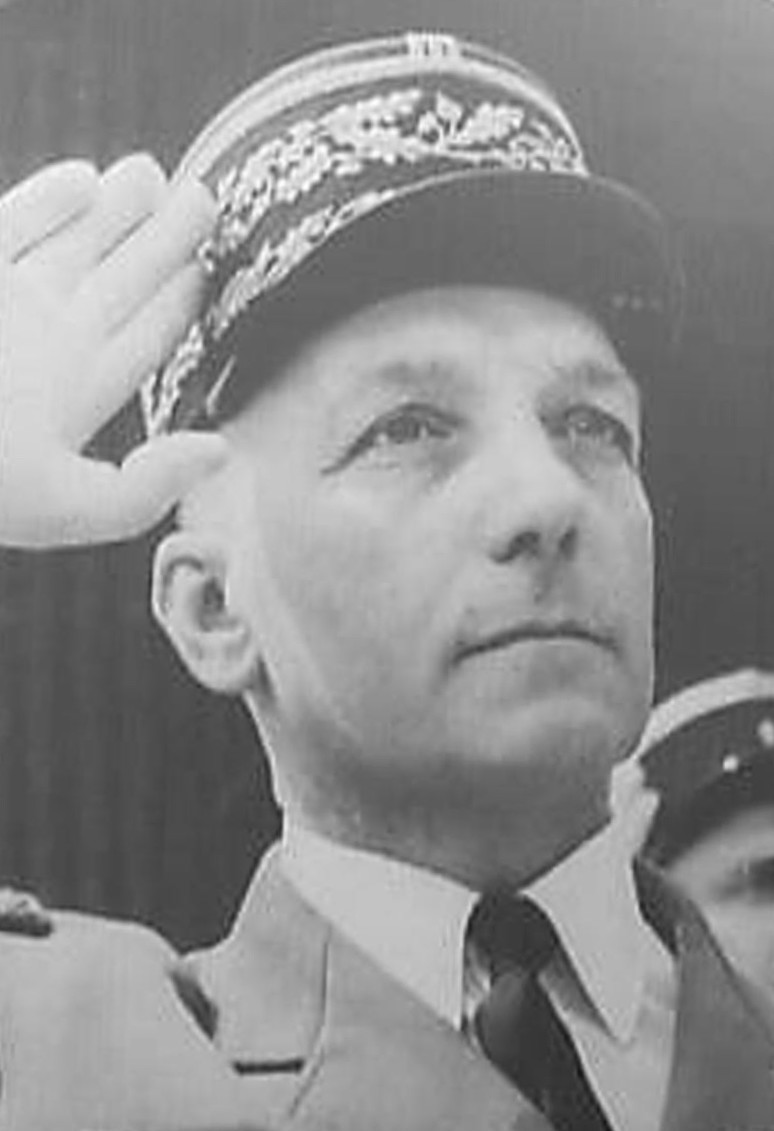
- Born: 24 March 1904; France
- Died: 2003 (age 99)
- Allegiance: France
- Branch: French Army
- Service years: 1924 – 1961
- Rank: Général d'armée
- Commands: 1st Foreign Infantry Regiment; Marching Regiment of the Foreign Legion; 3rd Foreign Infantry Regiment; 1st Inspector of the Autonomous Group of the Foreign Legion (1950); President Military Cabinet Chief; CEMP-P.R. Secretariat-General for National Defence and Security; SGDSN
- Conflicts: World War II

Jean Olié (24 March 1904 – 2003) was a Général of the French Army and the 1st Inspector of the Autonomous Group of the Foreign Legion serving primarily in the Foreign Legion from 1924 to 1961.

== Military career ==
Jean entered the École spéciale militaire in 1924, and was a commissioned a Sous-lieutenant in 1926 (Rif promotion).

Jean was assigned to the 28th Chasseur Battalion à Pied (French: 28^{e} Bataillon de Chasseur à Pied) on 2 October 1926.

Promoted to the rank of lieutenant on 1 October 1928, Jean served in the 4th Foreign Regiment 4^{e} R.E. on 10 July 1931 and with the Goums (French: Les Goums; light infantry units of the Army of Africa) where he acquired a great deal of cultural knowledge and was an expert connaisseur around Muslim affairs.

Placed hors cadre, on 20 October 1933, at the title of special services of North Africa. He was placed at the disposition resident commissioner general in Morocco.

He was promoted to captain on 25 December 1935.

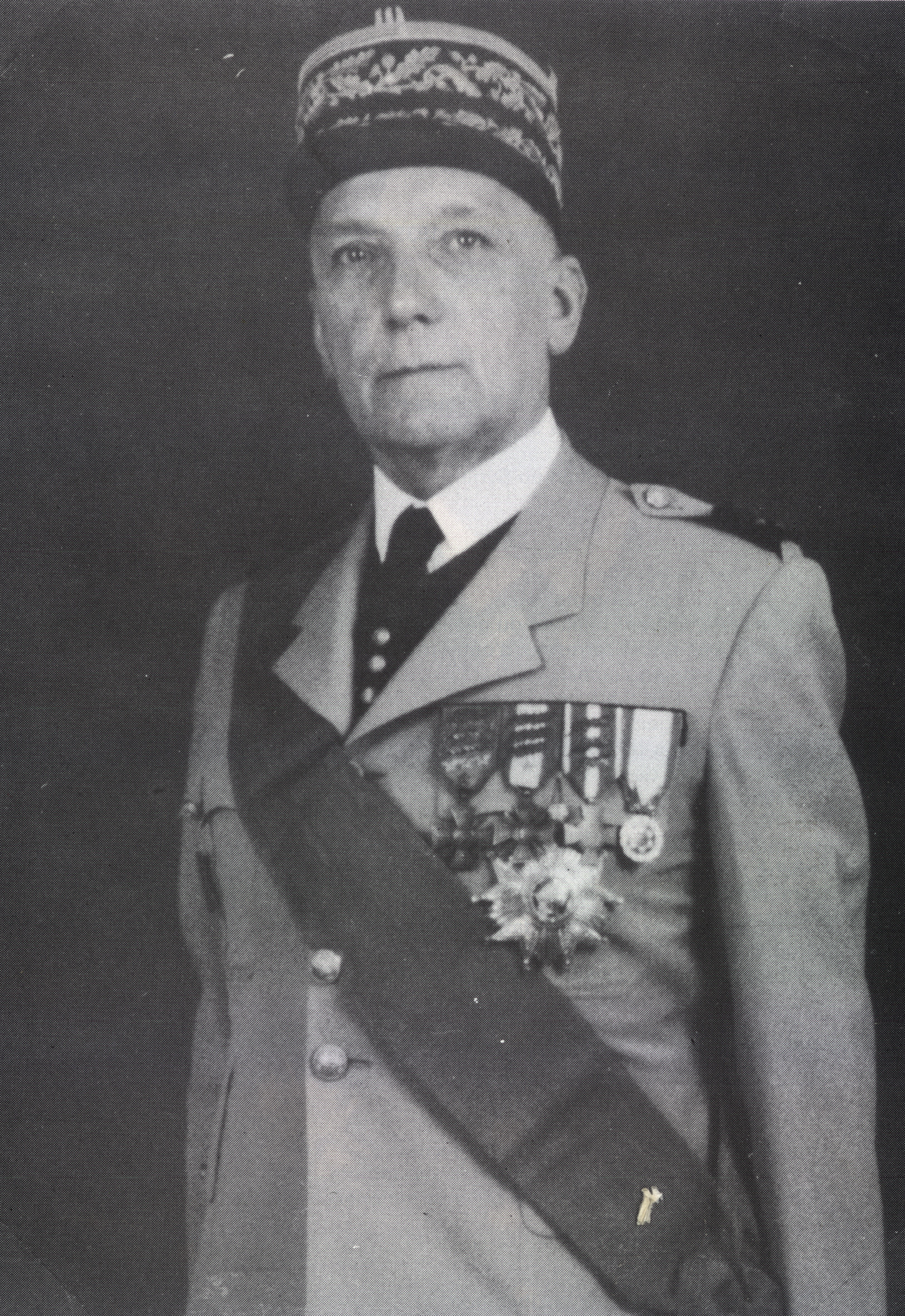
Portrait of French général Jean Olié.

Assigned on 7 December 1936, to the directorate of political affairs at Rabat. He joined the 46th Infantry Regiment (French: 46^{e} Régiment d'Infanterie) on 1 September 1939.

On 1 November 1940, he was assigned to the mobilization of the general staff headquarters of the 41st Division (French: 41^{e} Division).

On 25 December 1941, he was promoted to the rank of Chef de bataillon (Commandant - Major).

In armistice leave on 9 April 1942, he was recruited at the corps of the indigenous affairs controllers of Morocco. Reintegrated in the armistice army on 16 August 1942, he was placed hors cadres at the general staff headquarters of the 15th Military Division.

Detached on 1 December 1942 to the 1^{e} RCA, he then was designated as the general secretariat of the region of Rabat, on 24 March 1943.

On 25 September 1943, he was nominated as a lieutenant-colonel.

Detached again, on 23 January 1944, to the 1^{e} RCA.

He was assigned to the general staff headquarters of the 3rd Army Corps (French: 3^{e} Corps d'Armee) of 7 February 1944, then at the general staff headquarters of Army B, on 14 September 1944, as chief of the 3rd bureau of the 1st French Army.

In 1944, he took command of the Marching Regiment of the Foreign Legion RMLE (French: Régiment de marche de la Légion étrangère, R.M.L.E) towards the end of the war, succeeding regimental commander Lieutenant-colonel Louis-Antoine Gaultier.

He was chief of the cabinet of general commandant of the 1st French Army (French: 1^{re} Armée Française), from 24 November 1944, then chief of the general staff headquarters of the 3rd Armored Division (French: 3^{e} Division Blindée), on 18 January 1945.

He was promoted to the rank of colonel on 25 January 1945.

He entered to general cabinet, Inspector General of the Army, on 10 May 1946. Commandment of the territories of Agadir-Confins, on 31 May 1947, then, general secretariat of the region of Rabat, on 31 December 1947 and director of indigenous affairs course, on 30 August 1950.

He assumed command of the Autonomous Group of the Foreign Legion in 1950, and was succeeded by his second in command, général Paul Gardy.

Admitted to the 1st section of officer generals on 1 January 1953.

Military cabinet of the general, commissioner general resident of France in Morocco, on 31 August 1954. He was designated as the Commandant the École spéciale militaire and École militaire interarmes of Saint-Cyr from 1954 to 1956.

He was then nominated as the civilian and military governor of grand Kabylie on 28 August 1956.

He was promoted to Général de division on 1 March 1957.

On 9 August 1958, Jean Olié was put at the disposition of general director of the institute of high studies of national defense (French: institut des hautes études de la défense nationale) and center of high military studies (French: centres des hautes études militaires).

Elevated to the rank and designation of Général de corps d'armée on 1 January 1959.

He assumed command of the army corps of Constantine on 30 March 1960.

Elevated to the rank and designation of Général d'armée on 8 September 1960.

In 1961, he served simultaneously as Chief of the Military Staff of the President of the Republic of France (French: État-major particulier du président de la République Française), as well as the Secretariat-General for National Defence and Security (French: Secrétariat général de la défense et de la sécurité nationale).

Jean Olié ended his service as of 1 November 1961. He was admitted by anticipation in the 2nd section of officer generals.

On 30 April 1975, he was the ceremonial chief of the Legion's commemoration of Camarón.

== Recognitions and Honors ==

- Grand Croix de la Légion d'honneur
- Croix de guerre 1939-1945 (4 palms)
- Croix de guerre des théâtres d'opérations extérieures (3 palms)
- Croix de la Valeur militaire (3 palms)
- Médaille du sauvetage
- Chevalier de l'ordre du Mérite agricole
- Médaille des évadés
- Distinguished Service Order (U.K)
- Bronze Star Medal (U.S.)
- Honorary Battlefield Badge (French: Honneur du champ de bataille) (U.S.)
- Mérite Militaire Chérifien

He totalized 14 citations and is a Caporal-Chef d'Honneur (Honorary Senior Corporal) of the French Foreign Legion.

== See also ==
- Major (France)
- French Foreign Legion Music Band (MLE)
- Moroccan Division
- Saharan Méharistes Companies (méharistes sahariennes)
- Jacques Lefort
- Pierre Darmuzai
- René Lennuyeux
