= Fourreau =

Fourreau (pronounced [fuʁo]) is a French surname from Pays de la Loire, chiefly Mayenne, and surrounding areas. It is derived from the French word for 'sheath', originally designating a sheath-maker. Notable people with the surname include:

- Emma Fourreau (born 1999), French politician
- Gustave Fourreau (1920–1994), French Army official
- Jules Pierre Fourreau (1844–1871), French botanist
