= René Morel =

René Morel may refer to:

- René A. Morel (1932–2011), luthier
- René Morel (athlete) (1912–1978), French middle-distance runner
- René Morel (Légion étrangère) (1908–1974), French Army officer
