= Piquemal =

Piquemal is a French surname. Notable people with the surname include:

- Christian Piquemal (born 1940), French military officer
- Claude Piquemal (born 1939), French athlete
- François Piquemal, French politician and educator
- Michel Piquemal (born 1947), French conductor
