= Foreign Legion Command =

Command of the Foreign Legion

- Commandement de La Légion Étrangère
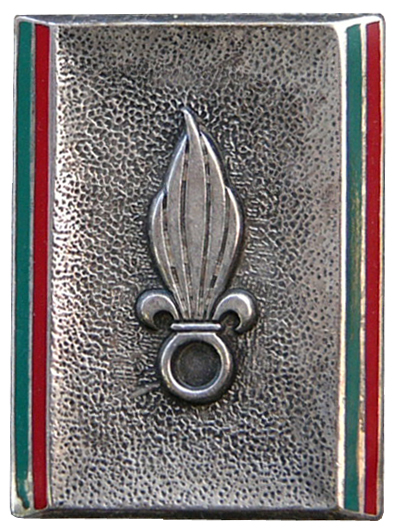
- Active: Commandement de La Légion Étrangère (1931 - 1984); Commandement de La Légion Étrangère; C.O.M.L.E (1984 - present)
- Country: France
- Branch: French Army
- Type: Command
- Role: Headquarters
- Headquarters: Aubagne, France
- Mottos: Honneur et Fidélité; Legio Patria Nostra
- Colors: Green and Red
- Battle honours: Camerone 1863

Commanders
- Commandant: Brigadier General Cyrille Youchtchenko
- Notable commanders: Paul-Frédéric Rollet

Insignia
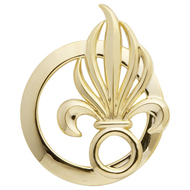
- Beret badge of the Foreign Legion Command
- Abbreviation: C.O.M.L.E

The Foreign Legion Command (French: Commandement de la Légion Étrangère, (COMLE)) (official) is the Command of the Foreign Legion in the French Army.

The Legion is led by a French general, a Legion officer (French: Officier de Légion) who is usually a general who spent his entire career in Legion units. COMLE also includes the general staff headquarters of the foreign legion command (French: L’Etat-major du COMLE)(official), led by another senior officer, chief of the general staff headquarters of the foreign legion command (French: Chef de L’Etat-major du COMLE) (official). As of 2017, the general staff headquarters of the foreign legion command includes several divisions related to the functioning of the Legion. The general staff headquarters of the foreign legion command has adopted various inspecting, grouping, and commanding designations since 1931 and has been designated officially as C.O.M.L.E since 1984. The Général de division commanding the Legion, also known as Father of the Legion (French: Le Père Légion) or Foreign Legion Command Chief (French: Chef COMLE) (official) is a direct subordinate of the Chief of Staff of the French Army (C.E.M.A.T). The Division Général is also the technical counselor commanding for the ensemble related to the Legion (recruitment, traditions, employment, regimental formations and security).

The Divisional general commanding the Legion, commands also the 1st Foreign Regiment, the 4th Foreign Regiment and the Foreign Legion Recruiting Group (G.R.L.E). The GRLE was not formed till 2007. The commands of the C.O.M.L.E division general commandant extends to:

- Guardian of Legion Esprit de Corps, Legion Patrimony and Legion Traditions
- Guardian Protector of Personnel Serving at Foreign Status
- Command of General Personnel Administration Operations
- Command of Training and Instructing Procedure Implementations
- Guardian of Legion Communities

The Music of the Foreign Legion (MLE) is led by the Music Chief.

== History ==
The Legion is part of the History of France. it was created by a King, combat engaged at Camarón under an Emperor and has known to endure the most heavy losses under the Republic.

=== Pionniers & Legion Regiments ===
| Regiment | Regiment Insignia | Legion Regimental Command |
|---|---|---|
| 1st Foreign Regiment, (1^{er} R.E); Foreign Legion Tenure (1841 - present) | | Foreign Legion Regiment - 1^{er} RE Colonel; Legion Pionniers Sections of Tradition; C.O.M.L.E Exclusive Command |
| 4th Foreign Regiment, (4^{e} R.E); Foreign Legion Tenure (1920 - present) | | Foreign Legion Regiment - 4^{e} RE Colonel; Legion Pionniers Groups; C.O.M.L.E Exclusive Command |
| Foreign Legion Recruiting Group, (G.R.L.E); Foreign Legion Tenure (2007 - present) | | Foreign Legion Regiment - GRLE Colonel; C.O.M.L.E Command |
| 1st Foreign Cavalry Regiment, (1^{er} R.E.C); Foreign Legion Tenure (1920 - present) | | Foreign Legion Regiment - 1^{er} REC Colonel; Regiment part of the French 6th Light Armoured Brigade |
| 1st Foreign Engineer Regiment (1^{er} R.E.G); Foreign Legion Teunure (1999 - present) | | Foreign Legion Regiment - 1^{er} REG Colonel; Legion Pionniers Groups; Airborne Combat Engineers; Regiment part of the 6th Light Armoured Brigade |
| 2nd Foreign Infantry Regiment, (2^{e} R.E.I); Foreign Legion Tenure (1841 - present) | | Foreign Legion Regiment - 2^{e} REI Colonel; Regiment part of the French 6th Light Armoured Brigade |
| 2nd Foreign Parachute Regiment, (2^{e} R.E.P); Foreign Legion Tenure (1948 - present) | | Foreign Legion Regiment - 2^{e} REP Colonel; Commando Parachute Group; Regiment part of the French 11th Parachute Brigade |
| 2nd Foreign Engineer Regiment, (2^{e} R.E.G); Foreign Legion Tenure (1999 - present) | | Foreign Legion Regiment - 2^{e} REG Colonel; Legion Pionniers Groups; Airborne Combat Engineers; Regiment part of the French 27th Mountain Infantry Brigade |
| 3rd Foreign Infantry Regiment, (3^{e} R.E.I); Foreign Legion Tenure (1945 - present) former Marching Regiment of the Foreign Legion, (R.M.L.E); Foreign Legion Tenure (1915-1920) - (1942-1945) | | Foreign Legion Regiment - 3^{e} REI Colonel; Legion Pionniers Groups; Regiment part of territorial command of French Army |
| 13th Demi-Brigade of the Foreign Legion, (13^{e} D.B.L.E); Foreign Legion Tenure (1940 - present) | | Foreign Legion Regiment - 13^{e} DBLE Colonel; Regiment part of the French 6th Light Armoured Brigade |
| Foreign Legion Detachment in Mayotte, (D.L.M.E); Foreign Legion Teunure (1973 - present) | | Foreign Legion Detachment - DLME Colonel; Legion Pionniers Groups; Detachment part of the territorial command of the French Army |

== Creation and different nominations (1931-1984) ==
The command of the Foreign Legion is stationed at quartier Vienot in Aubagne alongside the 1st Foreign Regiment. The headquarters detachment was established in 1984 following the reorganization of the previous Foreign Legion Group (G.L.E). Foreign Legion Command is headed by a Général.

- On March 2, 1931; the Inspection of the Foreign Legion (I.L.E) (French: Inspection de la Légion étrangère, I.L.E) was created.
- Between 1934 and 1935, the I.L.E was dissolved.
- In 1948, the I.L.E is recreated.
- On September 1, 1950; the I.L.E was dissolved and the Autonomous Group of the Foreign Legion (G.A.L.E) (French: Groupement Autonome de la Légion étrangère, G.A.L.E) is created.
- On July 1, 1955; the Foreign Legion Command (C.O.L.E) (French: Commandement de la Légion étrangère) was created.
- On September 16, 1957; the C.O.L.E. became the Technical Inspection of the Foreign Legion (I.T.L.E.) (French: Inspection Technique de la Légion étrangère).
- On July 1, 1964; the I.T.L.E. was dissolved.
- On September 1, 1972, creation of the Foreign Legion Groupment (G.L.E) (French: Groupement de Légion étrangère) which included the Operational Group of the Foreign Legion (G.O.L.E.) (French: Groupement Opérationnel de la Légion étrangère).
- On July 1, 1984, the G.L.E became the Foreign Legion Command (C.O.M.L.E) (French: Commandement de la Légion étrangère).

== History of the garrisons, campaigns and battles ==
During the interwar period on April 1, 1931, while the Legion reached requirements of 30,000 Legionnaires, général Paul-Frédéric Rollet, was entrusted with the post of Inspector of the Foreign Legion newly created in Tlemcen in Algeria. It is at this moment that the Communal Depot of the Foreign Regiments (D.C.R.E.) was created. This Inspector of the Foreign Legion was dissolved with the retirement of the Father of the Legion.

In 1948, the Inspection was recreated for 2 years under the command of Général de division Raoul Magrin-Vernerey. Again dissolved in 1950, the inspection unit left way for the Autonomous Group of the Foreign Legion (G.A.L.E.) commanded consecutively by Générals Jean Olié and Paul Gardy which had the attributions of Inspector General. The G.A.L.E. was made up of a headquarter staff at Sidi bel-Abbès, the Communal Depot of the Legion, the 1st Foreign Infantry Regiment which included all training/ instruction units, the intelligence service, and the Moral Service for Works of the Foreign Legion (French: Service du Moral et des œuvres de la Légion étrangère)(S.O.M.L.E.).

In 1954, at the end of the First Indochina War, the Foreign Legion was reorganized. The 1st Foreign Regiment inherited all the attributions of Legion units. The Foreign Legion Command (C.O.L.E.) was created on July 1, 1955 at Vincennes; with command ensured by Colonel René Lennuyeux. Two years later on September 16, 1957, the foreign legion command inherited the new naming of Technical Inspection of the Foreign Legion (I.T.L.E). This technical inspection was dissolved in 1964 and its attributions were transferred to the regimental commander of the 1st Foreign Regiment .

In 1972, after efforts by Colonel Marcel Letestu, a Foreign Legion Groupment (G.L.E) was created which was put at his disposition. Accordingly, Colonel Letestu has immediate authority on the 1st Foreign Regiment and the 2nd Foreign Regiment and conserved this prerogative of General Inspector. On the other hand, the commander of the (G.L.E) commanded also the 31st Brigade. This experimental unit, Legion dominated was among the first combined arms brigades. The 31st Brigade engaged in peacekeeping combat operations in Lebanon as part of the Multinational Force in Lebanon under the command of Foreign Legion Groupment (G.L.E) Général de brigade Jean-Claude Coullon. The 31st Brigade was subsequently replaced by the 6th Light Armoured Division in 1984 and then became designated as the 6th Light Armoured Brigade following the Gulf War as part of Division Daguet.

On July 1, 1984 the G.L.E. inherited the denomination of Foreign Legion Command (C.O.M.L.E.) (French: Commandement de la Légion étrangère).

== Organization ==
In the mission, the division general commanding the Foreign Legion is assisted by a general staff headquarters which service operations are based on the personnel of the 1st Foreign Regiment 1^{er} R.E and the Foreign Legion Recruiting Group (G.R.L.E). This general staff compromised as of the 2012 of the following Divisions and bureaux:

- Foreign Legion Human Resources Division (French: Division des Ressources Humaines, D.R.H.L.E): Division ensured the management of the ensemble administration of personnel serving at Foreign Status.
- Foreign Legion Recruiting Group, (French: Groupement de Recrutement de la Légion étrangère, G.R.L.E): responsible entity for Legion centers of information, Legion recruiting centers, as well as the Legion center of selection and incorporation.
- Foreign Legion Information Systems and Communication Division, (French: Division des Systèmes d'Information et de Communication, D.S.I.C.L.E): Division developed proper applications, administered networks and consulting in material of formation (Information Systems) for the Foreign Legion. The division also supported the Foreign Legion Service Handling of Information (French: Service de traitement de l'information de la Légion Étrangère, S.T.I.L.E).
- Foreign Legion Statistical and Personnel Protection Division (French: Division Statistiques et Protection du Personnel de la Légion étrangère, D.S.P.L.E): Division handled in material of protection and security, the ensemble of personnel serving at Foreign Status. This division participated at the selection process of candidates at engagement.
- Foreign Legion Communication and Information Division, (French: Division Communication et Information, D.I.C.L.E): Division in charge of institutional communication. This division ran public relations, the media, issue numbers production of Képi Blanc (French: Képi Blanc), the monthly of the legion, the administration of information technologies, as well audio cells.
- Foreign Legion History and Patrimony Division, (French: Division Histoire et Patrimoine, D.H.P.L.E): Division handled the conservation preservation and management of the foreign legion, and most notably the management of Foreign Legion Museum (French: Musée de la Légion étrangère).
- Foreign Legion Social Work and Aid Bureau, (French: Bureau d'Action Sociale et d'Entraide de la Légion étrangère, BASELE/FELE).

As of 2017, the general staff headquarters of the Foreign Legion Command (French: L'Etat-major du Commandement de la Légion Étrangère), at the disposition of the Commandant of the Legion, has undergone further organizational structuring and was articulated in various legion divisions revolving around: studies, pilotage and synthesis; human resources; security and protection; patrimony; solidarity and others.

== Commanders ==
=== Commandement de La Légion Étrangère (1931 - 1984) ===
Source:

=== Inspector Tenure of the Foreign Legion ===
Inspection de la Légion étrangère (I.L.E)

| Name | Portrait | Rank | Tenure | Note |
|---|---|---|---|---|
| Paul-Frédéric Rollet | | Général | 1931-1935 | 1st Foreign Regiment (1899-1909). Captain of the 3rd mounted combat company of the 1st marching battalion of the 2nd Foreign Regiment from 1909 to 1914. Lieutenant-Colonel Regimental Commander of the Marching Regiment of the Foreign Legion in 1917. Lieutenant-Colonel Regimental Commander of the 3rd Foreign Regiment (1920-1925). Colonel Regimental Commander of the 1st Foreign Regiment (1925-1931) until planning the 100th anniversary of the Legion on Camaron day of April 30, 1931. Founding Pillar Patron of the organization of the French Foreign Legion and constituents. Accumulated 41 years of military service out of which 33 years in the Legion. Honorary titled Father of the Legion or Le Père de la Légion. |
| Raoul Magrin-Vernerey | | Général | 1948-1950 | |

=== Autonomous Group Tenure of the Foreign Legion ===
Groupement autonome de la Légion étrangère (G.A.L.E)

| Name | Portrait | Rank | Tenure | Note |
|---|---|---|---|---|
| Jean Olié | | Général | 1950 | |
| Paul Gardy | - | Général | 1951 | |

=== Foreign Legion Command Tenure ===
Commandement de la Légion étrangère (C.O.L.E)

| Name | Portrait | Rank | Tenure | Note |
|---|---|---|---|---|
| René Lennuyeux | - | Général | 1955 | |

=== Technical Inspection Tenure of the Foreign Legion ===
Inspection technique de la Légion étrangère (I.T.L.E)

| Name | Portrait | Rank | Tenure | Note |
|---|---|---|---|---|
| René Lennuyeux | - | Général | 1957 | |
| Paul Gardy | - | Général | 1958 | |
| René Morel | - | Général | 1960 | |
| Jacques Lefort | - | Général | 1962 | |

=== Foreign Legion Groupment Tenure ===
Groupement de la Légion étrangère (G.L.E)

| Name | Portrait | Rank | Tenure | Note |
|---|---|---|---|---|
| Marcel Letestu | - | Général | 1972 | Sergent to Général |
| Gustave Fourreau | - | Général | 1973 | Caporal-Chef to Général |
| Bernard Goupil | - | Général | 1976 | Caporal-Chef to Général |
| Paul Lardry | - | Général | 1980 | |
| Jean-Claude Coullon | - | Général | 1982 | Caporal-Chef to Général |

=== Commandement de la Légion Étrangère - C.O.M.L.E - (1984 - present) ===
The Foreign Legion Groupment (G.L.E) became the Foreign Legion Command (C.O.M.L.E) under the command of Général de brigade Jean-Claude Coullon in 1984.

| No. | Portrait | Name (born–died) | Term of office | | | Ref. |
| No. | Portrait | Name (born–died) | Took office | Left office | Time in office | Ref. |
|---|---|---|---|---|---|---|
| 1 | | Général de brigade Jean-Claude Coullon (born 1929) | 1 July 1984 | 1 July 1985 | 1 year, 0 days | |
| 2 | | Général de division Jean Louis Roué (1933–2011) | 1 July 1985 | 1988 | 2–3 years | |
| 3 | | Général de division Raymond Le Corre (1933–2014) | 1988 | 1992 | 3–4 years | |
| 4 | | Général de division Bernard Colcomb (born 1937) | 1992 | 1994 | 1–2 years | |
| 5 | | Général de division Christian Piquemal (born 1940) | 1994 | 1 September 1999 | 4–5 years | |
| 6 | | Général de division Bernard Grail (born 1946) | 1 September 1999 | 1 August 2002 | 2 years, 334 days | |
| 7 | | Général de division Jean-Louis Franceschi (born 1947) | 1 August 2002 | 1 August 2004 | 2 years, 0 days | |
| 8 | | Général de division Bruno Dary (born 1952) | 1 August 2004 | 16 July 2006 | 1 year, 349 days | |
| 9 | | Général de brigade Louis Pichot de Champfleury (born 1954) | 16 July 2006 | 1 July 2009 | 2 years, 350 days | |
| 10 | | Général de division Alain Bouquin (born 1958) | 1 July 2009 | 1 September 2011 | 2 years, 62 days | |
| 11 | | Général de division Christophe de Saint-Chamas (born 1959) | 1 September 2011 | 1 August 2014 | 2 years, 334 days | |
| 12 | | Général de division Jean Maurin (born 1959) | 1 August 2014 | 1 August 2018 | 4 years, 0 days | |
| 13 | | Général de brigade Denis Mistral (born 1966) | 1 August 2018 | 1 August 2020 | 2 years, 0 days | |
| 14 | | Général de brigade Alain Lardet (born 1968) | 1 August 2020 | 20 July 2023 | 2 years, 353 days | |
| 15 | | Général de brigade Cyrille Youchtchenko (born 1967) | 20 July 2023 | Incumbent | 3 years, 82 days | |

== See also ==
- Majors of the Legion
- Chief of the Defence Staff
  - Chief of Staff of the French Army (French: Chef d'État-Major de l'Armée de Terre, CEMAT)
  - Chief of Staff of the French Navy (French: Chef d'État-Major de la Marine, CEMM)
  - Chief of Staff of the French Air Force (French: Chef d'État-Major de l'Armée de l'Air, CEMAA)
  - French Special Operations Command (French: Commandement des Opérations Spéciales (COS))
- Honneur et Fidélité
- Swiss Guard
- List of French paratrooper units
