= Letestu =

Letestu is a surname. Notable people with the surname include:

- Agnès Letestu (born 1971), French ballet dancer
- Mark Letestu (born 1985), Canadian ice hockey player
- Marcel Letestu (1918–2006), French Army officer
