= Colcombe =

Colcombe is a surname. Notable people with the surname include:

- Riché Colcombe, American politician
- Scott Colcombe (born 1971), English footballer

== See also ==
- Bernard Colcomb (born 1937), French military officer
- Colcombe Castle, East Devon, England
