= Foreign Legion Recruiting Group =

- Groupement de recrutement de la Légion étrangère (GRLE)
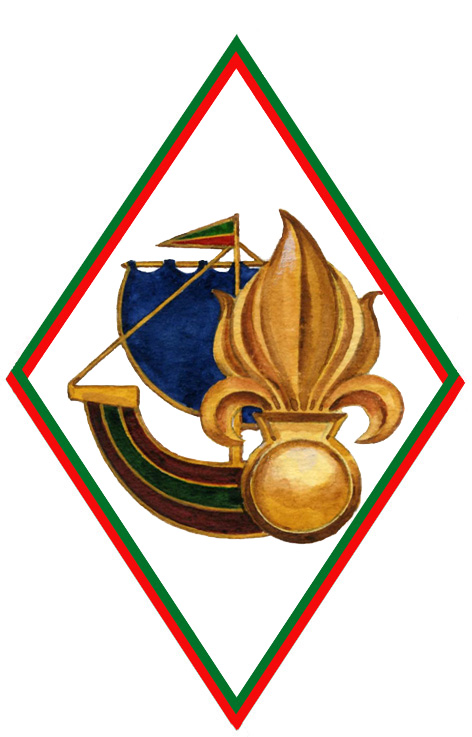
- GRLE Unit Badge
- Active: July 10, 2007- Present
- Country: France
- Branch: French Army
- Type: Regimental Military Unit
- Role: Recruitment and Support Operations
- Part of: Foreign Legion Command
- Headquarters: Fort de Nogent, Fontenay-sous-Bois, Paris, France
- Motto: Honneur et Fidélité
- Colors: Green and Red
- March: Conquérir des volontaires, pour en faire des légionnaires (Conquering Volunteers to Form Legionnaires)
- Battle honours: Camerone 1863

Commanders
- Current commander: Lieutenant-colonel François-Xavier PETITEAU

Insignia
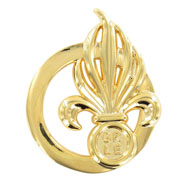
- Beret insignia of the Foreign Legion Recruiting Group
- Abbreviation: GRLE

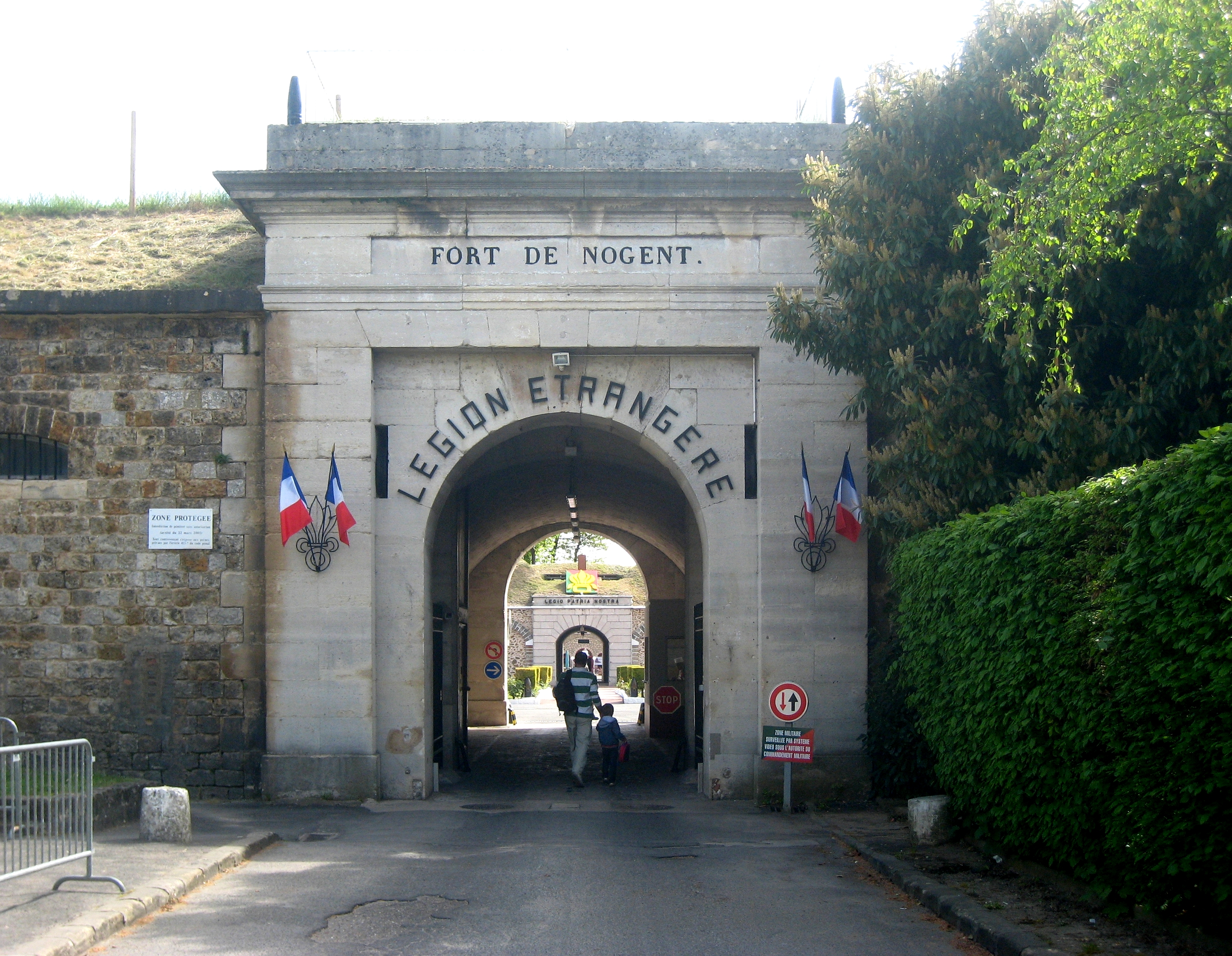
Recruitment center in Fort de Nogent.

The Foreign Legion Recruiting Group (French: Groupement de recrutement de la Légion étrangère, GRLE) is an administrative unit of the Foreign Legion responsible for recruiting volunteers from around the globe. The unit reports to the Foreign Legion Command (COMLE). The COMLE sets the annual recruitment objectives based on inputs from the French Army staff, l'Etat-Major de l'Armée de Terre (EMAT), and the initial projections of the Foreign Legion Human Resources Division (DRHLE).

The GRLE was created July 10, 2007 at Fort de Nogent, near Paris. The new unit assumed all recruiting responsibilities which had previously been assigned to the 1st Foreign Regiment's Recruitment Division.

== Mission ==
In order to supply the Foreign Legion with the required volunteers, the Recruiting Group promotes volunteer service by targeting the world public. This work informs potential candidates and leads to a pre-selection process followed by a contract of engagement at Aubagne.

While the mission of the Foreign Legion Recruiting Group is primarily focused on recruiting; the GRLE also carried out other functions, including training and supporting missions of the French Army both in France and abroad.

== Organization ==
The GRLE headquarters is located at Fort de Nogent, at Fontenay-sous-bois. The regimental commander supervises the Transit Company of the Foreign Legion (CTLE) and the Recruiting Company of the Foreign Legion (CRLE), with principal mission of:

- The support of the Foreign Legion in Île-de-France.
- The quest of engaging volunteers to serve in the Foreign Legion.

=== Transit Company of the Foreign Legion ===
The Transit Company of the Foreign Legion (CTLE), assumed part of the responsibility for the missions of the 1st Foreign Regiment CTLE dissolved on July 10 and is responsible for:

- Prospective candidate search.
- Recruitment of volunteers.
- Representation of the Foreign Legion on the territory with 10 information posts (PILE).
- The transit of Foreign Legion personnel and families between metropole and outre-mer (overseas) or Parisian regions.

=== Foreign Legion Information Posts ===
The mission of the Foreign Legion Information Posts (PILE) in Paris (3 posts), Lille, Nantes, Paris - Fort Neuf de Vincennes, Paris, Paris, Strasbourg, Bordeaux, Lyon, Marseille, Nice, Perpignan, Toulouse, consist of maintaining a quality recruitment that minimizes the circle of francophones while simultaneously maintaining diversity by the multiple presence of various origins.

The PILE, unlike the recruiting posts of the remainder of the French Army, uses civilian services and military resources to launch activities that would attract potential candidates through expositions, mobile information trucks and other mobile information posts. The Foreign Legion only recruits in France. The Foreign Legion will not obtain permanent visas for prospective recruits to travel to France, nor finance any voyage to France.

=== Recruiting Company of the Foreign Legion (CRLE) ===
The Recruiting Company of the Foreign Legion (CRLE), is responsible for:

- The escort of hospitalized and isolated legionnaires in region of Île-de-France.
- The evaluation of potential candidates at engagement in the 2 centers of preselection at Fort de Nogent and Aubagne.
- The conditioning placing of potential candidates at engagement towards the center of selection and incorporation.

==== Center of Selection Incorporation ====
The Center of Selection Incorporation (CSI) is an integral part of the CRLE and is located at Quartier (garrison) Vienot at Aubagne. The Center Selection is responsible for:

- The coordination and direction of the selection candidate process.
- The management of potential candidates course towards medical screenings.
- The enlisting of candidates during the selection process.
- The return of candidates not selected to civilian life.

== Traditions ==
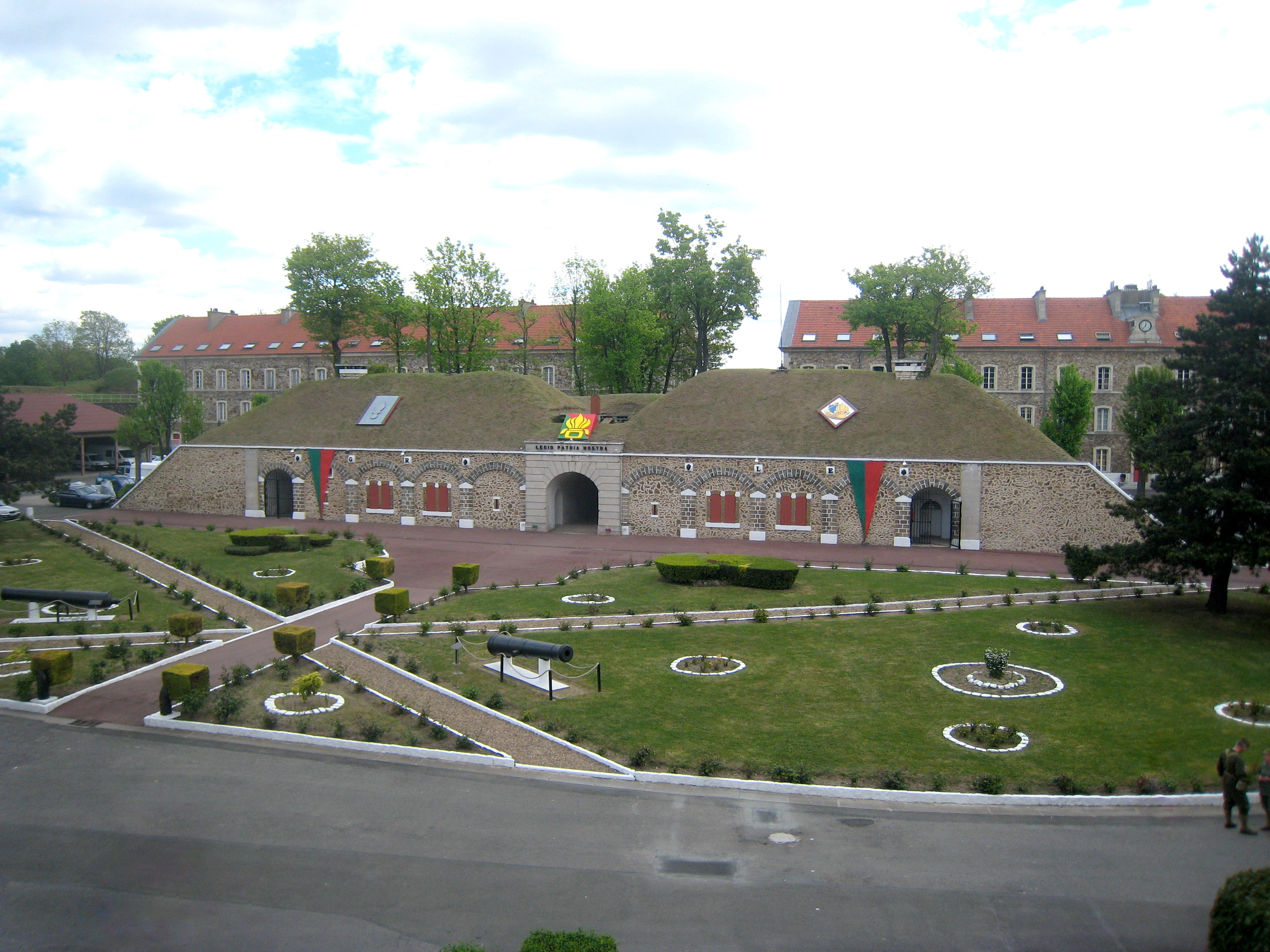
The Courtyard of Honor, Court d'Honneur.

=== Insignia ===
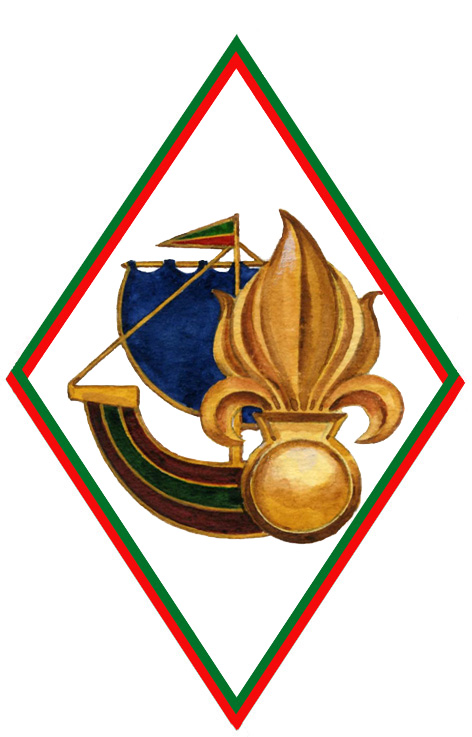
Regimental Insignia of the Foreign Legion Recruiting Group, G.R.L.E

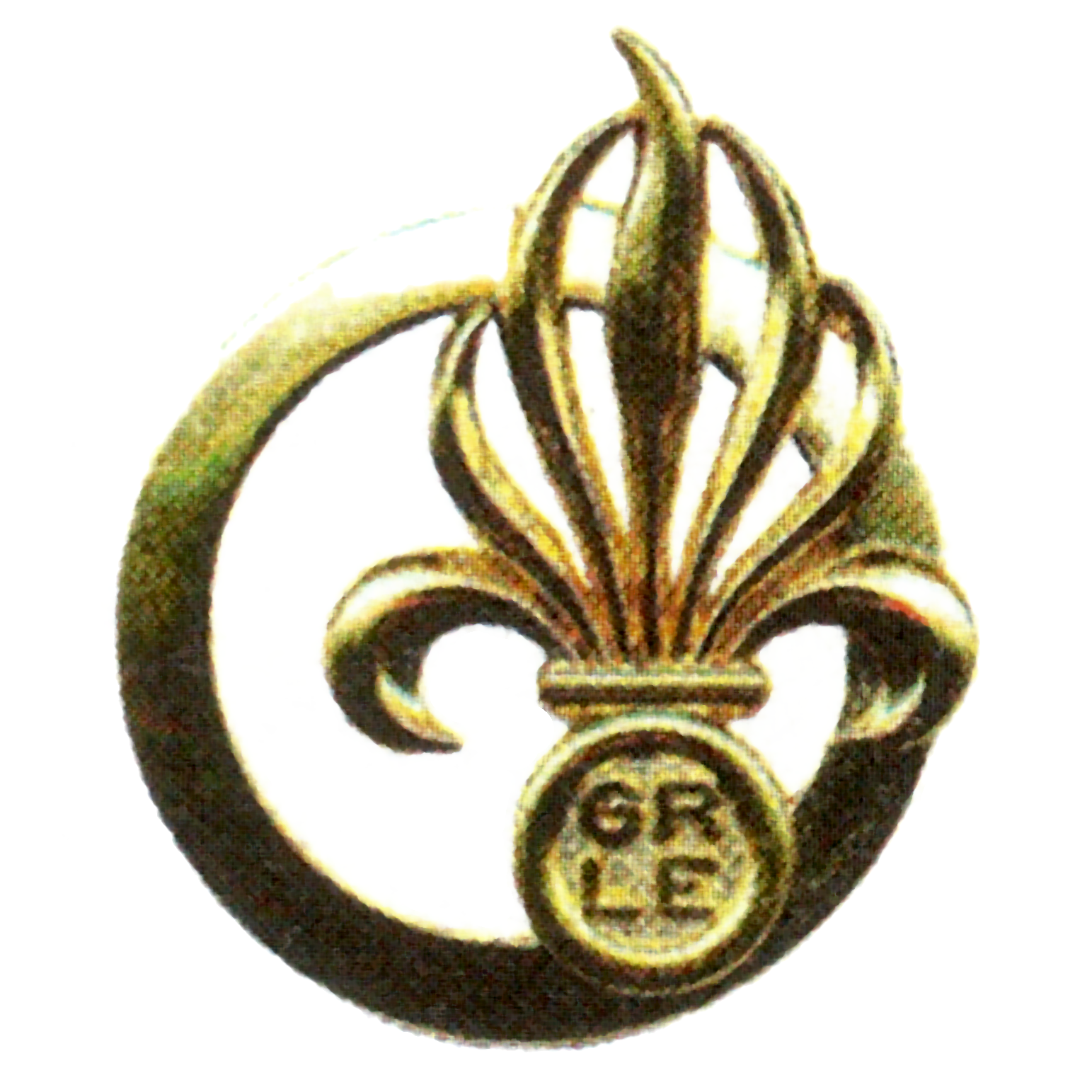
Beret insignia of the Foreign Legion Recruiting Group, G.R.L.E

=== Fanion Colors ===
At origin, Fanions served marking the assemblies of armies, a point of rally to and alignment manoeuver of military units. The notion of fanion-emblem surfaced in the campaigns of Africa and were generalized following World War I. The reglementation in concern for use were not established until 1976. Only the fanions of unit forming regimental corps, such as the Foreign Legion Recruiting Group (G.R.L.E) has right to honorary ceremonies.

For the G.R.L.E, the Division General of the Foreign Legion has authorized that the guard of the G.R.L.E Fanion be constituted of, as per reglementation, 1 Sous-officiers (fanion bearer), and 2 Legionnaires, all three armed with MAS- 49-56.

=== Regimental Song ===
Conquérir des volontaires (Conquering Volunteers to Form Legionnaires) is the Regimental song and mission of the Foreign Legion Recruiting Group:

Conquérir des volontaires, pour en faire des légionnaires
Du Groupement de Recrutement, c'est la mission
Conquérir des volontaires pour en faire des légionnaires
Nos Régiments frères attendent, notre moisson.

Du pays des corons
A celui des santons
Du pays bigouden
Aux méandres du Rhin
Par delà les frontières de l'hexagone
Les recruteurs vont et informent
Pour que flotte à tous les vents, les couleurs du fanion
Que résonne notre devise « Honneur et Fidélité », Gloire à la Légion.

De tous les continents
Viennent vivre autrement
La Légion tend la main
Espoir d'un lendemain
Du G.R.L.E., ils sont le vivier
Les volontaires du monde entier
Pour que flotte à tous les vents, les couleurs du fanion
Que résonne notre devise « Honneur et Fidélité », Gloire à la Légion.

Quitte ton ordinaire,
Pour une vie d'Légionnaire
Rejoints les plus vaillants
Les rangs des képis blancs
L'esprit de Camerone te guidera
L'exemple des anciens tu suivras
Pour que flotte à tous les vents, les couleurs du fanion
Que résonne notre devise « Honneur et Fidélité », Gloire à la Légion.

=== Honors ===
==== Battle Honors ====
- Camerone 1863

== Regimental Commander ==
- 2008 - 2010 : Lieutenant-coloneL Norbert Simonet
- 2010 - 2012 : Lieutenant-colonel Stéphane Bourban
- 2012 - 2014 : Lieutenant-colonel Thierry Morvan
- 2014 - 2016 : Lieutenant-colonel François-Xavier Petiteau
- 2016 - 20** : Lieutenant-colonel Yann Doutey

== See also ==
- Major (France)
- French Foreign Legion Music Band (MLE)
- List of French Foreign Legion units
