= René Morel (Légion étrangère) =

René Morel
- Born: 6 December 1908; France
- Died: 8 May 1974 (aged 65)
- Military career
- Allegiance: France
- Branch: French Army; Foreign Legion
- Service years: 1929 – 1968
- Rank: Général de division
- Commands: 13th Demi-Brigade of Foreign Legion; 13^{e} DBLE; Technical Inspection of the Foreign Legion
- Conflicts: World War II

René Morel (1908–1974) was a Général de division of the French Army and Commandant of the Foreign Legion.

== Military career ==
René was called for service at the 158th Infantry Regiment (French: 158^{e} Régiment d'Infanterie), on 15 October 1929. Admitted to follow the course of reserve officer candidates of the special military school (French: école speciale militaire), he was nominated as reserve Sous-lieutenant in October 1930. He was promoted to the rank of Lieutenant in 1932. He subscribed an engagement of one year at the 152nd Infantry Regiment (French: 152^{e} Régiment d'Infanterie) with the rank of Sergent (Sergeant).

Authorized to serve in situation activity, he resigned from his rank and integrated the Saint-Maixent Infantry and Combat Tank Military School (French: école militaire de l'infanterie et des chars de combat de Saint-Maixent). He was nominated as an active Sous-lieutenant, in October 1933. He was assigned to the 6th company, then the CAI, and at last to the 2nd company of the 35th Infantry Regiment (French: 35^{e} Régiment d'Infanterie) at Belfort.

In February 1939, he joined the mounted company of the 1st Foreign Infantry Regiment 1^{er} REI at Sidi bel-Abbes. Designated to be part of the 13th Light Mountain Demi-Brigade of the French Foreign Legion of the expeditionary corps of Norway, he combat engaged at Bjervick and at Narvik in quality as a section chief (French: section chief) of the machine gun company. He was cited.

In England, he decided to pursue combat and rallied to général Charles de Gaulle, where he joined the Free French Forces with his unit. He followed the tracks of the 14th Demi-Brigade of the Foreign Legion 14^{e} DBLE then the 13th Demi-Brigade of Foreign Legion 13^{e} DBLE at Dakar, Cameroun, then participated to the campaign of Eretria at the head of the 2nd company which he assumed the commandment. He distinguished himself during the course of opening violent combats. Wounded by a bullet during combats for the apprehension of Cheren, he refused to be evacuated as long as his unit was not relieved. He was evacuated to the French hospital of Cairo.

From January 1942 to May 1943, he combat engaged in Libya, Cyrenaica, Tripoli and at Bir Hakeim. On 27 May 1942 the strong hold point which he was commanding received the principal shock attack of 70 tanks. A part of these tanks penetrated his position and fired all the way in, reaching his command post. In response, the attack was halted by the artillery cannon firings of his company, with 32 tanks destroyed and very heavy losses inflicted on the enemy. On 10 June he was wounded by mortar fire, and wounded again on 11 June by bullets and mortar bombs. He refused to be attained to and healed. During the offensive of October 1942 which allowed Allied Forces to retake the initiative on the theatre of the Middle East (French: Moyen-Orient), he was wounded again by bullets during combats of Himeimat (French: combats de l'Himeimat).

Promoted to Chef de bataillon (Commandant - Major) in June 1943, he participated to the campaign of Tunisia and the campaign of Italy. He was wounded by shell blasts at Monte Leucio, on 23 May 1944. In August 1944, he disembarked at Cavalaire and went back on the valley of Rhone until Lyon and combat engaged at the Vosges.

Lieutenant-colonel in June 1946, he was assigned to the Military Cabinet of the War Minister (French: Ministère de la Guerre), then to the State Secretariat of the Armed Forces (French: secretariat d'Etat au forces armées).

In August 1949, he was the regimental commander of the 13th Demi-Brigade of Foreign Legion 13^{e} DBLE, and commanded the sector of Hoc Mon in Cochinchine.

Colonel on 1 January 1951 he was repatriated by end of colonial tour.

In September, he was nominated to the command of the general staff headquarters of Supreme Allied Armed Forces (French: L'état-major du commandement supreme des forces armées alliées) in Europe, the SHAPE. After having followed the 5th Session of the Defense NATO College, her served again in Supreme Headquarters Allied Powers Europe SHAPE.

In October 1953, he was designated as assistant (French: adjoint) to the general Commandant of the subdivision of Orléansville, then to the general Commandant zone-west Algéroise and the 9th Infantry Division (French: 9^{e} Division d'Infanterie).

Designated as Inspector of the Foreign Legion in January 1960, he was admitted to the 1st section of officer generals in the month of May of the same year. In that post, he avoided an attempt by the OAS. In December 1964, he received the commandment of the subdivision of the Alpes-Maritimes at Nice, then that of the 64th Military Division.

Général de division attained by the age limit of his rank, he left active service on 6 December 1968 and integrated the 2nd section of officer generals.

Général René Morel died on 8 May 1974.

== Recognitions and Honors ==

- Grand croix of the Légion d'honneur
- Croix de la Liberation
- Grand croix de l'ordre national du Mérite
- Military Cross
- Distinguished Service Order
- Norway Croix de Guerre (with sword)
- Belgium Croix de Guerre (1 palm)
- Médaille de la Résistance
- Numerous other commemorative medals.
- He totalized 12 citations, 10 out of which at the orders of the armed forces.

== See also ==
- Major (France)
- French Foreign Legion Music Band (MLE)
- Paul Gardy
- Pierre Jeanpierre
- Jacques Lefort
- Pierre Darmuzai
- Saharan Méharistes Companies (méharistes sahariennes)
