= Jean-Louis Franceschi =

- Born: 10 March 1947 (age 79); France
- Military career
- Allegiance: France
- Branch: French Army; Foreign Legion
- Rank: Général
- Commands: 1st Foreign Cavalry Regiment; 1^{er} REC Commandement de la Légion Étrangère

Jean-Louis Franceschi is a Général of the French Army and Commandant of the Foreign Legion.

== Military career ==
In September 1970, he was admitted to the promotion « Général Charles de Gaulle » at Saint-Cyr. Nominated to the rank of Sous-lieutenant on 1 October 1971, he chose to serve in the armored cavalry corps and pursued his formation at the Application School of Saumur in October 1972.

In September 1973, he was assigned to the 2nd Foreign Regiment 2^{e} RE at Corte and commenced his career as a section (platoon) chief of the foreign volunteers of the 2nd company. He was promoted to the rank of Lieutenant on 1 October.

In September 1975, he joined the 1st Foreign Cavalry Regiment 1^{er} REC at Orange where he assumed the functions of assistant officer for one year.

In June 1976, he occupied the post of a light machine gun platoon chief (AML), then assistant officer of the reconnaissance squadron of the 13th Demi-Brigade of the Foreign Legion 13^{e} DBLE, stationed at Oueah in the Republic of Djibouti. He was promoted to the rank of Captain on 1 October 1977.

Repatriated at end of tour deployment, he pursued the Captain's Perfection Course and joined again the 1st Foreign Cavalry Regiment 1^{er} REC in August 1978. After having been assigned as the director and works officer at the corps of the commandment and services squadron, he assumed the command of the 4th Squadron, from January 1980 to June 1982.

In August, he was assigned to the operational center of the general staff headquarters of the French Army (French: centre opérationnel de l'etat-major de l'Armée de Terre) where he served during two years in quality of a permanent officer. He was promoted to the rank of Chef d'escadron on 1 October 1983.

In August 1984, he was called upon as aide-de-camp of the Prime Minister.

In March 1986, he joined the Directorate of Superior Military Teachings of the French Army and the Superior War School where he taught History. In September 1986, he was integrated at the corps of 100th promotion of the ESG. He was promoted to the rank of Lieutenant-colonel on 1 October 1987. In June 1988, he was assigned to the 5th Cuirassiers Regiment (French: Régiment de Cuirassier) stationed at Kaiserslauntern in Germany where he assured functionality of the directorate of the instruction operation bureau then occupied the function of second in command.

Upon his return to France in August 1990, he joined the study bureau of the general staff headquarters of the French Army.

On 27 July 1993 he assumed the commandment of the 1st Foreign Cavalry Regiment 1^{er} REC. He was promoted to the rank of Colonel on 1 October 1933. At the head of this regimental corps, he participated for six months within the cadre of the United Nations, to action led in Sarajevo in ex-Yugoslavia. He commanded battalion infantry 2. He left his commandment on 30 July 1995 and pursued his services at the corps of the COMLE at Aubagne as a chief in the general staff headquarters (French: L'Etat-major) of the French Foreign Legion.

In August 1998, he was assigned to the Information Service and Public Relations of the French Army, where he exercised the functions of assistant, then chief of the designated service department.

He was nominated to the 1st section of officer generals on 1 August 2002 and he was entrusted with the command of the Legion. He was later admitted to the 2nd section of officer generals on 1 August 2004.

== Recognitions and Honors ==

- Chevalier of the Legion of Honor
- Officer of the Ordre national du Mérite
- Croix de la Valeur Militaire (cited at the orders of the division)
- Médaille commémorative française (agrafes « Ex-Yugoslavie »)
- Medaille de l'ONU (Medal of the Organization of the United Nations)

== See also ==
- Major (France)
- French Foreign Legion Music Band (MLE)
