= Paul Gardy =

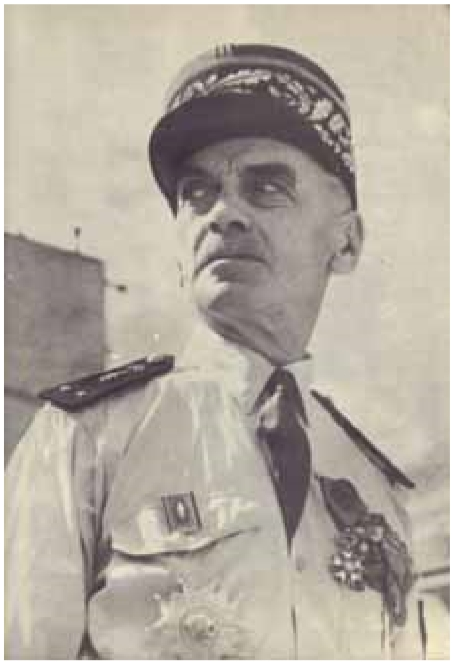
- Born: 18 August 1901; Paris, France
- Died: 26 October 1975 (aged 74); Oliveros, Santa Fe, Argentina
- Military career
- Allegiance: France
- Branch: French Army; Foreign Legion
- Service years: 1921–1961
- Rank: Général de brigade
- Commands: 2nd in command of the Autonomous Group of the Foreign Legion (1951); Autonomous Group of the Foreign Legion (1951); Technical Inspection of the Foreign Legion (1958)
- Conflicts: Syrian Revolt: Battle of Rashaya; World War II; Algerian War

Paul Gardy (18 August 1901 – 26 October 1975) was Général de brigade of the French Army and Commandant of the Foreign Legion in 1951 and 1958.

== Military career ==
Saint-Cyrien of the 108th promotion ("du Souvenir" - "of Memory" promotion), sous-lieutenant Gardy, graduated Saint-Cyr in 1923, passed a year of application at Saumur, then joined the 8th Hussards Regiment (French: 8^{e} Régiment de Hussards). Promoted to lieutenant, he was designated for the Levant in September 1925 and was assigned at his request, to the 4th squadron of the 1st Foreign Cavalry Regiment 1^{er} REC, with whom he took part to the columns of Hermon (French: colonnes de l'Hermon). Gardy distinguished himself notably during the defense of the citadel of Rashaya. Wounded twice, he was cited at the orders of the armed forces and evacuated.

Assigned temporarily at the 12th Cuirassiers Regiment (French: 12^{e} Régiment de Cuirassiers), Gardy returned in 1926 to the 1st squadron of the 1st Foreign Cavalry Regiment 1^{e} REC, in the region of Euphrate. With his unit, he was sent to Bou Denib in Morocco in 1927, then to Sousse in Tunisia in August 1928. In June 1929, lieutenant Gardy passed to the 3rd squadron with whom he redeployed to Morocco, Rich circle (French: cercle de Rich). He was later detached to the 37th Aviation Regiment (French: 37^{e} Régiment d' Aviation), at the squadron of Ouarzazate, with whom he operated in Central Atlas, Sagho and Draa. he obtained two citations and was made a chevalier of the Légion d'honneur.

In 1931, he was assigned to the 1st African Chasseur Regiment (French: 1^{er} Régiment de Chasseur D'Afrique), then to the 3rd Hussards. In 1932–1933, he pursued the course of an instructor lieutenant at Saumur, then joined the 1st Foreign Cavalry Regiment 1^{er} REC at Sousse in October 1933, where he assumed the command of the 1st squadron.

Gardy was promoted to captain in October 1934, and, after a short passage at the 2nd Mounted Dragoon Battalion (French: 2^{e} bataillon de Dragons Portés), he left the 1st Foreign Cavalry Regiment 1^{er} REC in 1938 to join the war school (French: école de guerre).

He took part in the campaign of 1939–1940 at the general staff headquarters of the 20th Infantry Division (French: etat-major de la 20^{e} DI), where he received a citation in June 1940. He joined quickly North Africa where he was assigned to the 4th Tunisian Saphis Regiment (French: 4^{e} Regiment de Saphis Tunisiens). Chef d'escadron in June 1941, he commanded the second squadron group of this regiment and took part to the campaign in Tunisia where he was cited at the orders of the armed forces.

Gardy was then designated as chief of the bureau of the 1^{re} DB as of July 1943. Designated second in command of the 2nd African Chasseur Regiment (French: 2^{e} Régiment de Chasseur d'Afrique) in April 1944, he participated with this regiment to the campaign of France where he distinguished capability in the offensive of Hautes Alsace. Wounded twice, he was cited at the orders of the armed forces and promoted to officier of the Légion d'honneur.

Promoted to lieutenant-colonel in January 1945, he was designated as an instructor at the general staff headquarter school (French: école d'état major), then attached to the military cabinet of general Kœnig at Baden-Baden.

As of March 1946, he commanded the 1st Cuirassiers Regiment at Neustadt. Gardy reached the rank of colonel on 1 October 1947, in June 1948 he assumed the functions of chief of the general staff headquarters of the 1^{re} DB, which he conserved until February 1951.

He was designated accordingly as commandant of the subdivision of Tours. He received the commandeur degree of the Légion d'honneur.

Designated as second commandant in command of the Autonomous Group Tenure of the Foreign Legion (French: Groupement Autonome de la Legion Etrangere, GALE) at Sidi-Bel-Abbes on 15 September 1951, he assumed tenure commandment on 1 October 1951, succeeding général Jean Olié.

In 1955, Gardy joined Germany as deputy to the général commandant of the 1^{re} DB.

Promoted to Général de brigade in 1957, he was designated as Inspector of the Foreign Legion on 31 July 1958.

Gardy participated the preparation and realization of the 1961 generals' putsch and joined général Raoul Salan at the corps of the Organisation armée sécrete (OAS) and took charge of the region of Alger then Oran where he remained until the end of June 1962.

Général Paul Gardy was condemned in absentia on 11 July 1961. He fled to Spain, then Argentina. Grand Officier of the Legion of Honour, Général Paul Gardy died in a car accident in Oliveros, Santa Fe in 1975. His car swerved and then collided with a train.

== Recognitions and honors ==

- Grand Officier of the Légion d'Honneur
- Commandeur of the Légion d'Honneur
- Officier of the Légion d'Honneur
- Chevalier of the Légion d'Honneur

== See also ==
- French Foreign Legion Music Band (MLE)
- René Lennuyeux
- Pierre Jeanpierre
- Jacques Lefort
- Pierre Darmuzai
- Saharan Méharistes Companies (méharistes sahariennes)
- 1st Foreign Parachute Regiment
- Hélie de Saint Marc
- Roger Faulques
- Christian Piquemal
