= General Maurin =

General Maurin may refer to:

- Antoine Maurin (1771–1830), French cavalry general of division
- Jean Maurin (born 1959), French Army general of division
- Louis Maurin (1869–1956), French Army general
