= Jean Maurin =

Jean Maurin
- Born: 1959 (age 66–67); France
- Military career
- Allegiance: France
- Branch: French Army
- Service years: 1979 – 2018
- Rank: Général de division
- Commands: 13th Demi-Brigade of Foreign Legion; 13^{e} DBLE; 11th Parachute Brigade; 11^{e} BP; Military attaché French mission to Moscow (2009 – 2012); International Relations; L’État Major des Armées EMA Commandement de la Légion Étrangère
- Conflicts: Chadian-Libyan War; Operation Manta; Operation Épervier

Jean Maurin (born 1959) is a Général de division of the French Army and former Commandant of the Foreign Legion.

== Military career ==
Saint-Cyrien of the promotion « Général Lasalle » (1979-1981). He was assigned as section (platoon) chief (French: chef de section) of the foreign volunteers (French: engagés volontaires) at the 4th Foreign Regiment 4^{e} RE in 1982, he then joined the 2nd Foreign Parachute Regiment 2^{e} REP in 1983 in quality of a section chief, then deputy officer (French: adjoint), and unit Commandant (Major).

In 1991, he became the chief editing officer (French: officier rédacteur) at the employment bureau of the general staff headquarters (French: bureau emploi de l’État-major) of the Rapid Action Force (French: Force d’action rapide). A selected trainee candidate at the Superior Course of the general staff headquarters (French: Cours supérieur d’état-major) (107th Promotion) from 1993 to 1994, he integrated the Defense Inter-arm College (French: Collège Interarmées de Défense) (2nd Promotion) from 1994 to 1995 and returned to the 2nd Foreign Parachute Regiment 2^{e} REP as a chief instructor of the operations bureau (1995-1997).

Chief editing officer, then chef de section of the planning bureau of human resources at the general staff headquarters of the French Army (French: bureau planification des ressources humaines de l’État-major de l’Armée de Terre) from 1997 to 2000, he commanded the 13th Demi-Brigade of Foreign Legion 13^{e} DBLE until 2002. Following this regimental command, he assumed the function of chief at the general staff headquarters of the 11th Parachute Brigade 11^{e} BP (French: Chef d’état-major de la 11^{e} Brigade Parachutiste).

In 2004, Général de division Maurin was the auditor (French: auditeur) at the academy of the general staff headquarters of the Russian Federation (French: L’ Académie d’État-major général de la Fédération de Russie) at Moscow (French: Moscou). From 2005 to 2006, he was the service chief « Session Nationale » at the Institute of Superior Studies of National Defense (French: Institut des hautes études de la Défense Nationale). He then, occupied the post of section chief of « Bilatéral Nord », division « International Organizations » (French: Division « Organisations Internationales »), at the general staff headquarters of the Armies (French: l’État Major des Armées).

From 2009 to 2012, he was the attaché (French: attaché de defense) of the French Embassy to Moscow (French: Moscou). Prior to assuming the command of the Foreign Legion, Général de division Maurin was the assistant (French: adjoint) and deputy (French: sous-chef) of international relations of the general staff headquarters of the Armies (French: « Relations Internationales» de l’État-major des Armées).

He participated to Operation Manta (1983-1984), as well as Operation Epervier in Tchad (1988-1989, 1996), He was in the Central African Republic, French element of operational assistance (1985-1986), Operations Almandin II and III (1997). In 1991, he participated to Operation Noroît in Rwanda. He was present in ex-Yugoslavia (Rapid action force under mandate of the United Nations) at Sarajevo in 1995, then he took part to Operation Salamandre (1996) for the mise en place of the Dayton accords.

He then returned to Africa in 1997 in the Republic of Congo (Brazzaville) for Operation Pelican and in 2003, he was the chief of the general staff headquarters of the Unicorn Force (French: force Licorne) in the Ivory Coast from October 2002 to February 2003.

In 2016, the 185th Anniversary of the Foreign Legion (French: La Légion Étrangère) and the 85th Anniversary of the Commandement de la Légion Étrangère (French: Commandement de la Légion Étrangère) was celebrated during the tenure of général Jean Maurin.

== Recognitions and Honors ==
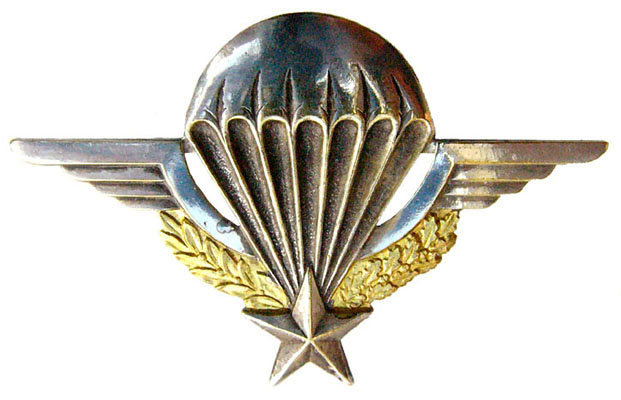

== See also ==
- Major (France)
- French Foreign Legion Music Band (MLE)
