= Louis Pichot de Champfleury =

Louis Pichot de Champfleury

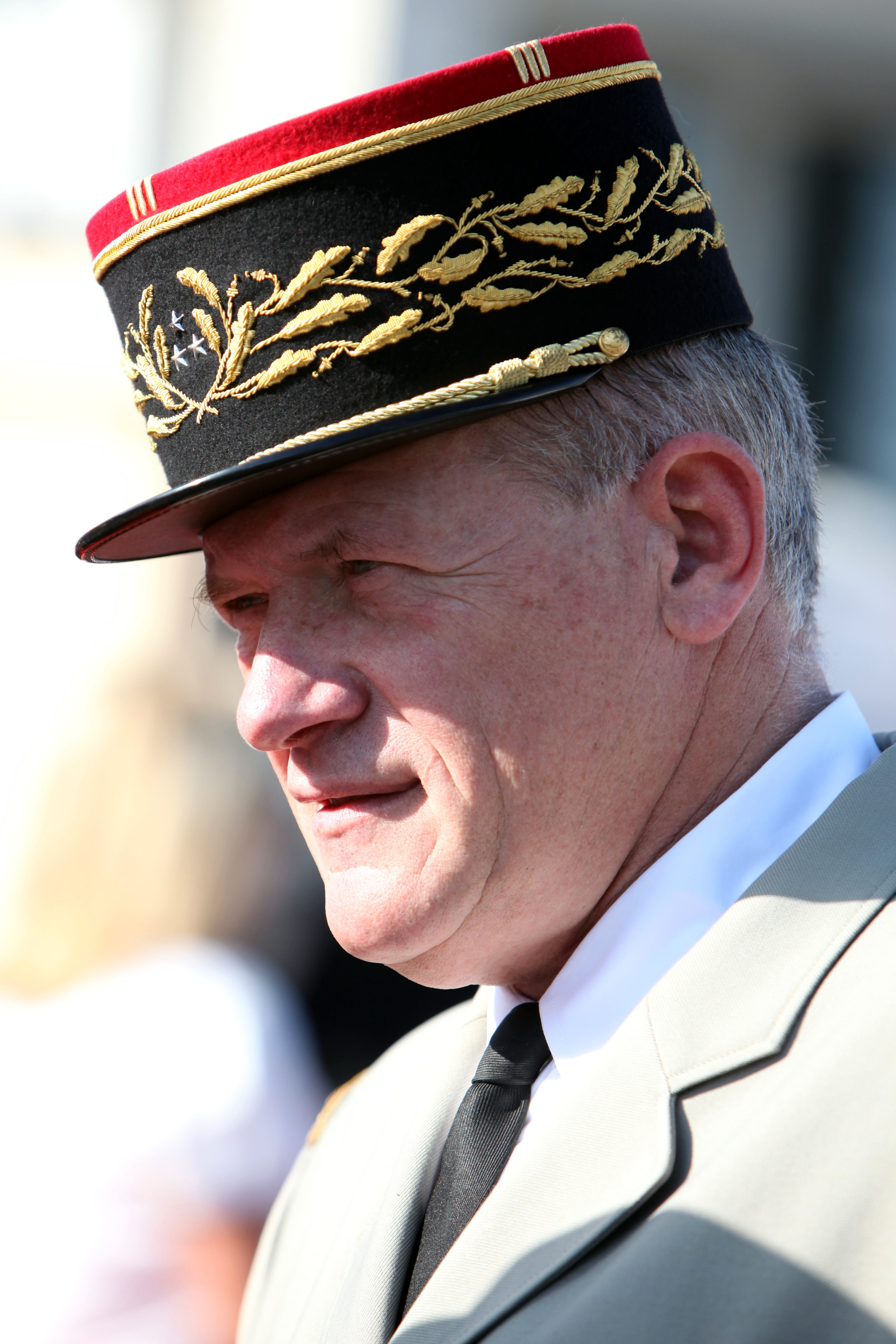
- Born: 20 December 1954 (age 71); France
- Military career
- Allegiance: France
- Branch: French Army
- Service years: 1974 – present
- Rank: Général de division
- Commands: 4th Foreign Regiment; 4^{e} RE Commandement de la Légion Étrangère

Louis Pichot de Champfleury is a Général de division of the French Army and commandant of the Foreign Legion.

== Military career ==
Louis was admitted to Saint-Cyr in September 1974, promotion « Lieutenant Élisée Alban Darthenay » (French: Élisée Alban Darthenay). Sous-lieutenant on 8 August 1976, he chose at his sortie to serve in the metropolis infantry option ALAT and joined in September 1976, the school of infantry application.

Lieutenant on 1 August 1977, he was assigned the 2nd Foreign Regiment 2^{e} RE at Bonifacio as a combat section chief (French: chef de section) and participated to a turning company at Mayotte and to Operation Tacaud in Tchad.

In September 1979, he joined the 2ème REP in quality of a combat section chief, then ordinary officer the following year.

In June 1981, he was assigned to the 5^{e} RMP, in quality as a detachment chief regimental security officer. He was promoted to captain on 1 August 1981.

Following his end of tour, he joined in August 1982 the 4th Foreign Regiment 4^{e} RE. Platoon chief of the 1st degree of the preparatory technical certificate, he passed to assistant (French: adjoint), then assumed the commandment of this unit in July 1984 after having undergone the infantry captain course from August to December 1983.

In August 1986, he assumed simultaneously the functions of assistant chief of the instruction bureau and high conduit officer at the second operational center of the general staff headquarters merged from the EAI/14th Light Armored Division. He joined the functional bureau during the last year as a quality operation officer. He was then nominated as Chef de batailllon on 1 July 1987.

He was admitted as a quality candidate to the 103rd promotion at the superior war school in Paris in September 1989. Designated to follow this course in Great Britain, he was issued a diploma from the Camberley Staff College in 1990.

In June 1991, he occupied the functions of bureau chief of SIRPA at Paris.

Lieutenant-colonel on 1 July 1991.

In July 1993, he joined Canada to assume the post of course director of the command and general staff headquarters college of the Canadian Armed Forces in Toronto. Upon his return, in September 1995, he was assigned to the general staff headquarters of the French Army EMAT at Paris. He was in charge of responses to parliamentary inquiries and follow-ups of the accounting audit courts as an officer editor at the planning finance bureau.

On 2 August 1997 he was designated as the regimental commander of the 4er RE. Colonel on 1 October 1999. During two years, he ensured, the increase composition of the future 2ème REG by creating two combat companies while leading the creation of a new instruction center destined to the formation of legionnaires at the corps of the regiment's formation.

In August 1999, he was assigned at Aubagne in quality as a chief in the general staff headquarters of the Foreign Legion (French: Etat-major du Commandement de la Légion Étrangère, COMLE), a post which he left in July 2001 to join his new posting in Paris, in order to assume the task functions of the assistant chief bureau of AC-RS of the DPMAT.

Général de brigade on 16 July 2006, he assumed the command of the Legion on the same date.

Military governor of Marseille and officer general of the southern defense zone as of 2 July 2009.

He was admitted to the 2nd section of officers generals on 31 August 2011, and promoted to Général de division on the same date.

== Recognitions and Honors ==

- Officier of the Légion d'honneur
- Chevalier of the Légion d'honneur
- Chevalier de l'ordre national du Mérite
- Croix de la Valeur militaire (cited at the orders of the brigade)
- Croix du combatant
- Medaille d'Outre-Mer (agrafe « Tchad »)
- Médaille de la Défense nationale

== See also ==
- Major (France)
- Music of the Foreign Legion (MLE)
