= Bernard Grail =

- Born: 29 August 1946 (age 80); France
- Military career
- Allegiance: France
- Branch: French Army
- Rank: Général
- Commands: 11th Parachute Division; 11^{e} DP; 4th Foreign Regiment; 4^{e} RE; 6th Light Armoured Division; 6^{e} DLB Commandement de la Légion Étrangère

Bernard Grail is a Général of the French Army and a former Commandant of the Foreign Legion (COMLE).

== Military career ==
Bernard Grail was admitted to the École spéciale militaire de Saint-Cyr in September 1967, and was part of class “Lieutenant-colonel de Sairigné”, he was nominated to the rank of second lieutenant (sous-lieutenant) in October 1968.

Following, he chose the mechanized infantry and rejoined in September 1969, the application school of the armored cavalry arm of Saumur, then in February 1970, the Infantry application school.

In August, he was assigned to the 35th Mechanized Infantry Regiment (French: 35^{e} Régiment d'Infanterie Mecanisé) as a platoon leader (French: chef de section). He was accordingly promoted to the rank of lieutenant on 1 October.

He joined for the first time the ranks of the Foreign Legion in August 1973 to command a platoon of the 2ème REP at Calvi. He then occupied the position of company executive officer (XO), then was promoted to the rank of captain on 1 January 1976. During his tenure as commanding officer of the 4th company, he participated in May 1978, in operation “Bonite” (combat jump at Kolwezi during which he was cited and was awarded the Croix de la Valeur militaire.

In August 1980, he joined the general staff headquarters (French: état-major) of the 11th Parachute Division 11^{e} DP as an aide de camp of the general commanding of the division. He then took the position of Head of the Overseas (French: Outre-mer section.

He was promoted to the rank of chef de bataillon on 1 October 1981.

In July 1982, he was assigned to the infantry application school as chief of the student group officers then assistant to the commandant in charge of the instruction of officers application groupement. In September 1984, he was a candidate at the 98th calls of the superior war college.

He was promoted to the rank of lieutenant-colonel on 1 October 1985.

In June 1986, he was designated to the Legion in quality of assistant applied-instruction at the general staff headquarters of the Foreign Legion at Aubagne.

In July 1989, he was promoted to colonel and assumed the regimental command of the 4th Foreign Regiment 4^{e} RE.

On 1 September 1997 he was designated as assistant (French: adjoint) to the general commandant of the 6th Light Armoured Division 6^{e} DLB.

On 1 September 1999 he assumed command of the Foreign Legion, where he was promoted to Général de division on 1 August 2001.

He was designated general assistant major (French: général adjoint major) to the general commandant of the South-West region as of 1 July 2002.

== Recognitions and honors ==

- Commandeur of the Légion d'honneur
- Commandeur de l'ordre national du Mérite
- Croix de la Valeur militaire (cited at the orders of the division with attribution)
- Medaille d'Outre-Mer (agrafe « Zaire »)
- Croix de la bravoure militaire zaïroise (Cross of the military bravery of Zaire)

== See also ==
- Major (France)
- French Foreign Legion Music Band (MLE)
