= René Lennuyeux =

René Lennuyeux
- Born: 1904; France
- Died: 1990 (aged 85–86)
- Military career
- Allegiance: France
- Branch: French Army; Foreign Legion
- Service years: 1923–1964
- Rank: Général de division
- Commands: Commandement de la Légion Étrangère (1955); Technical Inspection of the Foreign Legion (1957); 14th Infantry Division (1960–1961)
- Conflicts: World War II; Indochina War; Algerian War

René Lennuyeux (1904–1990) was a Général de division of the French Army and Commandant of the French Foreign Legion from 1955 to 1958.

== Military career ==
Saint-Cyrien of the promotion « du chevalier Bayard » (1923–1925). At his sortie, he opted for the Cavalry.

Sous-lieutenant in 1925 and lieutenant in 1927, he joined the 1st Foreign Cavalry Regiment 1^{er} REC in Morocco (1929-1934) and was cited three times.

Captain in 1936 and Chef d'escadron in 1943, he participated to the disembarking in Provence in 1944 with his regiment as a Chef d'escadron. He took part in the campaigns of France and Germany and was cited twice.

Lieutenant-colonel in 1945, he was designated as the regimental commander of the 2nd Foreign Infantry Regiment 2^{e} REI in Morocco from 1946 to 1949.

Colonel in 1950, he conducted two campaign tours in Indochina 1949–1953.

Général Inspector of the Legion from 1955 to 1958, his command tenure was followed and preceded by général Paul Gardy respectively.

In 1958, he was the director of the civilian and military cabinet of général Raoul Salan in 1958. Commandant of the 7th Light Armored Division (French: 7^{e} Division Blindée Légère) in 1959, he was also the commandant of the 14th Infantry Division (French: 14^{e} Division d'Infanterie) of the northern zone of Algeria in January 1960.

Général de division in 1960, commandant by interim of the Army Corps of Constantine in May 1961, he was also the Inspector of the Armored Cavalry Arm (French: L'Arme Blindée Cavalerie) in August 1961. The following year, he was nominated as the deputy to the commandant general of the 1st Military Region from 1962 to 1964.

He was admitted to the second section of officers generals in 1964.

Général René Lennuyeux died in 1990.

== Recognitions and Honors ==

- Grand Officier de la Légion d'honneur
- Croix de guerre 1939-1945
- Croix de guerre des théâtres d'opérations extérieures

He totalized 10 citations.

== See also ==
- Major (France)
- French Foreign Legion Music Band (MLE)
- Jean Olié
