= Marcel Letestu =

- Born: 8 April 1918; Joué-lès-Tours, France
- Died: 29 August 2006 (aged 88) France
- Allegiance: France
- Branch: French Army; Foreign Legion
- Service years: 1936 – 1976
- Rank: Général de brigade
- Commands: 1st Foreign Regiment; 1^{er} RE; Operational Group of the Foreign Legion; GOLE; Foreign Legion Groupment; GLE (1972–1973)
- Conflicts: World War II; Indochina War; Algerian War

Marcel Letestu (8 April 1918 – 29 August 2006) was a Général de brigade of the French Army and Commandant of the Foreign Legion.

== Military career ==
Marcel enlisted in the French Army in 1936 and became a Sergent (Sergeant) in 1938. A Sous-Officiers in the Franc Corps of the 160th Infantry Regiment (French: 160^{e} Régiment d'Infanterie de Forteresse) in 1939 to 1940 at the front, he was made captive during the Phoney War. He managed to escape a stalag and joined the free zone.

He entered to the École militaire interarmes of Cherchell. He graduated as a Major of his promotion.

At the end of war, he was named as an instructor at the Perfection Officer School (French: école de perfectionnement des officiers) of Achern. In 1950, he was the champion of France for precision shooting and recordman for rapid shooting.

Promoted Captain in 1951, he joined the 5th Foreign Infantry Regiment 5^{e} REI where he was cited and wounded in 1952.

He then served in Algeria where he commanded a battalion of the 1st Foreign Regiment 1^{e} RE. He was then assigned to the École spéciale militaire de Saint-Cyr, where he commanded a company prior to assuming the role of an infantry instructor.

Promoted to Chef de bataillon (Commandant -Major) in 1958, he commanded a general staff headquarters Division of the 3rd Foreign Infantry Regiment 3^{e} REI in the Sud-Oranais. He then commanded the Foreign at Madagascar, prior to becoming the regimental commander of the 1st Foreign Regiment 1^{e} RE in 1970. During his tenure, the Operational Group of the Foreign Legion G.O.L.E was created, then in 1972, the Foreign Legion Groupment G.L.E at Aubagne and the 2nd Foreign Infantry Regiment 2^{e} REI, leading to the formation of the Commandement de la Légion Étrangère which he assumed the first command.

He left the command of the Legion in 1973 to command, in 1974, the 23rd Territorial Military Division. He left active duty service in 1976.

Since 22 October 1977, général Letestu is the Patron of the École militaire interarmes promotion « Lieutenant Chezeau » (E.M.I.A 1977-1978) of the 1st Parachute Hussard Regiment 1^{er} RHP.

== Recognitions and Honors ==

- Grand-croix de la Légion d'honneur
- Croix de guerre 1939-1945
- Croix de guerre des théâtres d'opérations extérieures
- Croix de la Valeur militaire
- Croix du combattant volontaire
- Croix du combattant
- Médaille des évadés
- 8 decorations

He was commended 13 times, 8 of which were in the Armed Forces order.

== See also ==
- Major (France)
- French Foreign Legion Music Band (MLE)
- Jacques Lefort
- Pierre Jeanpierre
- Pierre Darmuzai
- Saharan Méharistes Companies (méharistes sahariennes)
