= Christian Piquemal =

French military officer (1940–2026)

Christian Piquemal

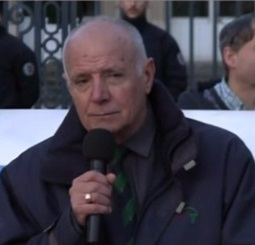
- Retired general Christian Piquemal during a manifestation against "Massive Immigration" at Versailles. Security in the background are in standstill.
- Born: 17 December 1940; Huos, Haute-Garonne, France
- Died: 23 October 2026 (aged 85)
- Military career
- Allegiance: France
- Branch: French Army; French Foreign Legion
- Service years: 1962–2000
- Rank: Général de corps d'armée
- Units: 1st Foreign Infantry Regiment; 1^{er} REI; 2nd Foreign Parachute Regiment; 2^{e} REP; 1st Parachute Choc Battalion; 1^{er} BPC; 9th Parachute Chasseur Regiment; 9^{e} RCP
- Commands: 3rd Foreign Infantry Regiment; 3^{e} REI Commandement de la Légion Étrangère
- Conflicts: Opération Épervier

Christian Piquemal (17 December 1940 – 23 October 2026) was an army corps general of the French Army and Commandant of the Legion from 1994 to 1999.

At 75, Piquemal was struck off the generals of the 2nd section for breaching the duty of reserve and loyalty after participating in a far-right political demonstration in 2016 around the Calais Jungle (the statute of soldiers in France provides that they are subject to a strict obligation of reserve).

In 2021, he was one of the signatories of a controversial letter from former generals and retired military personnel.

== Military career ==
Educated at the Lycée Hoche in Versailles, Piquemal joined the special interarm school (French: école speciale interarmes de Coëtquidan) in quality of a Saint-Cyrien as a cadet in October 1960 and after passing out was commissioned as a Sous-Lieutenant in April 1962.

In October the same year, he joined the Infantry School of Application at Saint-Maixent (French: école d'application de l'infanterie at Saint-Maixent), and the following year opted to serve in the French Foreign Legion.

His first operational unit was the 1st Foreign Infantry Regiment, 1^{e} REI, at Aubagne, which in August 1964 sent him to Mers El Kébir, then the home of the 2nd Foreign Parachute Regiment, 2^{e} REP. After that, he took part with his regiment in a posting to New Caledonia lasting eight months.

Promoted to Lieutenant, Piquemal served as a section (platoon) chief, then as sports training officer for legionnaires, and next as assistant (French: adjoint) to the Commandant of the 4th combat company of the 2nd Foreign Parachute Regiment, 2^{e} REP.

With the same rank, Piquemal next served under the command of Général Marcel Bigeard. In June 1967, he joined the new headquarters of the 2nd Foreign Parachute Regiment, at Calvi, which had previously been assigned to the 1st Parachute Choc Battalion (French: 1^{er} Bataillon Parachutiste de Choc) of the 11th Choc Parachute Half-Brigade.

Piquemal was promoted to the rank of Captain on 1 January 1970.

From 1973 to 1974, Piquemal finished his scholarity by following the cycle of higher military studies. In September 1974, he was assigned to the 9th Parachute Chasseur Regiment, 9^{e} RCP at Toulouse where he perpetuated his command time as a captain. With his unit, he conducted a deployment of 8 months to New Caledonia.

Already holding an engineering diploma from Supélec, in 1969 he began to study nuclear engineering at the University of Paris-Jussieu (French: Université de Paris-Jussieu) and at the School of Military Nuclear Energy Applications (French: École des Applications Militaires de l'Energie Atomique) and consequently earned a technical brevet for higher military studies from the Superior War College (French: École Supérieure de Guerre).

He was promoted to the rank of Chef de bataillon (Commandant-Major) on 1 December 1976.

Appointed deputy senior officer (French: Chef-adjoint) of the Technical and Radiology Studies Centre of the Directorate for Nuclear Tests, from 1978 to 1980 he was based at the Pacific Ocean Test Centre.

From 1980 to 1982, he occupied the functions of second in command of the 4th Foreign Regiment 4^{e} RE. He was promoted to the rank of Lieutenant-colonel, on 1 December 1980.

From 1982 to 1985, he was designated as the officer treating the study section of the inspection of the Infantry (French: section etudes de l'inspection de l'infanterie) where he was promoted to the rank of Colonel on 1 October 1984.

In August 1985, Piquemal was appointed commanding officer of the 3rd Foreign Infantry Regiment 3^{e} REI, a two-year posting until 1987. Then for three years he was a deputy to the Head of the Prime Minister's military cabinet (French: Chef du cabinet militaire du Premier ministre) during the tenure of three Socialist French Prime Ministers: The Government of Michel Rocard (1989–1991), the Government of Édith Cresson (1991–1992), then the Government of Pierre Bérégovoy (1992–1993).

In 1994, with the rank of Général de division, Piquemal took command of the French Foreign Legion, a fighting force of various religious faiths which includes also numerous Muslim Legionnaires, a combat leadership role which Foreign Legion general Piquemal held until 1999.

During his years in command of the French Foreign Legion, Piquemal created a cross-country team within the Legion which included several Legionnaires. As part of his team, Mohamed Ouaadi took first place in the Paris Marathon of 2000.

In 1999, Christian Piquemal was promoted to the rank of Général de corps d'armée.

In retirement, he was also the President of the National Union of Paratroopers (French: Union nationale des parachutistes, UNP) from 2004 to 2014.

=== Dismissal of army executives ===
In 2016, at 75, he was struck off the generals of the 2nd section for breaching the duty of reserve and loyalty after participating in a far-right demonstration around the Calais Jungle (the statute of soldiers in France provides that they are subject to a strict obligation of reserve, and soldiers are prohibited from engaging in partisan political activities).

== Recognitions and honors ==

- Officer of the Legion of Honor (1996)
- Chevalier of the Legion of Honor (1985)
- Commander of the Ordre national du Mérite (1999)
- Officer of the Ordre national du Mérite (1992)
- Youth, Sports and Associated Engagement Medal in gold
- Commander of the Order pro Merito Melitensi
- Officier de l'Ordre de l'Étoile de Moheli
- He was designated at the instar of the King of Spain as an Honorary Legionnaire of the Bandera.

== Controversies ==
=== Demonstration in Calais ===
Piquemal was brought into the international media spotlight when he was arrested for being present at an unauthorized manifestation which took place at the same time as another far right Pegida organized demonstration (which he claimed not to be associated with in any form) in Calais on 6 February 2016. His trial was scheduled to take place on 12 May 2016 at Boulogne-sur-Mer. Marion Maréchal-Le Pen supported him. During the same night Piquemal gave an interview in which he stated that he regretted that the far right movement Pegida was present on the scene at the same time as he and others were present there; however, he stated that he does not regret being present in Calais and represented only issues that were not related to any sort of religion nor the concept of immigration.

=== Tribune of former soldiers in 2021 ===
In 2021, Piquemal and over six thousand other military officers signed a letter warning of the disintegration of France. The government responded by announcing sanctions against all signatories in active service. The Chief of the Defence Staff, General François Lecointre, sent a letter to Piquemal "to tell him that he is unworthy, dirties the army, weakens it by making it a subject of national controversy". Piquemal's reply was deemed as odious and grotesque attack by journalist Jean-Dominique Merchet, who notes Piquemal's confusion over the role of the army and its place in the organization of political power, namely that the military do not have the right to interfere in politics, and underlines the far-right convictions of Piquemal.

== Death ==
Piquemal died on 23 October 2026, at the age of 85.

== See also ==
- Major (France)
- French Foreign Legion Music Band (MLE)
- Helie de Saint Marc
- Paul Gardy
