= Raymond Le Corre =

Raymond Le Corre
- Born: 31 October 1933; France
- Died: 23 January 2014 (aged 80)
- Military career
- Allegiance: France
- Branch: French Army; French Foreign Legion
- Service years: 1953 – 1992
- Rank: Général de division
- Commands: 1st Foreign Cavalry Regiment; 1^{er} REC; Assistant Général; GLE & 31st Brigade Commandement de la Légion Étrangère

Divisional general Raymond Le Corre (1933–2014) was a senior French Army officer. He was commander of the 1st Foreign Cavalry Regiment from 1977 to 1979 and of the Foreign Legion from 1988 to 1992.

== Recognitions and Honors ==

- Commandeur of the Légion d'Honneur
- Officer of the Ordre national du Mérite
- Croix de la Valeur militaire with 3 citations
