= Fort de Nogent =

French fort

- Part of Thiers fortifications of Paris
- Fontenay-sous-Bois, France
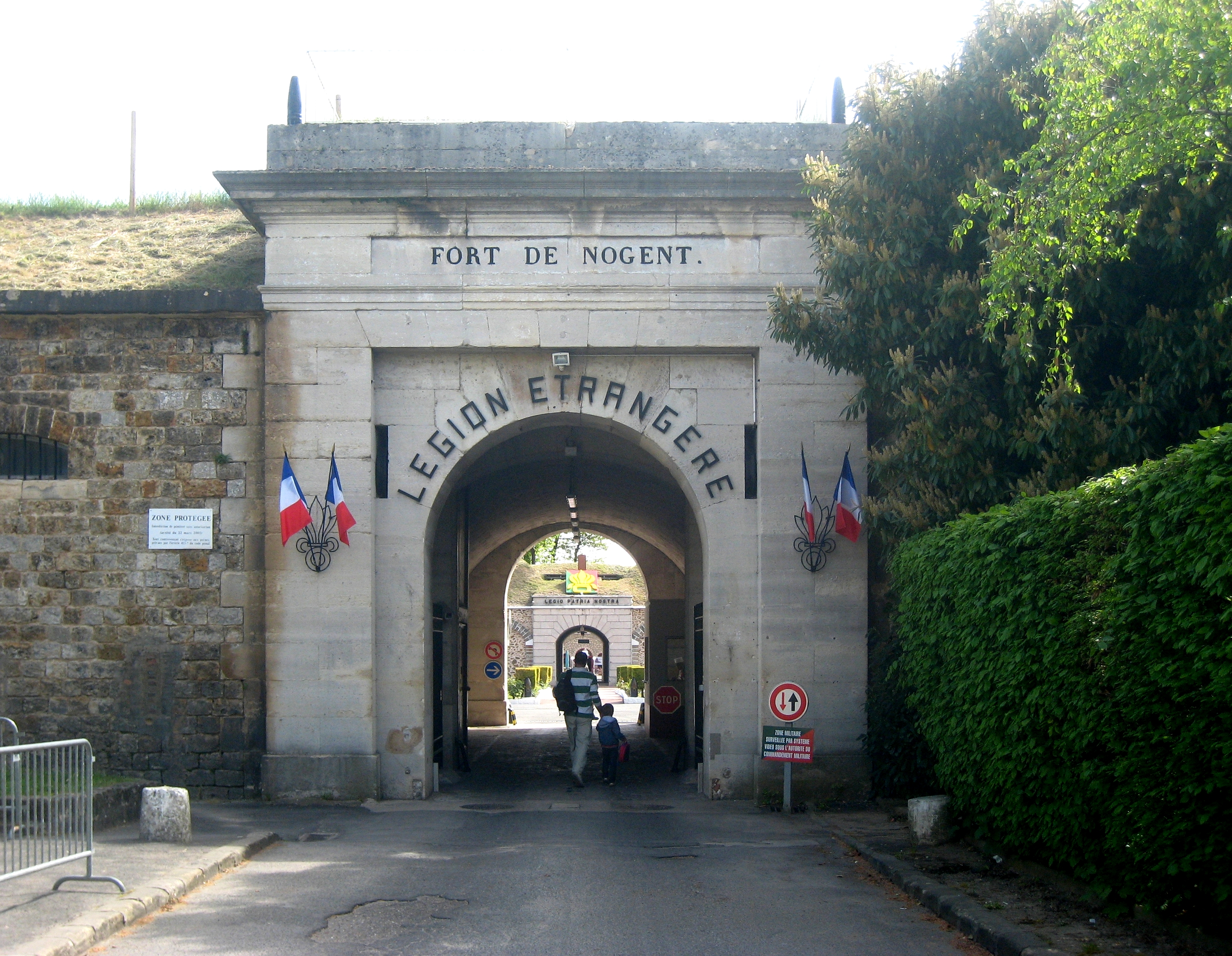

Site information
- Type: Fort
- Owner: Ministry of Defense; Légion étrangère
- Controlled by: France
- Open to the public: Special occasions
- Condition: Occupied by Ministry of Armed Forces (France)

Location
- Coordinates: 48.84479°N 2.4818°E

Site history
- Built: 1841
- Battles/wars: Siege of Paris (1870–1871)

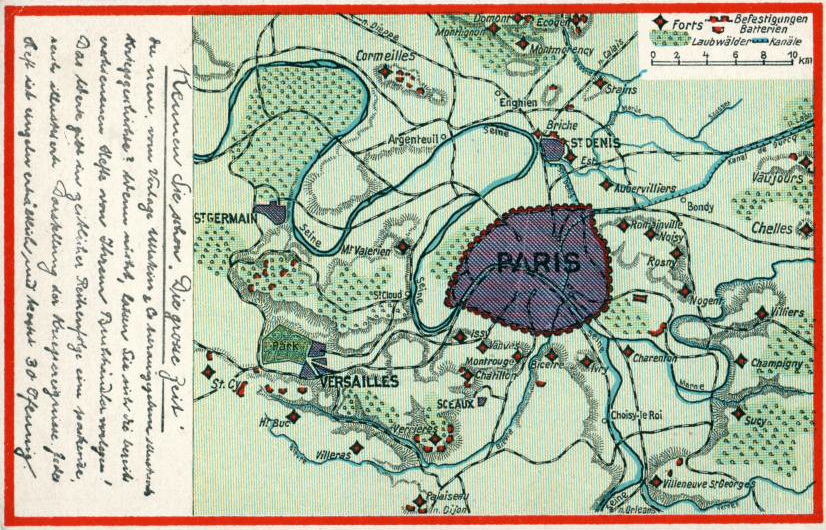
German post card showing the fortifications of Paris

The Fort de Nogent or Fort de Nogent-sur-Marne is a French fortification forming part of the fortifications of Paris. Despite its name, the fort is located in Fontenay-sous-Bois; the name is derived from Nogent-sur-Marne the town the fort was planned to protect. The fort is now occupied by the recruitment organization for the Foreign Legion of the French Army.

== Construction ==
The Fort de Nogent is one of seventeen forts built to protect Paris at the instigation in 1840 Adolphe Thiers, prime minister of the government of Louis-Philippe. Work began in 1841, with completion in 1848, under the direction of Guillaume Dode de la Brunerie.

The fort is surrounded by a pentagonal bastioned rampart 200 metres (660 ft) on a side, in the manner of Vauban.

== Siege of 1870 ==
During the Siege of Paris (1870–1871), the fort was commanded by Commandant Pistoulet, with artillery under the command of Chef d'Escadron David, engineers commanded by Chef de Bataillon Revin and medical services commanded by Doctor-Major Aude of the Navy. The infantry was composed of the 31st, 61st and 77th companies of line infantry (590 men and 8 officers, and the 11th battalion and two companies of the 13th battalion of mobile forces of the Seine, with 114 men and 30 officers. All of the mobile forces were sent north to Saint-Denis on 22 September. Artillery was composed of the 2nd battery bis of the 4th Regiment with 205 men and two officers, engineers with 40 men and two officers, 18 supply personnel, and three doctors and three attendants.

In December 1870, the Prussian guns bombarded the fort. The fort held out until it was given up to the Prussians at the French surrender on 26 January 1871.

== 1944 ==
On 23, 24 and 25 August 1944 there was violent combat between German troops and units of the French Resistance. Thirty Fontenaysiens were killed, and the Germans withdrew from the fort after shelling the train depot.

== Internment center ==
During the Algerian War the fort became an internment center. In 1961 nearly 200 officers, including those of the 1st REP (1st Foreign Parachute Regiment), who participated in the Algiers putsch were placed under "fortress arrest." Their detainment lasted for almost two months. The leadership of the Regiment was arrested and tried but the non-commissioned officers, corporals and Legionnaires were assigned to other Foreign Legion formations. They left the barracks singing the song "Non, je ne regrette rien", which has now become part of the Foreign Legion heritage and is sung when they are on parade.

== Present use ==
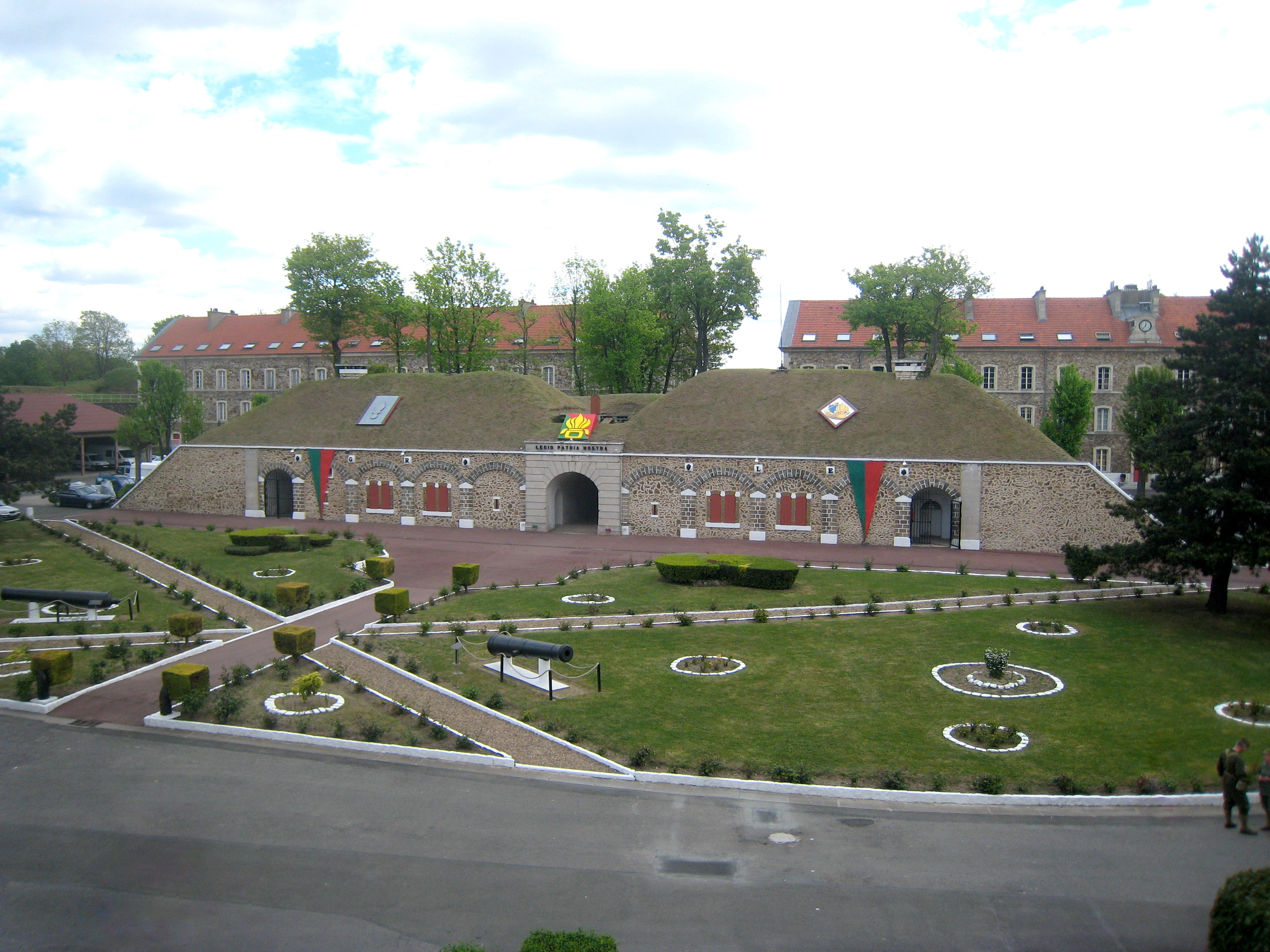
Cour d'honneur

In 1962 the French Foreign Legion placed a detachment at the fort. Today the fort houses a Foreign Legion recruitment center.

Since the winter of 2006–2007 the fort has accommodated a winter Salvation Army shelter.

== See also ==
- Fortifications of Paris in the 19th and 20th centuries
