= Gustave Fourreau =

French general

Gustave Fourreau
- Born: December 29, 1920; France
- Died: December 2, 1994 (aged 73)
- Military career
- Allegiance: France
- Branch: French Army
- Service years: 1942 – 1976
- Rank: Général de brigade
- Commands: 13th Demi-Brigade of the Foreign Legion; 13^{e} DBLE; Foreign Legion Groupment
- Conflicts: World War II; Indochina War

Gustave Fourreau (1920–1994) was a Général de brigade of the French Army and commandant of the Foreign Legion.

== Military career ==
Gustave engaged as a volunteer at the Special Military School of Saint-Cyr, 129th promotion « Croix de Provence » on October 14, 1942.

He escaped from France by Spain, on August 15, 1943.

Nominated to a Caporal-chef (Senior Corporal) on June 1, 1943.

He disembarked in Morocco, 87th company garrisoned in Rabat on December 15, 1943, where he was promoted to the rank of Sous-lieutenant at the officer school at Rabat.

He served as a section chief (French: Chef de section) in the 6th company of the 4th Moroccan Tirailleurs Regiment (French: 4^{e} Régiment de Tirailleurs Marocains, 4^{e} RTM) on September 23, 1944. With the same regiment and company, he partook to the campaign of Germany on March 3, 1945. Wounded on May 5, 1945, he was evacuated.

Promoted to the rank of lieutenant on June 25, 1945.

He then served with the 4th Moroccan Tirailleurs Regiment at Taza in Morocco as of January 24, 1946. In the same regiment, hen then served in the 7th company on May 1, 1946, and with the second support company February 11, 1947.

On December 20, 1947, he was assigned to the DCRE and the served in the 2nd battalion, 6th company of the 4^{e} DBLEM, on January 21, 1948. During the same year, he was reassigned to the DCRE on August 5, 1948.

Sent in reinforcement to the Far East (French: L'Extrême-Orient), he disembarked in at Saigon, and was assigned to the 3rd battalion of the 12th company of the 3rd Foreign Infantry Regiment 3^{e} REI, on September 21, 1948.

He was then nominated as the chief of the 9th company of the 3rd Foreign Infantry Regiment 3^{e} REI, on February 13, 1949.

He was repatriated on November 25, 1950, and promoted to captain, on April 1, 1951.

He was assigned to the DCLE-SMOLE, on April 2, 1951, as the Editor-in-Chief of Képi Blanc until 1953. He was the assigned to the Asian Sections Studies of the Center of High Studies of Muslim Administration (French: Sections d'etudes de l'Asie au Centre des Hautes Etudes d'Administration Musulmane) in Paris, on September 19, 1953.

Set in reinforcement again to the Far East on February 15, 1954, he disembarked at Saigon with the 2nd battalion of the 5th Foreign Infantry Regiment 5^{e} REI, on February 17, 1954, as a Captain Adjudant Major.

He then commanded the 2nd battalion, 8th company of the 5th Foreign Infantry Regiment 5^{e} REI, on May 1, 1955. He was repatriated with his unit to Oran April 6, 1956.

He served again with 2nd battalion, 8th company of the 5th Foreign Infantry Regiment on July 26, 1956, and was designated as the operations officer of the battalion on October 17 of the same year.

He was nominated as Aide-de-camp at the general staff headquarters of the Armies (French: État-Major des Armées) at Paris, on July 1, 1957.

He was then assigned to the ILE at Vincennes as chief of the contentious bureau on August 1, 1958.

He was promoted accordingly to a Chef de bataillon (Commandant - Major) on July 1, 1959.

He was assigned to the 13th Demi-Brigade of the Foreign Legion 13^{e} DBLE on four different occasional tours. The first assignment was at Bougie on July 22, 1960, on August 10, 1960, on November 3, 1960, then on November 17, 1961.

He was then nominated to the 1st Mounted Chasseur Groupment (French: 1^{er} Groupement de Chasseurs Portés) at Reims.

He was promoted to the rank of lieutenant-colonel, on October 1, 1964.

In October, he was nominated to the Command of the general staff headquarters of Supreme Allied Armed Forces (French: L'état-major du Commandement Supreme des Forces Armées Alliées) in Europe, the Supreme Headquarters Allied Powers Europe SHAPE.

Two years later, he was assigned to the Superior War School (French: Ecole Supérieur de Guerre), as an instructor on July 1, 1966.

He was nominated as the regimental commander of the 13th Demi-Brigade of the Foreign Legion 13^{e} DBLE, on July 3, 1968. Accordingly, he was promoted to colonel on July 1, 1969.

Repatriated for end of tour on July 15, 1970, he was nominated as the general staff headquarters of the 65th Military Division, on September 8, 1970.

He was nominated at the 1st Foreign Regiment 1^{er} RE in Aubagne, as colonel assistant (French: adjoint) to the commandant of the Foreign Legion Groupment GLE, on April 24, 1972.

Respectively, he assumed command of the GLE on September 1, 1973.

Nominated as a Général de brigade, he was admitted to the 1st section of officers generals on May 1, 1976, and was accordingly admitted to the 2nd section of officers generals on November 11, 1976.

Général Gustave Fourreau died on December 2, 1994.

== Recognitions and Honors ==

- Officier of the Légion d'honneur
- Chevalier of the Légion d'honneur
- Médaille des Évadés
- Médaille commémorative de la guerre 1939–1945
- Médaille commémorative de la campagne d'Indochine
- Médaille commémorative des opérations de sécurité et de maintien de l'ordre en Afrique du Nord

== See also ==
- Major (France)
- French Foreign Legion Music Band (MLE)
- Jacques Lefort
- Pierre Jeanpierre
- Pierre Darmuzai
- Saharan Méharistes Companies (méharistes sahariennes)
