= Bernard Colcomb =

- Born: 22 November 1937 (age 88); France
- Military career
- Allegiance: France
- Branch: French Army
- Rank: Général
- Commands: Foreign Legion Groupment; Deputy Chief GLE; 4th Foreign Regiment; 4^{e} RE Foreign Legion Command

Bernard Colcomb is a Général of the French Army and Commandant of the Foreign Legion.

== Military career ==
Bernard was admitted to the EMIA as a Saint-Cyrien in October 1958. In September 1960, with the rank of Sous-lieutenant, he joined the infantry application school.

In December of the same year, he embarked for Algeria to serve in the 6th Chasseur Alpine Battalion (French: 6^{e} Bataillon de Chasseurs Alpins). From October 1961 to February 1962, he completed the complementary reserve formations of sous-lieutenant officers of the promotion of Marshal Bugeaud at the infantry application school of Saint-Maixent.

In March 1962, he was sent back to Algeria. He was assigned to the 1^{er} RE, then to the 13^{e} DBLE. In April, he embarked with the regiment to Djibouti. He was promoted to the rank of Lieutenant on 15 September 1962. Assigned in May 1965 to the 2^{e} REI stationed in the Sahara, he was promoted to the rank of Captain, on 1 April 1967. He left the 2^{e} REI at the end of sites evacuations operations, end of 1967 and in February 1968, he was admitted to the 33rd promotion of the general staff headquarters school.

In July 1968, he was assigned to the Instruction Group of the Foreign Legion GILE of the 1st Foreign Regiment 1^{er} RE at Corte in Corsica. He conducted his commandment tenure of captain at the head of the instruction company for cadres and specialists. In April 1971, he joined the personnel bureau of the Foreign Legion at Aubagne.

In September 1972, he was admitted to the Technical and Scientific Superior Military School, and followed the brevet course of superior technical military studies with an option in informatics. He was promoted to the rank of Chef de bataillon (Commandant - Major) in July 1975. In September 1976, he was charged with the conduit of studies initiatives at the organization bureau, methods and atomization of the general staff headquarters of the French Army. He was then assigned to the 1st Foreign Regiment 1^{e} RE with the rank of Lieutenant-colonel, on 1 July 1977, where he exercised successively the functions of deputy chief (French: sous-chef) of the general staff headquarters of the Foreign Legion Groupment (GLE) from August 1979 to August 1981. After having held an officer tenure post treating the support and logistics of study conduit bureau of the general staff headquarters of the French Army, he was designated, in July 1983, to the commandment of the 4th Foreign Regiment 4^{e} RE. He was promoted to the rank of Colonel on 1 July 1984. Following his regimental command tenure, he was assigned to the superior war school at Paris where he was nominated assistant to the chief of studies conduit and coordination bureau, then professor. In 1986, he was assigned to the directorate of military personnel of the French Army as chief of the Infantry bureau, the chief of the general study conduit bureau. In September 1990, he assumed the functions of general staff headquarters of the 1st Military Region at Paris. He was then admitted to the 1st section of officers generals, on 1 November 1990.

He was destined to assume command of the Legion from 1992 to 1994.

He was promoted to Général de division on 1 June 1994.

== See also ==
- Saharan Méharistes Companies (méharistes sahariennes)
