= Jacques Lefort =

French army corps general (1913–1974)

Jacques Lefort
- Born: December 26, 1913; France
- Died: June 7, 1974 (age 61)
- Military career
- Allegiance: France
- Branch: French Army; Foreign Legion
- Service years: 1933–1973
- Rank: Général de corps d'armée
- Commands: 2nd Foreign Parachute Regiment; 2^{e} REP; Technical Inspection of the Foreign Legion; 1st Army Corps
- Conflicts: World War II; Indochina War; Algerian War

Jacques Lefort (December 26, 1913 – June 7, 1974) was a Général de corps d'armée of the French Army and Commandant of the Foreign Legion.

== Military career ==
Jacques subscribed to an engagement of 8 years at the title of the ESM of Saint-Cyr, on October 1, 1933. He was promoted to the rank of Sous-lieutenant on October 1, 1935, and rejoined the instruction company of cadres of the 1st Foreign Regiment 1^{er} RE at Sidi bel Abbes.

On June 21, 1936, he was assigned to Khenchela at the CMA. Volunteer to serve in Morocco, he was assigned to the 9th company of the III/3rd Foreign Infantry Regiment 3^{e} REI at Ain Afraksou on July 29, 1937.

He was promoted to the rank of lieutenant on October 1, 1937, and assumed the provisionary command of the company, from September 30 to November 1, before being nominated as number one platoon director at Ksar es Souk, on November 5, 1937.

He was assigned the Mountain Groupment Type of the Legion on February 29, 1940. He disembarked for Norway on April 22, 1940, with his unit, which became the 13^{e} DBLME on May 1. He distinguished himself at the disembarking of Bjervik, at the head of a motorcycle platoon and at Narvik where he was burned at front face while destroying a stock of enemy mines. He was cited at the order of the armed forces with the Croix de guerre 1939–1945. The unit embarked on June 8 to France. At this moment, he chose to remain loyal to the Government of Vichy and joined Morocco via England.

At the dissolution of the 13th Demi-Brigade of the Foreign Legion 13^{e} DBLE, he was assigned to the 9th company of the 3rd Foreign Infantry Regiment 3^{e} REI, on July 12, 1940.

In October 1940, placed in hors cadre position, he was designated as a quality instructor at the Moroccan Infantry School at Bar Deida.

He was placed on Armistice leave on September 4, 1941, however joined the 7th Moroccan Tirailleurs Regiment (French: 7^{e} Régiment de Tirailleurs Marocains) at Meknes, as of September 24.

On January 1, 1943, he joined the general staff headquarters of the GCSTM, where he was promoted to the rank of captain, as of March 25. He assumed the commandment of the 1st platoon of unit of tradition of the 1st Choc Battalion (French: 1^{er} Bataillon de Choc) at Staoueli, on October 30, 1943, then that of the 2nd company of the battalion stationed in Corsica, on December 25, 1943. He illustrated capability at the corps of his company during the disembarking of Elba, where he was wounded by bullet, on June 7, at the corps of the attack of the strong hold point of San Mamiliano; then in Provence and notably at Toulon, where he gained a citation at the orders of the regiment and a citation at the orders of the armed forces with Chevalier of the Legion of Honour. On October 24, 1944, he commanded the battalion. He was promoted to Chef de bataillon (Commandant - Major) on June 25, 1945. His battalion, integrated to the 1st Army Corps (French: 1^{er} Corps d'Armée), crossed France from Cavalaire in Alsace, while passing by Dijon, Haute-Saône, the Vosges and cumulated victories against the Germans: Chapelle de Ronchamp, September 30, de Fresse, October 3, de Servance and de Miellin, October 3, 4 and 5, Chateau de Lambert, from October 7 to 11. At the Haut-du-Tot, November 3, Belfort, d'Etueffont-Haut, on November 24, de Massevaux, the 29, de Bourbach-le-Haut on November 30, col de Hundsruck. During the course of his various operations and personal maneuvering, he lost fifty percent of his formation, while his adversary lost 600 personnel. Also during the course of his maneuver operations, he made way with almost 827 prisoners as well an extremely important material. The battalion was cited at the orders of the armed forces with attribution of the Croix de guerre 1939–1945. Personally, he gained two additional citations at the orders of the armed forces for his personal actions: at Toulon, Dijon and against the Bondensee division. He was wounded by a bomb blast in the right knee, at Melsheim, on January 30, 1945. He was promoted to the rank of Officier of the Legion of Honour, on July 15, 1945. This promotion was matched with an ultimate Croix de guerre 1939–1945, awarded for the advancement of his battalion in Germany and Austria and notably at Moulins d'Eyach, principal strong hold point of the enemy resistance in front of Hofen, Calmbach, Huntergrasse and col of l'Arlberg.

At the dissolution of the "1^{er} Choc", he commanded the 1/1^{e} RI of Aero Portable Choc Infantry, on October 1, 1945. With his unit, he disembarked in Algeria, on April 25, 1946. At the end of his command tour, he was assigned to the school center of Aero Portable Troops at Pau, on April 22, 1947. In December, he assumed command of the 218 Parachute Infantry Battalion.

Assigned in reinforcement in the Far East, he disembarked at Saigon on April 14, 1951, and joined the Commando Aero Portable Group (GCMA), then the commandment of the Inter-arm Military Schools of Dalat. He was placed in hors cadre position, on June 15, 1951. In this post, he was cited at the orders of the armed forces with Croix de guerre des théâtres d'opérations extérieures on March 24, 1953, for the police operations in the sector of Haut-Donhai, undertaken by the School, under his commandment. Repatriated, he disembarked in Marseille on July 10, 1953, took his end of tour leave and joined the school base of the TAP, on November 3. He was promoted to the rank of lieutenant-colonel on April 2, 1954. He assumed the function of CEM of the commandment of TAP at Paris on December 5, 1955. During this tenure, he participated to the coordination of supply elements by Air "Amilcar" at Cyprus from September 9 to December 1, 1956, in support of the Suez operation. He was cited at the orders of the Division with Croix de guerre des TOE. He participated as well to a mission of maintaining order in Mauritania, from December 1956 to March 22, 1957. He was promoted to Commandeur of the order of the Legion of Honour, on July 12, 1956. He then served at the general staff headquarters of the Minister of Defense (French: Etat-major particulier du Ministre de la Défense) as of November 1957. He was promoted to the rank of colonel, on March 31, 1958. Designated for his time as a superior commanding officer, he was nominated as regimental commander of the 2nd Foreign Parachute Regiment 2^{e} REP, on April 7, 1958. Heading his unit, he was awarded 3 citations at the orders of the armed forces with the Croix de la Valeur Militaire, compensating his personal actions in the Beni Sbihi (Northern Constantinois Zone), in the Djebel Mouadjene, near Souk Aharas (Zone Constantinois East), during activities in the region of Guelma. He was wounded on September 30, 1958, during a night ambush on the route of Heliopolis; in the region of Gambetta, in the region of Randon, in the region of Beni Mezzeline, then during various combats in the Constantinois: « Rubis », « Saphir », « Turquoise ». Casualties inflicted on the adversary were heavy: 400 rebels placed out of combat, 200 war arms out of which one 20 mm cannon, 1 mortar, 25 machineguns, 1 LRAC, 5 machine gun pistols, 3 automatic pistols, 1 radio post, as well seized munitions and equipment.

In front of leaving his commandment, he was assigned to the Military Cabinet of the Minister of the Armies (French: cabinet militaire du ministre des armées), on June 1, 1960, then integrated in October, the groupment of schools of superior military studies in quality as an auditor at HEDN and at the CHEMM. He was then designated to the commandment of the Saharan Zone East at Ouargla, which he rejoined on May 16, 1961. In this post, he gained his last citation at the orders of the armed forces with CVM for operations led in the region bordering Constantinois and the Tunisian and Libyan frontiers. On July 20, 1961, he pierced the Tunisian attack on the Fort Thiriet.

Nominated to the 1st section of officer generals, on July 1, 1962, he assumed the commandment of the 2nd Brigade, as of July 4.

Leaving Algeria at independence, he was assigned in quality as Inspector of the Foreign Legion, in August 1962. Then, he was designated for the French Military Mission of Instruction at Laos, which he joined at the end of September 1964.

He was elevated to the dignity of Grand Officier of the Legion of Honor, on July 14, 1965.

Repatriated on July 1, 1967, he was assigned to the 42nd Military Division. In April 1969, he was designated as assistant (French: adjoint) of the Commandant of the 4th Military Region.

He was promoted to Général de division in June 1969.

He assumed accordingly the commandment of the 11th Division, on October 1. This unit became the 11th Parachute Division 11^{e} DP, on April 1, 1971.

On February 26, he was elevated to the dignity of Grand Croix of Ordre National de Mérite.

In October, he was assigned to the Inspection General of the French Army. He then assumed command of the 1st Army Corps (French: 1^{e} Corps d'Armée), on February 13, 1972.

Elevated to the rank and designation of Général de corps d'armée, March 1, he was admitted to the 2nd Section of officer generals by age limit, on December 26, 1973.

Général de corps d'armée Jacques Lefort died on June 7, 1974.

== Recognitions and Honors ==

- Grand Officier of the Légion d'Honneur
  - Commandeur of the Légion d'Honneur
  - Officier of the Légion d'Honneur
  - Chevalier of the Légion d'Honneur
- Grand croix de l'ordre national du Mérite
- Croix de guerre 1939-1945 (8 citations and Fourragere)
- Croix de guerre des théâtres d'opérations extérieures
- Croix de la Valeur Militaire
- Chevalier of the Ordre du Mérite Agricole
- Médaille de l'Aéronautique
- Médaille d’honneur de la Jeunesse et des Sports
- Médaille Coloniale with agrafe « Extrême-Orient »
- Médaille commémorative de la campagne d'Indochine
- Médaille commémorative des opérations de sécurité et de maintien de l'ordre en Afrique du Nord (agrafes « Sahara », « Algérie »,« Tunisie » and « Mauritanie »)
- Médaille commémorative des operations de Suez (Commemorative medal of Suez operations)
- Officer of the Saharan Civil Merit Order
- Distinguished Service Cross (« U.S. »)
- Commandeur de l'ordre national du Vietnam (Commander of the National Order of Vietnam)
- Officier de l'ordre national du Vietnam (Officer of the National Order of Vietnam)
- Norway Croix de Guerre (with sword)
- Commandeur du Ouissam Alaouite (Commander of the Ouissam Alaouite)
- Médaille commemorative de Norvège (Commemorative Medal of Norway)
- Commandeur de l'ordre de l'Etoile noir D'Anjouan (Commander of the Back Star Order of Anjouan)
- Croix de Vaillance Vietnamienne (1 palme) (Cross of Vietnamese Vaillance/ Bravery)
- Mérite militaire de 1^{re} Classe (1st Class Mexican Medal of Military Merit)

La 212e promotion des élèves officiers de Saint Cyr porte son nom

== See also ==
- Major (France)
- French Foreign Legion Music Band (MLE)
- Pierre Jeanpierre
- Pierre Darmuzai
- Jacques Morin
- Saharan Méharistes Companies (méharistes sahariennes)
