= Général =

French senior officer rank

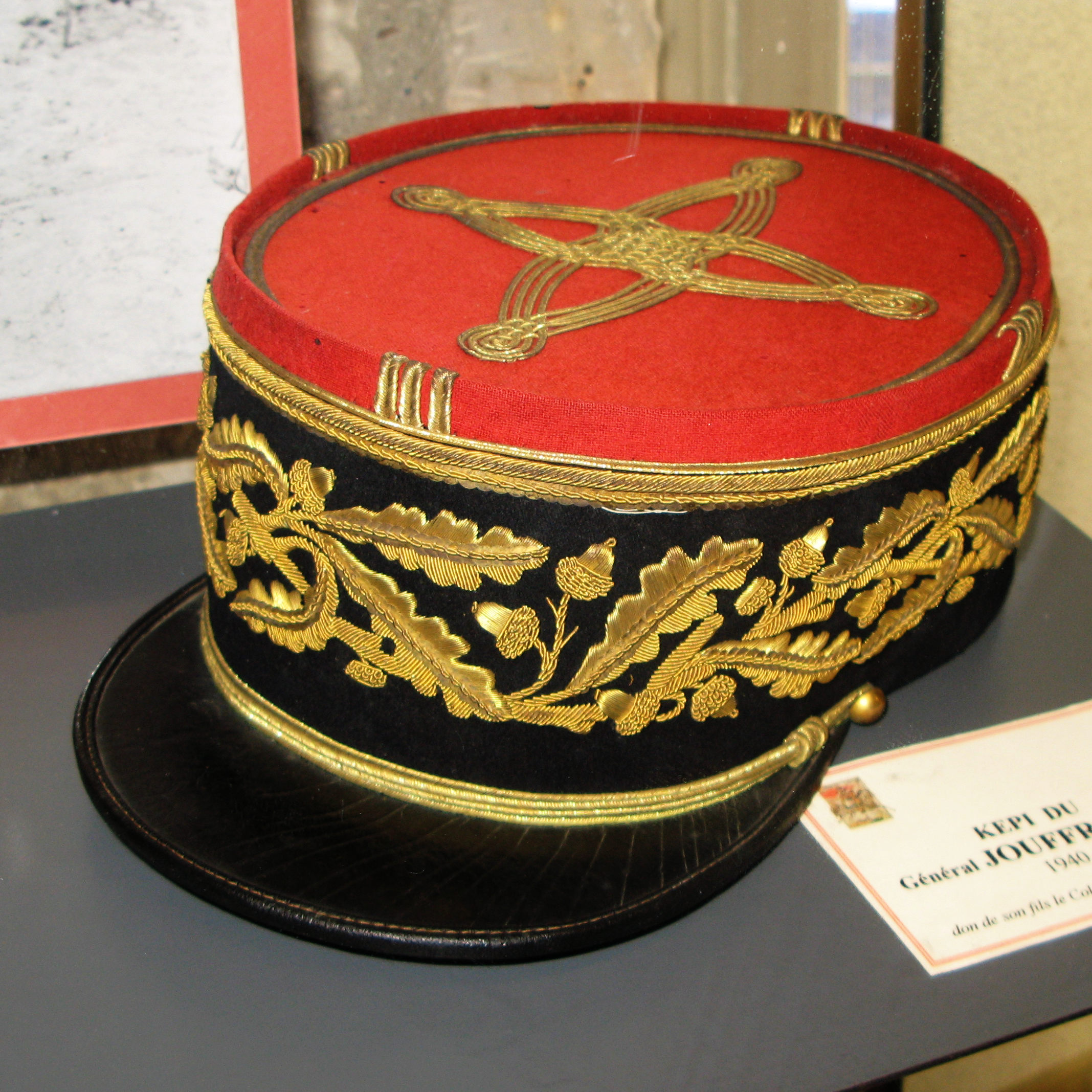
Képi of a général

Général is the French word for general. There are two main categories of generals: the general officers (officiers généraux), which are the highest-ranking commanding officers in the armed forces, and the specialist officers with flag rank (officiers des services avec rang d'officer général), which are high-level officers in the other uniformed services.

== General officers ==
=== Army ===
==== History ====
The French army of the monarchy had several ranks of general officer:

- Brigadier des armées du roi ("brigadier of the armies of the King"): a rank in a grey area of seniority, conferred on certain colonels who were in command of a brigade (cf. the grey area of the naval "commodore" rank given to certain captains, the equivalent of army full colonels, who had been in command of a group of ships and over the captains of the group's other ships). These officers wore a colonel's uniform with a star on the shoulder straps. This rank was abolished in 1788.
- Maréchal de camp ("field marshal"(major general)): the first substantive rank of general. The maréchaux de camp wore a special uniform, blue and red, with a single bar of gold lace, and in the late 18th century also received two stars on the shoulder straps. With the abolition of the rank of brigadier des armées in 1788, it became the lowest general officer rank, but its insignia of two stars remained unchanged. The rank was redesignated Général de brigade in 1793 which retained the two star insignia. This explains why French generals' insignia starts with two stars.
- Lieutenant général: the highest military rank. Lieutenants généraux wore the same uniform as the maréchaux de camp, but with two bars of gold lace, and in the late 18th century also received three stars on the shoulder straps.
- Général: an appointment conferred on a lieutenant général who was commander-in-chief of a campaign.
- Maréchal de France: not a military rank, but a dignity of the Crown.

During the French Revolution, the ranks of maréchal de camp and lieutenant general were renamed général de brigade and général de division, and the appointment of général was renamed général en chef. In 1793, the dignity of maréchal de France was abolished.

Napoléon Bonaparte reinstated the dignity of maréchal de France, now named maréchal d'empire. In 1814, the ranks of général de brigade and général de division reverted to maréchal de camp and lieutenant général, but were changed back again in 1848.

The Third Republic of the 1880s reorganised the ranks of général:

- Général de brigade, wearing two stars.
- Général de division, wearing three stars.

World War I

- General de division ayant un commandement spérieur (divisional general holding higher command), wearing three star and a holizontal bar above or below it. Considering the personnel balance with general officers of other countries during World War I. measures were taken to give commanders of an army corps and higher units the status and treatment corresponding to the Four-star rank.

Established in 1921

- Général commandant un corps d'armée (général commanding an army corps), an appointment conferred on certain généraux de division, wearing four stars. This appointment became the position and style (rang et appellation) of général de corps d'armée in 1936.
- Général membre du conseil supérieur de la guerre (general - member of the superior council of war, a body of the Ministry of War which had the functions of a general staff), wearing five stars. The experience of the First World War transformed the structure of the French Army. The superior council of war was abolished and an appointment of général commandant une armée (general commanding an army) was created. This appointment became the position and style (rang et appellation) of général d'armée in 1936. The dignity of maréchal de France was reinstated and given to the commanders-in-chief of the conflict, such as Joseph Joffre, Ferdinand Foch and Philippe Pétain.

==== Ranks as of 2013 ====
In France, army generals are named after the type of unit they command.

NATO rank	Rank insignia			Name		Description
NATO rank	Shoulder	Sleeve	Camouflage	French	English translation	Description
OF-9				Général d'armée	Army general	In command of an army.
OF-8				Général de corps d'armée	Army corps general	In command of an army corps. (Note: The Général de corps d'armée in the French Armed Forces, is the third ranking order of the general officer corps, based on the hierarchical order. The designation of a général de corps d'armée is situated above a général de division and underneath the designation of général d'armée. By regulation, the rank refers to an officer of the rank of « Général de division » who receives the « rank and designation » of a « Général de corps d'armée ». This rank would command an Army Corps, a unit composing several Divisions. The insignia is composed of 4 stars. A Presidential Decree on 19 November 1873 introduced for a first time the notion of "corps armée". A circular on 17 March 1921 depicted that generals commanding an Army Corps (French: corps d'armée) would wear a 4th star, forming with the first three, a diamond shape. The generals commanding the army and the members of the Superior War Council wore a 5th star, superposed in the first 4 stars. Finally a Law Decree of 6 June 1939 made official, the designations and ranks referrals of "Général d'armée", "Général de corps d'armée", "Amiral", "Vice-amiral d'escadre", "Général d'armée aérienne" et "Général de corps aérien".)
OF-7				Général de division	Divisional general	In command of a division.
OF-6				Général de brigade	Brigadier general	In command of a brigade, or of a région in the Gendarmerie.

=== Air force ===
NATO rank	Rank insignia		Name		Description
NATO rank	Shoulder	Sleeve	French	English translation	Description
OF-9			Général d'armée aérienne	Army air general	In command of an air force.
OF-8			Général de corps aérien	Air corps general	In command of an air force corps.
OF-7			Général de division aérienne	Divisional air general	In command of a division.
OF-6			Général de brigade aérienne	Air brigade general	In command of a brigade, or of a région in the Gendarmerie.

== Specialist officers ==
=== Armament ===
- Ingénieur général de l'armement de deuxième classe (transl. Engineer general of armaments, 2nd class)
- Ingénieur général de l'armement de première classe (transl. Engineer general of armaments, 1st class)
- Ingénieur général de l'armement hors classe (transl. Engineer general of armaments, special class)
- Ingénieur général de l'armement de classe exceptionnelle (transl. Engineer general of armaments, outstanding class)

=== Maritime Administration ===
- Administrateur général des affaires maritimes de deuxième classe (transl. Administrative general of maritime affairs, 2nd class)
- Administrateur général des affaires maritimes de première classe (transl. Administrative general of maritime affairs, 1st class)

=== Military Administration ===
- Commissaire général de deuxième classe (transl. Commissioner general 2nd class)
- Commissaire général de première classe (transl. Commissioner general 1st class)
- Commissaire général hors classe (transl. Commissioner general special class)

=== Military engineering ===
- Ingénieur général militaire d'infrastructure de deuxième classe (transl. Engineer general of infrastructure, 2nd class)
- Ingénieur général militaire d'infrastructure de première classe (transl. Engineer general of infrastructure, 1st class)
- Ingénieur général militaire d'infrastructure hors classe (transl. Engineer general of infrastructure, special class)
