= 6th Foreign Engineer Regiment =

6th Foreign Engineer Regiment (6e Régiment étranger de Génie)
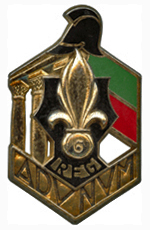
- Regimental Insignia of 6^{e} REG
- Active: 6th Foreign Engineer Regiment 1984 - 1999 1st Foreign Engineer Regiment 1999-present
- Country: France
- Branch: (France) French Army
- Type: Engineer
- Role: Combat Engineer; Airborne Combat Engineer
- Size: 750
- Part of: 6th Light Armoured Division, (6^{e} DLB)
- Garrison/HQ: Laudun
- Patron: Saint Barbara
- Motto: AD UNUM ( All to One End )
- Colors: Green & Red
- March: Sapeurs, mineurs et bâtisseurs
- Engagements: Kuwait 1990–1991
- Battle honours: Camerone 1863; Battle of Messifre 1925; Syria 1925-1926; Kuwait 1990–1991

Insignia
- Identification symbol: 6^{e} REG

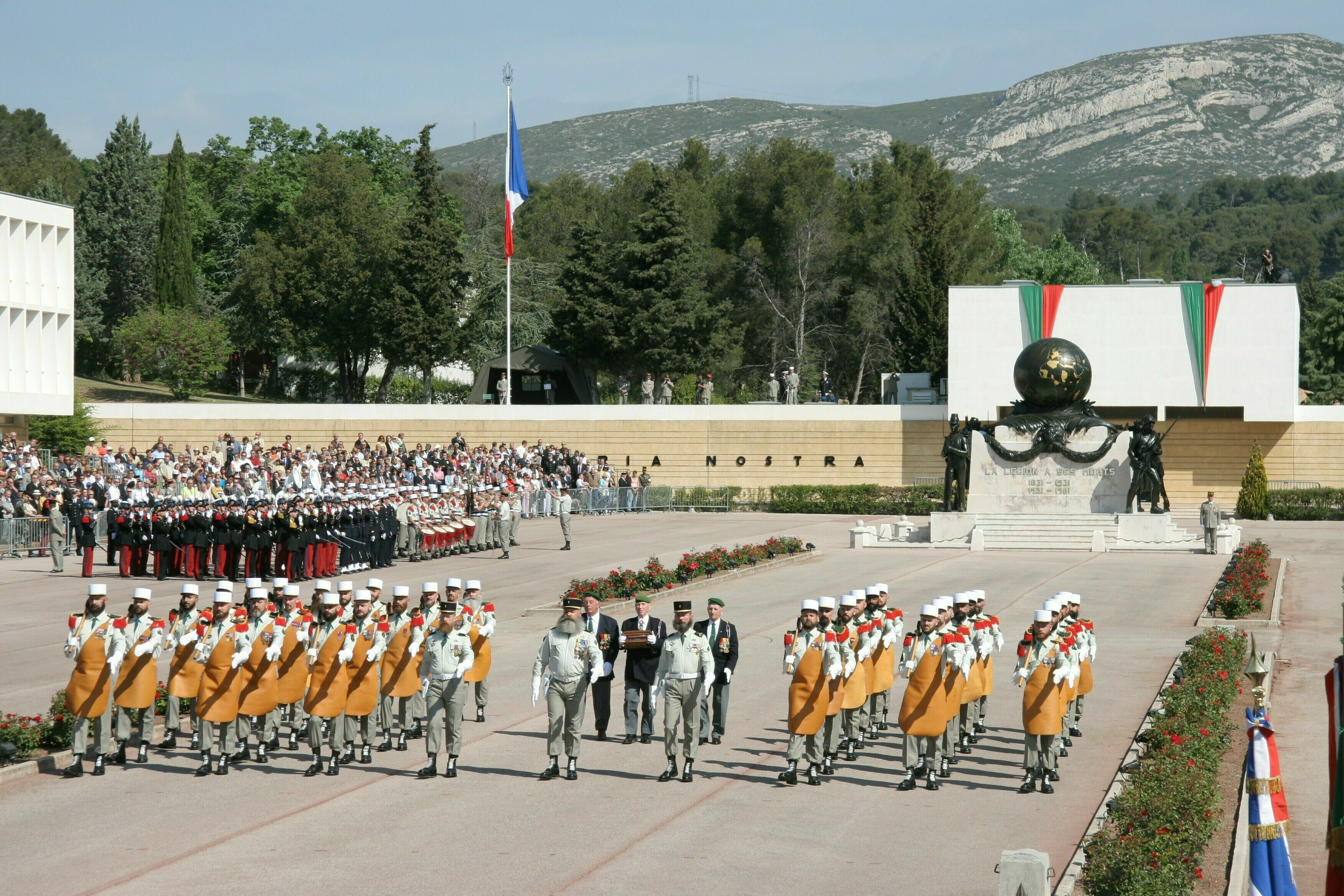
Each year, the Foreign Legion commemorates and celebrates Camarón at its headquarters in Aubagne and at the Bastille Day military parade in Paris; featuring the Pionniers leading and opening the way.

The 6th Foreign Engineer Regiment (French: 6^{e} régiment étranger de génie) was a unit of the Foreign Legion in the French Army, part of the rapid reaction force and component of the 6th Light Armoured Division, (6^{e} DLB). The 6th Foreign Engineer Regiment became the 1st Foreign Engineer Regiment (1^{e} REG) in 1999.

== Creation and names ==
The 6th Foreign Engineer Regiment (6^{e} REG) was created on July 1, 1984, at Laudun (Gard). The regiment was redesignated as the 1st Foreign Engineer Regiment (French: 1^{er} Regiment Etranger de Genie) on June 30, 1999, with the creation of the 2nd Foreign Engineer Regiment 2^{e} REG. At creation, the 6th Foreign Engineer Regiment (6^{e} REG) comprised a command, 3 combat companies, reconnaissance and support company (CCAS). On the eve of the regiment change to the 1st Foreign Engineer Regiment, 1er REG; the 6th Foreign Engineer Regiment already included:

- Legion Pionniers Groups
- 1st Amphibious Combat Company
- 2nd Combat Company of Assault Mechanized Engineering
- 3rd Combat Company of Aerotransportable Assault Engineering
- 4th Combat Company was created in 1996
- The Combat Reconnaissance Company ( CA ) compromising heavy equipments
- The Command and Logistics Company ( CCs )
- DINOPS Teams of Nautical Subaquatic Intervention Operational Detachment ( French: Détachement d'Intervention Nautique Operationnelle Subaquatique ) specialized in Parachute, Underwater Demolition and Diving.

== History -- garrison, campaigns and battles ==
- Chad (Operation Epervier)
- Iraq (Opération Daguet). During the Gulf War, DINOPS operated in support of the U.S. Army's 82nd Airborne Division, and provided EOD services to the division. After the ceasefire they conducted a joint mine clearing operation alongside a Royal Australian Navy Clearance Diver Team Unit.
- Somalia (Operation Oryx)
- Cambodia (United Nations Transitional Authority in Cambodia) (Opérations Marquis 1 et 2)
- Former Yugoslavia - Sarajevo (UNPROFOR)
- Former Yugoslavia - Sarajevo/Rajlovac (IFOR)
- Kosovo (Kosovo Force)

== Traditions ==
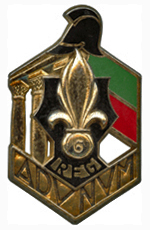
Regimental Insignia of the 6^{e} REG.

The 6th Foreign Engineer Regiment (6^{e} REG) inherits the traditions and battle honors of the 6th Foreign Infantry Regiment.

=== Insignias ===
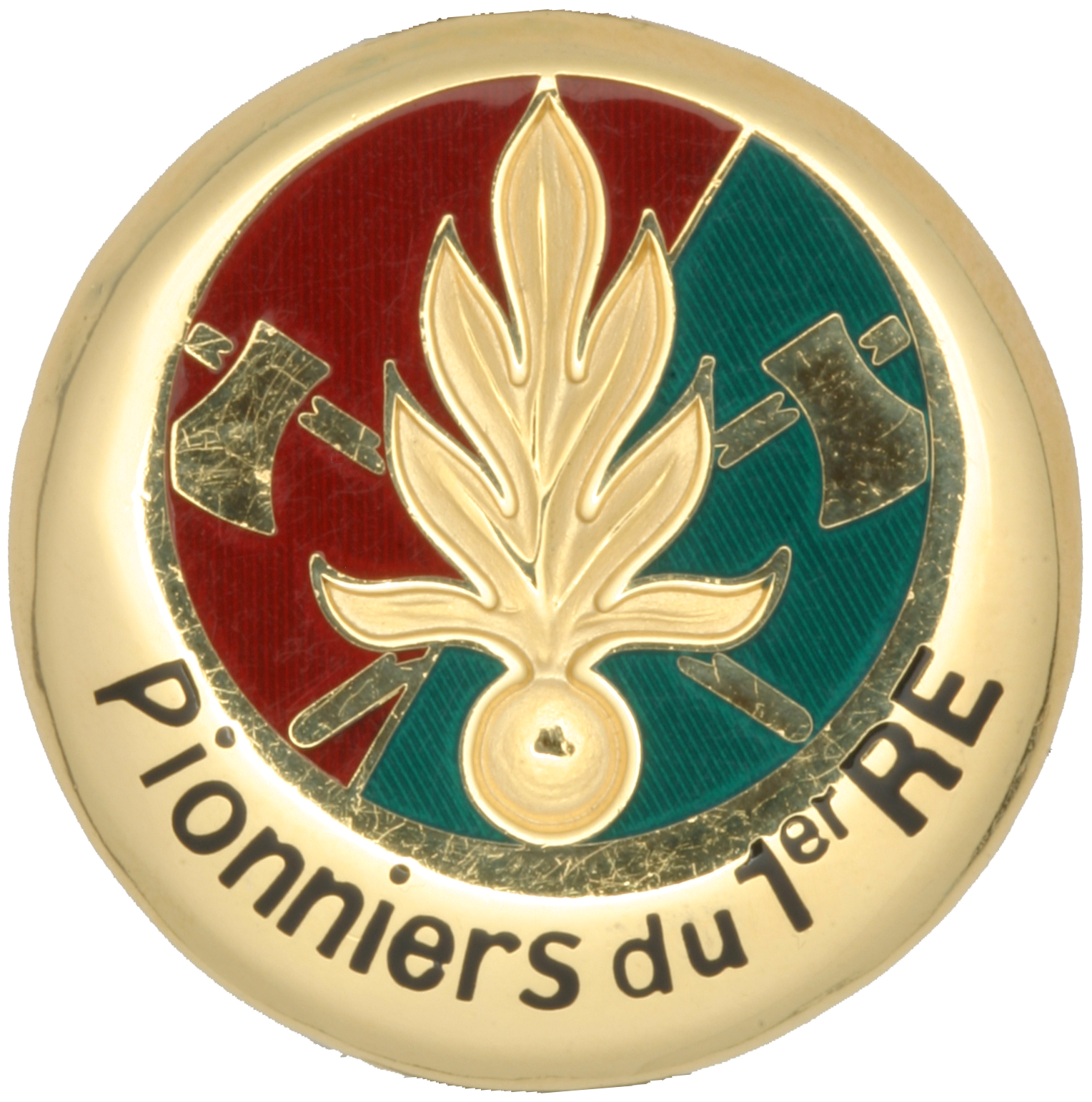
Insignia of the Pionniers of the 1st Foreign Regiment.

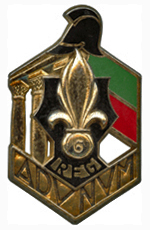
Insignia Type 1 of the 6th Foreign Engineer Regiment

The insignia symbolizes the 6th Foreign Infantry Regiment in the form of a hexagon, the three Roman columns of the temple of Jupiter at Baalbek to the left of the insignia and the symbols of the French Foreign Legion: red and green colors with a grenade with seven flames in its center.

The specialty of the regiment is symbolized by the "pot en tête" (metal military helmet) and armor used by sergeants at arms in the 13th century and later worn by pionniers sapeurs. The number of the regiment is indicated in the grenade underneath the armor while the motto of the regiment is inscribed to the left and right of the hexagon.

=== Regimental song ===
Chant de Marche : Sapeurs, mineurs et bâtisseurs

1er couplet

Sixième étranger d’infanterie.
Nous sommes tous les héritiers.
Syrie, Liban et Tunisie
Partout les combats sans pitié
Par le sang versé
Rendirent gloire.
Au vieux régiment du levant.
De nos anciens chantons la gloire
Et reprenons d’un même élan.

Refrain
Sapeurs, mineurs et bâtisseurs
À l’assaut légionnaire du Six
Et de la force des vainqueurs
Portons très haut notre devise
Parfois détruire.
Souvent construire.
Toujours servir avec Honneur et Fidélité.

2e couplet

Sixième étranger de génie Légion,
Dans les combats les plus violents,
En première ligne nous serons mis,
Comme les Pionniers en défilant.
Et pour la gloire de la Légion
Nous remplirons avec ardeur,
Dans le respect des traditions

Notre mission de constructeurs.

=== Decorations ===
The 6th Light Armoured Division, 6^{e} DLB operating the left flank of the 34 nations coalition during the Gulf War.

- La Croix de guerre des théâtres d'opérations extérieures with 1 palm, the regiment for engagement in Kuwait in Opération Daguet, 1990.
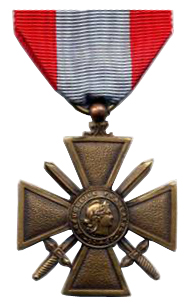
Croix de guerre des théâtres d'opérations extérieures

=== Battle Honors ===
- Camerone 1863
- Musseifre 1925
- Syria 1925-1926
- Kuwait 1990–1991

== Regimental Commanders ==
- 1984 - 1985 : Colonel Degre
- 1985 - 1987 : Colonel Boileau
- 1987 - 1989 : Colonel Martial
- 1989 - 1991 : Colonel Manet
- 1991 - 1993 : Colonel Petersheim
- 1993 - 1995 : Colonel Danigo
- 1995 - 1997 : Colonel Hourbon
- 1997 - 1999 : Colonel Ganascia

== See also ==
- Major (France)
- French Foreign Legion Music Band (MLE)
