= 2nd Foreign Engineer Regiment =

- 2^{e} Régiment étranger de génie
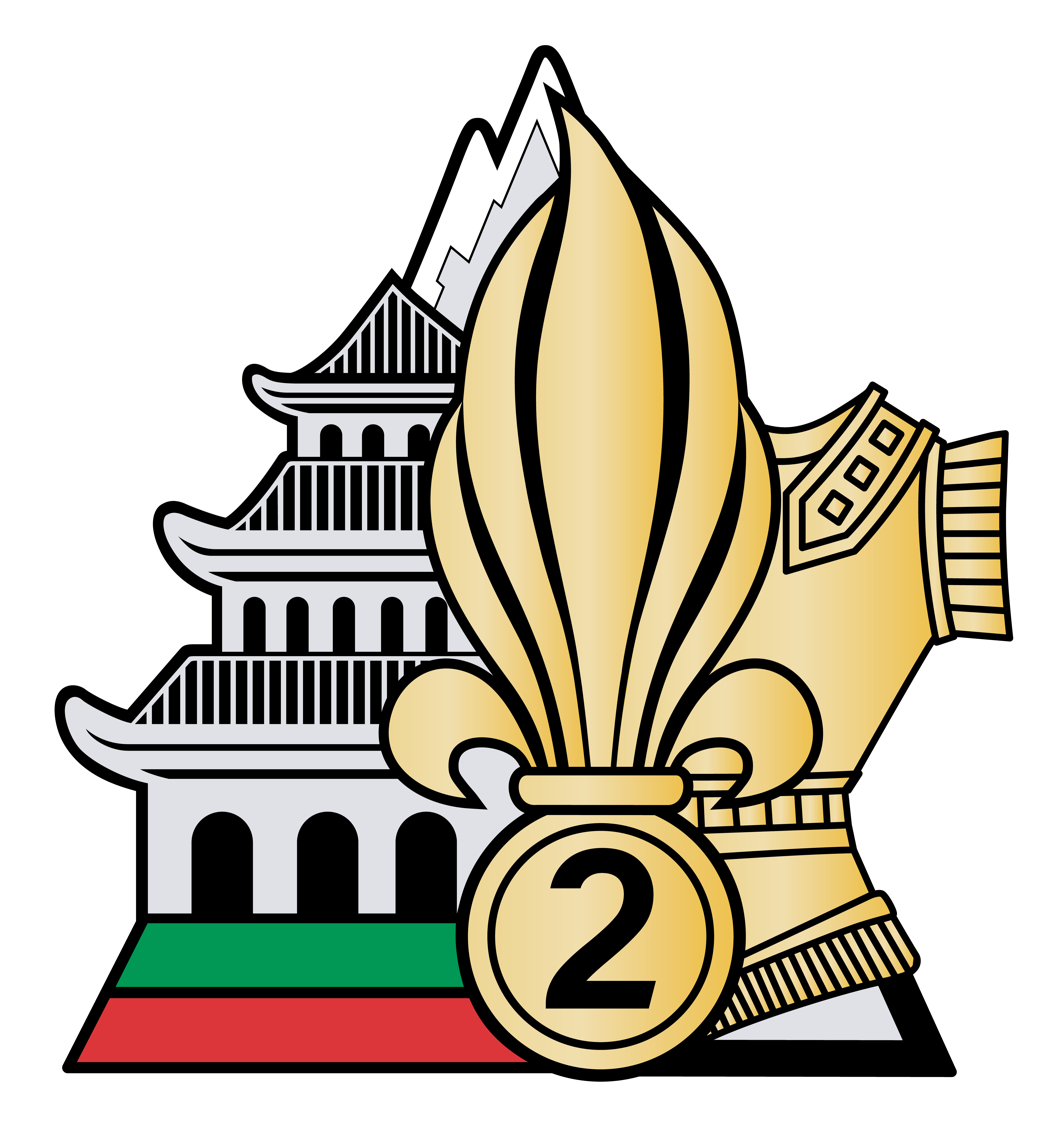
- Regimental badge of 2^{e} REG
- Active: 1 Jul. 1999 – present
- Country: France
- Branch: French Army
- Type: Engineer
- Role: Combat Engineer; Mountain warfare
- Size: ~925 men
- Part of: 27th Mountain Infantry Brigade; 1st Division
- Garrison/HQ: Saint Christol, France
- Motto: Rien n'empêche (Nothing Prevents)
- Colors: Green & Red
- March: Rien n'empêche
- Anniversaries: Camerone Day (30 April); Saint Barbara (4 December)
- Engagements: Opération Baliste Global War on Terrorism (2001–present): War in Afghanistan (2001–2021); Operation Enduring Freedom; Afghanistan-ISAF (Task Force LaFayette)
- Battle honours: Camerone 1863

Commanders
- Current commander: Colonel Emmanuel Combe

Insignia
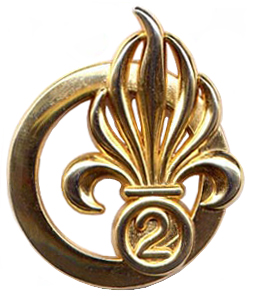
- Beret insignia of the 2nd Foreign Engineer Regiment
- Abbreviation: 2^{e} REG

The 2nd Foreign Engineer Regiment (French: 2^{e} Régiment Etranger de Génie, 2^{e} REG) is one of two combat engineer regiments of the Foreign Legion in the French Army. Since its creation in 1999, it has been based at Saint Christol, Vaucluse, southern France. The regiment provides the combat engineering component of the 27th Mountain Infantry Brigade.

== History ==
The regiment was created in 1999 and is an heir to one of the 18 combat engineer formations of the Foreign Legion in Indochina. The regiment carries some of the history of the 5th Foreign Infantry Regiment, "The Tonkin Regiment". The regiment is part of the French Army's military engineers.

The new legionnaires arrive from the 4th Foreign Regiment, the initial training regiment, while older legionnaires transfer from other Legion regiments.

Since creation, the regiment is stationed in Maréchal Koenig garrison, based on plateau Albion, in the commune of Saint-Christol, Vaucluse. This previously housed the 1st Strategic Missiles Groupment of the Strategic Air Forces, on Aerial Base 200 Apt-Saint-Christol.

As part of the 27th Mountain Infantry Brigade, the regiment gathers intelligence, direct combat, mobile support (demining, clearing paths, etc.) to any counter mobilities and the deployment amongst combat units. The particularity of the mountain brigade imposes adaptation to techniques that are demanding and specific in either relieving infantry units or replacing their combat role in operations of area control.

The regiment has been present on most exterior theatres of operations since creation. Soldiers of the regiment have served in Djibouti at the corps of the 13th Demi-Brigade of the Foreign Legion and in Afghanistan, Ivory Coast, French Guiana; similarly, at the corps of the 3rd Foreign Infantry Regiment, in the Balkans, in Martinique and metropole France during interior operations.

== Campaigns ( 1999–present) ==
Engineer Combat Missions

Since creation in 1999, the 2nd Foreign Engineer Regiment (French: 2^{e} Régiment Etranger de Génie, 2^{e} REG) has been present in the following theatres of exterior operations:

- Djibouti with the 13^{e} DBLE
- Afghanistan
- Ivory Coast
- French Guiana at the corps of the 3^{e} REI
- Balkans, Kosovo
- Martinique
- Lebanon in Opération Baliste launched by French President Jacques Chirac, during the month of July 2006. Following the Israeli bombardments of the bridges in Southern Lebanon, the world needed a combat engineer regiment to intervene quickly and efficiently in the reconstruction of bridges based on the old Bailey bridge system whose concept dates back to World War II. This intervention while very little publicized due to the estival period, allowed to consolidate the operational character in material of intervention of the military capability of combat engineers (French: génie de combat) in the Legion and more particularly at the 2^{e} REG.
- The regiment participates regularly in internal security operations: SATER Plan (French: Plan SATER), "SATER", (French: Sauvetage Aéro-Terrestre, SATER), (aero-terrestrial specialized French rescue put into motion at the departmental level with the objective of terrestrial search and precise localization of airborne capable civilian or military in distress) supported by elements of the French Air Force. Elements of SATER Plan was used to support protective operations around all the depots before the use of the euro, in 2001.
- The regiment intervenes regularly in internal security operations: Vigipirate, a mission shared and contributed by all other regiments.

Humanitarian Missions

- The regiment also served in metropole France, while barely being created, within operations of the Orsec Disposition (French: Dispositif Orsec), "ORSEC" (French: Organisation de la Réponse de SÉcurité Civile),(ORSEC - Response Organization for Civil Security; the response rescue organization responsible for managing natural disasters and catastrophes beyond the level of normal emergencies), at the end of 1999, following the storm thundering path of Cyclone Lothar and Martin which caused the devastation and destruction of a part of Europe.

== Organization ==
The regiment is composed of around 900 to 925 men organized into 6 companies.

- Compagnie de Commandement et de Logistique (CCL) - Command and Logistics Company
- Legion Pionniers Groups
- Compagnie d'Administration et de Soutien (CAS) - Administrative and Services Company
- 1^{re} Compagnie de Combat - 1st Combat Company (3 combat sections, a support section and a command section)
- 2^{e} Compagnie de Combat - 2nd Combat Company (3 combat sections, a support section and a command section)
- 3^{e} Compagnie de Combat - 3rd Combat Company (3 combat sections, a support section and a command section)
- Compagnie d'Appui (CA) - Support Company (5 specialist sections)
- PCG Teams (Combat Engineer Divers, French: Plongeurs du Combat du Génie) former DINOPS Teams of Nautical Subaquatic Intervention Operational Detachment ( French: Détachement d'Intervention Nautique Operationnelle Subaquatique ) specialized in Parachute, Underwater demolition, Diving and Mountain Commando Group ( GCM ) in some cases as double specialties.

== Traditions ==
=== Insignias ===
Insignia of the 27th Mountain Infantry Brigade, 27^{e} BIM

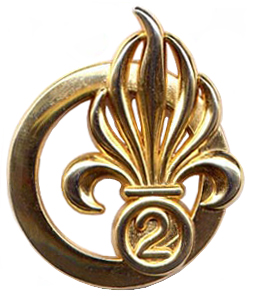
Beret insignia of the 2nd Foreign Engineer Regiment, 2^{e} REG

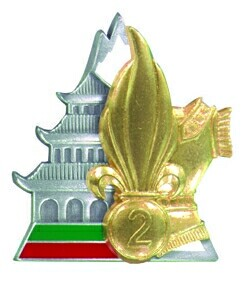
Regimental insignia of the 2nd Foreign Engineer Regiment, 2e REG

=== Regimental Colors ===
Regimental Colors of the 2nd Foreign Engineer Regiment

=== Regimental Song ===
Chant de Marche: Rien n'empêche featuring:

De la boue des rizières aux plateaux du Tonkin
Honneur, Fidélité pour unique refrain
Le feu, l'eau et la terre comme seul univers
Il s'avance et combat, le sapeur légionnaire,
Brisant tous les assauts quand la mitraille explose
Sur cette terre d'Indo où tant d'anciens reposent.

Dans le froid, la tourmente, à la mort à la vie
Rien n'empêche le deuxième étranger de génie. (bis)

Aujourd'hui la mémoire sonne le rappel.
Nous, légionnaires du 2 répondons à l'appel.
Ouvrir, tracer la route c'est pour le régiment
Passer coûte que coûte, voilà notre serment
Foi, vaillance et courage comme seul héritage
Nul obstacle et nul homme pour nous faire barrage.

Refrain

Sur les cimes de l'Alpe quand le combat résonne
Du fracas de la foudre et que l'orage tonne
En avant képis blancs, à nous les grands espaces.
En tout lieu en tout temps, il nous faut faire face.
Relever les défis, voilà notre ambition.
Ne jamais faire défaut, c'est notre tradition.

Refrain

=== Decorations ===
- croix de la Valeur militaire with one palm since January 3, 2012.
- Another citation for the croix de valeur militaire was attributed on June 20, 2013, the regiment since that date wears the fourragère with colors of the croix de la Valeur Militaire.
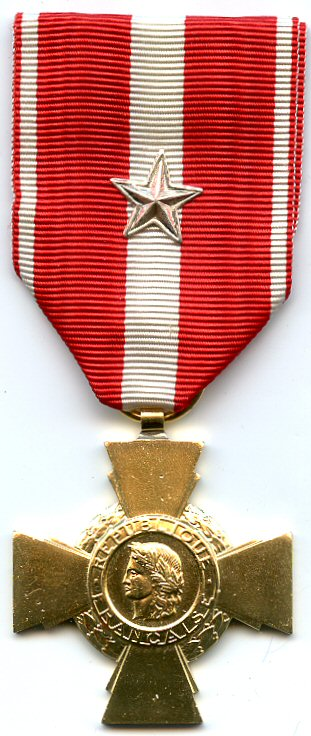
Croix de la Valeur militaire

=== Honors ===
==== Battle honours ====
- Camerone 1863

== Regimental Commanders ==
- 1999–2001 : colonel Nebois
- 2001–2003 : colonel Autran
- 2003–2005 : colonel Fradin
- 2005–2007 : colonel Boucher
- 2007–2009 : colonel Chavanat
- 2009–2011 : colonel Kirscher
- 2011–2013 : colonel Bonini
- 2013–2015 : colonel Reussner
- 2015–2017 : lieutenant-colonel De Sercey
- 2017–2021 : colonel De Boisfleury
- 2021 - 20** : colonel Emmanuel Combe

== See also ==
- French Army
- 27th Mountain Infantry Brigade (France)
- Major (France)
- Music of the Foreign Legion (MLE)
- 1st Foreign Engineer Regiment
- 6th Foreign Engineer Regiment
- List of French Foreign Legion units
