= 1st Foreign Engineer Regiment =

French combat engineer regiment

- 1^{er} Régiment étranger de Génie
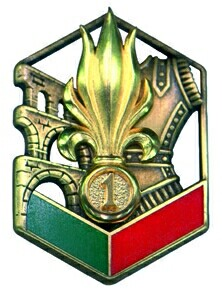
- Active: 6^{e} REI; 1939–1942; 1949–1955: 6^{e} REG & 1^{er} REG; 1 July 1984 – Present
- Country: France
- Branch: French Army
- Type: Engineer and former 6^{e} REG
- Role: Combat Engineer; Airborne Combat Engineer
- Size: ~ 950 men
- Part of: 6th Light Armoured Brigade; 3rd Division
- Garrison/HQ: Quartier General Rollet, Laudun, France
- Motto: AD UNUM (All to One End)
- Colors: Green & Red
- March: Le fanion claque et s'élève
- Mascot: Saint Barbara
- Anniversaries: Camerone Day (April 30)
- Engagements: Koweït 1990–1991 Global war on terrorism (2001–present): Operation Enduring Freedom; Afghanistan
- Battle honours: Camerone 1863; Koweït 1990–1991

Insignia
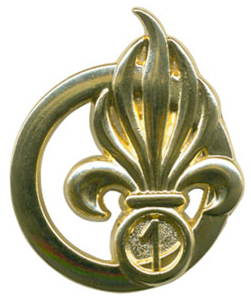
- Beret insignia
- Abbreviation: 1^{er} REG

The 1st Foreign Engineer Regiment (French: 1^{er} Régiment étranger de génie, 1^{er} REG) is one of two combat engineer regiments of the Foreign Legion in the French Army. The regiment provides the combat engineering component of the 6th Light Armoured Brigade.

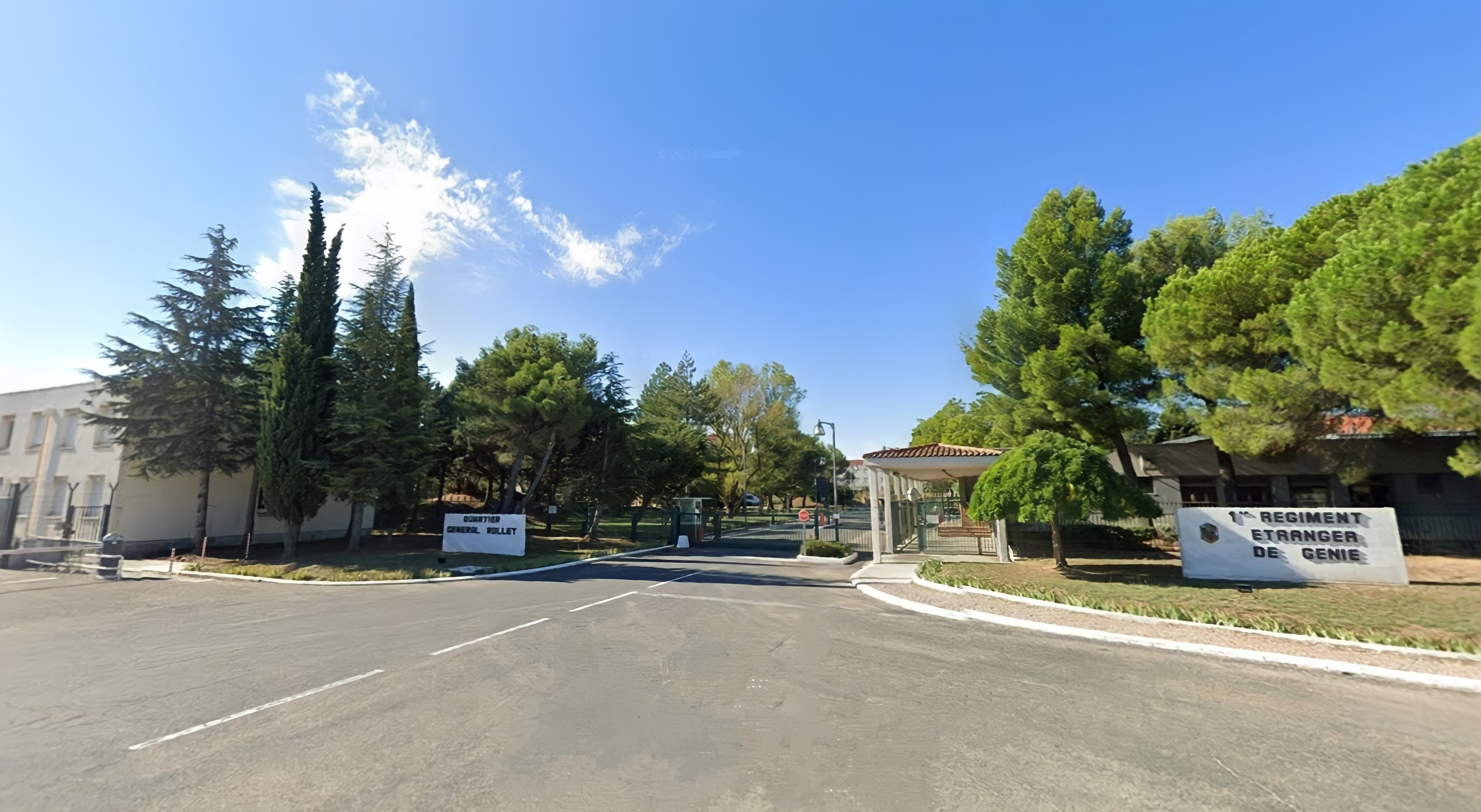
Barracks in Laudun-l'Ardoise.

It is currently stationed at Quartier General Rollet in Laudun-l'Ardoise, Gard, southern France.

== History, creation and different nominations ==
=== Heir to the 6th Foreign Infantry Regiment (6^{e} REI) ===
==== World War II ====
6th Foreign Infantry Regiment (1939 – 1/1/1942), (1949–1955)

The Levant Regiment (Régiment du Levant), the 6th Foreign Infantry Regiment (6^{e} Régiment Etranger d'Infanterie, 6^{e} REI) has existed through history on two occasions, in the Levant (Syria and Lebanon) from October 1, 1939 to January 1, 1942 and in Tunisia from April 1, 1949 to June 1955. At creation in 1939, the manpower came from the 1st, 4th, 6th battalions of the 1st Foreign Infantry Regiment, 1^{er} R.E.I (forming the 1st, 2nd, 4th battalions of the 6^{e} R.E.I) and the 2nd battalion of the 2nd Foreign Infantry Regiment (forming the 3rd battalion of the 6^{e} R.E.I) with the Legion Artillery Group of the Levant (Groupe d'Artillerie de Légion du Levant, G.A.L.L) compromising 3 artillery batteries. On August 23, 1941; the 6th Foreign Infantry Regiment embarked at Marseille; reduced from the results of combats to the 1st, 2nd, 3rd battalion and an artillery group, the regiment rallied to the Free French including other French constituents. The regiment was disbanded on January 1, 1942 after the British success in the Syria–Lebanon campaign and its legionnaires were transferred into the 1st Foreign Regiment and Communal Depot of the Foreign Regiments while 690 of the 6th Foreign Infantry Regiment opted for Charles de Gaulle. The regiment left Lebanon on August 16, 1941 and rejoined the Camp Idron (Pau) on August 25 before rejoining Sidi-bel-Abbès on December 3, 1941. During the regiment's dissolve on December 31, 1941, the legionnaires of the 6th Foreign Infantry Regiment were assigned to the later reconstituted 1st Foreign Marching Infantry Regiment (French: 1^{er} Régiment Etranger d'Infanterie de Marche, 1^{er} R.E.I.M) and the Marching Regiment of the Foreign Legion (French: Régiment de Marche de la Légion Etrangère, R.M.L.E).

On June 7, 1949, the 3rd battalion of the 6th Foreign Infantry Regiment embarked for Indochina and transformed to the 1st battalion of the 5th Foreign Infantry Regiment (French: 5e Regiment Etranger d'Infanterie, 5^{e} REI) on October 31. The 6th Foreign Infantry Regiment participated to the operations of maintaining order. The regiment notably engaged in the battles of djebel Selloum, Kasserine and djebel Gouleb. the 6th Foreign Infantry Regiment was dissolved for the second time on June 30, 1955 when the French Foreign Legion was in phase of reorganization following the return from Indochina.

=== Creation of the 6th Foreign Engineer Regiment ===
The 1st Foreign Engineer Regiment (1^{er} Régiment Etranger de Génie, 1^{er} REG) was created in 1984 as the 6th Foreign Engineer Regiment. On July 1, 1984, Foreign Legion Groupment, G.L.E Commander, général Jean-Claude Coullon assisted to the patronization ceremony marking the enacting of the 6th Foreign Engineer Regiment, 6^{e} R.E.G. For the first time in Legion history, the colors of a French foreign legion regiment included the inscription "Génie". The 6th Foreign Engineer Regiment (6^{e} R.E.G) received the regimental colors on October 12, 1984.

The creation of the 6th Foreign Engineer Regiment was delayed with a doubtful bet. The Legion had a long history of Fortification construction (French: génie bâtisseur), however, had little experience in combat engineering assault. Component of the Engineering Arm of the French Army trained the legionnaires in the various fields of specialties.

Elements of the regiment deployed in missions of short duration in Mayotte, Guyane, the Central African Republic and very quickly the regiment gained its first combat experience. For the actions of 6th Foreign Engineer Regiment (6^{e} R.E.G) in Tchad at Faya-Largeau in 1987, the 1st combat company was cited at the orders of the armed forces with the Croix de la Valeur militaire. In the same theater of combat engagement, Sergent-Chef Panic was killed by an Anti-tank mine on January 14, 1988 during a mission of opening and clearing the route.

In 1989, a detachment of the 6th Foreign Engineer Regiment trained Pakistanis in demining during Operation Salam in Pakistan. At Laudun, the mood and mode of the regiment was accelerated by the dispatching of combat companies, sections and small separate detachments tasked with punctual missions. In 1990, for the first time, the entire regiment intervened. In Iraq and Kuwait, the 6th Foreign Engineer Regiment participated to the victorious offensive of the Division Daguet part of Opération Daguet and was seen cited at the orders of the armed forces with Croix de guerre des théâtres d'opérations extérieures with a palm. During the Gulf War, D.I.N.O.P.S operated in support of the U.S. Army's 82nd Airborne Division, and provided the EOD services to the division. After the cease fire took hold they conducted a joint mine clearing operation alongside a Royal Australian Navy Clearance Diver Team Unit. Barely in return to Laudun, combat companies were seen redispatched to new theatres of combat operations. The regiment would be found in Cambodia, Bosnia, Somalia, Rwanda, Kosovo and other geographical locations.

== Campaigns ==
Engineer Combat Missions

The 6th Foreign Engineer Regiment (6^{e} REG) then 1st Foreign Engineer Regiment (1^{er} REG) engaged in:

- Somalia, (Operation Oryx)
- Cambodia, (United Nations Transitional Authority in Cambodia (Opérations Marquis 1 et 2)
- Ex-Yugoslavia – Sarajevo (UNPROFOR) and NATO
- Rwanda, (Operation Turquoise)
- Kosovo, (Operation Trident)
- Eritrea, United Nations Mission in Ethiopia and Eritrea
- Tchad (Operation Epervier)

Humanitarian Missions

- Operation Salam in Pakistan, initiating the formation of Afghans on techniques of mine clearing
- Operations in Indonesia, Sumatra during the 2004 Indian Ocean earthquake and tsunami
- Operations in France during intense floods
- Operation Tamour, protective security operations in support of medical treatment for children

=== 1st Foreign Engineer Regiment (1^{er} REG) ===
1st Foreign Engineer Regiment (1999–present)

The 1st Foreign Engineer Regiment (French: 1^{er} Regiment Etranger de Genie, 1^{er} REG) on was renamed on July 1, 1999 with the creation of the 2nd Foreign Engineer Regiment 2^{e} REG.

== Organization ==
The regiment is composed of 980 men organized into 8 companies.

- Compagnie de Commandement et de Logistique (CCL) – Command and Logistics Company
- Legion Pionniers Groups
- Compagnie d'Administration et de Soutien (CAS) – Administrative and Services Company
- 1^{er} Compagnie de Combat – 1st Combat Company (3 combat sections, a support section and a command section)
- 2^{e} Compagnie de Combat – 2nd Combat Company (3 combat sections, a support section and a command section)
- 3^{e} Compagnie de Combat – 3rd Combat Company (3 combat sections, a support section and a command section)
- 4^{e} Compagnie de Combat – 4th Combat Company ( 3 combat sections, a support section and a command section)
- Compagnie d'Appui (CA) – Support Company
- 5^{e} Compagnie – 5th Reserve Company
- PCG Teams (Combat Engineer Divers, French: Plongeurs du Combat du Génie) former DINOPS Teams of Nautical Subaquatic Intervention Operational Detachment (French: Détachement d'Intervention Nautique Operationnelle Subaquatique) specialized in Parachute, Underwater demolition and Diving.

== Traditions ==
=== Insignias ===
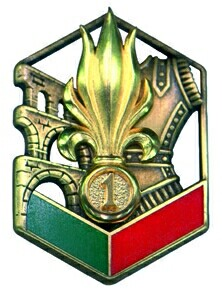
Regimental insignia of 1st Foreign Engineer Regiment, 1er REG

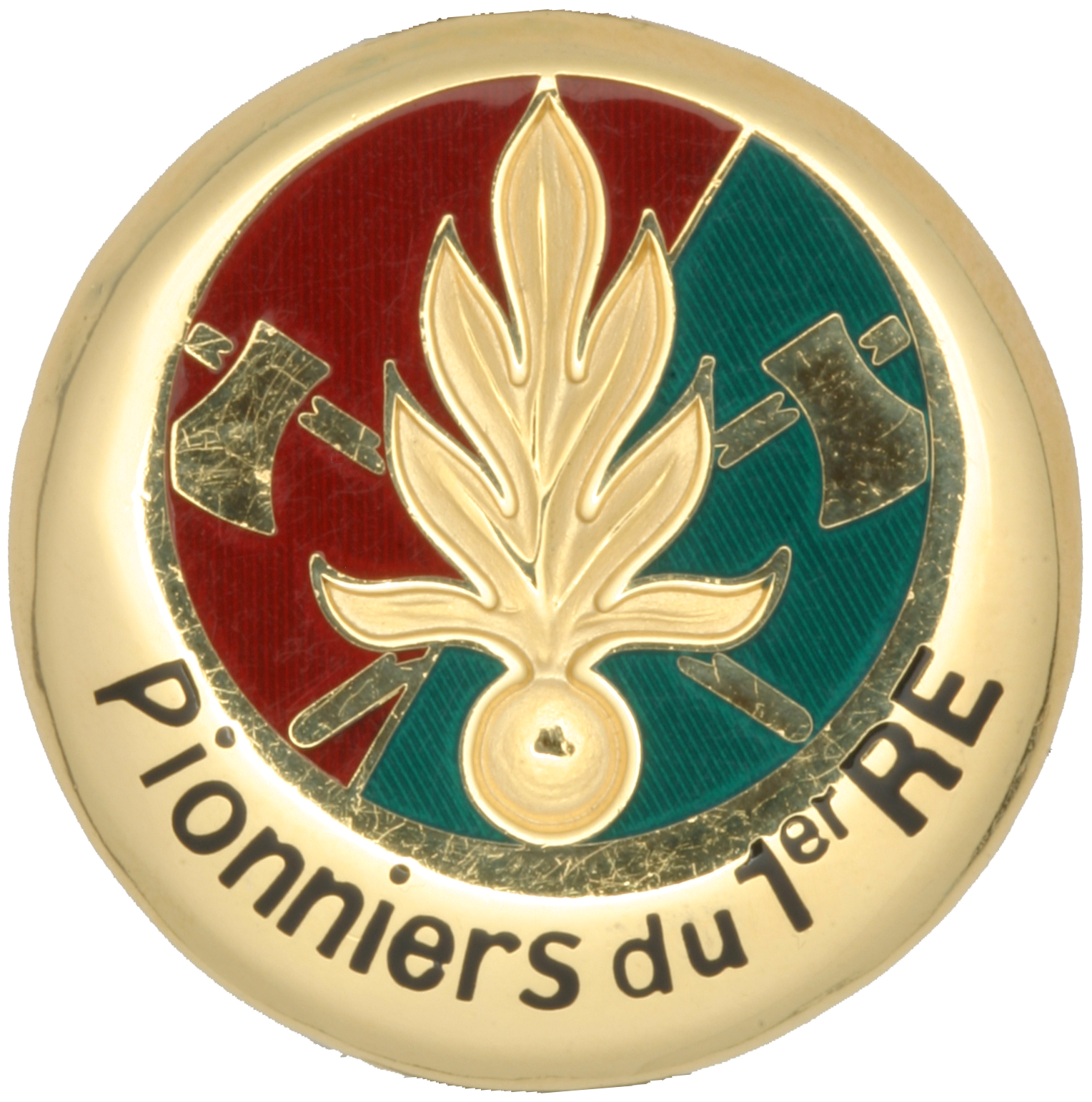
Insignia of the Pionniers of the 1st Foreign Regiment.

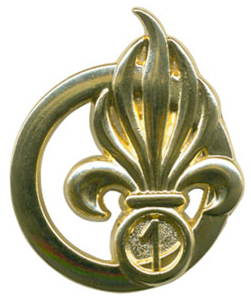
Beret insignia of the 1st Foreign Engineer Regiment, 1^{er} REG.

=== Regimental Colors ===
Regimental Colors of the 6th Foreign Infantry Regiment.

Regimental Colors of the 6th Foreign Engineer Regiment.

Regimental Colors of the 1st Foreign Engineer Regiment.

=== Regimental Song ===
Chant de Marche : Le fanion claque et s'élève featuring:

Le fanion claque et s'élève
Au dessus du pont romain.
Légionnaire marche sans trève
Sur les pas de nos anciens.
Les médailles sonnent sur le tablier,
Sur l'épaule brille la hache du pionnier.
Honneur fidélité.
Premier régiment étranger de génie
Grenades à sept flammes sur ta cuirasse brille.
Honneur fidélité

En sondant, les baïonnettes
Chantent toutes le même refrain,
Il faut faire place nette
Déminer tout le terrain.
Les grappins soulèvent des mines piégées
Il faut avancer au mépris du danger.
Honneur fidélité.
Premier régiment étranger de génie
Grenades à sept flammes sur ta cuirasse brille.
Honneur fidélité.

Une seule devise aux lèvres :
Légio patria nostra.
Le lance flammes ou la portière
Légionnaire tu serviras.
Quand le vert et rouge de ton fanion surgit
C'est la débandade dans les rangs ennemis.
Honneur fidélité.
Premier régiment étranger de génie
Sapeur de combat sans crainte ni répit.
Honneur fidélité

=== Decorations ===
- La Croix de la Valeur militaire, 1st combat company, for engagement in Tchad in 1987.
- La Croix de guerre des théâtres d'opérations extérieures, the 6th Foreign Engineer Regiment 6^{e} REG, for engagement in Kuwait in Opération Daguet, 1990.
- La Croix de la Valeur militaire, with 1 palm, the regiment, as of 2009 for engagement in Afghanistan part of Operation Pamir French: Opération Pamir)

=== Battle honours ===
- Camerone 1863
- Koweït 1990–1991

== Regimental Commanders ==
6th Foreign Engineer Regiment (6^{e} R.E.G)

- 1984: Colonel Degré
- 1985: Colonel Boileau
- 1987: Colonel Martial
- 1989: Colonel Manet
- 1991: Colonel Petersheim
- 1993: Colonel Danigo
- 1995: Colonel Houbron
- 1997: Colonel Ganascia

1st Foreign Engineer Regiment (1^{er} R.E.G)

- 1999: Colonel Ripoll
- 2001: Colonel Rittimann
- 2003: Colonel Breuille
- 2005: Colonel Lejeune
- 2007: Colonel Cornefert
- 2008: Colonel Philippe
- 2009: Colonel Nachez
- 2011: Colonel Gombaud
- 2013: Colonel Coulet

1st Foreign Engineer Regiment (1^{er} R.E.G)

- 2015: Colonel Phelut
- 2017: Colonel Pinard-Legry
- 2019: Colonel Fleuret
- 2021: Colonel Perrier
