= Camarón de Tejeda (municipality) =

- Municipality
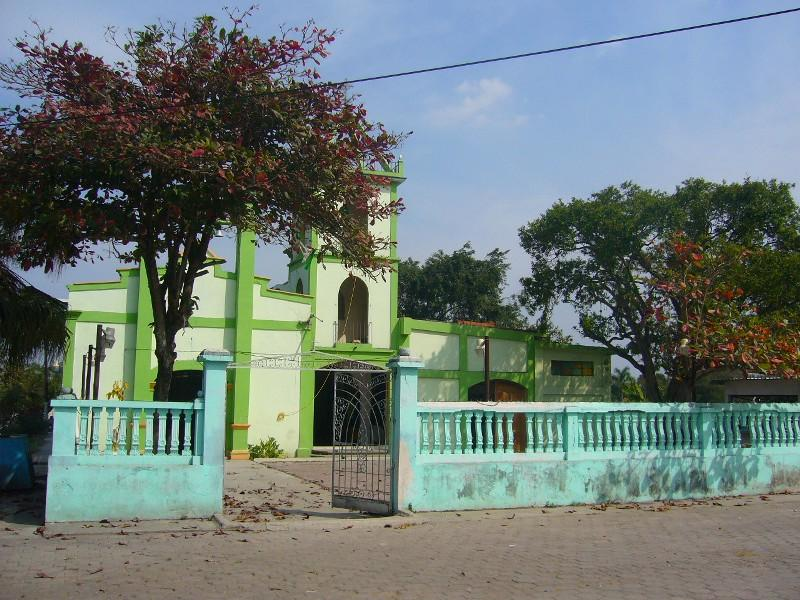
- Church in Camarón de Tejeda

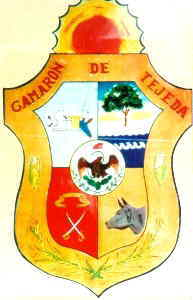
- Coat of arms

- Location in Mexico
- Coordinates: 19°01′00″N 96°37′0″W
- Country: Mexico
- State: Veracruz
- Municipal seat: Camarón de Tejeda

Government
  - Municipal President: Carlos Fermín Alarcón Fernández (PRI)

Area
  - Total: 74.38 km^{2} (28.72 sq mi)
- Elevation: 320 m (1,050 ft)

Population (2005)
  - Total: 5,660
  - Density: 76.1/km^{2} (197/sq mi)
  - Municipal seat: 2,019
- Time zone: UTC-6 (Central (US Central))
- Website: www.camarondetejeda.gob.mx

Camarón de Tejeda Municipality is a municipality in the Mexican state of Veracruz. It is located in the state's southeast, in the Las Montañas region. The municipal seat is the city of Camarón de Tejeda. It covers a total of 74.38 km^{2}.

At the 2005 INEGI Census, the municipality reported a population of 5,660, of whom 2019 lived in the municipal seat.

== Geography ==
The municipality of Camarón de Tejeda is delimited to the east by the Soledad de Doblado, to the south and west by the Paso del Macho, and to the west by Zentla.

== History ==
Camarón de Tejeda is famous for the Battle of Camarón, fought on 30 April 1863 between the French Foreign Legion and the Mexican Army.
