= Camarón de Tejeda =

Town and municipal seat in Veracruz, Mexico

- Town & municipal seat
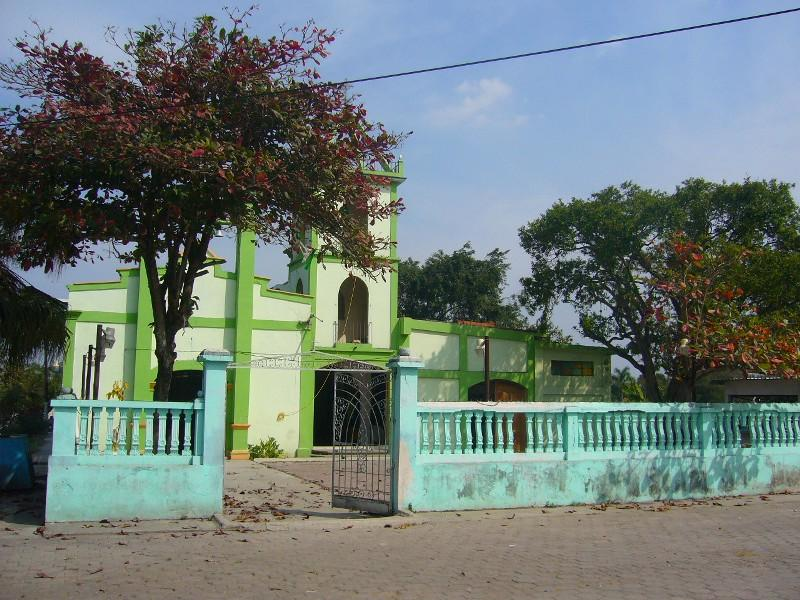
- Church in Camarón de Tejeda

- Location in Mexico
- Coordinates: 19°01′00″N 96°37′0″W
- Country: Mexico
- State: Veracruz
- Municipality: Camarón de Tejeda (municipality)

Government
  - Municipal President: Carlos Fermín Alarcón Fernández (PRI)
- Elevation: 320 m (1,050 ft)

Population (2005)
  - Total: 2,019
  - Municipality: 5,660
- Time zone: UTC-6 (Central (US Central))
- Climate: Aw
- Website: www.camarondetejeda.gob.mx

Camarón de Tejeda is a town in the Mexican state of Veracruz. It serves as the municipal seat for the surrounding municipality of the same name. It is most famous for the 1863 Battle of Camarón at the town's Hacienda Camarón.

In the 2005 INEGI Census, Camarón de Tejeda reported a population of 2,019, with 5,660 in the surrounding municipality. The area is essentially rural with a population density of 32 people/km^{2}. The town is named for the large number of shrimp (camarón in Spanish) found in a small river in the area.

== History ==
Camarón was an ancient Totonac town called Temaxcal. At the town's hacienda, a Mexican Army of more than 3000 triumphed over 65 troops of the French Foreign Legion in the Battle of Camarón on 30 April 1863.

After the battle, the words "de Tejeda" were added to the town's name by Mexican Colonel Francisco de Paula Milán to honor pro-Madero politician Sixto Adalberto Tejeda Olivares (1883-1960), originally of Chicontepec.

Before having its current name, the town was known by several others, including Villa Tejeda in 1927, and Adalberto Tejeda in 1955.

== Geography ==
The town is located in the central part of the Veracruz, at 19° 01’ north latitude, 96° 37’ west longitude, at an altitude of 320 meters above sea level.

== Hacienda Camarón ==
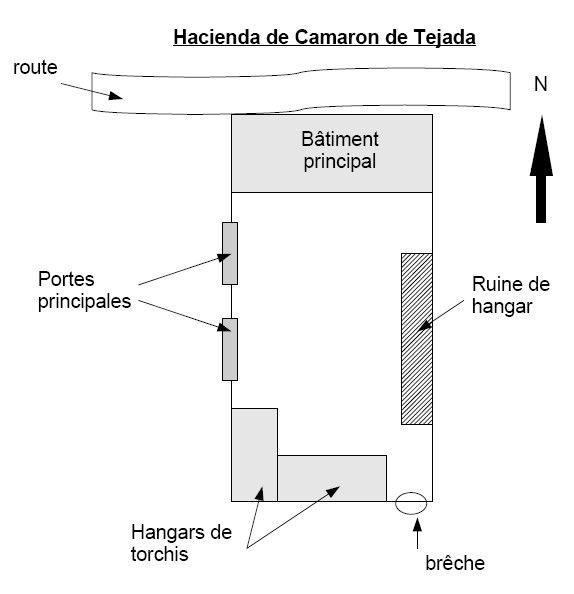
Map of the Hacienda

The Hacienda Camarón is located to the right of the road from Mexico City.

It is composed of a courtyard at its center, 50 meters on each side, enclosed by a 3-meter-high (9.8 ft) wall. Two large doors open to the west.

The north section of the structure borders the road and has many rooms for housing, aligned east-to-west.

To the south of the courtyard are found two large storage rooms. The first remains largely intact and forms the supports for the second, situated at a southwest angle to the corral, being nothing but some pieces of wood supported by a brick wall, with a thatched roof. Facing it at a southeast angle are the remains of another storage room. This, with its brick wall, formerly supported the building's frame.

On the south side of the structure, the final storage room has a space through which a person can pass.

Opposite the Hacienda, on the other side of the road, are two condemned houses and the ruins of ten Indian boxes^{[?]}.
