= Jean Danjou =

French Foreign Legion officer (1828–1863)

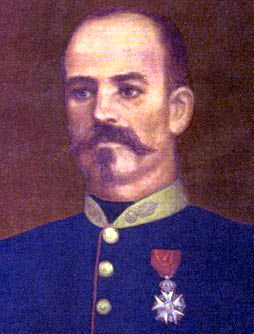
- Born: 15 April 1828; Chalabre, France
- Died: 30 April 1863 (aged 35) Camarón de Tejeda, Mexico
- Allegiance: France
- Service years: 1849–1863
- Rank: Captain
- Commands: Légion Étrangère
- Conflicts: Crimean War: Siege of Sevastopol; Franco-Austrian War: Battle of Magenta; Battle of Solferino; French intervention in Mexico: Battle of Camarón †
- Awards: Knight of the Legion of Honor

Jean Danjou (French pronunciation: [ʒɑ̃ dɑ̃ʒu]; 15 April 1828 – 30 April 1863) was a decorated captain of the Foreign Legion in the French Army. He commanded the two lieutenants and 62 legionnaires who fought the Battle of Camarón during the French intervention in Mexico, in which he was killed.

== Education ==
Jean Danjou was born in Chalabre. He enrolled in the École Spéciale Militaire de Saint-Cyr, the foremost French military academy, and graduated from the academy at the age of 20. He was assigned to the 51st Regiment of the Line.

== Military career ==
In 1852, he transferred to the 2e Régiment Étranger d'Infanterie. He was transferred to Algeria, to assist French colonization efforts, including the campaigns of Kabylie. He lost his left hand during a mapping assignment, on 1 May 1853, when his musket exploded. He designed a wooden prosthetic hand, which he used for the rest of his life. Danjou was promoted to 1st lieutenant on 24 December 1853.

As a 1st lieutenant, Danjou was part of the French army that fought in the Crimean War, and served during the Siege of Sevastopol. He was promoted to captain on 9 June 1855.

His next campaign during the Austro-Sardinian War, where in 1859 he fought in the Battle of Magenta and the Battle of Solférino.

After serving in Morocco for some time, Danjou was part of the French expeditionary corps sent to Mexico in 1862. He was the quartermaster of Colonel Jeanningros, who was in charge of the Foreign Legion regiment in Mexico. It was the duty of the Legion to ensure the movement and safety of French supply convoys.

On 29 April, Colonel Jeanningros was informed that an important convoy was on its way to Puebla with three million francs and material and munitions for the siege. Danjou decided to send a company to escort the convoy. The 3rd company of the Foreign Regiment was assigned to this mission, but had no officers available. Danjou himself took command. Two other officers volunteered for this mission: 2nd Lt. Jean Vilain, Regimental Financial Officer, and 2nd Lt. Clément Maudet, Regimental Colours-Bearer.

== The Battle of Camarón ==
At 1 a.m. on 30 April, the 3rd company was on its way, with three officers and 62 men. At 7 a.m., after a 15 miles (24 km) march, it stopped at Palo Verde to rest. Soon after, a Mexican force of 3,000 soldiers (800 cavalry and 2,200 infantry) was spotted. Danjou had the company take up a square formation and, even though retreating, he drove back several cavalry charges, inflicting the first heavy losses on the enemy.

Looking for a more defensible position, Danjou decided to make a stand at the nearby Hacienda Camarón, an inn protected by a 10-foot (3.0-meter) high wall. His plan was to tie up the enemy forces to prevent any attacks on the nearby convoy. While the legionnaires prepared a defense of the inn, the Mexican commander, Colonel Milan, demanded that Danjou and his men surrender, pointing out the fact that the Mexican Army was greatly superior in number. Danjou went around to each of his men with a bottle of wine and made them all take a solemn oath not to surrender.

At noon, Danjou was shot in the chest and died. His soldiers continued to fight until 6 p.m. despite overwhelming odds and extreme heat. The 60 men, who had had nothing to eat or drink since the day before, resisted many charges of the Mexican army. The last five survivors were all down to their very last bullet. Instead of dishonoring themselves, they decided to charge with fixed bayonets. When they did, the Mexican commander ordered his troops to cease fire. Out of admiration for their courage, he spared the surviving men and allowed them to form an honour guard for the body of Captain Danjou. They were released to return to France. This story has become legendary in French military history.

Danjou was buried on 3 May 1863 in Camarón.

== Commemoration of the battle ==
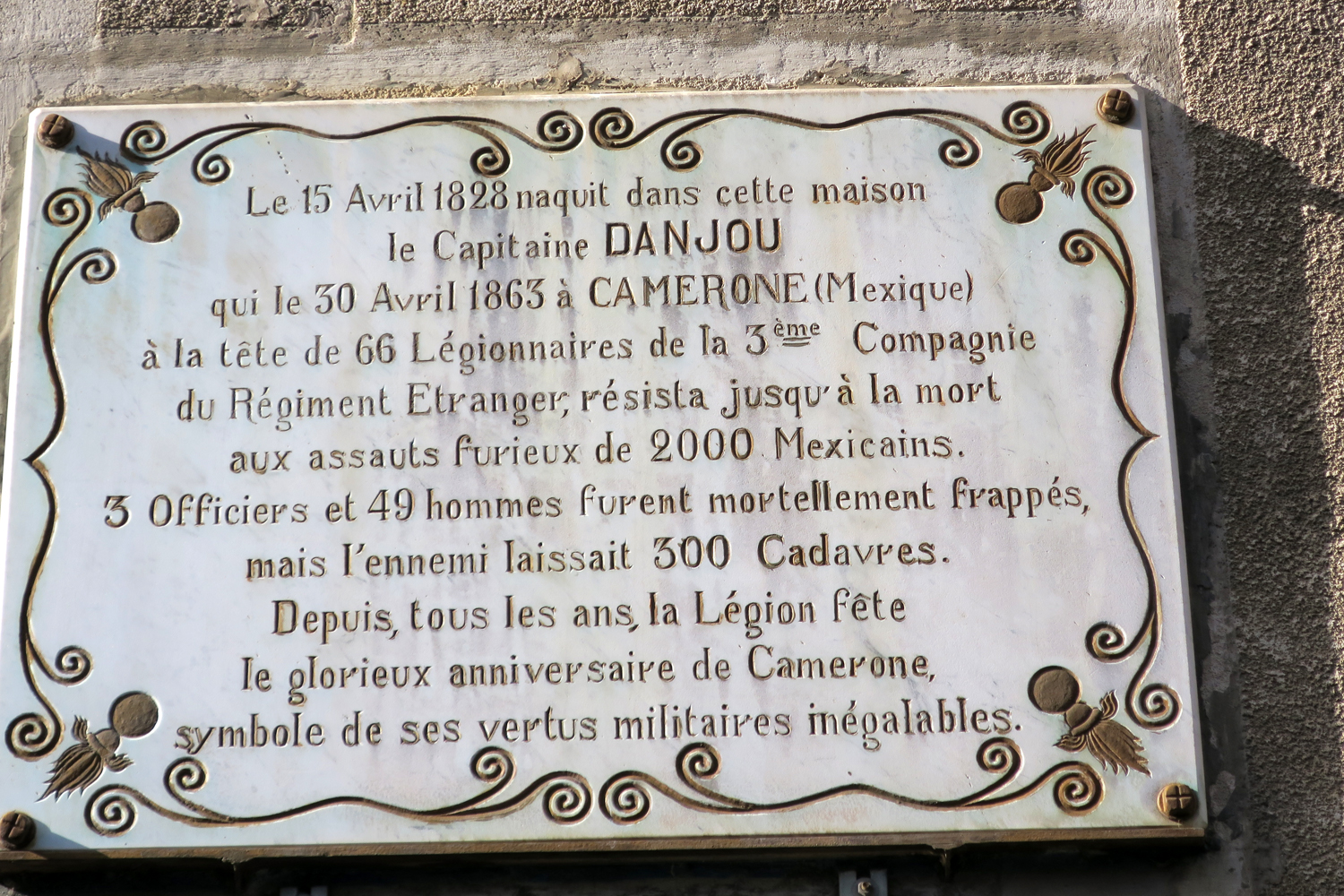
The inscription reads: On April 15, 1828, in this house was born Captain DANJOU who on April 30, 1863, in Camaron (Mexico), at the head of 66 legionaries of the 3rd Company of the Foreign Regiment, resisted until death the furious assaults of 2000 Mexicans. 3 officers and 49 men were fatally wounded, but the enemy left 300 corpses. Since then, every year, the Legion celebrates the glorious anniversary of Camerone, symbol of its unrivaled military virtues. Photo Jules Rhin.

A commemorative marble plaque is affixed to the facade of the birthplace of Captain Danjou, in Chalabre (Aude, France). Every year, as close as possible to April 30, a squad of the Regiment of the French Foreign Legion at Castelnaudary comes to pay him military honors and the colonel of the regiment lays a wreath at the foot of the facade. Other commemorations also take place in Aubagne (Bouches-du-Rhone, France) where the headquarters of the Legion is located.

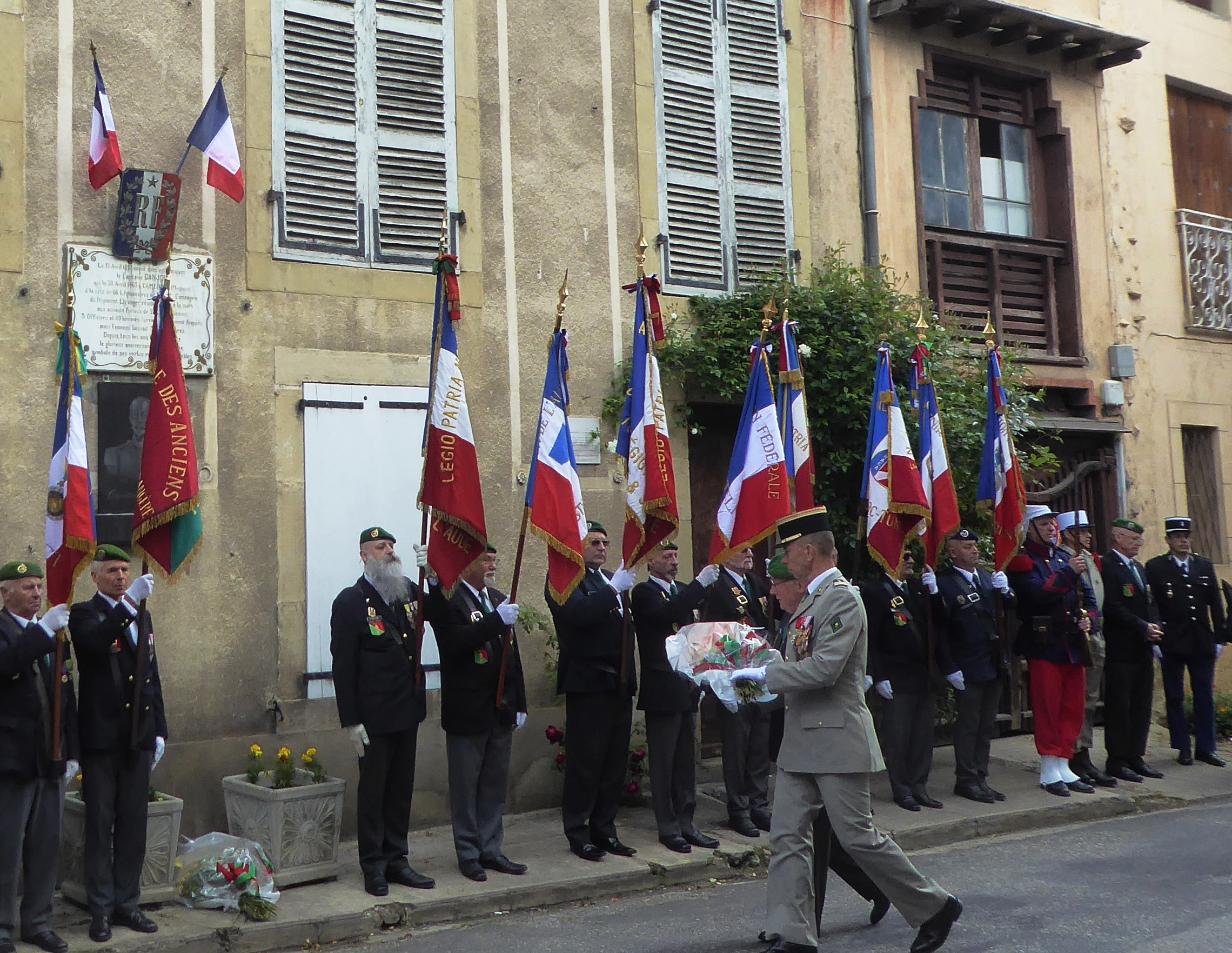
Celebration in front of the birthplace of Captain Danjou in Chalabre (Aude France). Photo Philippe Vidal.

After the battle, a Mexican named Ramirez discovered and took Danjou's wooden hand. Ramirez was soon arrested and the hand retrieved by Lieutenant Karl Grübert of the Austrian army, which replaced the Foreign Legion in this conflict on 17 July 1865. Today, Danjou's wooden hand is paraded annually on April 30, Camerone Day.

== Prosthetic hand ==
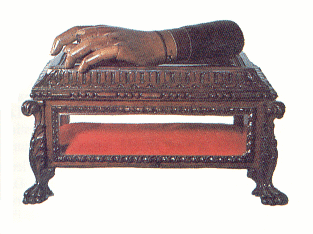
Wooden hand of Jean Danjou

When the Legion moved to France, Danjou's wooden hand was taken to Aubagne, where it remains in the Legion Museum of Memory.

30 April is celebrated as "Camerone Day", an important day for the Legionnaires, when the wooden prosthetic hand of Capitaine Danjou is brought out for display. Captain Danjou appears in Ian Colquhoun's 2014 historical novel 'Le Boudin – The Demons of Camerone' – Colquhoun, like Danjou, is an amputee.
