= Foreign Legion Pioneers (Pionniers) =

- Pionniers de la Légion étrangère
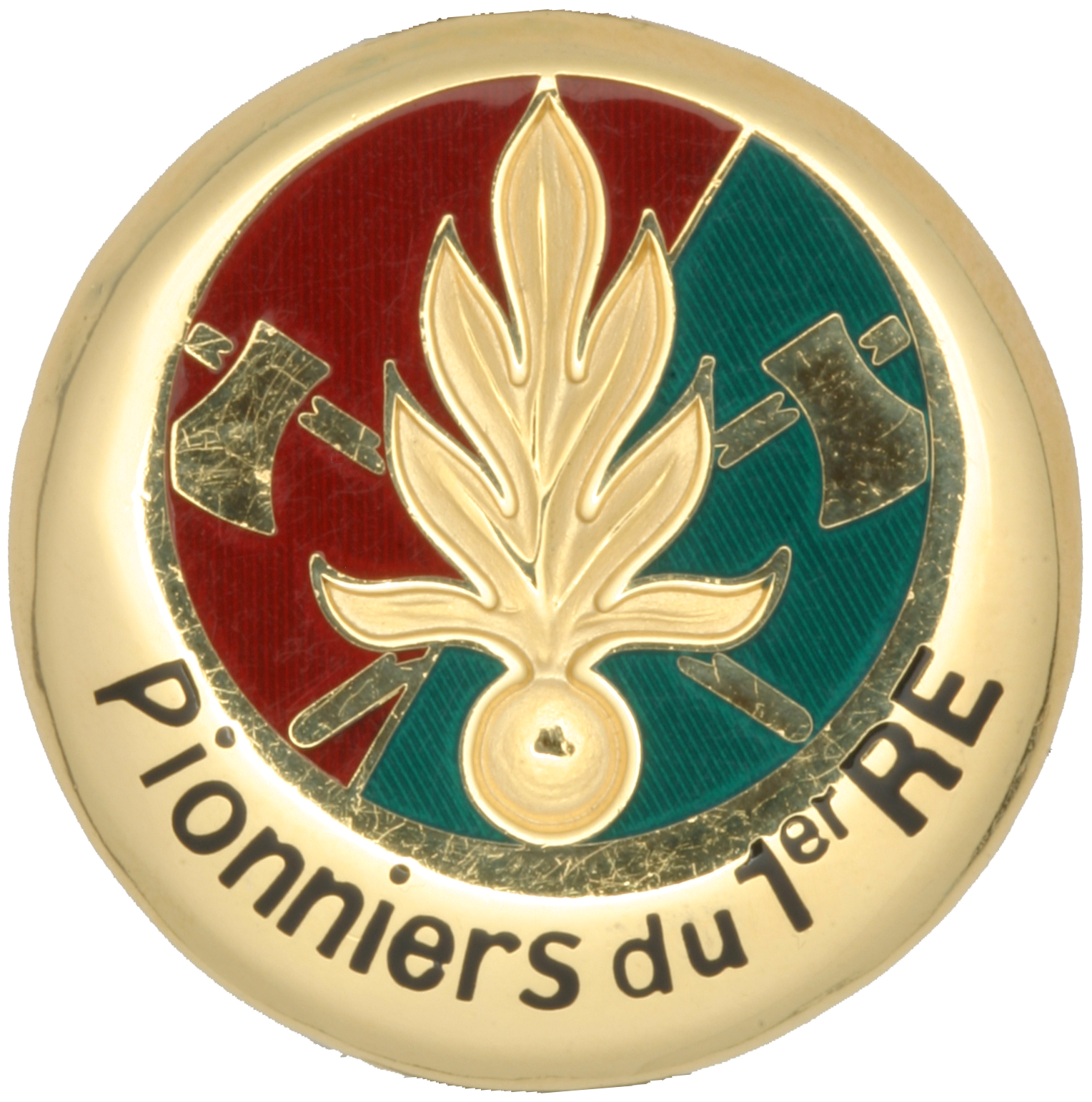
- Pionniers of the 1st Foreign Regiment 1^{er} RE
- Active: 1831–Present
- Country: France
- Branch: French Army
- Garrison/HQ: Aubagne, France
- Nickname(s): Pionniers de la Légion
- Motto(s): Honneur et Fidélité
- Colors: Green and Red
- March: Nous sommes tous des volontaires (We are all volunteers)
- Battle honours: Camerone 1863

Commanders
- Commandant de La Légion Etrangère (France) Commandant of the Foreign Legion (English): Foreign Legion Command
- Ceremonial chief: The Sous-Officiers
- Notable commanders: Paul-Frédéric Rollet

The Pioneers of the Foreign Legion (French: Les Pionniers de la Légion étrangère) are a pioneer unit of the French Foreign Legion. Considered a "unit of tradition", they march at the head of Foreign Legion detachments during ceremonial parades. The Legion's Pioneers are bearded, wear buffalo leather aprons (tablier de buffle), and carry polished axes on their shoulders.

The unit is the only one of its kind remaining in service in the French Armed Forces.

== History of the Pionniers ==
During the 18th century; small pioneer detachments, carrying axes and other working tools, served with the grenadier companies of the infantry regiments of the French Royal Army. In battle they joined with the grenadiers who led infantry assaults on fortified positions. The primary purpose of the pioneers was to use their axes to demolish the obstacles and barriers created by the enemy. Away from the battlefield the pioneers served as the regimental tradesmen, constructing and repairing buildings; or clearing access through forested terrain.

The need for permanent units of pioneers to form part of the newly-raised volunteers of the French Revolution was an uncertain one. However the pionniers reappeared under the French Consulate, wearing bearskin fur caps without the metal front plates of the grenadiers. These units were dissolved in 1818 but recreated in 1822.

The Foreign Legion adopted pioneer detachments in 1831. Originally of practical use in the difficult terrain of Algeria, the Legion's pioneers have survived to the present day as a visible symbol of its tradition of Honneur et Fidélité. The pioneer detachments of the other infantry regiments of the French Army were disbanded under the Third Republic.

== Pioneers of Tradition ==
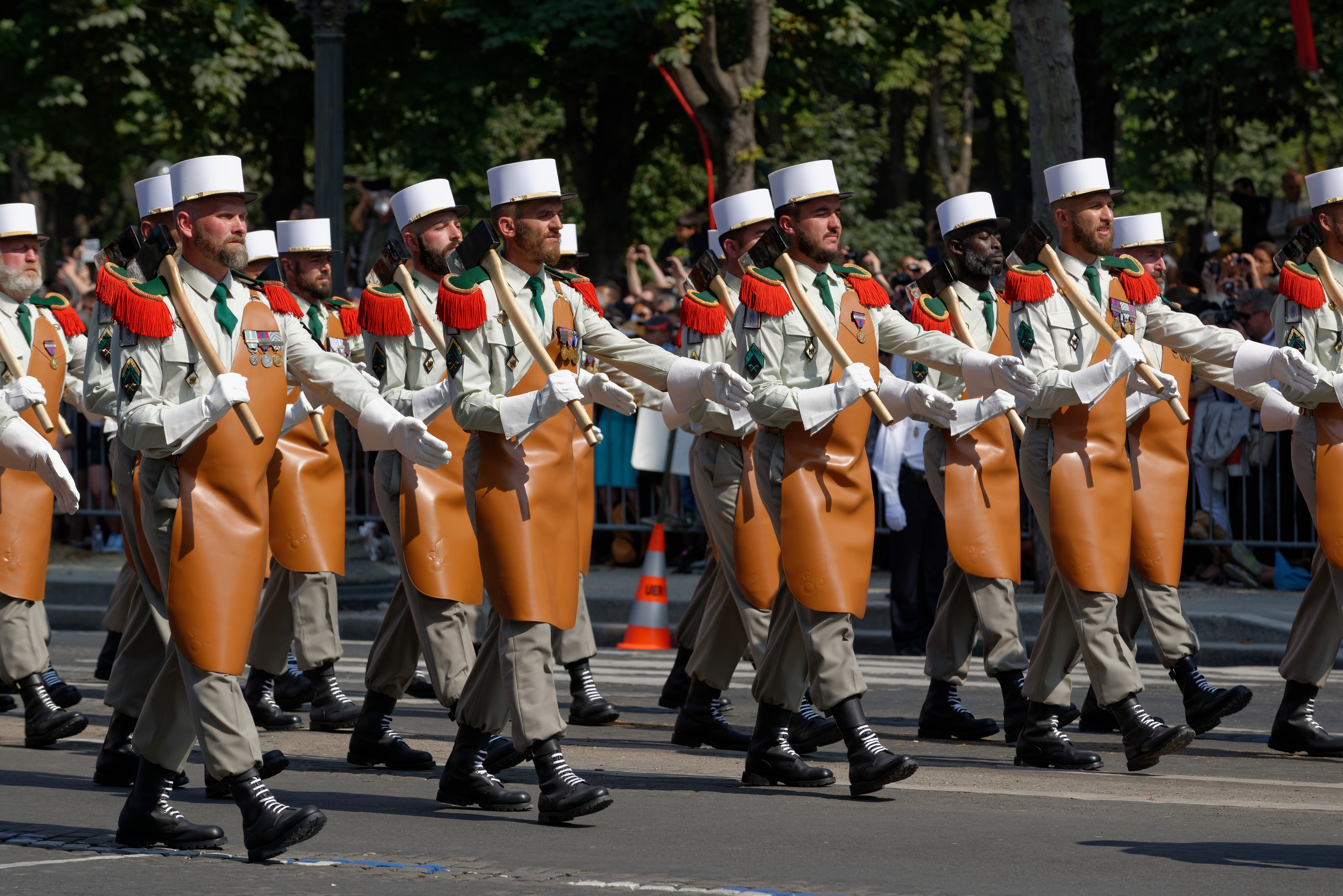
Pionniers of the 1st Foreign Regiment 1^{er} RE.

In 1920 and 1921, two sapper combat companies of pionniers were created at the corps of the four foreign legion regiments operating in Morocco. These units are tasked with engineering functions (French: génie militaire), mainly in terms of infrastructure (construction of roads, bridges, tunnels, etc.). These units did not carry any axes; they did, however, wear the pioneers' shoulder sleeve traditional patch on all uniforms.

On April 30, 1931, during the 100th year celebration of the Foreign Legion, orchestrated by general Paul-Frédéric Rollet, a section (platoon) of the sapper combat company of the 3rd Foreign Infantry Regiment paraded at the head of all parading troops while bearing the emblems of the pionniers, reclaiming the traditions of their predecessors.

Pionnier units were integrated officially within the ranks of tradition in 1946 by Colonel Louis-Antoine Gaultier.

== Function of Tradition ==
Certain regiments of the French Foreign Legion (1^{e} R.E., 2^{e} R.E.G, 3^{e} R.E.I, 4^{e} R.E., D.L.E.M) house even, punctually or permanently, groups of pionniers (in general, one Sous-Officiers and 9 Legionnaires); however, the section of tradition is part of the 1st Foreign Regiment of Aubagne and is composed of 3 Sous-Officiers and 36 Legionnaires.

This section (platoon) of pionniers of the 1st Foreign Regiment is the one that opens the way for the Legion heading the 14th of July military parade on the Champs-Élysées in Paris. The same section of pionniers is also employed during the commemoration ceremony of the Battle of Camarón, on April 30, at the 1st Foreign Regiment 1^{er} RE to frame protect the holder of the wooden hand of captain Jean Danjou. During both yearly ceremonies, the Pionniers march to the sound of the Foreign Legion Music.

=== Honoring the Legion Sous-Officiers ===
Military parades of the Foreign Legion are headed and opened by this section to maintain the tradition of sapeurs opening and clearing the way (French: ouvrant la route), always at the front, amongst worth and honor. Such is the custom of honoring the Legion Sous-officiers (Majors, Legion Chief Warrant Officers (French: Adjudant-chefs) and Warrant Officers (French: Adjudants)) since one of them always parades at the head of all Foreign Legion regimental parades of France.

== Uniform of Tradition ==
The Legion Pionniers distinguish themselves by their specific and unique dress uniform :

- Axe (French: Hache): serves to destroy obstacles of wood dressed by the enemy. At origin there were 6 kinds of axes to destroy and 7 kinds of axes to hammer.
- Leather Apron (French: Tablier de Cuir): Originally colored yellow with heritage to the 18th century and worn by the infantry sapeurs, the apron initially served the function to protect the sapeurs from wooden munitions blasts, breaching blasts and also limiting risks of penetration on obstacles in case of fall. The leather apron is of a tawny color and was officially adopted by the Legion in 1835.
- Gauntlet Gloves (French: Gants à Crispin): White Gauntlet Gloves served to protect the hands while destroying obstacles.
- Beard (French: Barbe): Since the pionniers were the first to mount combat assaults, their life expectancy was very minimal. Accordingly, from that principle, they reserved the right, when deploying to combat, to not shave and would come back bearded when they survived. The wearing of the beard became mandatory in the French Foreign Legion in 1844.
- Pionniers Insignia (French: l'insigne de manche): Worn below the rank insignia on the right arm. The insignia represents two crossed axes, emblem of function of tradition. The lozenges (diamonds) vary in color and depend on ranks:
  - Golden Axe on black background for Sous-officiers.
  - Golden Axe on black background bordered with gold for the Caporaux-Chefs.
  - Green Axe on black background bordered with green for the Caporaux and Legionnaires.

== Tradition ==
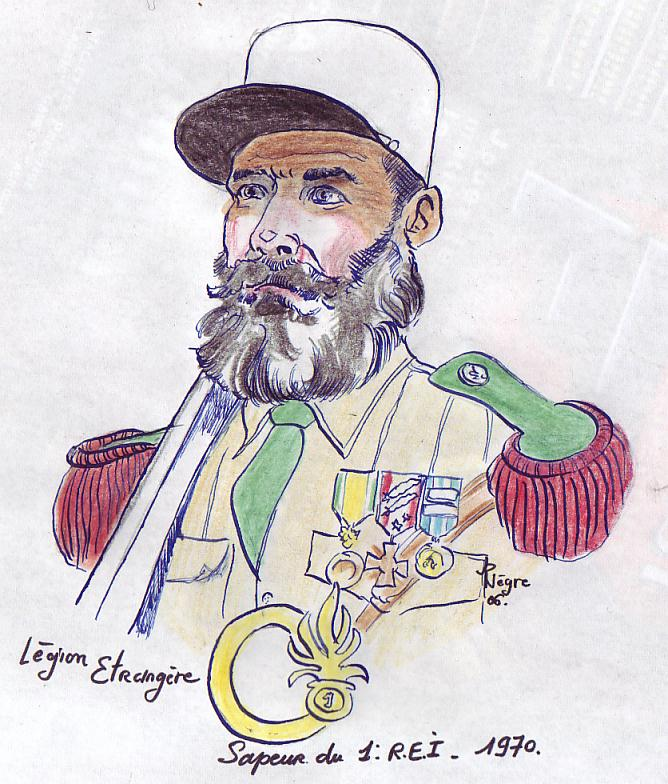
A Pionniers Sapeurs of the 1st Foreign Infantry Regiment 1^{er} REI during 1970 with Medaille Militaire, Croix de la Valeur Militaire (2 palms and 2 stars), Médaille d'Outre-Mer (2 agrafes-clasps).

=== Insignia ===
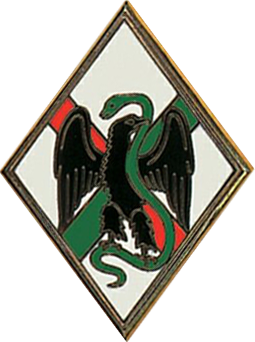
Regimental Insignia of the 1st Foreign Regiment, 1^{e} R.E.

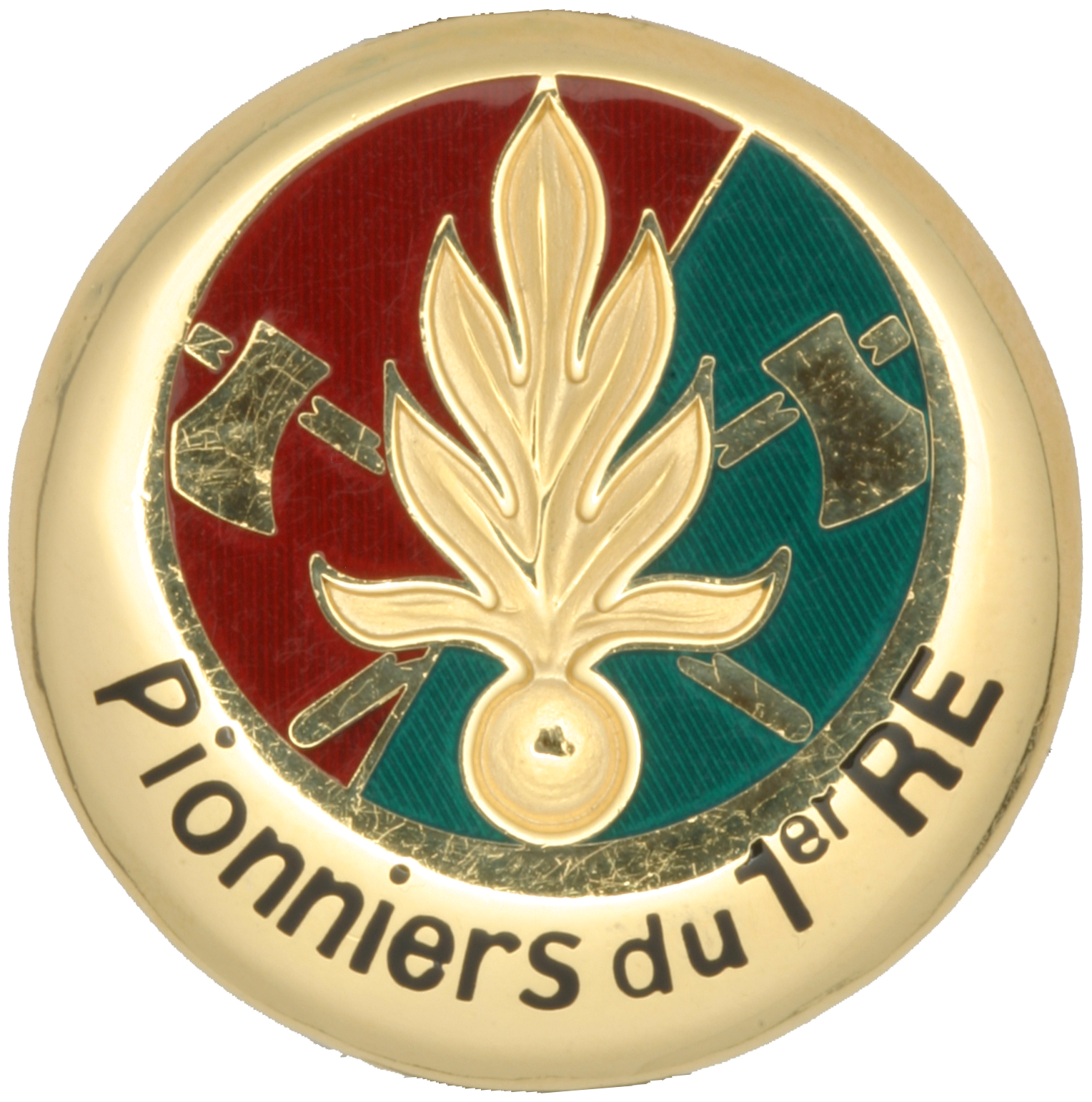
Pionniers of the 1st Foreign Regiment

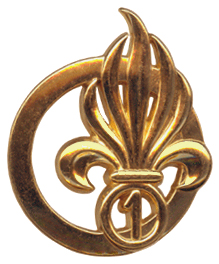
Insignia of the 1st Foreign Regiment

=== Regimental Colors ===
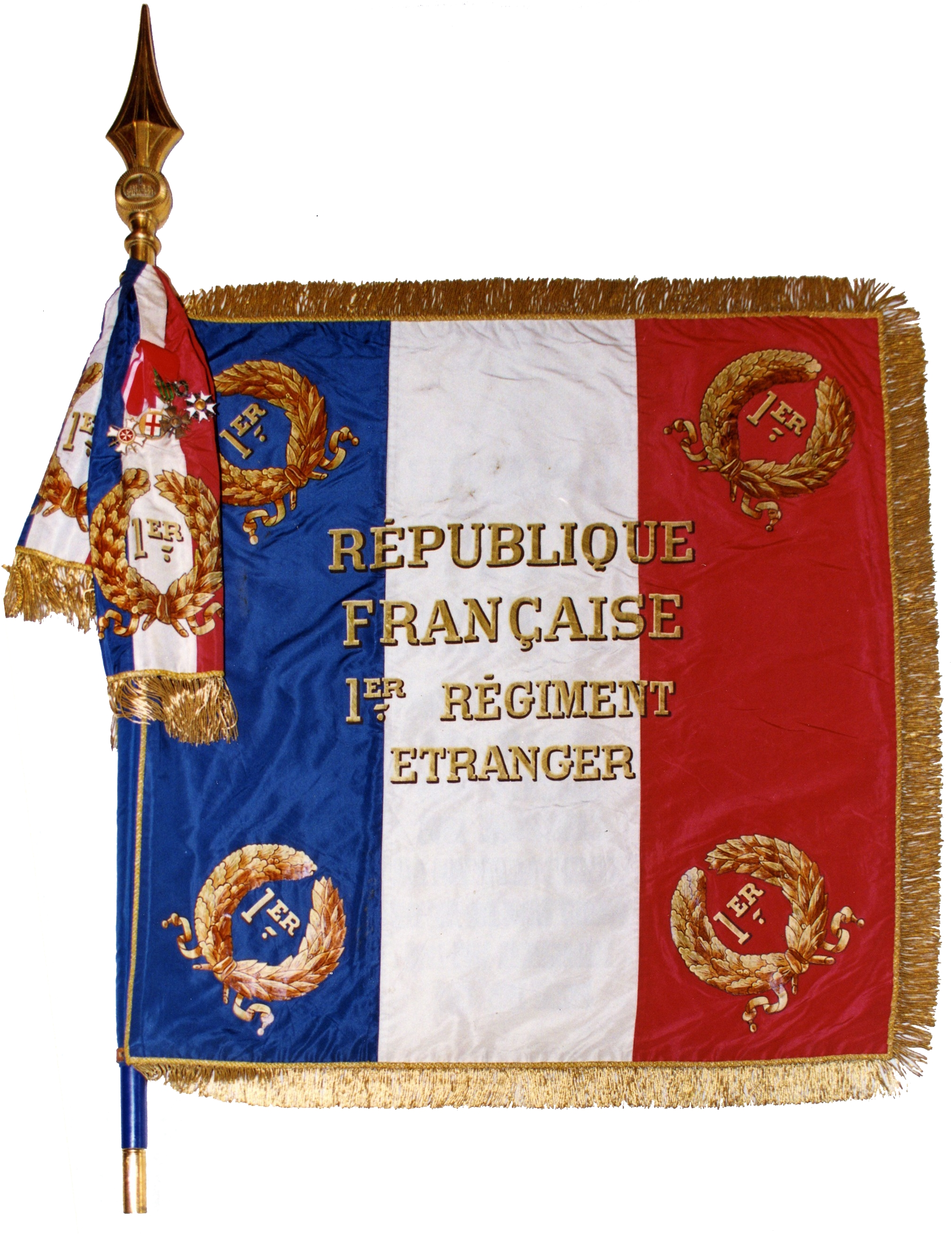
Regimental Colors of the 1st Foreign Regiment, 1^{e} R.E

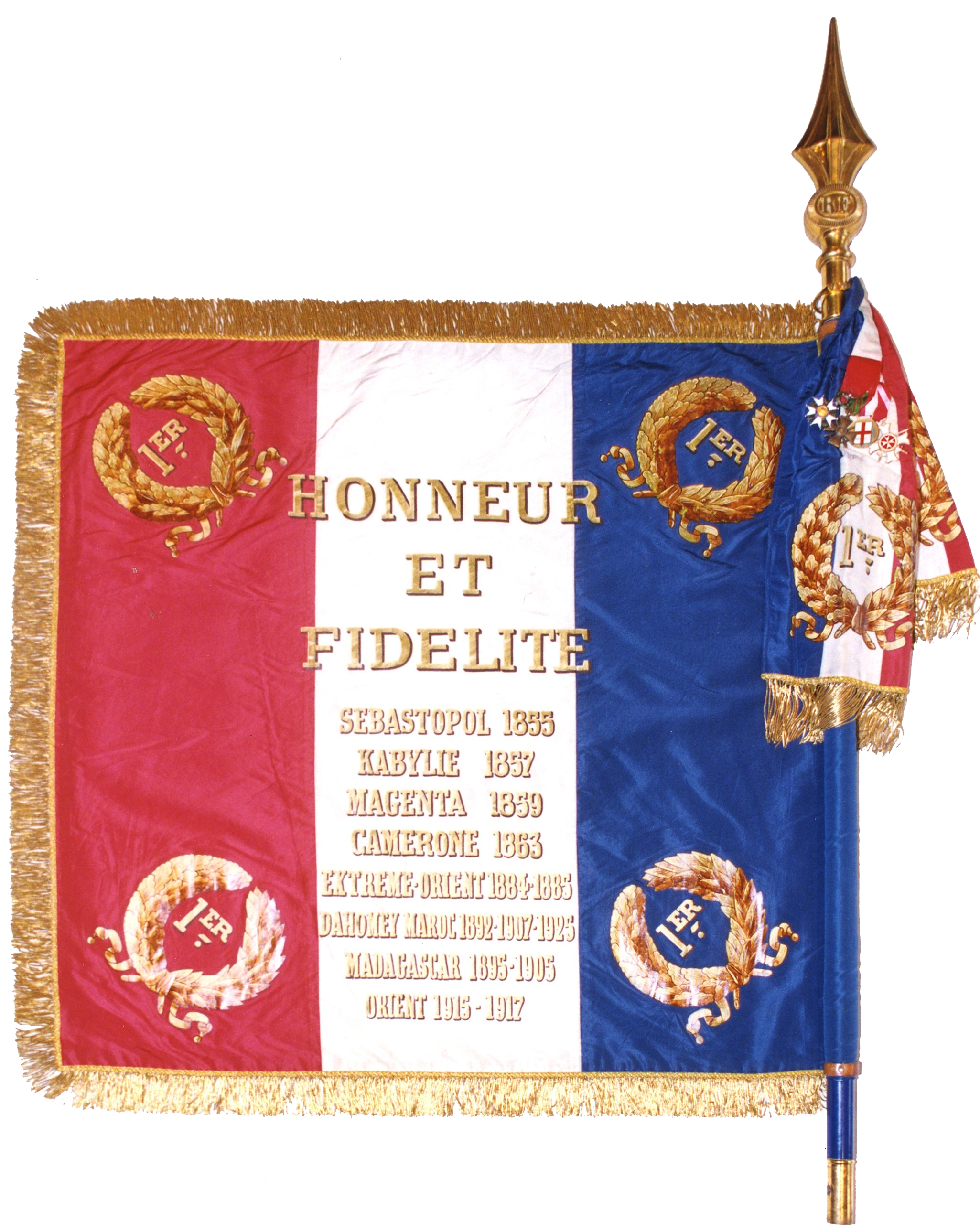
Verso Colors of the 1st Foreign Regiment, 1^{e} R.E with Honneur et Fidélité.

=== Regimental Song ===
Chant de Marche : Nous sommes tous des volontaires featuring:

Nous sommes tous des volontaires,
Les gars du 1er étranger,
Notre devise est légendaire,
Honneur Fidélité - Fidélité,
Marchons légionnaires,
Dans la boue, dans le sable brûlant, (bis)
Marchons l'âme légère, (bis)
Et le cœur vaillant, (bis)
Marchons légionnaires. (bis)

Nous marchons gaiement en cadence,
Malgré le vent malgré la pluie,
Les meilleurs soldats de la France,
Sont là devant vous, les voici.

Partout où le combat fait rage,
L'on voit le 1er étranger,
Exemple d'héroïsme, de courage,
Se couvrir de glorieux lauriers.

Gardons dans le fond de nos âmes,
Le souvenir de nos aînés,
Et pour la grenade à sept flammes,
Loyal prêt à tout sacrifier.

=== Decorations ===
- Legion of Honour on April 28, 1906
- Croix de guerre 1939–1945 (France) with 1 palm
- Gold Medal of the City of Milan since March 9, 1909
- Cross with swords of the Sovereign Military Order of Malta
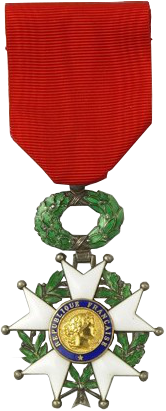
Legion of Honour

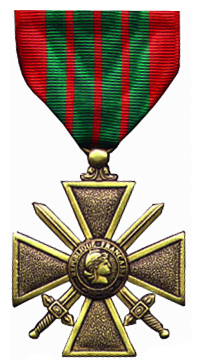
Croix de guerre 1939-1945 with 1 palm

Gold Medal of the City of Milan

=== Honors ===
==== Battle honours ====
- Sevastopol 1855
- Kabilie 1857
- Magenta 1859
- Camerone 1863
- Extrême-Orient 1884–1885
- Dahomy-Maroc 1892–1907–1925
- Madagascar 1895–1905
- Orient 1915–17
- AFN 1952–1962

== Gallery ==
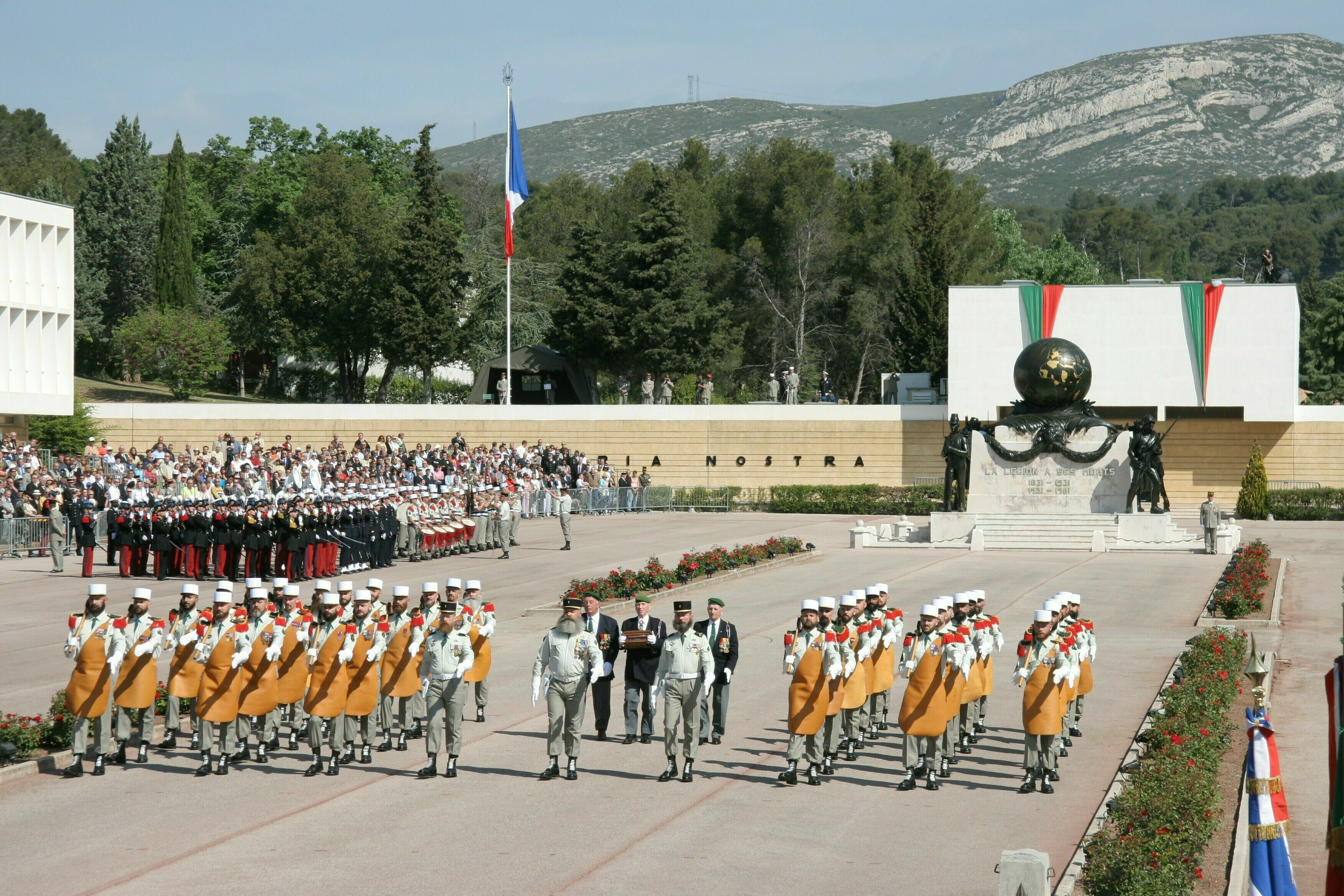
Each year, the Foreign Legion commemorates and celebrates Camarón in its headquarters in Aubagne and Bastille Day military parade in Paris; featuring the Pionniers leading and opening the way and marching to the sound of the Music. Veterans follow behind with Captaine Danjou's hand.

== See also ==
- French Foreign Legion Veteran Societies Federation (Légion étrangère)
