= Francisco de Paula Milán =

Mexican military personnel (1821–1883)

Francisco de Paula Milan Francisco de Paula Milán
- Francisco de Paula Milán
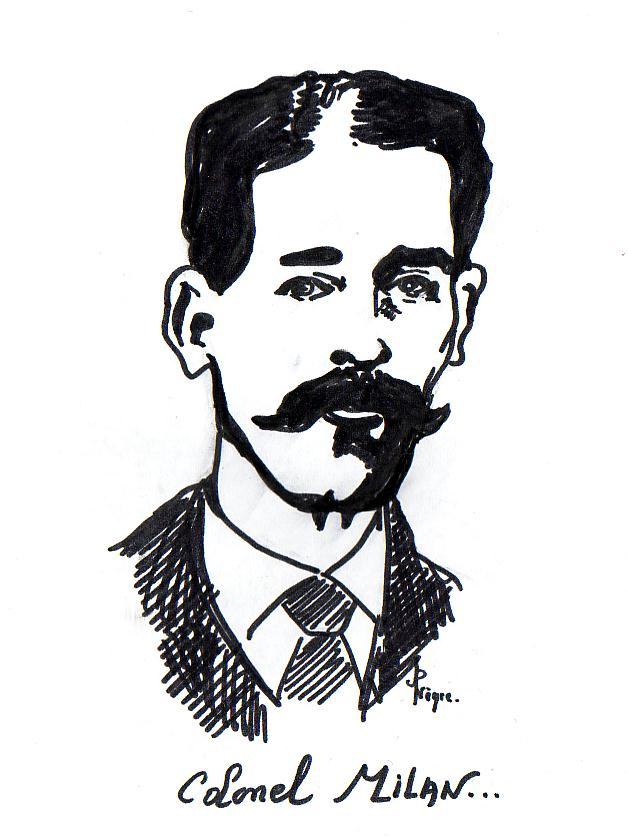
- Born: January 1, 1821; Xalapa, Veracruz
- Died: May 8, 1883 (aged 62); Xalapa, Veracruz
- Military career
- Allegiance: Mexico
- Branch: Army
- Rank: Colonel

Francisco de Paula Milán (January 1, 1821 – May 8, 1883 in Xalapa, Veracruz) was an officer of the Mexican Army from the Liberals group, that fought in the service of Benito Juárez.

== Biography ==
Milán completed law school at the University of Puebla. He joined the National Guard in 1847 and was involved in the defence of the ports of Veracruz and other actions against the American invasion, for which he went to prison twice.

He fought in the Mexican Reform War (1857-1861) against the Conservatives and in the setting of the French intervention in Mexico.

In 1862 he had the Greatest Mexican Victory with his contributation to the battle of May 5 (Fortress Puebla). After that, he was notified that he was the new commander of Veracruz. With his command over a small army he ambushed and eliminated a small division belonging to the French Foreign Legion on April 30, 1863. Due to this, Milán commanded: 1200 soldiers from the Army battalion and 600 men from the Cavalry-Support Troops. These formed three Infantry Battalions which each had 400 men and those who were from Córdoba under the command of Colonel Dr. Francisco Talavera, those from Xalapa were under the command of Colonel Ismael Terán and those from Veracruz were under the command of Colonel Rafael Estrada.

According to the official biography, Milán was governor of the state of Veracruz in 1866.

After the retreat of the French troops from Mexico in 1867, Milán supported the Archduke Maximillian Habsburg by sieging and occupying the ports of Veracruz.

After the victory of the republic, Milán devoted himself to a new trade. He composed the opera La Amiga de las Niñas.

== See also ==
- Battle of Camarón

== Literature ==
- Jean Brunon: Camerone. Edition Socomer, Paris 1988.
- Pierre Nord (Text), Guy Sabras (Illustrationen): Pages de gloire. Sidi-Brahim, Camerone, Bir-Hakim. Edition G.P., Paris 1945.
- Max Patay: Camerone. Edition France-Empire, Paris 1981.
- Colin Rickards: The hand of Capitain Danjou. Camerone and the French Foreign Legion in Mexico; 30. April 1860. Crowood Press, Ramsbury 2005, ISBN 1-86126-587-5.
- James W. Ryan: Camerone. The French Foreign Legion’s greatest Battle. Praeger, London 1996, ISBN 0-275-95490-0.
- Louis Gaulthier und Charles Jacquot: C’est la Légion. Edition Sofradif, Montreuil-sous-Bois 1972.
- Horst Ohligschläger (Verantw.): „Camerone“. In: Geschichte, hrsg. v. Johann Michael Sailer Verlag GmbH & Co. KG, Nürnberg 2003, S. 17–20, ISSN 1617-9412.
- Matthias Blazek: „Großes Vorbild der Légion étrangère: Die Schlacht von Camerone wurde vor 150 Jahren in Mexiko ausgetragen“. In: Kameradschaftliches aus Fontainebleau – Mitteilungsblatt des Freundeskreises Deutscher Militärischer Bevollmächtigter in Frankreich, Nr. 40, Juni 2013, Adelheidsdorf/Harsewinkel 2013, S. 21–23.
- Konrad Ratz: Maximilian und Juárez. Bd. 1: Das Zweite mexikanische Kaiserreich und die Republik – Hintergründe, Dokumente und Augenzeugenberichte, Akademische Druck- und Verlagsanstalt, Graz 1998, S. 119.
