= Battle of Camarón =

Last-stand battle during the second French intervention in Mexico

Coordinates: 19°01′00″N 96°37′00″W

- Part of the second French intervention in Mexico
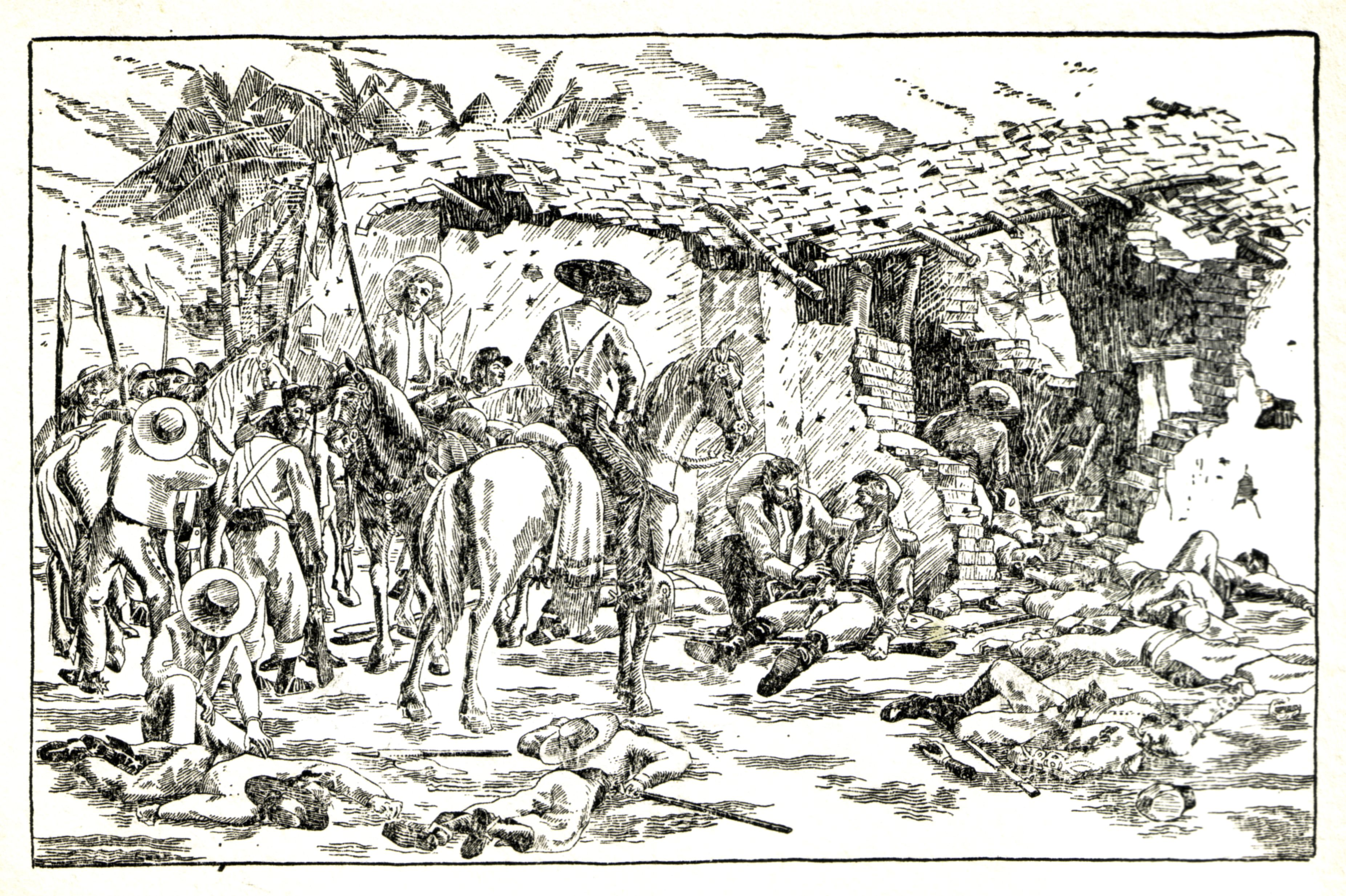
- Du combat le Camerone, Unknown author
Date	30 April 1863
Location	Camarón de Tejeda, Veracruz, Mexico
Result	Mexican victory

Belligerents
Mexico	France

Commanders and leaders
Francisco Milán	Jean Danjou †

Strength
3,300	65

Casualties and losses
300 killed 500 wounded	41 killed 17 wounded 24 captured

The Battle of Camarón (French: Bataille de Camerone) was a last stand engagement fought on 30 April 1863 between the French Foreign Legion and the Mexican Army, during the Second French intervention in Mexico (1861–1867). A small French detachment of 65 men, led by Captain Jean Danjou, was escorting a supply convoy when it was surrounded near the village of Camarón de Tejeda in Veracruz by a force of around 2,000 Mexican troops. Refusing repeated calls to surrender, the legionnaires made a determined defensive stand at the Hacienda Camarón, holding out for nearly eleven hours until they were either killed, wounded, or captured.

Although a tactical defeat, the action became a celebrated episode in French military history. The disproportionate resistance, which resulted in over 800 Mexican casualties, was regarded in France as a moral victory and a symbol of discipline, sacrifice, and esprit de corps. Danjou, who was killed in action, became an enduring symbol of the Legion's values, and his wooden prosthetic hand is now its most venerated relic.

The battle had no decisive effect on the outcome of the campaign, which ended in French withdrawal a few years later, but it came to define the identity of the French Foreign Legion. After the Franco-Prussian War, the tradition of Camarón was embraced as a founding myth of the Legion. Since 1906, the Legion has commemorated the date annually with military ceremonies at its headquarters, led by the Pioneers, its elite ceremonial unit. In Mexico, the battle is formally commemorated in Camarón de Tejeda, where annual ceremonies honour both Mexican and French soldiers who died in the fighting.

== Background ==
As part of the second French intervention in Mexico, a French army commanded by the General Forey was besieging the Mexican city of Puebla. The Legion's 1st and 2nd Battalions, under the command of Col. Pierre Jeanningros, had arrived in Veracruz on 26 March. The 2nd Battalion, under the command of Maj. Munier, was assigned to protect the road from Tejeria to Soledad, while the 1st Battalion protected the road onwards to Chiquihuite.

In support of the siege, the French sent a convoy, under the command of Capt. Jacques Cabossel, with 3 million francs in gold bullion, siege guns, and sixty wagons of ammunition. Two companies of fusiliers were to escort the convoy from La Soledad to Chiquihuite. However, Jeanningros sent the 3rd company of the 1st Battalion to reinforce the convoy guard when Indian spies told him the Mexicans would ambush the convoy. As the company had no officers, Captain Jean Danjou, adjutant major of the 1st Battalion, volunteered to command. Sous-Lieutenants (2nd Lts.) Napoleon Vilain and Clement Maudet soon volunteered to join him.

Six miles northeast of Camarón, was La Joya, headquarters of Col. Francisco de Paula Milán's Center Brigade, consisting of National Guard troops from Cordoba, Xalapa, Coscomatepec de Bravo and Veracruz, plus dragoons and lancers.

== The battle ==
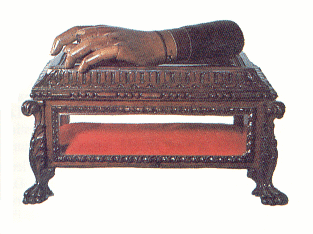
Captain Danjou's prosthetic hand is now the Legion's most venerated relic

On 30 April, at 1:00 a.m., the 3rd company of 62 Legionnaires and three Legion officers were en route from Chiquihuite for Palo Verde, 6 hours and 22 miles away. At 5:45 a.m., they reached Camerone and the La Trinidad Hacienda, its 50-meter long walls forming a square, enclosing a two-story ranch house on the north and an open stable on the south, long ago abandoned.

They reached Palo Verde as planned by 7:00 a.m., and proceeded to prepare their morning coffee. Coffee was interrupted by the sighting around 8:00 a.m. of Mexican cavalry, Capt. Tomas Algonzanas' Cotaxtla Squadron of 250 rancheros, to the north heading to the southeast, but they continued southward, passing the road a half-mile away. Seeking a more defensible position, Danjou moved his men back west, along the forest north of the road, to the hacienda's ten-foot walls. Milán, meanwhile, decided that he must eliminate Danjou's men before they could discover the size of Milán's forces and their planned ambush of the convoy. Milán sent his dragoon squadron and four infantry battalions to join Algonzana's lancers. Danjou's plan was to draw the Mexican forces away from the convoy. The Legionnaires reached the hacienda by 09:00.

Danjou decided to proceed west on the road towards Paseo del Macho but had proceeded only a short distance before discovering Algonzana's cavalrymen north of the road, and Danjou ordered his men to form a hollow square. Charging in two columns, the Mexicans "were stopped short" by salvos and then withdrew, allowing the 3rd to withdraw to the cactus-filled ditch on the south side of the road and make their way back to the hacienda. However, on the way, sixteen of Danjou's men were captured, and Danjou faced another Mexican cavalry charge sweeping around the south side of the hacienda. The second charge was again met by rifle fire from Danjou's square, forcing the Mexicans to ride away. Upon reaching the hacienda, the Legionnaires were surprised to discover Mexicans occupying the ranch house.

Milán arrived with the dragoons at about the same time the bullion convoy headed back to La Soledad, after being warned of the 3rd's difficulties. Seeing that he was totally surrounded, Capt. Danjou "urged his men to take an oath to fight to the death rather than surrender... he made them swear their fealty on his wooden hand. Danjou then shared his bottle of wine and encouraged his men with "those noble words that warm one's heart and makes the final sacrifice less difficult to face."

Milán sent Capt. Ramon Laine to negotiate a surrender, who explained to Danjou, "you will be needlessly slaughtered." Danjou replied that he "had plenty of ammunition and shall continue to fight." At about 11:00, the Mexicans charged the gateways on the west end of the hacienda, and the breach on the south. Though the attack was held off, Danjou was hit in the chest and soon died. Lieutenant Vilain assumed command. Casualties mounted on both sides, but among the Legionnaires, "water and food, the two most required necessities, were not to be found. Thirst, heat exhaustion, and sunstroke had replaced them." Their mules had run off after the first encounter with the Mexican cavalry, and then Col. Milán's Center Brigade infantry, 1200–1400 men, arrived at the hacienda. When Capt. Laine offered the legionnaires a second chance to surrender, Sergeant Vincent Morzycki responded in the spirit of Pierre Cambronne, with "Merde." After four hours of fighting, thirty-two Legionnaires remained fighting. By 14:00, only twenty could still fight. At 14:30, Lt. Vilain was struck dead and Lieutenant Maudet took command.

By 17:00, the roof of the ranch house had been burned away, the Legionnaires were down to twelve men, and Col. Milan ordered his men out of the hacienda, and offered the Legionnaires a third chance to surrender. In the next onslaught, Corporals Everiste Burg, Karl Magnin and Heinrich Pinzinger, plus fusiliers Leon Gorski and Hippolyte Kunnasseg were captured. By 17:30, only Lt. Maudet's men remained in the stable.

By 18:00, with ammunition exhausted, the last of Danjou's men, numbering only five, including Lt. Maudet, desperately mounted a bayonet charge. Two men fell outright, and the rest were surrounded. One of them, Victor Catteau, had leapt in front of Maudet in an effort to protect him, and died in the Mexican barrage. Major Campos ordered the Legionnaires to surrender to which Corporal Phillipe Maine answered, "We will surrender if you leave us our weapons and our equipment. You also have to promise to take care of our wounded lieutenant."

When Campos brought the trio to Milán, he asked, "Is this all of them? Is this all of the men who are left?" Then, in amazement, he exclaimed, "These are not men! They are demons!"

== Aftermath ==
As promised, Lt. Maudet was treated on the battlefield by Dr. Francisco Talavera, also the major commanding the Cordoba unit, before succumbing to his wounds on 8 May. Drummer Lai was left for dead, but found by Jeanningros on 1 May. Seventeen legionnaires were taken prisoner to La Joya. Most were freed in a prisoner exchange on 14 July 1863.

== Legacy ==
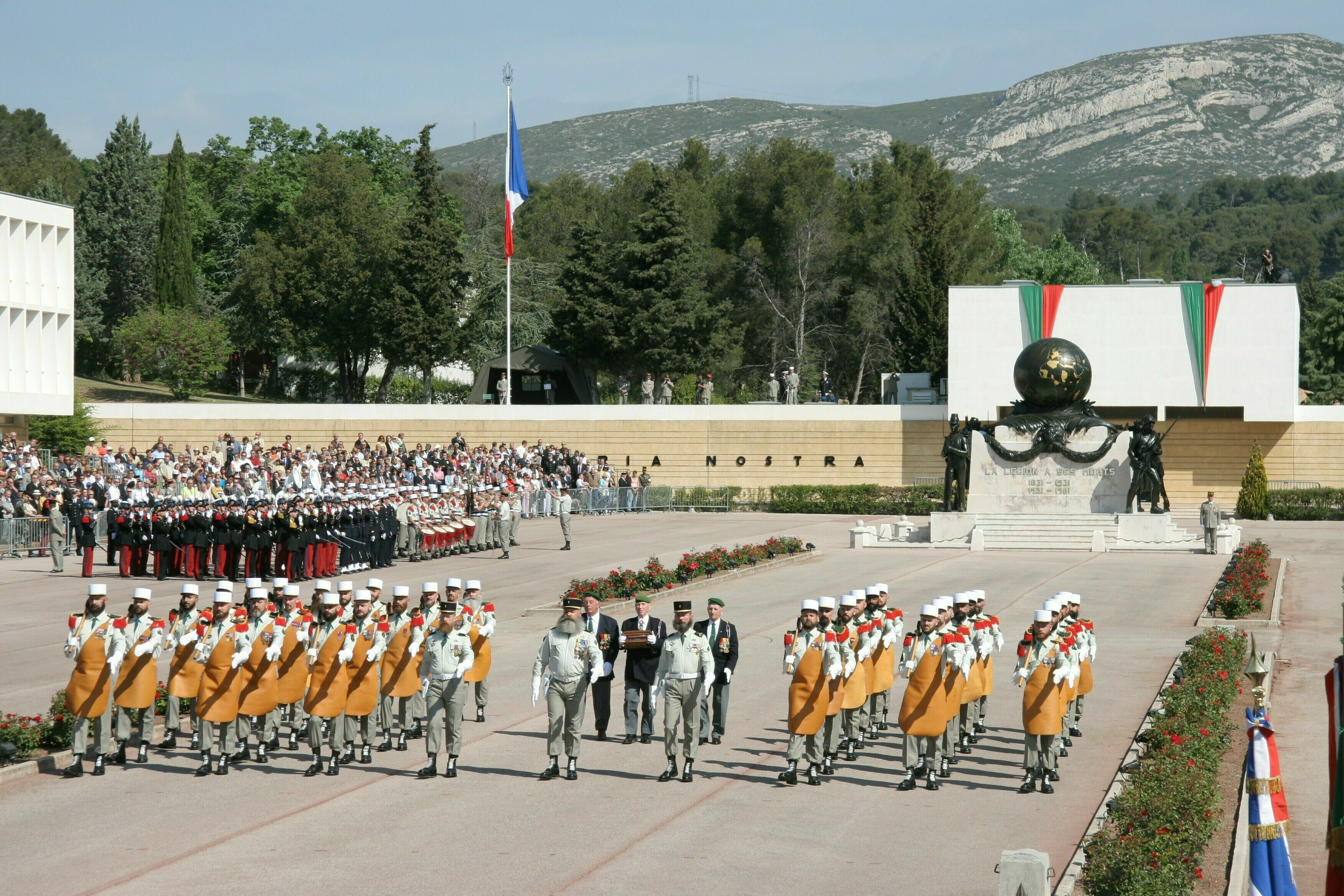
Each year, the French Foreign Legion commemorates and celebrates Camarón in its headquarters in Aubagne and Bastille Day military parade in Paris; featuring the Pionniers leading and opening the way.

When the Legion moved to France, Capitain Danjou's wooden hand was taken to Aubagne, where it remains in the Legion Museum of Memory. The hand is the most cherished artifact in Legion history and the prestige and honor granted to a Legionnaire to carry it on parade in its protective case is among the greatest bestowed on a Legionnaire.

30 April is celebrated as "Camerone Day," an important day for the Legionnaires, when the wooden prosthetic hand of Capitain Danjou is brought out for display.

In 1892, a monument commemorating the battle was erected on the battlefield containing a plaque with the following inscription in latin:

Quos hic non plus sexaginta
adversi totius agminis
Moles constravit
Vita prius quam virtus
milites deservit gallicos
Die XXX mensis apr.
anni MDCCCLXIII

(English: "Here no more than sixty opposed a whole army. The mass overwhelmed them. Life earlier than courage abandoned the French soldiers. The 30th day of April, year 1863.)

The monument later fell into disrepair, and was replaced by a new one in 1963, with the following inscription in french:

Ils furent ici moins de soixante
opposés à toute une armée.
Sa masse les écrasa.
La vie plutôt que le courage
abandonna ces soldats Français
a Camerone le 30 avril 1863

(English: "Here were less than sixty opposing a whole army. The mass overwhelmed them. Life rather than courage abandoned these French soldiers at Camerone on 30 april 1863)

One the sides of the monument two further inscriptions are engraved. Below a bronze mexican eagle the spanish words "Homenaje a los combatentes de Cameron", and below a french imperial eagle the french words "Hommage aux combattants de Camerone"

The railing from the Legion grave at Camarone can now be found at the village of Puyloubier near Aix-en-Provence.

The site of the battle can be visited at the village of Camarón de Tejeda, in the state of Veracruz, Mexico. This village was formerly known as El Camarón, and later as Adalberto Tejeda, Villa Tejeda or Camarón de Tejeda.

In the village is a monument erected by the Mexican government in 1964, honoring the Mexican soldiers who fought in the battle. There is also a memorial site and parade ground on the outskirts of the village. The memorial has a raised platform, which covers the resting place of the remains of French and Mexican soldiers disinterred in the 1960s. The surface of the platform has a plaque in Latin. Diligent search of the area has failed to locate the plaque with the oft-quoted 1892 French-language inscription referred to above.

Every year, on 30 April, the Mexican government holds annual ceremonies at the memorial site, with political speakers and a parade of various Mexican military units. The village holds a fiesta on the same day. The ceremonies are sometimes attended by representatives of the French military, and the site is also visited by retired veterans of the French Foreign Legion. It is also tradition that any Mexican soldiers passing by the area turn towards the monument and offer a salute.

The village of Adalberto Tejeda (also known as Villa Tejeda, Camarón de Tejeda, or simply El Camarón) is located on secondary roads about 25 to 30 km west of the town of Soledad de Doblado, Veracruz, and about 64 km. west of the city of Veracruz. The 1964 monument is in the center of town. The memorial and parade ground, known as El Mausoleo (the Mausoleum), is a few blocks away on the edge of the village, near the town cemetery. The co-ordinates of the village of Adalberto Tejeda are lat. 19.0216, long. -96.6154.

"To this day, the battle of Camerone is hailed as an exemplary example of 'Fidelity to the Mission', which came to form the central myth of the Legion." The 1st Foreign Regiment has the Mexican eagle on its unit badge, and the "Camerone" battle streamer sits on top of their standard. The names of Danjou, Vilain and Maudet are on a plaque on the second-floor wall in the Court of Honor at Les Invalides.

The battle is the centre-piece of Ian Colquhoun's 2014 English-language historical novel Le Boudin – The Demons of Camerone.

== See also ==
- List of battles of the French intervention in Mexico
- A painting of the battle was made by Jean Adolphe Beauce
- List of last stands
- Battle of Thermopylae
- Battle of the Alamo
