= Honneur et Fidélité =

Motto of the Foreign Legion

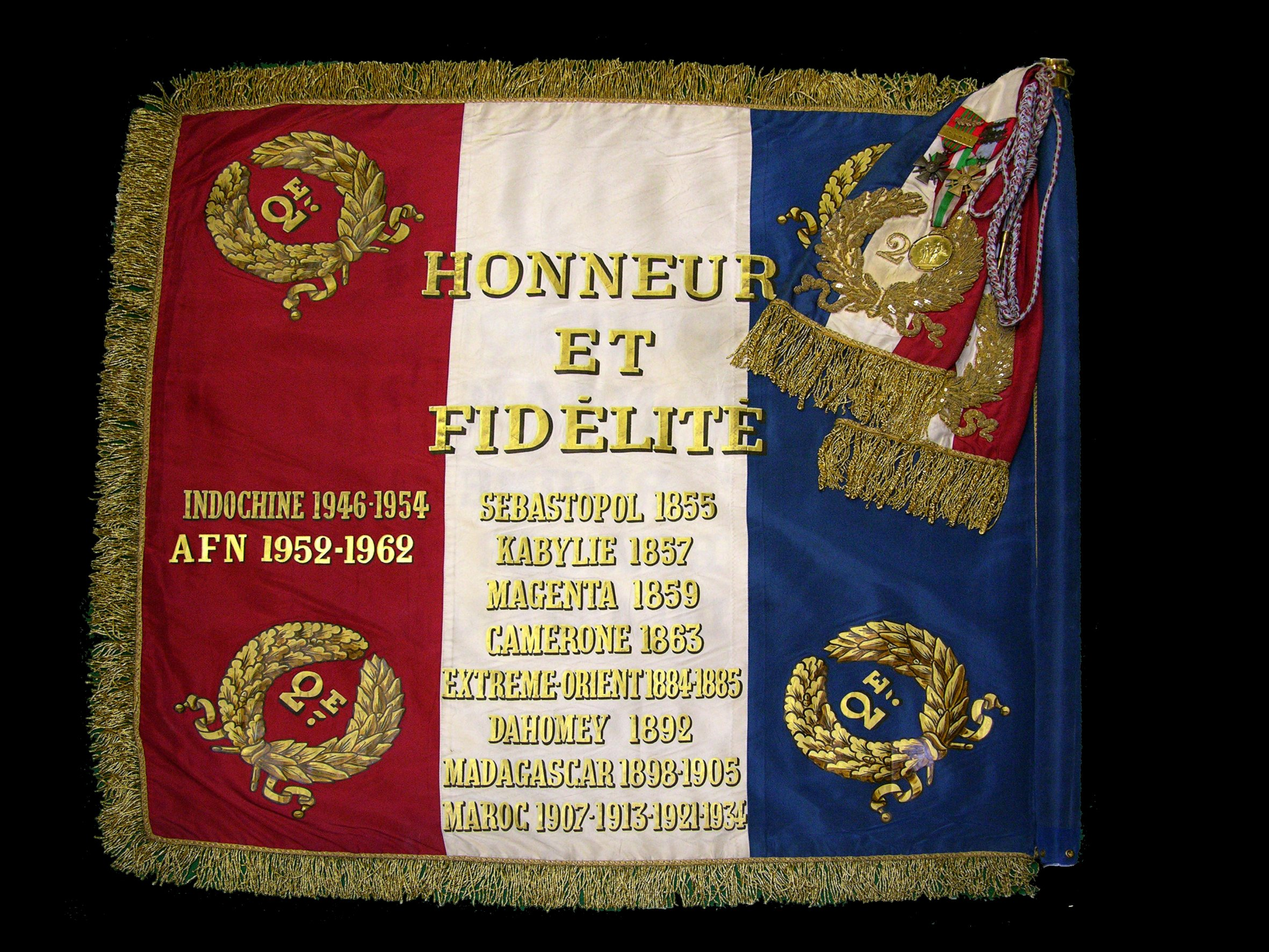
Honneur et Fidélité on the regimental colors of the 2nd Foreign Infantry Regiment.

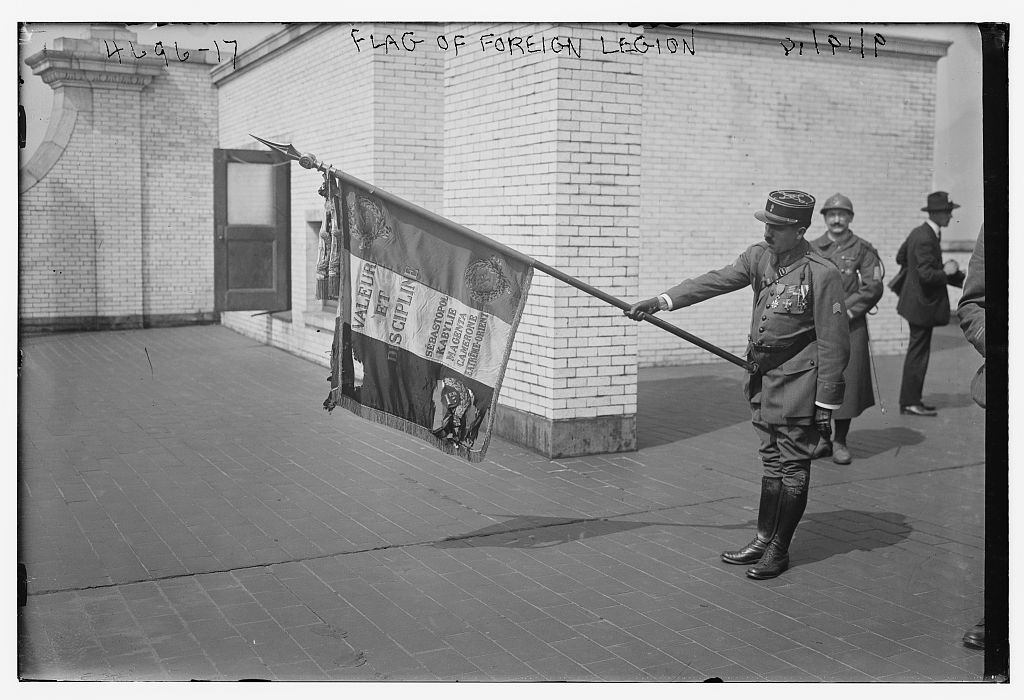
Honneur et Fidélité regimental colors in 1918

Honneur et Fidélité ("Honour and Fidelity") is the motto of the Foreign Legion in the French Armed Forces. It has been inscribed on Legion flags instead of the Honneur et Patrie (Honour and Fatherland) inscribed on flags of the regular French Army of the French Republic. Nevertheless, both mottos share a similar past.

== History ==
This motto of Honneur et Fidélité was the one written on the banners of Swiss Military units, notably the Swiss Line Infantry Regiments of the Kingdom of France during the Ancien Regime. Originally formed as the Régiment de Salis (French: Régiment de Salis) (Swiss regiment at the service of France; 12 companies of 170 men) in 1690, Régiment de Diesbach (French: Régiment de Diesbach), becoming then the 85th Line Infantry Regiment (French: 85e régiment d'infanterie) of the French Army in 1791. The 3rd Foreign Regiment ( before the creation of the Foreign Legion), throughout all the campaign battles of the Empire, would remain loyal to the motto of Swiss troops Honneur et Fidélité which would become that adopted by the Foreign Legion.

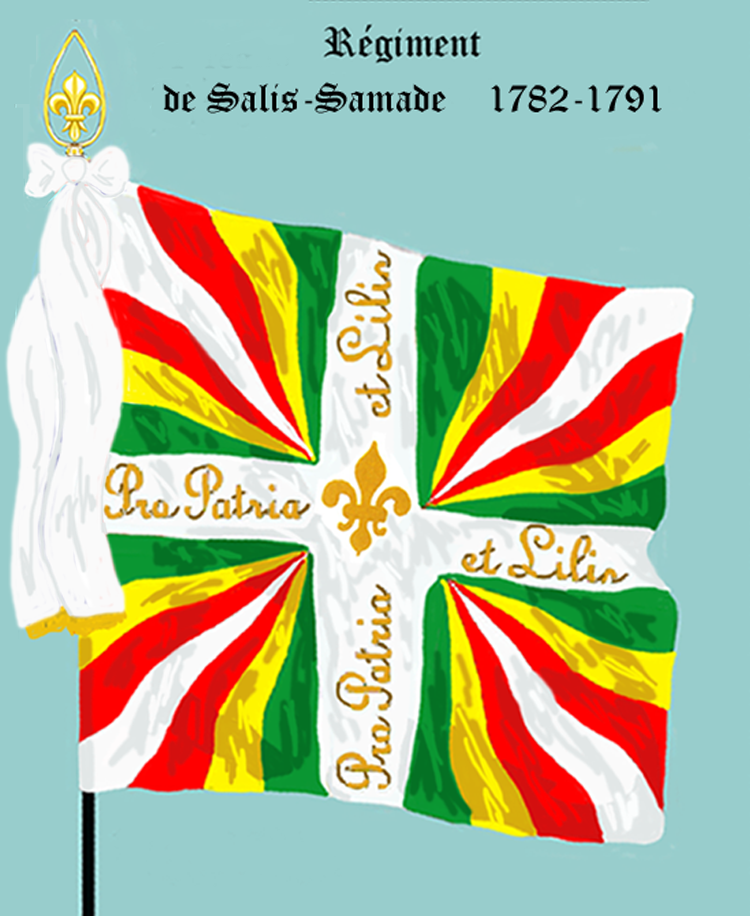
Regimental colors of the Régiment de Salis (1782)

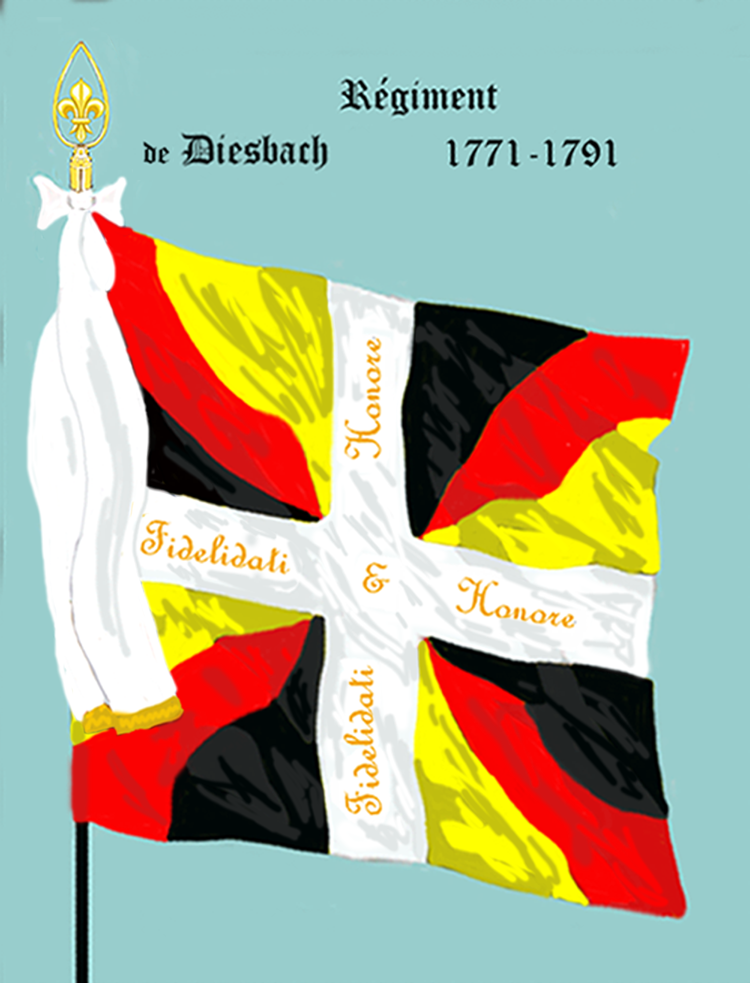
Fidelidati & Honore inscribed on the regimental color of the Régiment de Diesbach.

== Foreign Legion (1831–present) ==
=== Honneur et Fidélité & Legio Patria Nostra ===
Generally, mottos and creeds are chosen by a social organisation, a country, a dynasty to dictate a line of action or ideal. The French military mottos are old: the Musketeers had their own "one for all, all for one" (French: un pour tous, tous pour un), most of the foreign regiments in service of France during the Ancien Régime had chosen Nec pluribus impar, today the motto of the 1st Foreign Cavalry Regiment. These mottos were suppressed during the Revolution, when foreign regiments were dissolved and transformed to demi-brigades. First Consul Bonaparte chose for the Grande Armée the motto Valeur et Discipline ("Valour and Discipline"), which remained almost until August 1914, when General Joseph Gallieni had the inscription Honneur et Patrie ("Honour and Fatherland") written on all emblems; the motto was already featured on the verso of the regimental colours of the first flag of the Foreign Legion from 1831 to 1835, and from 1840 to 1844 following the cession of the Foreign Legion in Spain. In 1920, Honneur et Fidélité was inscribed on Legion regiments: this motto of the Swiss Regiment of Diesbach under the Ancien Régime was chosen to emphasise on one hand on the perennity of foreign soldiers at the service of France, and on the other the integrity of their service to their institution while serving a country that is not theirs. As a result, and mainly for those two reasons, Lieutenant-Colonel Paul-Frédéric Rollet, following World War I, vested his power to inscribe Honneur et Fidélité on the 3 Foreign Legion regimental flags. His vocation was received and approved by the minister, and the decree of 1920 precised that "Regimental Colours of the Foreign Legion, in existence or created in the future, will carry the motto Honneur et Fidélité".

=== Alsace-Lorraine ===
The mottos Honneur et Fidélité ("Honour and Fidelity") and Legio Patria Nostra (The Legion is our Fatherland) are the crucible identity of the Foreign Legion. It is not known exactly when and how was born and adopted the motto Legio Patria Nostra. It is possible that it could be approached to the concept of the Legion as a "go to place" which surfaced following 1871, when the Legion welcomed a great deal of those from Alsace and Lorraine, whom became stateless due to the annexation of their regions by Germany. On this subject, René Doumic, perpetual secretary of the French academy, cited in 1926 by General Rollet in the preface of the book of Jean Martin Légionnaire, stated:

Let us not forget that from 1870 to 1914, the Legion was the "go to place" for those who kept a heart fealt love for the lost Fatherland. Right now, thankfully, the Alsaciens and the Lorraines need not come to the Legion to serve France, but what a proud bunch of Legionnaires they must have been.

It is thus strongly probable that the question of the Alsace-Lorraine was the origin of this motto, as well as the mass income of foreign volunteers during the World War I.In fact, on 29 July 1914, intellectual foreign nationals launched a support calling to their adopting fatherland:

Foreign friends of France, for whom their stay in France taught to appreciate this nation like their second nation; feel the imperial need to offer their arms. Intellectuals, students, workers and all able men, born abroad, locally, we who have found the nurturing material, let us group link in a solid chain vested in the service of France.

Blaise Cendrars was one of these intellectuals who went to serve in the Legion. This calling grabbed success: "it is reported that 5 days following this calling, in one day only on August 3, 8000 foreign nationals volunteered at the recruiting doors!".

=== Adjudant-Chef Mader ===
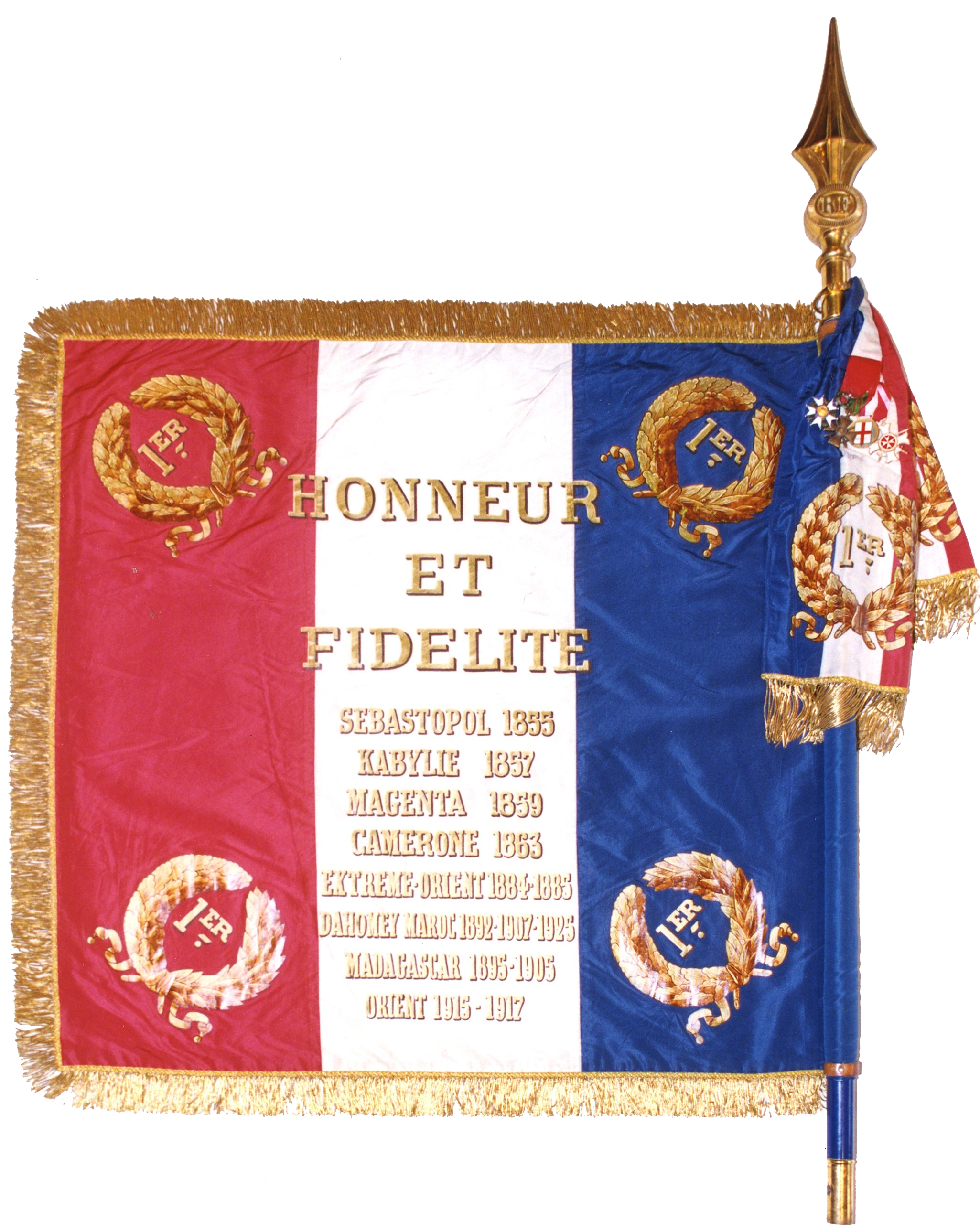
Verso Colours of the 1st Foreign Regiment, 1^{e} R.E with "Honneur et Fidélité".

Sometimes, it is also tendered that the motto of Legio Patria Nostra (The Legion is our Fatherland) was originally warranted to Sous-Lieutenant Max-Emmanuel Mader, known as Adjudant-chef Mader. Originally German, disappointed by his army, he volunteered in the Foreign Legion in 1908 and fought in Morocco; he was awarded the rank of commander of the Legion of Honour, the Médaille militaire, and was mentioned in dispatches 9 times during World War I, including 3 times at the level of the entire military forces, before he lost his left arm in July 1918 and was discharged. Returning to Strasbourg as guardian of the Rhin Palace, he witnessed the period of the reoccupation of Alsace-Lorraine while pretending to be a deaf-mute. Mader was the symbol of legionnaires whose fidelity would carry his attachment to his fatherland. The belonging to the fatherland "Legio", does not oblige in any case the repudiation of the original country which the legion respects: the legionnaire is perfectly free of will to keep his nationality, and the legion requests the consent of every legionnaire before sending them to fight in their country of origin.

Today, the legionnaire remains a "volunteer serving France with Honneur et Fidélité" and the Legion is their fatherland. General Aimable Pélissier, superior commandant of the Province of Oran reminds in June 1854 at the 1st Foreign Regiment which was making way to the Crimean War after having constructed Sidi Bel Abbès: "Remember, while following the road of honour, that there is no more beautiful title in the world than that of French soldier, and that these noble fanions floating at the tip of your bayonets are unfortunately your fatherland."

== See also ==
- Foreign Legion Pioneers (Pionniers)
- History of the French Navy
- French Navy
- Troupes de la marine
- Foreign Legion Recruiting Group
- Swiss Guard
- Malgré-nous
- Honneur, patrie, valeur, discipline
- Semper Fidelis
