= École Militaire =

Military facility southeast of the Champ de Mars, Paris

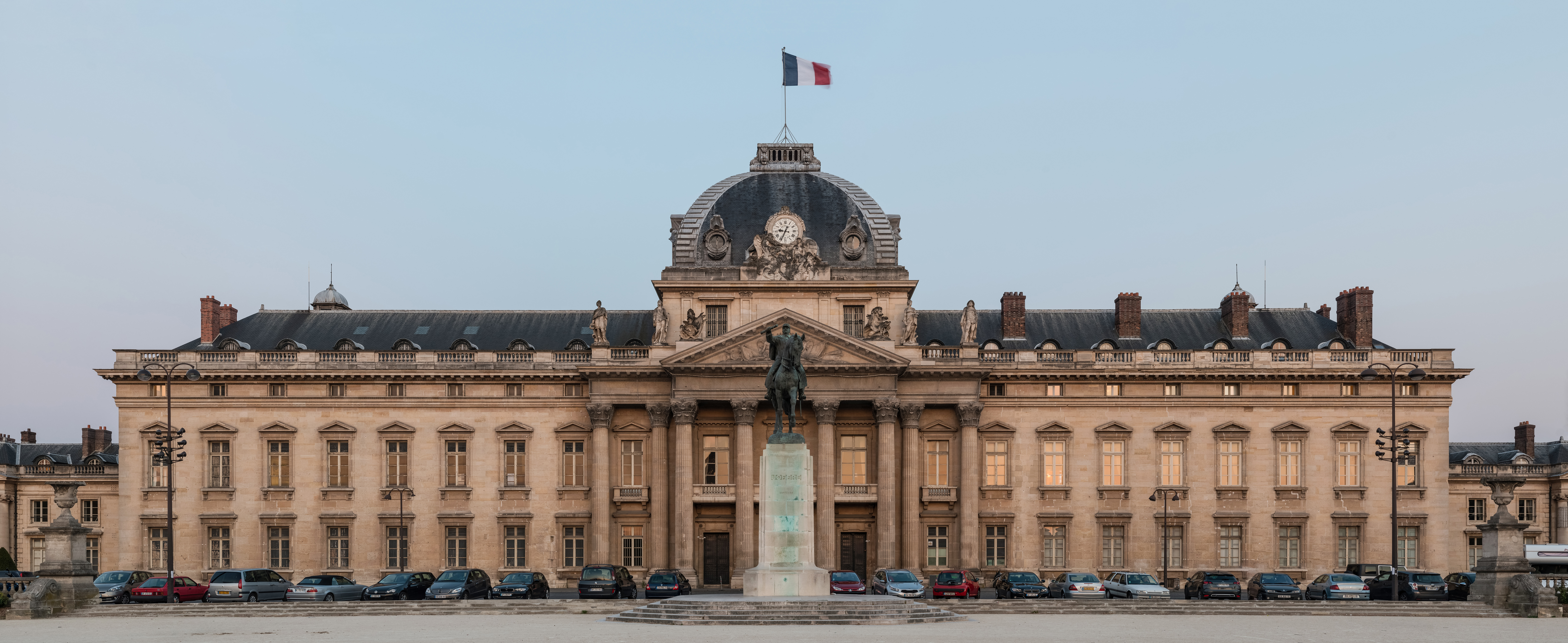
- Central École militaire building

General information
- Type: Educational building complex, military academy
- Location: 1 Place de Joffre, 75007, Paris, Île-de-France, France
- Coordinates: 48°51′09″N 2°18′13″E
- Current tenants: Military academy
- Completed: 1751; 275 years ago

Design and construction
- Architect: Ange-Jacques Gabriel

Website
- geostrategia.fr

The École Militaire (French: [ekɔl militɛːʁ]; lit. 'military school') is a complex of buildings in Paris, France, which house various military training facilities. It was founded in 1751 by King Louis XV and is located in the 7th arrondissement of Paris, southeast of the Champ de Mars.The building, constructed by Ange-Jacques Gabriel, has continuously housed various military schools and institutions and is now home to two staff colleges for senior French Armed Forces officers and a military research institute. It has been classified as a national monument since 1990. This site can be visited during the European Heritage Days.

== History ==
=== Origins of the institution ===
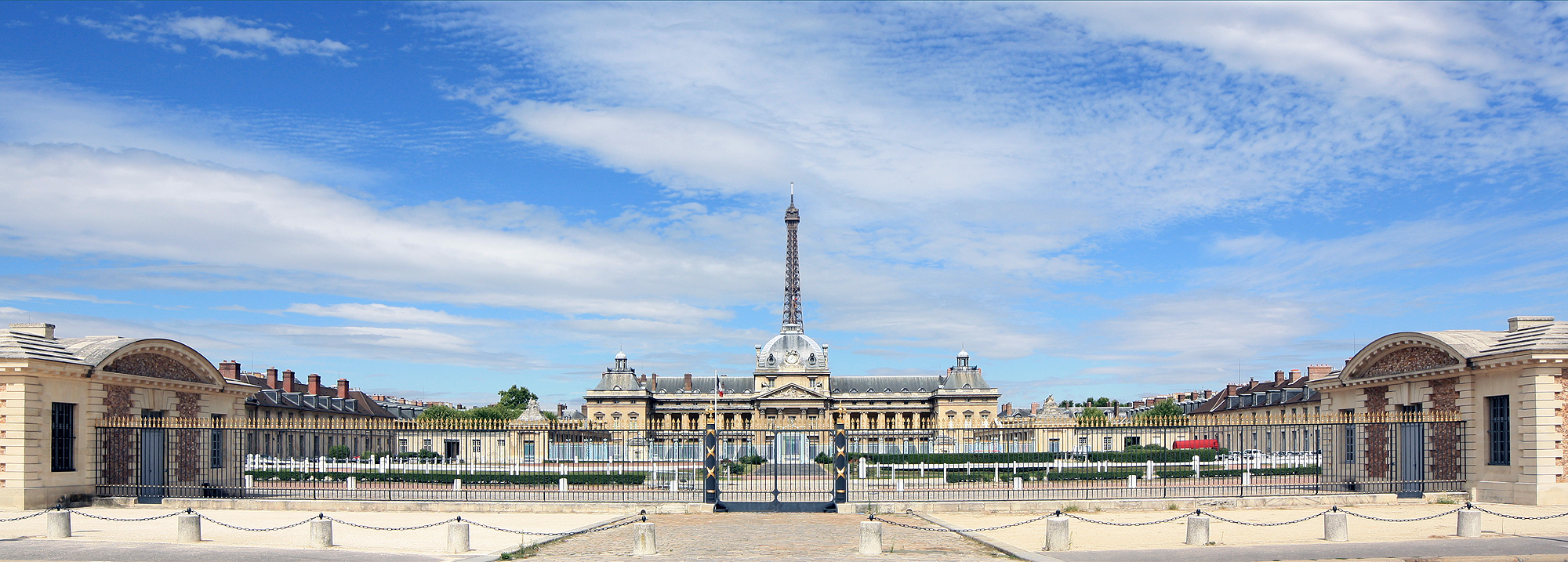
The École Militaire from the Place de Fontenoy

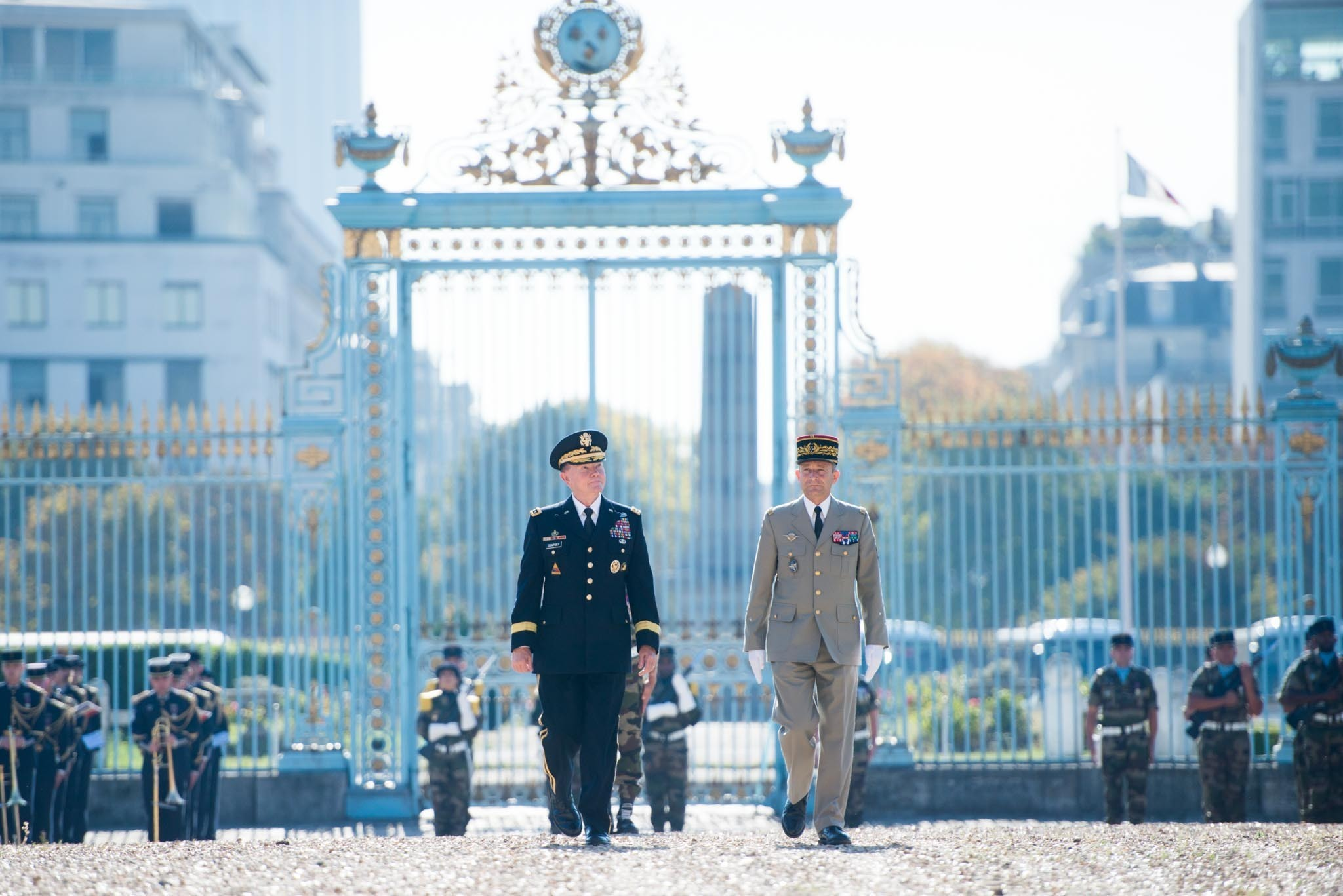
General Pierre de Villiers welcomes US General Martin E. Dempsey at the École Militaire, 2014

The École Militaire was founded in 1750, after the War of the Austrian Succession, by Louis XV on the basis of a proposal of Marshal Maurice de Saxe and with the support of Madame de Pompadour and financier Joseph Paris Duverney.

Previously, military academies were exclusive to children of a noble background and offered apprenticeships in the King's Stables or the stables of other royal members. With the aim of creating an academic college for cadet officers from poor noble families, the exclusivity that royal military academies held vanished.

By the edict of January 1751, King Louis XV established the institution to provide education to five hundred young noblemen born without fortune. Article XI of the edict provides for "by way of first perpetual endowment" the tax on playing cards. The administration is entrusted to the Secretary of State for War. The Royal Military Academy included a number of military colleges in the province such as the School of Brienne where students were admitted on evidence of nobility. At the end of their schooling, admission to the Royal Military School in Paris was done through a national competition.

=== Architecture and Ange-Jacques Gabriel ===
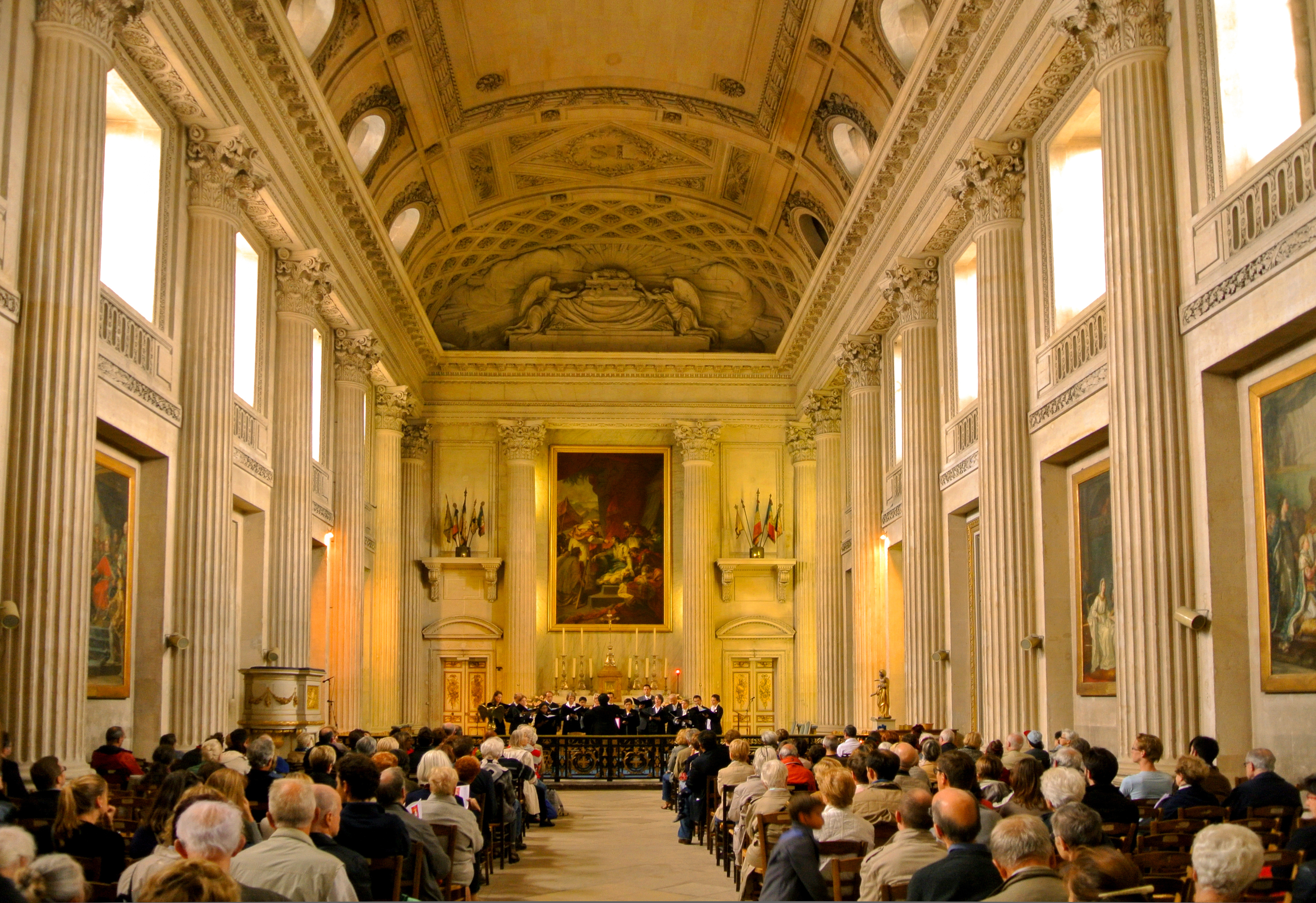
Saint-Louis Chapel

Charged by King Louis XV to design a grander building than the Hôtel des Invalides (constructed by Louis XIV), Ange-Jacques Gabriel broke ground in 1752 on the farm of Grenelle. After years of construction, the school was opened in 1760. Gabriel presented an immense area with beautiful façades and water running through a network of wells and pipes. The entirety was indeed much larger and more striking than the Invalides.

The Comte de Saint-Germain reorganised the establishment in 1777 under the name of the École des Cadets-gentilshommes ("School of Young Gentlemen"), which accepted the young Napoleon Bonaparte in 1784. Bonaparte went on to graduate after only one year instead of the usual two.

== Formation ==
The École militaire now incorporates:

- The École de guerre (EdG) (War College)
- The École de guerre - Terre (EdG-T) (War College - Army)
- the Saint-Louis Chapel, Paris
- The Institut des hautes études de défense nationale (Institute of Advanced Studies in National Defence)
- The Intelligence College in Europe

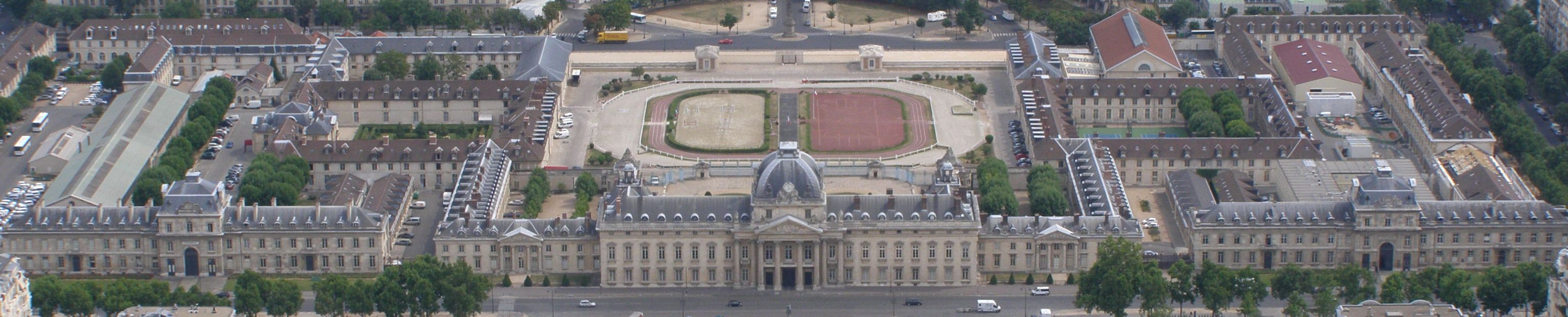
The vast complex formed by the École Militaire

== See also ==
- Ecole de guerre - Terre (EDG-T), Paris
- École spéciale militaire de Saint-Cyr (ESM), Coëtquidan, Brittany
- École de guerre (EdG) (School of Warfare)
- École militaire interarmes (EMIA), Coëtquidan, Brittany
- École supérieure de guerre (1876–1993)
