= École supérieure de guerre =

Former military college in France (1876–1993)

The École supérieure de guerre (French pronunciation: [ekɔl sypeʁjœʁ də ɡɛʁ], "Superior School of Warfare") was the most senior military education institute and staff college of the French Army, from 1876 until 1993, when it was merged into the inter-service Collège interarmées de Défense (Joint Defense College), which was succeeded in 2011 by the École de guerre (School of Warfare). Located in the École militaire complex in Paris, it was responsible for the training of staff officers and general officers.

== Establishment ==
Drawing on lessons from the defeat in the Franco-Prussian War of 1870, General Ernest Courtot de Cissey, Minister of War between 1871 and 1876, decided on 26 January 1876 to establish courses intended to prepare in two years for the functions of military staff and command officers of whom Marshal François Certain de Canrobert, a member of the Conseil supérieur de la guerre (Superior War Council), said that they should henceforth "have a thorough knowledge of the particular and combined use of various weapons".

General Henri-Pierre Castelnau drew up the project for the creation of "special military courses" and in particular fixed the conditions for the entrance examination. On 15 May 1876, 72 trainees of the first promotion were temporarily installed at the Les Invalides under the orders of General Gandil.

General Jules Louis Lewal, who had graduated from the École d'état-major (Military Staff School) in 1848, replaced General Gandil in 1877 and tried to build a theoretical, practical and multidisciplinary education.

Ministerial legislation of 20 March 1880, formally confirmed the establishment of the École supérieure de guerre. In July that same year it moved into the École militaire complex.

== Maillard and Bonnal ==
Battalion commander Louis Goujat dit Maillard took charge of the applied infantry tactics course in 1884. Working mainly on the Battle of Gravelotte, he highlighted the moral factor and deduced principles of action (surprise by concentration of resources, massive artillery action, use of cavalry for shock and pursuit) and a tactical doctrine (slow and progressive wear and tear of the enemy with economy of force to concentrate them at the breaking point). His course became the main course of the school.

Battalion commander Henri Bonnal took charge of the course in military history, strategy and general tactics in 1892. Basing his course on the study of the Battle of Wörth and the Napoleonic Wars, he retained three principles: freedom of action, ability to impose his will on the enemy, economy of force. Bonnal thought he detected in Napoleon a system, that of the avant-garde (Vanguard), which he still considered valid.

Together, they designed the first wargame exercises similar to the German Kriegsspiel.

== Foch ==
From 1895 to 1901, Chef d'escadron Ferdinand Foch taught military history, strategy and general tactics. In 1896 he took over from Bonnal as the course director. Based on the study of the little-known Battle of Náchod during the Austro-Prussian War of 1866, his doctrine gave priority to two notions: that of the "mission" to be fulfilled and that of "safety" to be guaranteed. Always imperatively bringing attention to the orders received and the specificity of each situation, he constantly employs the formula: "What is it about?". To stigmatize the error of a troop which emerging from a cover to approach the enemy does not hold its starting position solidly, he uses the metaphor of the parrot: "The parrot, a sublime animal, when it rises on its perch, does not let go of a bar until after having firmly gripped the next one ...".

== Alumni ==
- Udi Adam (born1958), Israeli general
- Zine El Abidine Ben Ali (1936–2019), Tunisian politician, Brigadier General, and dictator, second President of Tunisia.
- Charles de Gaulle (1890– 1970), French general, President of France
- Alfred Dreyfus (1859–1935), French Army Brigadier-General
- Ferdinand Foch (1851–1929), French general, Marshal of France, member of the Académie Française and Académie des Sciences, and Supreme Allied Commander on the Western Front during the First World War
- Barksdale Hamlett (1908–1979), United States Army four-star general
- Antoine Lahad (1927–2015), Lebanese Army Major General, and subsequently leader of the South Lebanon Army

== See also ==
- Ecole de Guerre-Terre (EDG-T), Paris
- École spéciale militaire de Saint-Cyr (ESM), Coëtquidan, Brittany
- École de guerre (EdG) (School of Warfare)
- École militaire, Paris
- École militaire interarmes (EMIA), Coëtquidan, Brittany
