= École militaire de l'air =

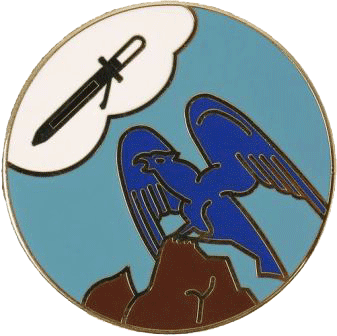
- School crest
- Type: Air Force Academy, Grande École
- Established: 1925
- Location: Salon-de-Provence, Provence-Alpes-Côte d'Azur, France; 43.6192°N 5.11°E

The École militaire de l'air (Air Force Military School) was a military school training officers of the French Air Force. It was the equivalent of the École militaire interarmes for the Army or the École militaire de la flotte for the French Navy. It ran from 1925 to 2015, when it joined the École de l'air.
