= École militaire interarmes =

Coordinates: 47.9444°N 2.1458°W

Combined Arms Military Academy
- École Militaire Interarmes
- Logo Combined Arms Military Academy
- Active: 1961-present
- Country: France
- Branch: French Army
- Type: Military academy
- Role: Army officer training
- Size: Two brigade (subject to review)
- Part of: Army Recruiting and Training Division
- Garrison/HQ: Camp de Coëtquidan
- Nickname: Dolo
- Mottos: Le travail pour loi, l'honneur comme guide "Work for law, honor as a guide"
- Colours: Blue
- March: Sarie Marès
- Website: Official website

Commanders
- Current commander: Major General Antoine Windeck

The École Militaire Interarmes (EMIA) is a military school of the French Army, intended to provide initial training for officers recruited internally from the non-commissioned officer corps and volunteer recruits. It was founded in 1942 and based in Coëtquidan, Morbihan, Brittany.

The EMIA provides initial training for officers recruited via internal promotion rather than an external entrance competition. It allows the best enlisted personnel and non-commissioned officers of the French Army to become officers through two years of training.

== History ==
The EMIA is the heir of various military branch (i.e. infantry, cavalry and artillery) schools dating from the early 19th century and intended to train army officers commissioned from the enlisted ranks (militaires du rang), from among the non-commissioned officers (sous-officiers) or from the reservists (anciens officiers de réserve).

The largest of these army branch schools was the infantry school of Saint-Maixent, which was merged with Saint-Cyr in 1942. The merged academies formed the School of Cherchell-Mediouna, created after the German occupation of the Southern Zone of France. In 1944 the Military Academy at Cherchell took the name of "Joint Military Academy." It moved to Coëtquidan, occupying the buildings of the former Academy of Saint-Cyr. These were subsequently destroyed by bombing.

The new school was reopened in 1947, taking the name of the "Joint Special Military School". Following the principles of amalgamation favoured by its founder, General de Lattre de Tassigny, the school comprised both "direct" officer-cadets entering from civilian life and chosen through external competition; and "semi-direct" officer-cadets selected from serving military personnel.

This system was retained until 1961, when the training of "direct" officers was transferred to the School of Saint-Cyr, and that of "semi-direct" officers was undertaken by the new EMIA. Regardless of the fact that they also receive an officer's commission in the Army, undergraduate students receive a three-year university degree and graduate students receive a one-year master's degree.

Beginning 1986 the then one year officer candidate course was replaced with a two-year program.

== Recruitment and selection ==
In the past, candidates were selected at the Ecole Militaire of Strasbourg. The EMS consisted of two branches: the battalion of unique contest Services (CUS) and the pre-competition pack EMIA (PPEMIA). EMS students also had the opportunity to attend a competition for engineers auxiliary armament.

Candidates competing to enter the Ecole Militaire InterArmes must:

- be between 23 and 35 years old
- hold a baccalaureate
- have served in the Army for at least three years, as of January 1 of the competition year
- be physically fit

Having entered the competition in their unit, the officers must choose one of three courses for the examination: sciences (SI), General Studies (GS), or military science (MS). Then, candidates must first pass a series of written tests to qualify and successfully pass a series of oral and physical tests to be admitted.

== Traditions ==
EMIA students are nicknamed "dolos" after the brand of corned beef of old combat rations. During ceremonies, they wear the parade dress uniform, called "TP" and the curved cavalry saber, representing the future duty as commissioned officers upon graduation. They wear a light blue and red kepi, inherited from the Cherchell Officer Cadet Schoiol.

The songs are EMIA tradition Prayer and Sarie Marès. A popular phrase: "One day Dolo, Dolo forever!"

== Classes since 1961 ==
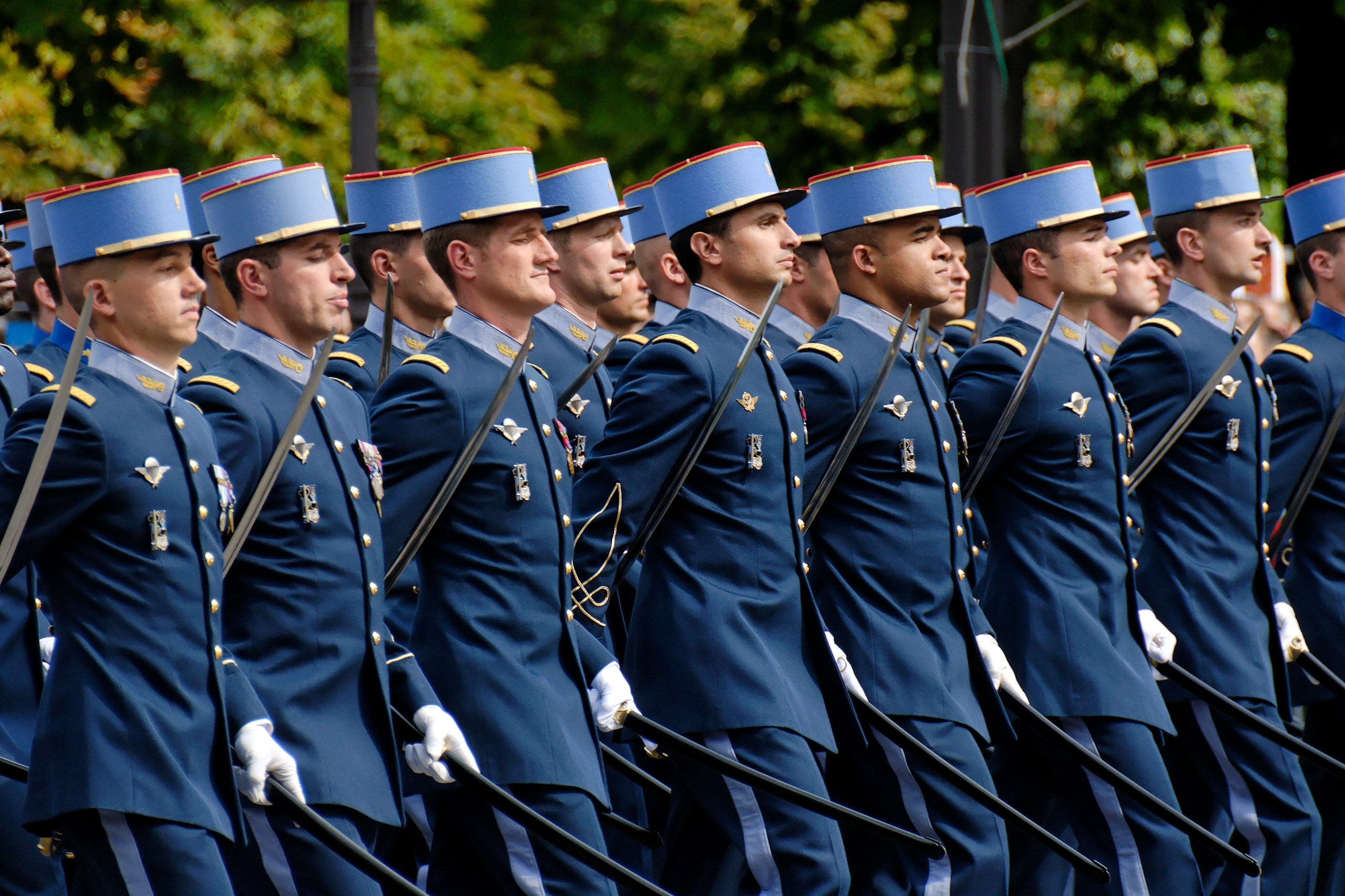
EMIA cadets during the Bastille Day military parade.

One-year classes:
1	1961–1962	Capitaine Bourgin
2	1962–1963	Serment de Koufra
3	1963–1964	Belvédère
4	1964–1965	André Zirnheld
5	1965–1966	Cinquantenaire de Verdun
6	1966–1967	Connétable du Guesclin
7	1967–1968	Narvik
8	1968–1969	Libération de Strasbourg
9	1969–1970	Plateau des Glières
10	1970–1971	Général Kœnig
11	1971–1972	Souvenir
12	1972–1973	Général Marceau
13	1973–1974	Général Brosset
14	1974–1975	Capitaine Cazaux
15	1975–1976	Capitaine Cardonne
16	1976–1977	Capitaine de Belsunce
17	1977–1978	Lieutenant Chezeau
18	1978–1979	Général Laurier
19	1979–1980	Lieutenant-colonel Broche
20	1980–1981	Capitaine Cozette
21	1981–1982	Centenaire
22	1982–1983	Lieutenant Leclerc de Hauteclocque
23	1983–1984	Lieutenant Borgniet
24	1984–1985	Lieutenant Bernard de Lattre de Tassigny
25	1985–1986	Lieutenant Lhuillier

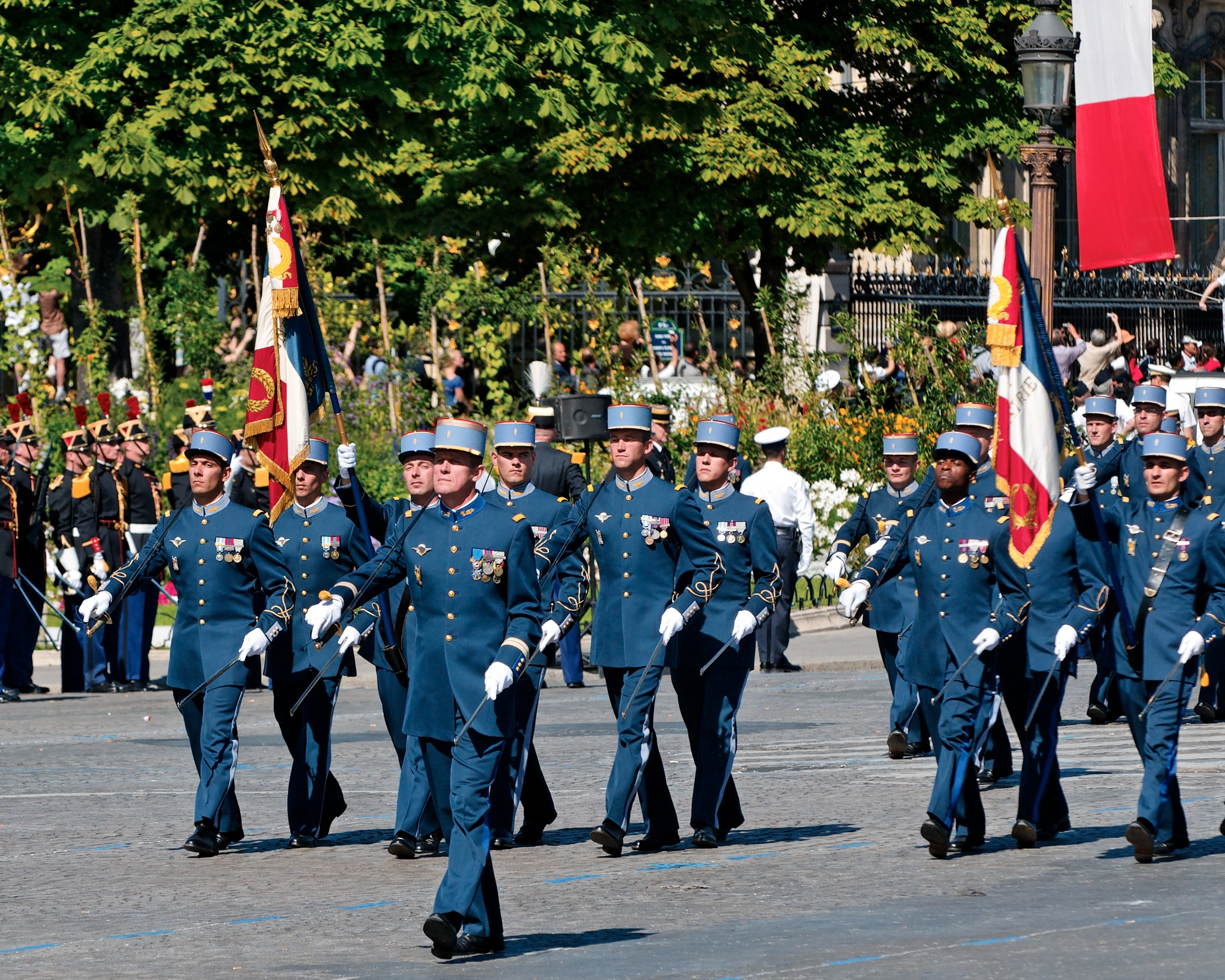
The standard guards of the École militaire interarmes (EMIA) and of the École militaire du corps technique et administratif (EMCTA), parade on the 14th of July 2008 on the Champs-Élysées, Paris. The Minister of Defence Gérard Longuet presented on 14 May 2011 the Cross of the Légion d'honneur to the EMIA, on the occasion of the fiftieth anniversary of the founding of this school.

Two-year classes:
26	1986–1988	Dalat
27	1987–1989	Capitaine Legrand
28	1988–1990	Valmy
29	1989–1991	Bataillon de Corée
30	1990–1992	Général Daboval
31	1991–1993	Capitaine Barrès (Biographie de Claude Barrès)
32	1992–1994	Combats de Tu-Le
33	1993–1995	Capitaine Maine
34	1994–1996	Cadets de Cherchell
35	1995–1997	Lieutenant Schaffar
36	1996–1998	Général Gandoët
37	1997–1999	Grande Guerre
38	1998–2000	Général Berge
39	1999–2001	Campagne d'Italie
40	2000–2002	Capitaine Coignet
41	2001–2003	Capitaine Biancamaria
42	2002–2004	Lieutenant de Ferrières
43	2003–2005	Général de Lanlay
44	2004–2006	Colonel Guéguen
45	2005–2007	Colonel Delcourt
46	2006–2008	Lieutenant De La Batie
47	2007–2009	Général de Corps d'Armée Le Ray
48	2008–2010	Capitaine Flores
49	2009–2011	Colonel du Puy-Montbrun
50	2010–2012	Général Bigeard
51	2011–2013	Maréchal Bessières
52	2012–2014	Ceux d'Afghanistan

== See also ==
- Camp de Coëtquidan
- L'Épaulette magazine
- École nationale des sous-officiers d'active
- Ecole de Guerre-Terre (EDG-T), Paris
- École spéciale militaire de Saint-Cyr (ESM), Coëtquidan, Brittany
- École de guerre (EdG) (School of Warfare)
- École militaire, Paris
- École supérieure de guerre (1876 - 1993)
