= David Galula =

French Army officer and counterinsurgency theorist (1919–1967)

- (c. 1939–1940)
- Born: 10 January 1919; Sfax, Tunisia
- Died: 11 May 1967 (aged 48); Arpajon, France
- Military career
- Allegiance: France
- Branch: French Army
- Service years: 1939–1962
- Rank: Lieutenant colonel
- Nickname: Jean Caran (pseudonym)
- Commands: 3rd Company, 45th Colonial Infantry Battalion
- Conflicts: World War II; Liberation of France; Algerian War
- Other work: Research associate at Harvard University

David Galula (10 January 1919 – 11 May 1967) was a French military officer and scholar who was influential in developing the theory and practice of counterinsurgency warfare.

== Early life ==
Born in Sfax, then part of the French protectorate of Tunisia, on 10 January 1919 into a family of Jewish merchants, Galula obtained his baccalauréat in Casablanca at the Lycée Lyautey.

While often incorrectly infered to be from pieds noir origin, Galula was a Sephardic Jew who remained without French citizenship until 1924.

In 1949, Galula married Ruth Beed Morgan (1922–2011). He is survived by his only son, Daniel Frederic Galula, born in Paris in 1959, and his grandchildren, David Salvador Galula and Danielle Sophia Galula.

== Military career ==
Galula graduated from the École spéciale militaire de Saint-Cyr in the number 126 promotion of 1939–1940. Throughout the Battle of France he remained garrisoned in Morocco.

Antisemtism had a major impact on Galulas military career. In 1941, he was expelled from the French officer corps, in accordance with the Law on the status of Jews of the Vichy State. He remained stripped of commission for nearly two years, even after the Allies had landed in during Operation Torch as prominent French commanders had initially resisted Jewish reintegration.

After living as a civilian in North Africa, he joined the I Corps of the Army of the Liberation, and served during the liberation of France, receiving a wound during the invasion of Elba in June 1944.

Galula departed for China in 1945 to work as an assistant military attaché at the French embassy in Beijing. There he continued his warm relationship with Jacques Guillermaz, an officer from an old French military family with whom he had served in France. Galula's wife recalled that her husband went to China to follow Guillermaz, who was, "without a doubt, the most influential person in David's life." Galula witnessed the rise to power of the Chinese Communist Party. In April 1947, he was captured by Chinese Communists during a solo trip into the interior. Though he was fiercely anti-Communist, his captors treated him well and he eventually was released through the help of the Marshall mission. In 1948, he took part in the United Nations Special Committee on the Balkans (UNSCOB) during the Greek Civil War. From 1952 to February 1956, he served as a military attaché at the French consulate in Hong Kong. He visited the Philippines, and studied the Indochina War without taking part in it.

From August 1956 to April 1958, during the Algerian War, Galula, then a captain, led the 3rd Company of the 45th Bataillon d'Infanterie Coloniale. He distinguished himself by applying personal tactics in counterinsurgency to his sector of Kabylie, at Djebel Mimoun, near Tigzirt, effectively eliminating the nationalist insurgency in his sector and earning accelerated promotion from this point.

In 1958, Galula was transferred to the Headquarters of National Defence in Paris. He gave a series of conferences abroad and attended the Armed Forces Staff College.

== Later life and death ==
Galula resigned his commission in 1962 to study in the United States, where he obtained a position of research associate at the Center for International Affairs of Harvard University.

He died in 1967 of lung cancer. He is survived by his only son Daniel Frederic Galula, his wife Claudia Elena, and his grandchildren David Salvador and Danielle Sophia Galula.

== Theory and influence ==
Galula described his experiences in two books, Pacification in Algeria, published by the RAND Corporation in 1963, and Counterinsurgency Warfare: Theory and Practice in 1964. His books analyse his experiences in Indochina, Greece and Algeria, giving a taxonomy of favourable and unfavourable settings for a revolutionary war from the point of view of both the revolutionary (insurgent) and loyalist (counterinsurgent) forces. Galula cites Mao Zedong's observation that "[R]evolutionary war is 80 percent political action and only 20 percent military", and proposes four "laws" for counterinsurgency:

1. The aim of the war is to gain the support of the population rather than control of territory.
2. Most of the population will be neutral in the conflict; support of the masses can be obtained with the help of an active friendly minority.
3. Support of the population may be lost. The population must be efficiently protected to allow it to cooperate without fear of retribution by the opposite party.
4. Order enforcement should be done progressively by removing or driving away armed opponents, then gaining the support of the population, and eventually strengthening positions by building infrastructure and setting long-term relationships with the population. This must be done area by area, using a pacified territory as a basis of operation to conquer a neighbouring area.

Galula's laws thus take at face value and recognize the importance of the aphorism, based on the ideas of Mao, that "The people are the sea in which the revolutionary swims." He contends that:

A victory [in a counterinsurgency] is not the destruction in a given area of the insurgent's forces and his political organization. ... A victory is that plus the permanent isolation of the insurgent from the population, isolation not enforced upon the population, but maintained by and with the population. ... In conventional warfare, strength is assessed according to military or other tangible criteria, such as the number of divisions, the position they hold, the industrial resources, etc. In revolutionary warfare, strength must be assessed by the extent of support from the population as measured in terms of political organization at the grassroots. The counterinsurgent reaches a position of strength when his power is embedded in a political organization issuing from, and firmly supported by, the population.

With his four principles in mind, Galula goes on to describe a general military and political strategy to put them into operation in an area that is under full insurgent control:

In a Selected Area

1. Concentrate enough armed forces to destroy or to expel the main body of armed insurgents.
2. Detach for the area sufficient troops to oppose an insurgent's comeback in strength, install these troops in the hamlets, villages, and towns where the population lives.
3. Establish contact with the population, control its movements in order to cut off its links with the guerillas.
4. Destroy the local insurgent political organization.
5. Set up, by means of elections, new provisional local authorities.
6. Test those authorities by assigning them various concrete tasks. Replace the softs and the incompetents, give full support to the active leaders. Organize self-defense units.
7. Group and educate the leaders in a national political movement.

8. Win over or suppress the last insurgent remnants.

Some of these steps can be skipped in areas that are only partially under insurgent control, and most of them are unnecessary in areas already controlled by the government. Thus the essence of counterinsurgency warfare is summed up by Galula as "Build (or rebuild) a political machine from the population upward."

Galula has been considered an important theorist by contemporary defence experts. Notably, the United States military used his experiences as examples in the context of the Iraq War and he is often quoted in the US Army's Counterinsurgency Manual. Galula's Counterinsurgency Warfare: Theory and Practice is highly suggested reading for students of the U.S. Army Command and General Staff College.

Galula's work on counter-insurgency is in large part based on the experiences and lesson of 130 years of French colonial warfare, most notably the work of Joseph-Simon Gallieni and Hubert Lyautey. He was also influenced by Jacques Guillermaz, with whom he disagreed on the handling of counter-revolutionary warfare, but who gave Galula intellectual mentorship during the years following 1945 when they served in China. The older soldier imparted an intellectual approach to military and geopolitical analysis.

== Works ==
- Counterinsurgency Warfare: Theory and Practice. Wesport, Connecticut: Praeger Security International, 1964, ISBN 0-275-99269-1
- Les Moustaches du tigre. Flammarion, 1965 (under the pseudonym of Jean Caran), ISBN 2-08-050086-4
- Pacification in Algeria, 1956–1958. RAND Corporation, 2006, ISBN 0-8330-3920-2
