= Lucien Poirier =

French military general and theoretician

- Born: 1918; France
- Died: 10 January 2013; France
- Alma mater: Ecole Spéciale Militaire de Saint-Cyr
- Military career
- Allegiance: France
- Branch: French Army
- Service years: 1939–1974
- Rank: General
- Unit: French Foreign Legion
- Conflicts: World War II; First Indochina War; Algerian War
- Other work: military strategist

Lucien Poirier (1918 – 10 January 2013) was a general of the French Army and a theoretician of nuclear deterrence.

== Military career ==
Poirier began his military service at the beginning of World War II, after graduating from Special Military School of Saint-Cyr, and he was imprisoned in Germany until 1945. After the war, Poirier continued in the military with the French Foreign Legion (beginning as a Captain) in conflicts in Indochina (First Indochina War) and Algeria (Algerian War).

Poirier took part in the design of the French doctrine for use of nuclear weapons, the so-called "weak-to-strong strategy" (statégie du faible au fort), intended to deter the much stronger Soviet Union from invading France and Europe.

== Academic career ==
Poirier began to write while in the French Army in 1968. After being promoted to General in 1974, he retired to become an academic specializing in military strategy at Université de Paris (now Pantheon-Sorbonne University l’Ecole des Hautes Etudes en Sciences Sociales (EHESS), Pantheon-Sorbonne University à l’Ecole normale supérieure (ENS) and École nationale d'administration (ENA).

Poirier authored several books on the subject of military strategy and nuclear deterrence:

- Des stratégies nucléaires, Paris Hachette, 1977.
- Essais de stratégie théorique, Institut de stratégie comparée, 1982.
- Stratégies nucléaires, Bruxelles, Complexe, 1988.
- La Crise des fondements, Paris, ISC/Economica, 1994.
- La réserve et l'attente : l'avenir des armes nucléaires françaises, with François Géré, Economica, Paris, 2001, 329 pp.

== Later life ==
Porier remained active into his 90s and died on 9 or 10 January 2013. He was 94.
