= Jean Desclaux (French army officer) =

French army officer

Jean Antoine Gabriel Alexandre Desclaux
- Nickname: Mokekina Kolo
- Born: 27 October 1874; Rabastens, France
- Died: 20 May 1943 (aged 68)
- Branch: French Army
- Service years: 1897–1936
- Rank: Major General
- Conflicts: Yangere Uprising of 1906
- Spouse: Marie Louise Vernhes

Jean Antoine Gabriel Alexandre Desclaux (October 27, 1874 – May 20, 1943) was a French army officer during the French colonization of Africa and the interwar period.

Desclaux was born to Jean Jacques and Henriette Alexandrine in 1874 in Rabastens, France. In 1894, he began studying at the École spéciale militaire de Saint-Cyr.

== Military career ==
Desclaux graduated from Saint-Cyr in 1896 and was deployed to French Sudan a year later. In 1901 he was sent to Madagascar. Afterwards, he came back to France, where he married Marie Louise Vernhes on November 30, 1904 and was promoted to the rank of captain. In 1905, he was sent to French Middle Congo where he replaced Captain Joseph Méchet in November as head of Lobaye-Ibenga-Motaba circonscription until October 1907. He led French colonial forces in 1906 to crush rebellions led by the Banda Yangere in the Lesse, Bodengue, and Lobaye valleys, as well as around Bambio. In 1908 he was reassigned to the Mbaiki subdivision until 1909, where he earned the name Mokekina Kolo by the locals.

In 1925, Desclaux was granted the rank of Brigadier General in the French colonial army. In 1931, he was promoted to Major General and replaced Henry Freydenberg as commander of the 1st Senegalese Colonial Division. In 1933, he was assigned to command the colonial garrison at Toulouse, until 1936 when he retired. He died on May 20, 1943, at age 68.
