= Jacques Guillermaz =

- Born: 16 January 1911; Fort-de-France, Martinique
- Died: February 4, 1998 (aged 87); Belley, Ain, France
- Education: St Cyr
- Occupations: Military officer, diplomat, scholar
- Writing career
- Subject: Chinese Communist Party
- Notable works: Le parti communiste chinois au pouvoir (1e octobre 1949-1e mars 1972); Histoire du parti communiste chinois
- Notable awards: Prix de l’Académie française; 1973 Prix Albéric Rocheron for Le parti communiste chinois au pouvoir (1e octobre 1949-1e mars 1972); 1969 Prix Albéric Rocheron for Histoire du parti communiste chinois

Jacques Guillermaz (French pronunciation: [ʒak ɡijɛʁma]; 16 January 1911 – 4 February 1998) was a French diplomat, military officer, and scholar of modern Chinese history. He served as military attaché in China from 1937 to 1943, then returned to fight for the liberation of France in 1943, served once more in China from 1945 to 1951, and went on to advise the French government on policy toward Asia. In 1958 he founded the Center for Research and Documentation on Modern and Contemporary China and wrote widely on modern Chinese affairs. He is particularly known for his studies of Chinese Communist Party history.

His honors include reaching the rank of General in the French Army and receiving the Académie française Prix Albéric Rocheron in 1969 for Histoire du parti communiste chinois and again in 1973 for his book, Le parti communiste chinois au pouvoir.

== Military career ==
Guillermaz was born in Fort-de-France, Martinique into a family with a history of military service. After graduating from the Saint-Cyr Military Academy in 1937, Guillermaz was sent to Beijing as deputy military attaché. The Second Sino-Japanese War erupted just as he arrived, and though France was not a belligerent in that war, instead of withdrawing, Guillermaz took the opportunity to travel in wartorn North China before making his way to Chongqing, the wartime capital, by way of Shanghai and Hanoi. He spent the years from 1941 to 1943 in Chongqing, then left China to join the Free French Army in Algiers.

He fought in the liberation of Elba and of France in 1944, commanding first a company and then a battalion which repelled a German counteroffensive. The battalion's intelligence office was David Galula, and the two struck up a warm relationship. Guillermaz later invited Galula to work with him in China. In 1945 Guillermaz was sent to China as military attaché, a post which he held in Nanjing for the next six years, and saw the 1949 takeover of the city by the People's Liberation Army in 1948. In 1951 he was posted to Bangkok. He retired from active duty in the army in 1958

== Diplomacy and scholarship ==
Guillermaz used his knowledge of China and of Chinese leaders in advising the French government, which saw the new government in China as a threat to the French colonies in Indochina. Guillermaz saw also that the French could take advantage of the divisions within the communist movement in Asia. As an adviser to the French delegation at the Geneva conference on Vietnam in 1954. Colonel Guillermaz let the Chinese leaders know that normal relations might be possible if Beijing played a constructive role. Again in 1961-1962 he supported the French diplomatic staff at the Geneva Conference on Laos. In 1964, shortly before France extended diplomatic recognition to the People's Republic, he was sent to Taiwan to inform President Chiang Kai-shek of the impending move. He told Generalissimo Chiang that his situation was much like that of General DeGaulle, who was in exile in London during World War II, and, like him, might return to the "mainland." Guillermaz himself, however, once again was made military attache to the French Embassy in Beijing, arriving, as he had in 1937, on the eve of conflict. In 1965, however, the conflict was the Cultural Revolution, the internal conflict which split China into warring factions. In Beijing, Guillermaz met and married Kirsti Ritopeura, a Finn.

The training of French specialists in Asia was a particular interest. France had a long and distinguished tradition of sinology which focused on classical China, but Guillermaz urged the study of contemporary China. In 1958, at the suggestion of the 6th section of the Practical School for Higher Studies (EPHE) — which subsequently became the École des hautes études en sciences sociales (EHESS) — he agreed to set up and run the Le Centre d'études sur la Chine moderne et contemporaine (Center for Research and Documentation on modern and contemporary China). The Centre funded or offered affiliation to many, if not most, French scholars working on contemporary China. The Centre produced a number of publications, conferences, radio and television appearances, and a Guillermaz contributed a series of articles to the influential Paris journals Le Monde and Le Figaro. These efforts brought the French public knowledge of China, a country which was then in the throes of the Cultural Revolution, and dissipated the illusions about that country on the part of a considerable portion of the French intelligentsia.

Guillermaz donated his collection of an estimated 2,500 volumes, predominately Chinese language works, to the Municipal Library of Lyon because of its long association with Chinese students and China.

After retirement from the Centre in 1976, he lived the last twenty years of his life in the village where he had been born, Dauphiné, in the countryside near Grenoble. There he wrote his memoirs and continued to follow events in China. He died there in 1998 at the age of 87.

== Selected publications ==
- La Chine populaire, Paris, Presses universitaires de France, « Que sais-je », 1959; 10th ed. 1992.
- Histoire du Parti communiste chinois : 1921-1949, Paris, Payot, 1968; New ed. 2004.
- —— (1972). A History of the Chinese Communist Party. London: Methuen. ISBN 0416147100.
- —— (1975). Histoire Du Parti Communiste Chinois. Paris: Payot. ISBN 2228325708.
- —— (1976). The Chinese Communist Party in Power, 1949-1976. Boulder, Colo.: Westview Press. ISBN 0891580417.
- —— (1977). La Chine Populaire. Paris: PUF.
- —— (1977). The Chinese Communist Party in Power, 1949-1976. Folkestone: Dawson. ISBN 0712907521.
- —— (1979). Le Parti Communiste Chinois Au Pouvoir. Paris: Payot. ISBN 2228335800.
- —— (1989). Une Vie Pour La Chine : Mémoires, 1937-1989. Paris: Editions Robert Laffont. ISBN 2221059751. reissued 1993.
- Articles by Jacques Guillermaz at Persée.fr.

== References and further reading ==
- Aubert, Claude (2000). "Jacques Guillermaz (1911–1998)". The China Quarterly. 161: 296–299. doi:10.1017/S0305741000004057.
- Bibliothèque municipale de Lyon (2014). "Jacques Guillermaz (1911-1998)". Bibliothèque municipale de Lyon
- Bianco, Lucien (1998), "Jacques Guillermaz, 1911-1998," Perspectives chinoises, vol. 45, p. 34-35.
- Chevrier, Yves (2014), "Guillermaz Jacques (1911-1998)", Encyclopædia Universalis, consulté le 21 octobre 2014.
- Chevrier, Yves (1998), "Jacques Guillermaz," Lettre d’information de l’AFEC, no 28, July, pp. 2–4
- Eyraud, Henri (2003), "Le Général Jacques Guillermaz (1911-1998), pionnier de la Chine contemporaine," Revue Historique Des Armées, no 1, p. 63-64.
- Jan, Michel (2008), "Jaques Guillermaz", in Pouillon, François (ed.), Dictionnaire Des Orientalistes De Langue Française, Paris: IlSMM : Karthala, pp. 469–470, ISBN 9782845868021
