= École spéciale militaire de Saint-Cyr =

French military academy

- Motto: Ils s'instruisent pour vaincre (French)
- Motto in English: They study to vanquish
- Type: Military college
- Established: 1 May 1802; 224 years ago
- Affiliations: French Army
- Commandant: Général Patrick Collet
- Location: Coëtquidan, Guer, Morbihan, French Republic; 47.9453°N 2.1522°W
- Campus: Rural
- Colors: Red – White – Blue
- Nicknames: Saint-cyrien, cyrard
- Website: ESM Saint-Cyr

The École spéciale militaire de Saint-Cyr (French: [ekɔl spesjal militɛʁ də sɛ̃ siʁ], lit. 'Special Military School of Saint-Cyr', abbr. ESM), commonly known as Saint-Cyr, is a military academy of the French Army. It is located in Coëtquidan in Guer, Morbihan, Brittany. French cadet officers are called saint-cyriens or cyrards.

French students who enter Saint-Cyr as cadets are about 21 years old, and undergo three years of training. All ESM cadets graduate with a Master of Arts or a Master of Science and are commissioned officers.

The academy was founded in Fontainebleau in 1802 by Napoleon. It was moved in 1806 to the buildings of the former Maison Royale de Saint-Louis, in Saint-Cyr-l'École, west of Paris. During the Second World War, the cadets moved several times due to the German invasion. They eventually settled in 1945 in the Coëtquidan military camp in Morbihan.

France's other senior military institutes are the École de guerre and the École de guerre - Terre, located in the École militaire complex, in Paris.

== History ==
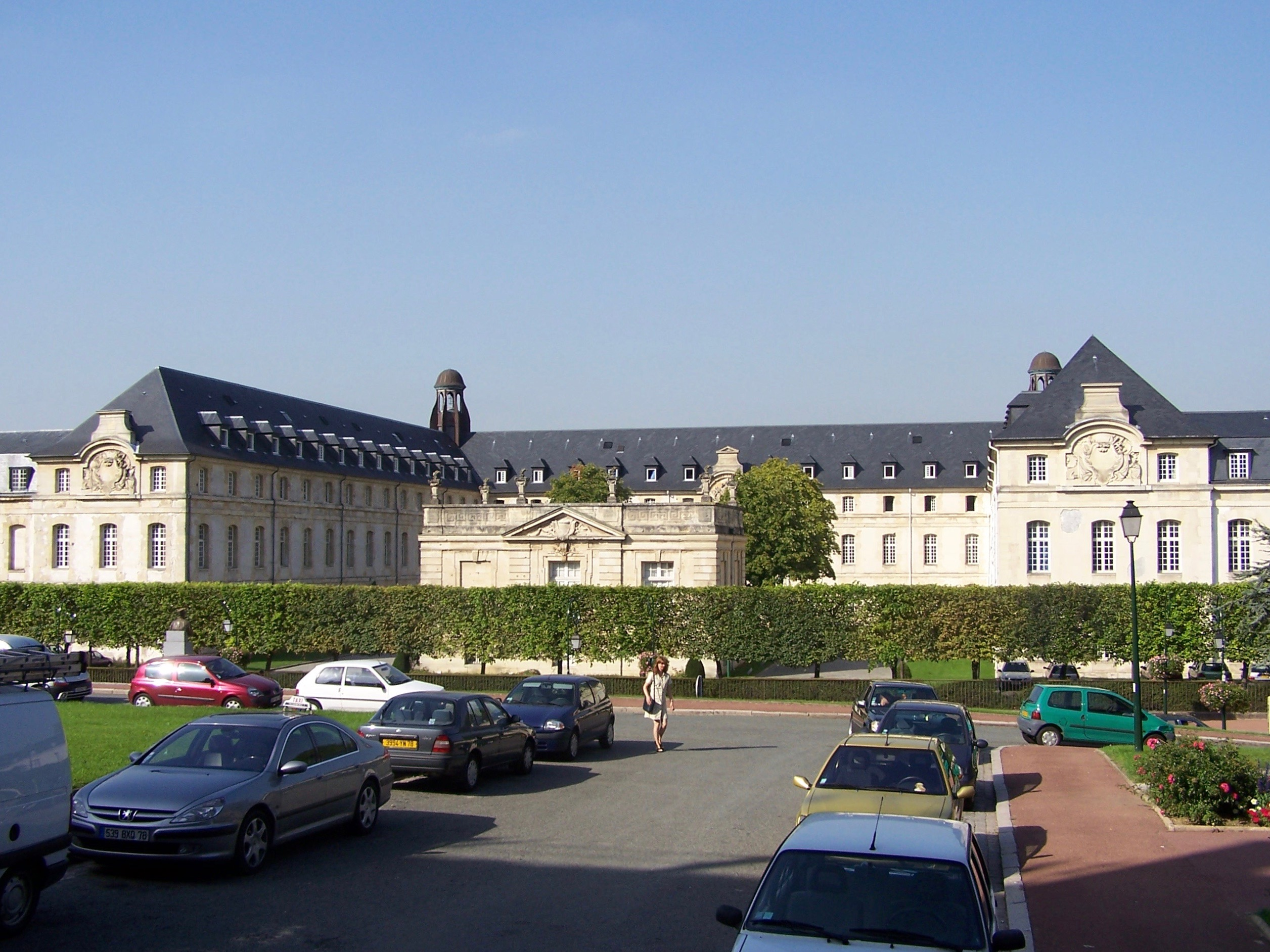
Lycée militaire de Saint-Cyr, seat of the Academy from 1808 to 1940, now in Camp Coëtquidan.

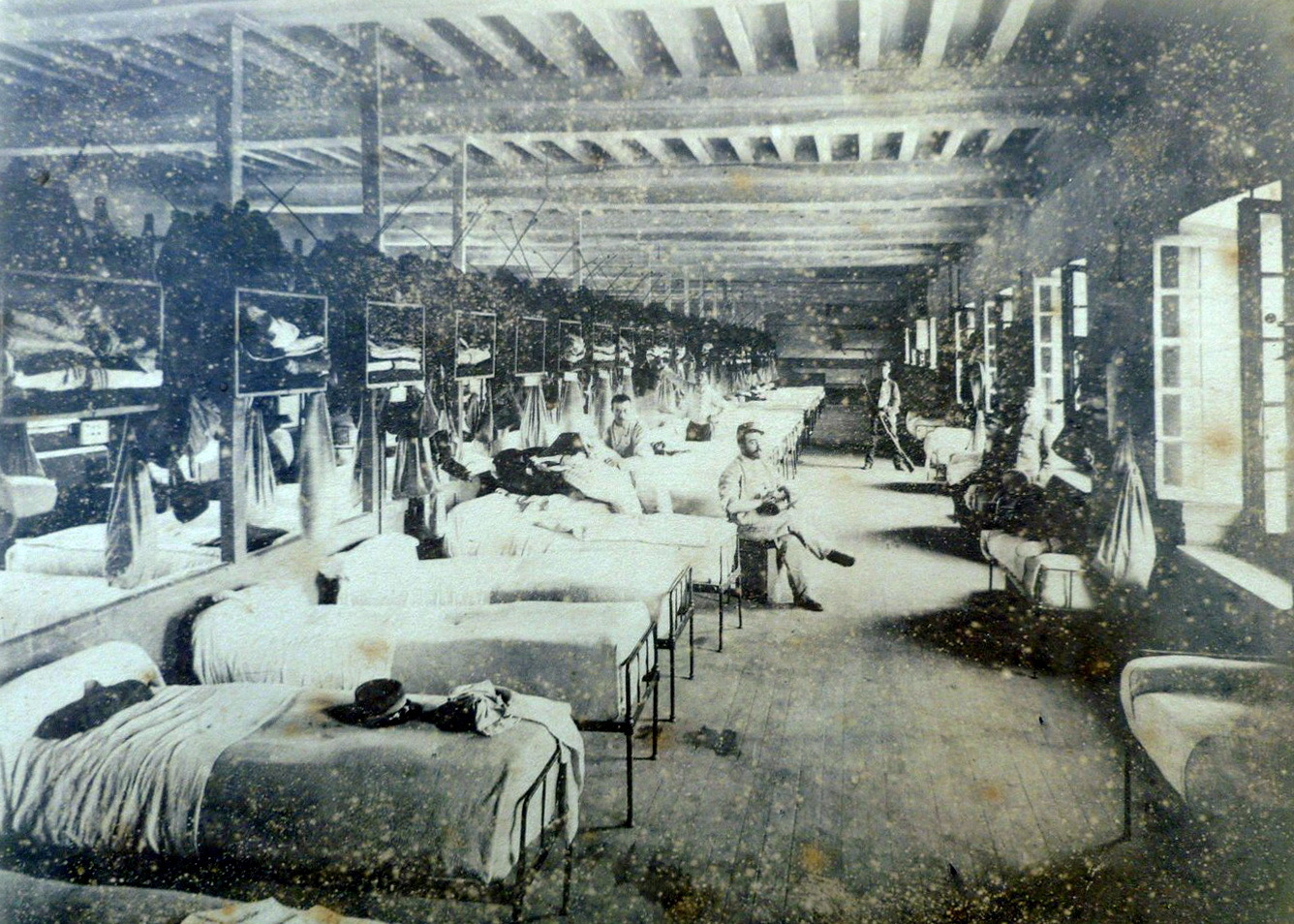
Dormitory "Sébastopol" at Saint-Cyr, photographed by Jules David in 1886

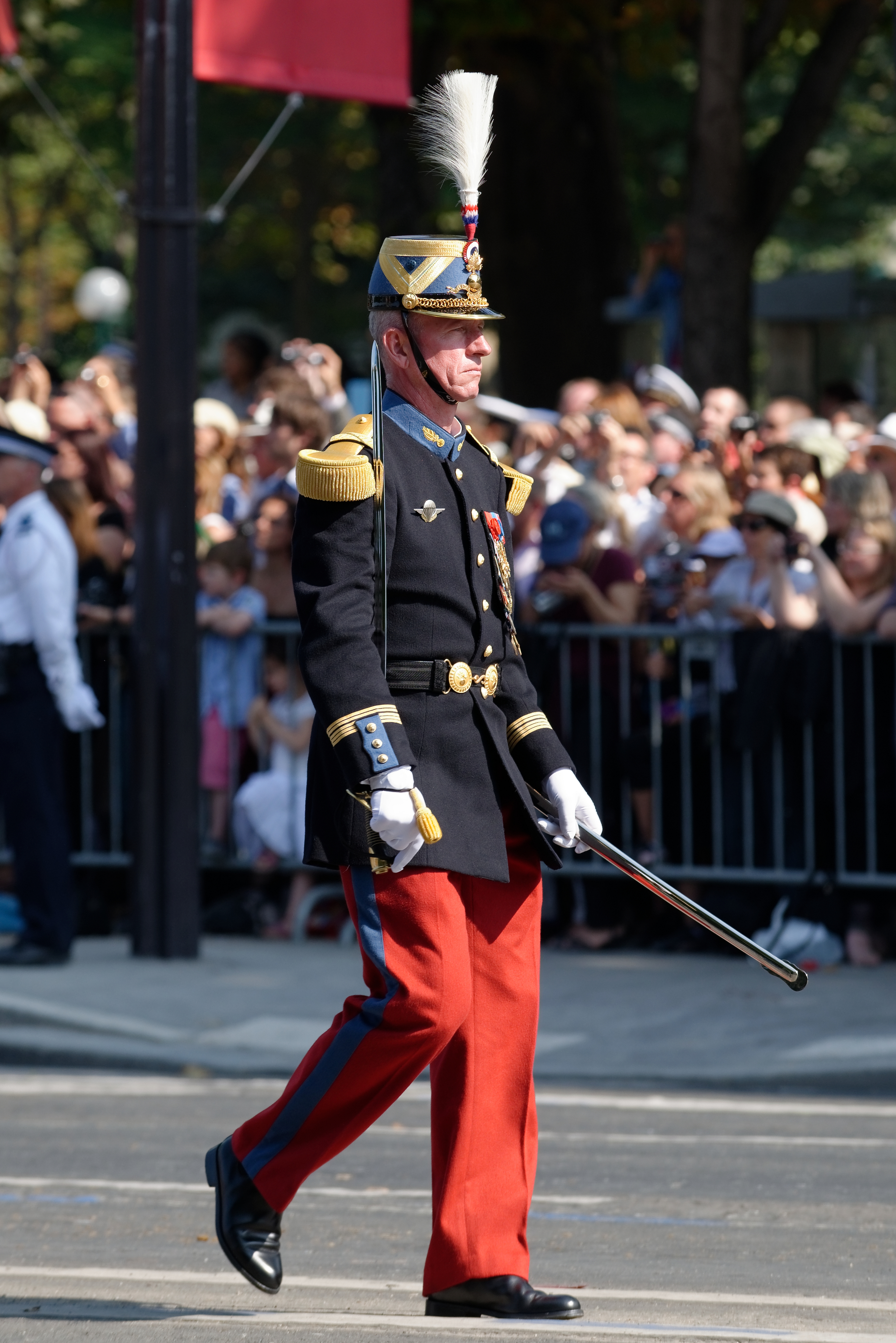
A colonel, supervisor of the Cadets' studies, during the Bastille Day Military Parade.

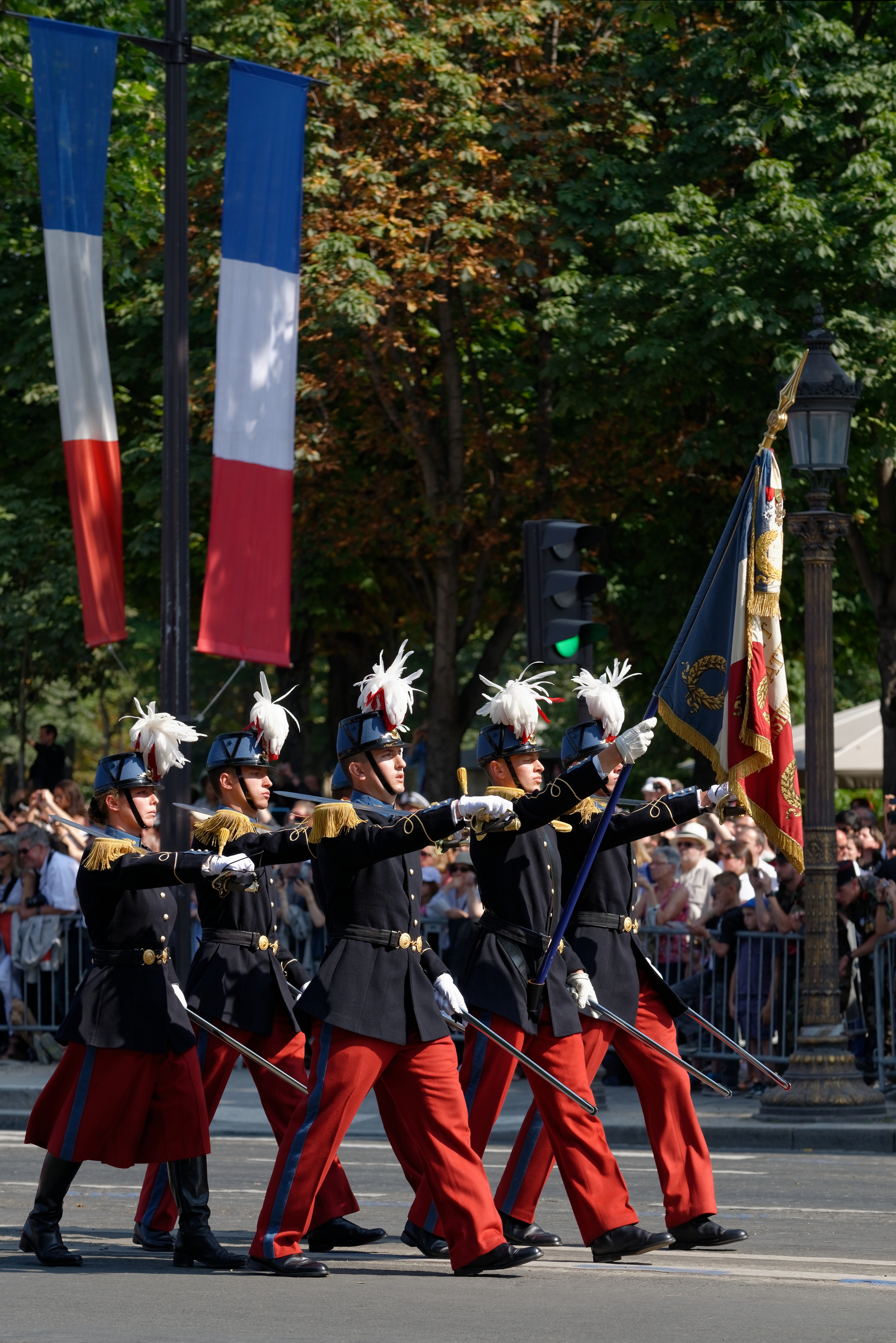
The Color guard of Saint-Cyr.

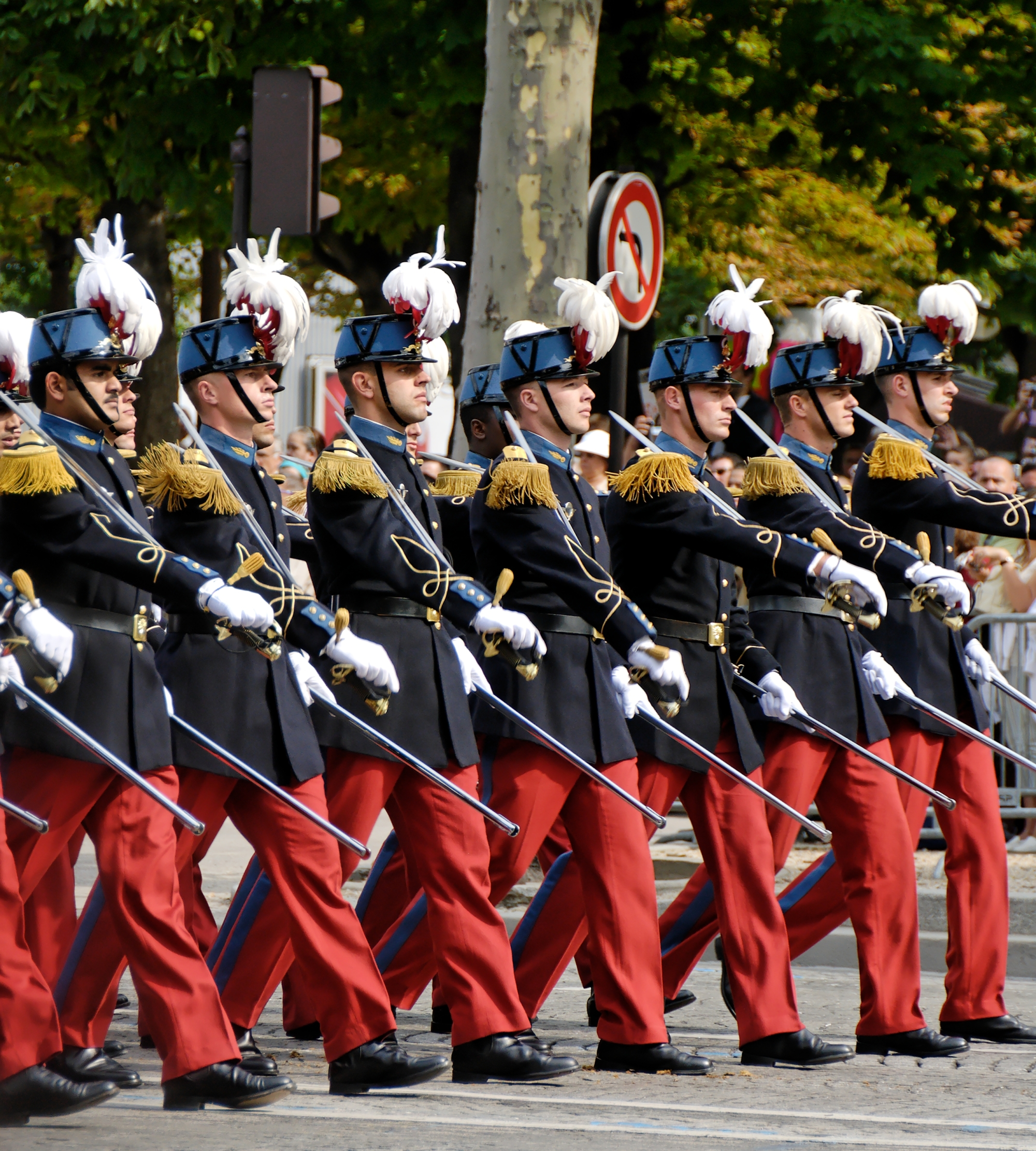
The 1st rank of the first company of cadets.

The École spéciale militaire de Saint-Cyr was created by order of Napoleon Bonaparte on 1 May 1802 (the Law of 11 Floréal an X according to the then-official revolutionary calendar), to replace the École Royale Militaire then located in Fontainebleau. Renamed the École Spéciale Impériale Militaire after Bonaparte was proclaimed emperor, it moved in 1808 to Saint-Cyr-l'École (Yvelines) in the castle of the former Maison royale de Saint-Louis, a school for girls of the French nobility disbanded at the time of the Revolution.

The school trained a large number of young officers and generals who served during the Napoleonic Wars, and later Napoleon III created the Prince Imperial division for family members, It remained stationed in Saint-Cyr-l'École after Napoleon's deposition and through all regime changes until 1940. After the defeat of the French Army against Germany in 1940, the school moved to the free zone, in the south of France, in Aix-en-Provence. After the invasion of the free zone by the Germans in 1942, the school was disbanded, but French cadet officer training went on, part in Cherchell (Algeria, then Free French territory) and part in the United Kingdom (Cadets de la France Libre) under General de Gaulle's command, albeit under British supervision and guidance.

At the Libération of France in 1944, the school was reunited under the command of General de Lattre de Tassigny and settled in the somewhat remote and isolated military camp of Coëtquidan, Morbihan, because the "vieux bahut" (old school) had been severely damaged by an Allied bombing during the Libération campaign.

Saint-Cyr has remained there to this day. A reform in 1961 split the school into two entities: the current École Spéciale Militaire de Saint-Cyr (ESM), devoted to the training of direct-recruitment officers, recruited through an annual national competitive exam, and the École Militaire Interarmes (EMIA), cadets from internal recruitment (selected from non-commissioned officer (NCO) ranks and reserve officer ranks) and added a third entity, the École Militaire du Corps Technique et Administratif (EMCTA), devoted to the formation of administrative specialist officers and generals. The school admitted its first female cadets in 1983 and underwent a minor reform in 2002 devised to broaden the diversity of its recruitment. In 2021, the more younger Officer Candidate School Coëtquidan (École militaire des aspirants de Coëtquidan) became part of the school complex as the French Army's official officer candidate school sharing the same campus as the ESM.

Since 1802, 65,000 Saint-Cyriens have been trained, along with 2,000 international cadets. Of the French graduates 9,639 died on the field of battle. Alumni also count 11 Maréchaux de France, three French heads of state, two flying aces, six members of the Académie Française, and one Saint of the Catholic Church.

The school has links with the Royal Military College of Canada, United States Military Academy (West Point), and the Royal Military Academy Sandhurst in Britain, including student exchanges.

=== Motto ===
Napoleon's original motto, "Ils s'instruisent pour vaincre" ("They study to overcome/conquer/win"), was changed by the restoration king, Louis XVIII, to: "Ils s'instruisent pour la Défense de la Patrie" ("They study for the Defence of the Fatherland"). The Napoleonic version was used again from 1848 to 1870. That motto was next changed to "Honneur et Patrie" ("Honour and Fatherland") until 1918, when it reverted again to the original Napoleonic wording.

== Museum ==
The museum is open to the public Tuesday, Wednesday, Thursday and Friday mornings from 10 a.m. – 12 a.m. to group tours and afternoons to the public on Tuesday, Wednesday and Friday from 2:30 p.m. – 5 p.m. On the weekend, the museum is open to the public from 10 a.m. – 12 a.m. and from 2 p.m. – 6 p.m. The museum is closed to the public on Mondays and it is closed from 2:30 p.m. to 5 p.m. on Thursdays. The museum is located on Rivoli court. The permanent collection explores the lives of the Saint-Cyrien from the end of the ancient regime to today. The collection shows the evolution of the uniform, personal objects, artwork, authentic documents, arms, clothing and family relics.

== Traditions ==
=== Class names and insignia ===
Since 1829, every class (promotion) of Saint-Cyr chooses a name. It can be a nickname (du Firmament, "of the Stars", for the first one), the name of a famous battle (Sevastopol for the 1855–56 Class), the name of a famous soldier or general (Bayard, 1923–25 Class, Foch, 1928–30 Class). Since 1934, every class also chooses a special insignia.

=== Uniform ===
Cadets of Saint-Cyr wear in full dress (grand uniforme or GU) a special uniform, derived from the 1845 Regulations Infantry Officer Dress. This dress incorporates a dark-blue tunic, red trousers (red skirts for female cadets) and a shako with red and white plumes. Tunic facings and trouser stripes are light blue, as is the képi worn on less formal occasions. Red fringed epaulettes are worn by cadets and yellow by cadet-officers. This traditional uniform was worn by both cadets and instructors at Saint-Cyr from 1845 until 1914 and then again from 1930 until 1939. After World War II it was again adopted in 1949.

The shako plumes are nicknamed Casoars (cassowaries), because they were first adopted in 1855 at the time of this colorful bird's first appearance in the Paris Zoo. While the plumes were not at first welcomed by the cadets, they have become a symbol of Saint-Cyr. The Saint-Cyr cadets of the class of 1913–14, graduating ahead of time with the outbreak of World War I, reportedly vowed to lead their platoons in battle wearing the casoar on their service kepis.

=== Ceremonies ===
The various steps of the cadets' formation are celebrated in various ceremonies, all performed during nighttime. At the beginning of the first year, after boot camp, the cadets are welcomed with shakos granted to them by the third-year cadets. This is called the petit soir or "small night" and is the formal recognition of the first yearers' acceptance into the Corps of Cadets. At the end of the first year, the cadets are presented with the Casoar (the red and white plumes on their shakos) and with their officers' uniform swords. This is the grand soir or "big night". At the end of the second year, cadets are officially commissioned second lieutenants. This is celebrated in the "baptism" (baptême) of the class, a ceremony in which every cadet receives the accolade from a senior officer and the historical gold coloured dress uniform epaulettes of second lieutenants of their chosen specialty branches. At the end of the third and final year, the cadets are promoted to the rank of lieutenant and receive their new insignia in a ceremony called the "triumph" (triomphe). This ceremony is also the time of solemn proclamation of the class name and is the last time the graduates wear the traditional dress uniform of the Corps of Cadets as they march out of the school's grounds one final time.

=== Re-enactment ===
Using authentic battle gear and uniforms of the period, re-enactments of famous battles and ceremonies are regularly staged. The most famous of these is the Battle of Austerlitz, which took place on 2 December 1805 and has been celebrated ever since. 2 December, nicknamed "2S" by the Saint-Cyr cadets, is the date of many Saint-Cyr related celebrations in the Army proper or among the alumni associations made up of graduates of the school.

== Admittance ==
Cadets are recruited through a national annual competitive exam, after previous tertiary education. French students take exams on general knowledge, aptitude and intelligence; sit for an interview and pass a test of physical ability.

- Standard test (concours sur épreuves) : Recruitment occurs after two years of classes préparatoires aux grandes écoles, like most other French Grandes écoles, or a three-year license in a university. The exams propose optional pathways. Maths/science was traditionally the preferred entrance path but today economics and philosophy/literature are also common.
- Interview and record exam (concours sur titres) : These saint-cyriens are recruited after graduate education (master's degree). They will follow only the last year of Saint-Cyr training.

In addition, a number of foreign students are admitted annually.

== Training ==
As all officers obtain a college major upon graduation, military and leadership education is nested with academic instruction. The course is three years long and covers academic training, military strategy and theory, practice of war, training, physical training and leadership and organisational training.

The first-year involves military training and academics. The last two years focus on academics with one to three week breaks for military training. Officer cadets at St-Cyr are commissioned officers following their second year of studies. The cadets attend school from September to July.

Each promotion (class) of the ESM is organised as a battalion and thus the Corps of Cadets is structured as a regiment. The 1st-year students (rank of élève-officier – Cadet) are France's Third Battalion, 2nd-year (rank of aspirant – Officer Designate) are France's Second Battalion and third-year (rank of sous-lieutenant – 2nd Lieutenant) are France's First Battalion and provide thus in parades the lead contingent of the Saint-Cyr complex of military academies. Until 2021, the Reserve Officers, Special Duty Officers and Aspirants trained at the ESM in short sessions served as France's Fourth Battalion.

Upon graduation, cadets are awarded the diploma of Saint-Cyr, which is a master's degree in Strategy and International Relations or Management, or a military degree, depending on their major. Majors are in engineering or science subjects or specialization in classics, modern or ancient history, modern languages, applied modern languages, security, science and economics, law, computer science, physical education, political science or military studies.

Graduates leave the school with the rank of lieutenant and join the specialist school of the branch they select for one additional year of studies, before being assigned to a regiment to serve as a platoon leader.

== Notable alumni ==
- Franco Albrecht (b. 1989): class of 2011, suspected German right-wing terrorist
- Felipe Ángeles (1868–1919): Mexican revolutionary
- Michel Arnaud (1915–1990): class of 1935
- Bahram Aryana (1906–1985): Military Chief of Staff, Iran
- Abdullah Atfeh (1897–1976): Chief of Staff and Minister of Defense of Syria
- Zine El Abidine Ben Ali (1936–2019): President of Tunisia
- Pierre Billotte (1906–1992): class of 1928, French general and politician
- Gabriel Brunet de Sairigné (1913–1948): class of 1933
- Narciso Campero (1813–1896): Military Commander of Bolivia's 5th Division during War of the Pacific, President of Bolivia
- François Certain Canrobert (1809–1895): class of 1828
- Jean Desclaux (1874—1943): graduated in 1896
- Marcel Deslaurens (1883–1940): French general
- Achille Pierre Deffontaines (1858–1914): youngest French general to die in World War I
- Louis Dio (1908–1994): class of 1928, French general
- Louis Franchet d'Espérey (1856–1942): class of 1876
- David Galula (1919–1967): class of 1940
- Charles de Gaulle (1890–1970): class of 1912, President of the French Republic
- Babacar Gaye (b. 1951) : Head of MONUSCO
- Adolphe Guillaumat (1863–1940): class of 1884
- Charles de Foucauld (1858–1916): class of 1876
- Joseph Gallieni (1849–1916)
- Jacques Guillermaz (1911–1998): class of 1937, diplomat, sinologist
- Henri Hay De Slade (1893–1979): flying ace, WWI
- Sardar Homayoun (1850s–1930s)
- Alphonse Juin (1888–1967): class of 1912, Marshal of France
- Manouchehr Khosrodad (1927–1979): commander of Imperial Iranian Army Aviation
- Guillaume Konsbruck (1909–1983): class of 1933, Luxembourgian politician
- Arthur Constantin Krebs (1878–1964)
- Auguste Lahoulle (1891–1959): flying ace, WWI
- François-Henry Laperrine (1860–1920): French general in WWI
- Jean de Lattre de Tassigny (1889–1952): Marshal of France
- Philippe Leclerc de Hauteclocque (1902–1947): class of 1924, Marshal of France
- François Lecointre (b. 1962): class of 1987, Chief of the Defence Staff of the Armies
- Paul Legentilhomme (1884–1975): class of 1907
- Liao Yaoxiang (1903–1968): class of 1936, Chinese general in the Second Sino-Japanese War
- Louis II, Prince of Monaco (1870–1949)
- Hubert Lyautey (1854–1934)
- Patrice MacMahon (1808–1893): class of 1827
- Dragoljub Mihailović: class of 1930
- Philippe Morillon (b. 1935): French general commanding the United Nations Forces in Bosnia (1992–1993) and a Member of the European Parliament until 2009
- Pierre Nord (1900–1985): writer
- Hüseyin Nâzım Paşa (1848–1913): Chief of Staff of the military of the Ottoman Empire
- Aimable Jean Jacques Pélissier (1794–1864)
- Ettore Perrone di San Martino (1789–1849): class of 1806
- Philippe Pétain (1856–1951): Marshal of France
- Peter I of Serbia (1844–1921): King of Serbia (1903–1918); King of Yugoslavia (1918–1921): class of 1862
- Lucien Poirier (1918–2013): class of 1939
- Haj Ali Razmara (1901–1951): Prime Minister of Iran 1950–51
- Michał Rola-Żymierski (1890–1989): class of 1923, first marshal of the Polish People's Republic
- Hélie de Saint Marc (1922–2013)
- Jacques de Sieyes (1891–1949) (a classmate of de Gaulle)
- Francisco Solano López (1827–1870): Paraguayan President and Military Leader during the War of the Triple Alliance
- Joaan bin Hamad bin Khalifa Al Thani (b. 1986): son of the Emir of Qatar
- Jean-Etienne Valluy (1899–1970)
- Maxime Weygand (1867–1965): class of 1897

== See also ==
- Ecole de Guerre-Terre (EDG-T), Paris
- École de guerre (EdG) (School of Warfare)
- École militaire, Paris
- École militaire interarmes (EMIA), Coëtquidan, Brittany
- École supérieure de guerre (1876–1993)
