= École de guerre - Terre =

French military academy

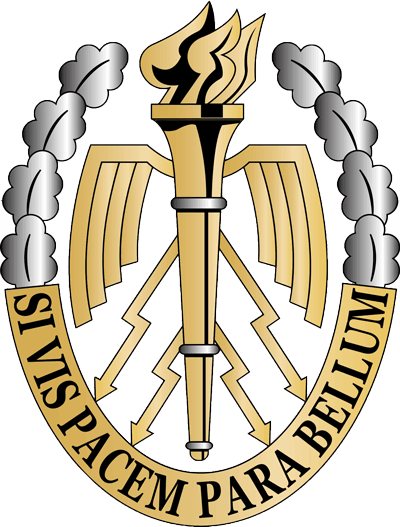
- Logo of École de guerre - Terre
- Type: Staff college
- Established: 1876
- Campus: École militaire, 7th arrondissement of Paris, France
- Website: www.penseemiliterre.fr/edg-t

The École de guerre - Terre (English: Army War College, abbr. EDG-T) is a French staff college that trains the senior officers of French Army. They are recruited through competitive examinations, after the first part of their military career, in which they serve as platoon and company commanders in regiments.

The EDG-T is indeed part of a high-level military education, consisting of staff training, passing the War College (École de guerre / EDG) selective exam, education at the EDG-T, and then at the École de guerre (EdG) ("War College"). The EDG-T was recreated in 2018 and is located inside the walls of the École Militaire, a famous Parisian building facing the Eiffel Tower. It finds its roots in the École supérieure de guerre (ESG), the 136th promotion is currently following schooling.

The nature of the teaching is actually very different EDG, which focuses on joint level operations, whereas EDG-T devotes its teaching to land operations ("on the ground and near the ground").

It was General Bosser's ambition (former Army chief of staff) to train and prepare tomorrow's leaders to an ever-degrading security context. Thus, graduates from the EDG-T must be:

- Experts in the design and conduct of land operations;
- Experts in land engagement environments;
- Experts in the knowledge of the French Army.

== History and traditions ==
=== Heritage of the École Supérieure de Guerre (ESG) (1876–1993) ===
Army training organizations of high-level staff officers since 1876 :
| Class | Appellation | Historical events |
| 1876 (P1-P2) | CSES | Creation of high-level staff course. 2-year schooling. |
| 1878 (P3-P5) | EMS | CSES becomes Superior Military School. 2-year schooling. |
| 1880 (P6-P60) | ESG | EMS becomes École Supérieure de Guerre. 2-year schooling, staff patent. School closed from 1914 to 1919, and in 1939. |
| 1947 (P61-P64) | ESFA, Land section | «Land section», inside the Joint Superior School. 2-year schooling, high-level military education certificate. |
| 1951 (P65 à P106) | ESG | École Supérieure de Guerre. |
| 1993 (P107-P126) | CSEM | High-level staff course. 1-year schooling, including a projection, high-level military education certificate. |
| 2013 (P127-P129) | DESTIA | Direction combined high-level military education. Distance learning |
| 2016 (P130 à P131) | CSIA | Combined warfare superior course. 1-year schooling, including a projection. |
| 2018 (P132 à P136) | EDG-T | École de Guerre-Terre (Army War College) |

The EDG-T finds its roots in the École Supérieure de Guerre (ESG). created in 1876, after the defeat of 1871. This school, whose first commander was General Lewal, aimed to renew tactical education of military elite, following the example of the Prussian method.

Numerous notorious French Army officers have been teaching there, developing a new pedagogy: Major Maillard, Colonel Bonnal, Colonel Lanrezac, General Foch, Colonel Pétain, Colonel Maud'huy and Colonel Debeney. The last three of them (nicknamed as "the pleiad") left a deep print in the history of the school. Their pragmatism as well as their irreverence towards many of their predecessors or contemporary regulations, their concern for analysing the effects of modern weapons, contrasted a lot with the usually more conservative speech of ESG teachers. People considered therefore one could speak of a new school. After World War I, ESG reopened and returned to innovative teaching

World War II interrupted the course for the second time, which resumed only in 1947. In his opening speech, General de Lattre, Inspector General of the Army, urged the trainers to become "brewers of ideas". Two major periods are to be identified. The period from 1947 to 1962 was marked by a dilemma between a future-oriented education and the weight of the past, linked to the everlasting colonial conflicts. After 1962 (end of the Algeria War), the school was deliberately oriented towards the study of nuclear power. General de Gaulle himself explained the students how the atomic power would fashion relationships between France and its allies.

=== Evolution of high-level military education and revival of the EDG-T (1993–2020) ===
Following the Gulf War in 1991, it was chosen to favour the joint character and the strategic level in the training of senior military personnel. The ESG (a 2-year course) has been dissolved and replaced by a 1-year course at the Joint Defence College (College Interarmées de Défense – CID). However, due to the complexity of modern land warfare, the Army decided to maintain a specific teaching prior to the CID. In 1993, a superior general staff course (CSEM) was created to maintain what was taught during the first year of ESG Scholarship. It was divided into two parts: 6 month in a joint staff in operation, and 6 month of schooling. In 2013, a distance education module, further reducing training time of the future military elite, replaced the 6-month course.

In 2016, a superior combined course (CSIA – Cours Supérieur Inter Armes) was eventually recreated on the same basis than the CSEM. In the meantime, the CID was renamed War College (École de Guerre).

In 2018, General Bosser, then Army chief of staff, decided to rename the CSIA as École de Guerre–Terre (Army War College). His ambition was for the trainees "to know war and learn how to conduct it, in order to fight it and win it". Scholarship therefore came back to a 1-year duration. Students now attend lectures, carry out tutorials, participate in tactical several exercises and tactical studies, carry out an individual project, and thus acquire a strategic approach of problems. This training is granted with a certificate awarded by the Army chief of staff to the French and allied officers at the end of the year.

=== Traditions of the EDG-T ===
The Army war college is heir to the École Supérieure de Guerre, from which it took over the flag. In just over a century, nearly 10.000 trainees have passed through its walls.

- After World War I, the School's pennant was decorated with the Legion of Honor from the hands of president Lebrun.
- On March 17, 1955, the war cross with palm was pinned to the pennant. Actually, 124 senior officers, including 23 generals, fell on the various battlefields, in the Resistance or in deportation during World War II.

== Scholarship ==
The total overhaul of teaching carried out in 2018 is based on a new pedagogy and is guided by a double ambition of personalization and openness. It is resolutely oriented towards the involvement and active participation of trainees in the content of their education. In this context, the schooling path is articulated in a two-phases process: the time of transformation and the time of schooling.

=== Transformation ===
The time of transformation begins with success in the War College competitive exam and ends with entry into school. It lasts 21 months. While carrying on activities in their units, laureates receive an individual objective contract, including a projection in operation abroad of 3 to 6 months, development of general culture and military thinking, deepening of professional knowledge and practice of English. They also initiate the subject of a personal project, which will be conducted during second phase of schooling at the EDG-T.

=== Schooling ===
==== Teaching objectives ====
Teaching at the EDG-T amis to develop:

- Aptitude for leadership through development of personal qualities;
- General culture by the construction of a personal frame of thought and understanding of global environment, including civilian and political/ military domain;
- Military culture, by understanding military environment in order to be able to contribute usefully to the development of military thinking;
- Professional culture by the precise knowledge of the military institution, in order to be able to adapt to any kind of job, develop a synthetic state of mind, communicate and collaborate efficiently as part of a staff;
- Technical skills by assimilation of essential knowledge and expertise, in order to conduct any mission.
- The warrior state of mind, through development of perseverance and fighting spirit during numerous scenarios encouraging ability to argue, defend a point of view and take a position.

==== Organization of schooling curriculum ====
EDG-T schooling lasts 33 weeks of core curriculum and 10 weeks of personal project.

It alternates face-to-face teaching at the École Militaire and some working periods to the benefit of the French Army. The teaching seeks to cross themes with geographic approach (5 geographic zones), an approach by levels of command (from battalion level to corps level), enriched by a comparison of approaches from the civilian and the military. The teaching method combines didactic lessons and personal or collective reflections. Every day, a lecture is given to the entire class, previously prepared by each group of students in the classrooms. It is then followed by a perspective session led by the trainees under supervision of each group teacher. Trainees also directly contribute to the life of the Army, by participating in major exercises, carrying out operational reflection committees on subjects of high interest for several Army headquarters. They also respond on short notice to all reinforcement requests from the Army (working groups, operational planning groups, reinforcement of staffs in operations, etc.).

The personal project is freely chosen according to the professional and personal interests of the trainee during the transformation phase. However, it has to meet the needs or concerns of the Army. Conducted autonomously for 10 weeks, it can provide trainees with the chance to work in the Army, in a joint cell, in an inter-ministerial environment, in a university or even in the private sector. Each officer benefits from the support of a tutor who plays the role of adviser and facilitator. This personal project culminates in a dissertation presented at the end of schooling in front of a jury.

== Notable people ==
On July 14, 1919, out of the four marshals or future marshals to have paraded under the Arc de Triomphe, there were three former teachers of the ESG. This shows the weight of the school's teaching staff in the high command, which is truly innervated. It is clear that, before the war, an assignment as a professor at the ESG generally meant that his career was promising. These are some of the famous teachers who have passed through the school's halls:

- General Maillard, from 1884 to 1890
- Marshal Émile Fayolle, from 1897 to 1908
- General Charles Lanrezac, from 1892 to 1898
- General Louis de Maud'huy, from 1903 to 1910
- General Vanbremeerch, from 1968 to 1970
- President Mamady Doumbouya from 2021 to Incumbent

== The 136th class ==
Entering schooling in August 2022, the 136th class counts 83 French officers, 13 allied officers and 26 civilian auditors. The average age of the trainees is 36 years old. All operational functions are represented. Most of the trainees will join the non-Army laureates at the War College by summer 2023; some will study abroad.

== See also ==
- École de Guerre
- École Supérieure de Guerre
- Centre des hautes études militaires
