= Coëtquidan =

French military academy

Coordinates: 47.941894°N 2.134963°W

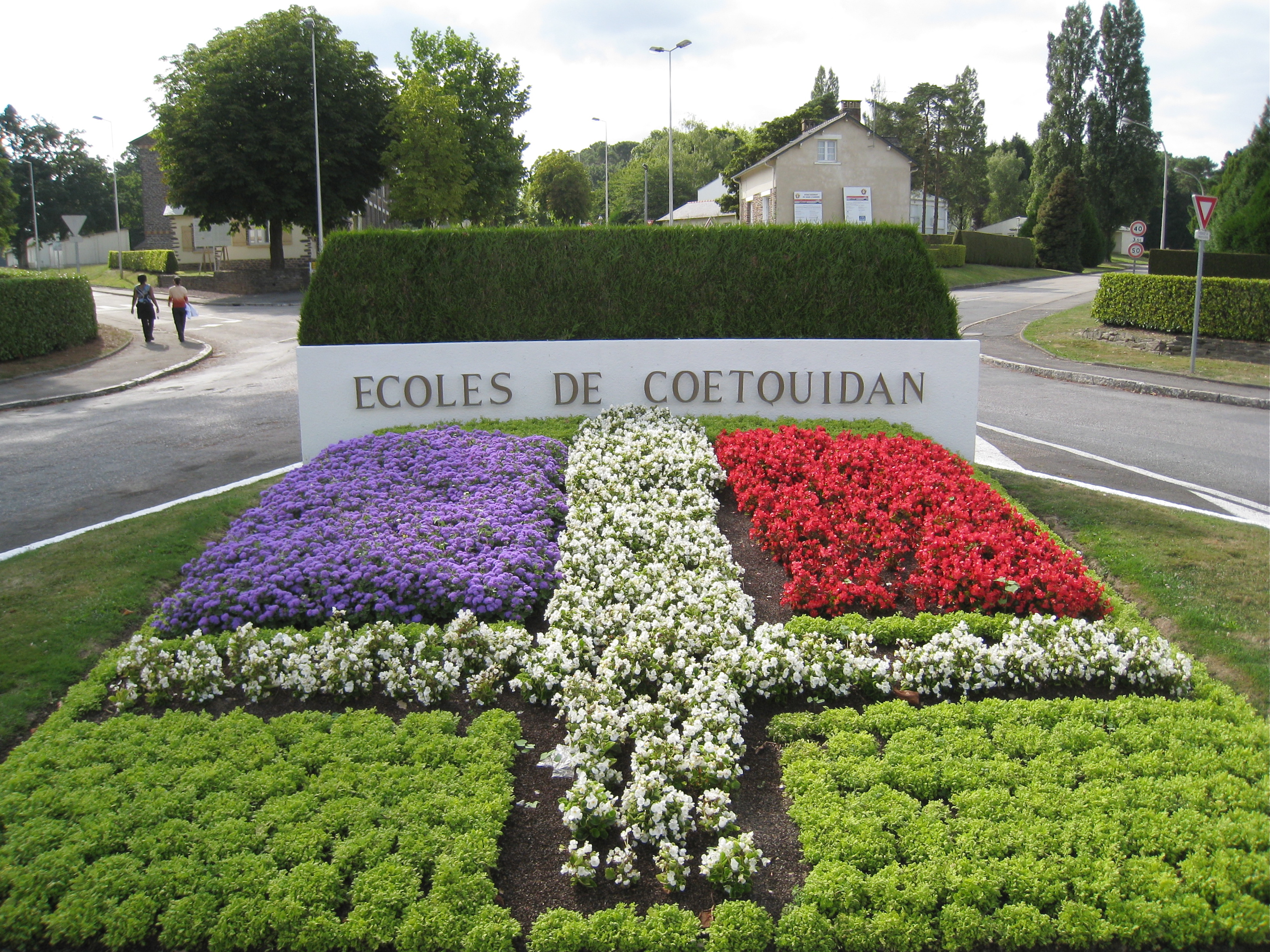
Entrance of Camp Coëtquidan

Académie militaire de Saint-Cyr Coëtquidan (French pronunciation: [akademi militɛʁ də sɛ̃ siʁ kwɛtkidɑ̃], lit. 'Military Academy of Saint-Cyr Coëtquidan', abbr. AMSCC) is a French military educational facility located in the Morbihan department of Brittany in France. It forms a part of the commune of Guer and covers an area of approximately 64 km^{2}.

Logo of Coëtquidan

It comprises:

- École spéciale militaire de Saint-Cyr (ESM)
- École militaire interarmes (EMIA) (combined arms school)
- École militaire des aspirants de Coëtquidan (EMAC)

== World War I ==
Beginning in June–July 1917 the camp was temporarily transferred to the American Expeditionary Forces for use as an artillery training center. Field artillery brigades trained there included the 3rd (3rd Division), 51st (26th Division), 55th (30th Division), 56th (31st Division), 57th (32nd Division), 60th (35th Division), 61st (36th Division), 64th (39th Division), 67th (42nd Division), 158th (83rd Division), and the 160th (85th Division).

== World War II ==
During the war, Coëtquidan was the main army camp used by the Polish Army formed on French soil in September 1939. It furnished the Polish Independent Highland Rifle Brigade that operated in Norway and then briefly in Brittany under General Bohusz-Szyszko in April–June 1940. It also furnished the 1st Grenadier Division that operated on the Lorraine front under General Duch in May–June 1940. In addition it began the training of armoured units that would be sent to the Bollène area in the south of France before being used to form the 10th Armoured Cavalry Brigade that operated in the Marne–Côte-d’Or area under General Maczek in June 1940.
