= Raphaël Vienot =

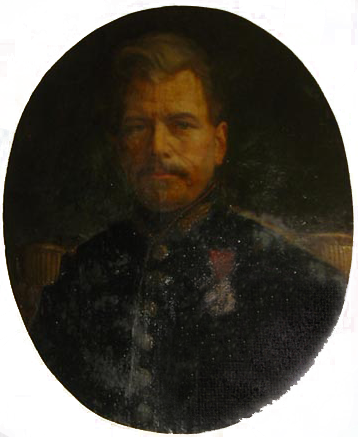
- Portrait of colonel Vienot
- Born: 31 August 1804; France
- Died: 2 May 1855 (aged 50); Sevastopol; Mort au combat
- Military career
- Allegiance: France
- Branch: French Army; French Foreign Legion
- Service years: 1823 - 1855
- Rank: Colonel
- Commands: 1st Regiment of the 1st Foreign Legion 1^{er} R.E.L.E
- Conflicts: Crimean War (French: Guerre de Crimée): Siege of Sevastopol (French: Siège de Sebastopol)

Raphaël Vienot (31 August 1804 – 2 May 1855) was colonel of the French Army who particularly illustrated himself during the Crimean War and was killed in action while leading the assault of his regiment. He is the patron of a promotion at the (Corniche brutionne).

== Military career ==
Born in Fontainebleau in 1804, Raphaël Vienot was admitted to the École spéciale militaire de Saint-Cyr in 1823, after nine years of studies at the Prytanée National Militaire (French: Prytanée Militaire) of La Flèche. He graduated as a sous-lieutenant and was assigned to the 4th Line Infantry Regiment (French: 4^{e} Régiment d'Infanterie de Ligne) where he served for more than twenty years.

In 1846, Vienot was designated as chef de bataillon at the 20th Light Infantry Regiment (French: 20^{e}Régiment d'Infanterie Légère). In 1852 he joined the 1st Foreign Regiment 1^{er} RE of the French Foreign Legion, with the rank of lieutenant-colonel .

On 5 September 1854, during the Crimean War (French: Guerre de Crimée), Vienot was appointed regimental commander. During April 1855, he led a vigorous attack by French and allied troops on the fortified works outside Sevastopol (French: Sebastopol).

During the night of 1–2 May 1855 Vienot launched an assault with his regiment on Fort (French: Redoute) Schwartz. The Russian defenders were overcome by the legionnaires, but Colonel Viénot was shot in the forehead while leading his men. During this assault fourteen of the eighteen legion officers involved were also killed in action.

Vienot was the second regimental commander of the French Foreign Legion to be killed in action while at the head of his men; after Colonel Conrad.

== Posterity ==
His name was given a couple of years after his death to the main garrison quarter of the Legion (French: Maison mère de la Légion) at Sidi Bel Abbès in French Algeria then in 1962, to the modern base of the 1st Foreign Regiment 1^{er} RE, at Aubagne in France.

He was chosen as the patron for the 2006-2008 promotion (graduation class) of St Cyr: Corniche Brutionne.

== See also ==
- Origins of the French Foreign Legion
- Marie Louis Henry de Granet-Lacroix de Chabrières
- Patrice de MacMahon, Duke of Magenta
- François Certain Canrobert
- François Achille Bazaine
- French Foreign Legion Music Band (MLE)
