= Jean-Luc Carbuccia =

- Born: 1808; Bastia
- Died: 17 June 1854 (aged 46)
- Military career
- Allegiance: France
- Branch: French Army; French Foreign Legion
- Rank: Général
- Commands: 2nd Foreign Legion Regiment; 2^{ème} R.E.L.E (1848–1851)

Jean-Luc Sébastien Bonaventure Carbuccia (1808 – 17 June 1854) was a French general and archaeologist.

== Early life ==
Carbuccia was born in Bastia in 1808. His family; and old Corsican Family, related to Mozer de Mattéï; left for France, preferring exile over servitude of the Genovese. His Grand-Father and Father illustrated themselves at the corps of the « Royal Corsican Regiment » (French: Régiment Royal Corse) where numerous notable exiles served.

== Military career ==
He entered into Saint-Cyr in 1825 and was commissioned a Sous-lieutenant two years later. Present at the disembarking of the expeditionary corps of Algeria in 1830, he partook to all combats since the beginning of the conquest: disembarking of the expeditionary corps at Sidi-Ferruch, at the sieges of the Fort of the Emperor and Oran. He returned to France six years later with the rank of Captain. In 1839, he redeployed to Algeria based on his demand. Three wounds, four citations and the Knight Cross Order of the Legion d'Honneur testified of his qualities of a soldier. He equally won the Esteem of The Duke of Aumale and Marshal Thomas Robert Bugeaud, governor of Algeria.

Colonel at the age of 40, he succeeded to Colonel Count de Noue on August 31, 1848, at the head of the 2nd Foreign Legion Regiment 2^{ème} R.E.L.E in Algeria and to Colonel de Canrobert to the subdivision of Batna. He received the first Flag (regimental colors) of the Regiment. Particularly appreciated by his men, he commanded a blind obedience. He illustrated himself while leading them, notably during the Siege of Zaatcha.

In 1854, nominated to Général, he was assigned to Paris. However, the Crimean War commenced and he requested to be sent. He participated at the head of the brigade of the French Foreign Legion. After the funeral of général d’Elchingen, who died from cholera suddenly, he returned to his domicile tired. The next day, on July 17, 1854, contaminated as well, he died in a couple of hours, at the age of 46, in front of Gallipoli.

== The Archaeologist ==
In addition to being a grand military chief, Général Carbuccia (colonel at the époque) was an Archaeology enthusiast. Under his orders, his regiment, the 2nd Foreign Regiment commenced the various campaign operations of digging, clearing, excavating, recovering, protecting and preserving the Ancient Roman City of Lambaesis. This Ancient City was the military Capital of Roman Numidia. Colonel Carbuccia reconstituted accordingly in recovery the entire geography of the Ancient Roman Province.

From the various excavations of the Lambaesis Ruins, he commissioned a report entitled " « Archeology of the Subdivision of Batna » " (French: « Archéologie de la subdivision de Batna »). He was received by the Académie des Inscriptions et Belles-Lettres. The report is actually conserved by the Library Institute of France (French: « Bibliothèque de l'Institut de France »). Rewarded with a satisfaction medal, Carbuccia would only accept it for his regiment.

He was the author of:

« Description des ruines situées sur la route suivie par la colonne du général de Saint Arnaud, mai-juin 1850 dans les Nemenchas et dans l’Aurès »
("Description of the Ruins situated on the route followed by the column of général de Saint Arnaud, May–June 1850 in the Nemenchas and in the Aurès").

== See also ==
- Origins of the French Foreign Legion
- Marie Louis Henry de Granet-Lacroix de Chabrières
- Patrice de MacMahon, Duke of Magenta
