= Army of the East =

Army of the East may refer to:

- Armée de l'Est, a French army active during the Franco-Prussian war
- Eastern Army (Spain), also translated as the Army of the East; active during the Spanish Civil War
- Armée d'Orient (disambiguation), a number of historic units in the French army
- Jaych al-Charkiya, rebel group formed in 2017 during the Syrian civil war
