= François Certain de Canrobert =

Marshal of France (1809–1895)

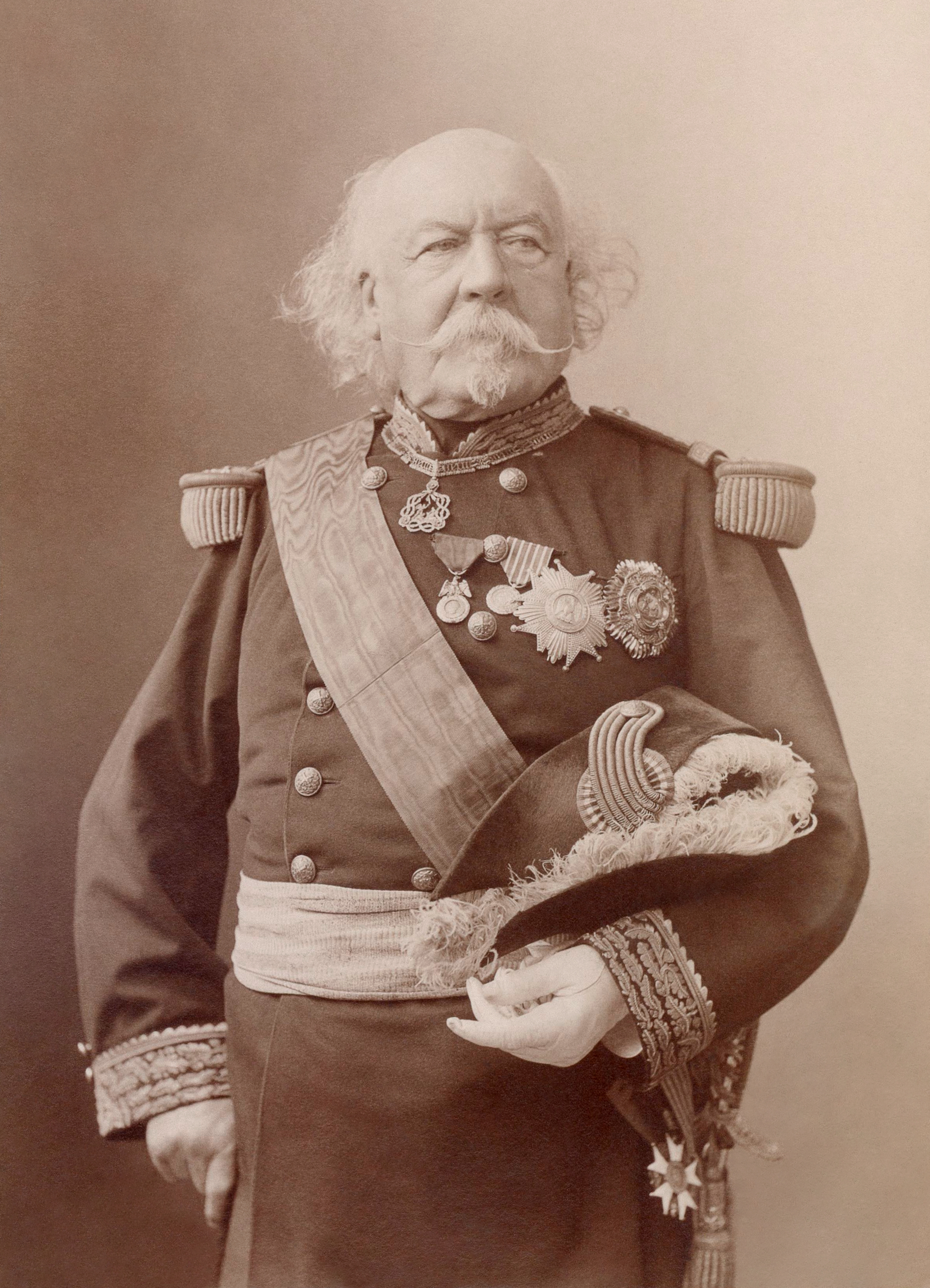
- François Certain de Canrobert photographed by Nadar
- Born: 27 June 1809; Saint-Céré, France
- Died: 28 January 1895 (aged 85); Paris, France
- Military career
- Allegiance: Bourbon Restoration; July Monarchy; French Second Republic; Second French Empire; French Third Republic
- Branch: French Army; Line Infantry
- Service years: 1828–1873
- Rank: Maréchal de France
- Nicknames: Doyen of Marshals; Doyen des Maréchaux
- Commands: Subdivision of Batna; 2nd Foreign Legion Regiment; 2^{ème} R.E.L.E (1848); VI Army Corps, Army of the Rhine (1870)
- Conflicts: Conquest of Algeria; Crimean War; Franco-Prussian War
- Other work: Military governor of Paris (1865–1870); Senator of Lot (1876); Senator of Charente (1879)

François Marcellin Certain de Canrobert (English: /kænroʊˈbɛər/ kan-roh-BAIR, French: [fʁɑ̃swa maʁsəlɛ̃ sɛʁtɛ̃ də kɑ̃ʁɔbɛʁ]; born François Certain Canrobert; 27 June 1809 – 28 January 1895) was a French Marshal. He demonstrated ability during the Second French Empire while participating in the Battle of the Alma, the Battle of Magenta, the Battle of Solferino and the Battle of Gravelotte. A staunch supporter of Napoleon III, he became, under the French Third Republic, one of the leading figures in the Bonapartist party and chairman, from 1876 to 1894, of the Senate within the French parliamentary group Appel au peuple.

== Biography ==
=== Family background ===
François Certain de Canrobert was born in Saint-Céré in Lot, where a statue (1897) in his effigy was erected in place de la République by Alfred Lenoir.

At his birth, his father, Antoine Certain Canrobert, a former captain, was already 55 years old. This officer of the Ancien régime had emigrated in 1791 and served against the French republic in the Armée de Condé. His half-brother, Antoine, a brilliant officer and graduate of Saint-Cyr, was killed by a cannonball at the Battle of Ligny on 16 June 1815, while fighting for Emperor Napoleon I.

Through his father's sister, Marie-Louise, François Certain de Canrobert was the cousin of Adolphe and Marcellin Marbot, who became respectively maréchal de camp (brigadier general) and lieutenant-général (divisional general) during the July Monarchy of 1830–1848.

=== Early military career ===
On 19 November 1826, aged 17, Canrobert entered the École Royale spéciale militaire de Saint-Cyr where he was designated as a corporal on 18 May 1828. At his graduation, he was posted to the 47th Line Infantry Regiment (French: 47^{e} Régiment d'Infanterie de Ligne) (RIL), with the rank of sous-lieutenant starting 1 October. He served until 1840 and was promoted to lieutenant on 20 January 1832.

=== North Africa ===
In 1835 he arrived with his unit in Algeria, where he engaged in combat on the edges of Oued Sig and Habra. In 1836 he fought in actions at Dar el Achen, Tafna, Sidi Yacoub, La Silal and Bet el Laham.

He was designated as lieutenant adjudant major on 28 September 1836. On 26 April 1837 he was promoted to captain adjudant major. He took part in the combat of Medjeoly-Amar and the Siege of Constantine where, as an assistant to colonel Michel Combes (French: Combes), he was wounded. At the age of 27, Canrobert earned the Knight Cross of the Legion d'honneur.

He was assigned to the 6th Chasseurs Battalion à Pied (French: 6^{e} Bataillon), on 17 October 1840. He took part in the battle of col de Mouzaïa in 1840 (French: col de la Mouzaïa). In the following year, he participated in actions at de Nador, de Moursia and confronted the Flittas. Designated as commandant-major on 22 May 1842, he joined the 13th Light Infantry Regiment (French: 13^{e} Régiment d'Infanterie Légère). On 16 October he transferred to the 5th Chasseurs Battalion à Pied (French: 5^{e} Bataillon de Chasseurs à Pied), where he gained the Officer Order of the Legion d'honneur while demonstrating combat capability at Gontas, Baal, Tadjena, Battle of Sidi Brahim, then near Oued Lemig, during the combat Isly and at Riou.

Promoted to lieutenant-colonel on 26 October 1845, he was assigned to the 16th Line Infantry Regiment (French: 16^{e} RIL) on 4 September. On 8 June 1847 he was assigned to the 2nd Line Infantry Regiment (French: 2^{e} RIL) and commanded the subdivision of Batna.

=== Transfer to the Legion ===
Promoted to colonel, on 8 November, he was assigned to the 78th Line Infantry Regiment (French: 3^{e} Régiment d'Infanterie Légère), which he left on 31 March 1848 to take up the functions of regimental commander of the 2nd Foreign Legion Regiment 2^{ème} R.E.L.E, while simultaneously maintaining the subdivision of Batna. With this unit, he took on Ahmed Bey.

In June he substituted for colonel Jean-François de Cariés de Senilhes (French: Cariés de Senilhes) and took command of the 3rd Zouaves Regiment (French: 3^{e} Régiment de Zouaves) and the subdivision of Sour El-Ghozlane. In 1849 he was in Beni Mélikech, Sameur, Al Amri. Then he commanded at the battle of Zaatcha (French: siège de Zaatcha), earning the Commander Neck Order of the Legion d'honneur on 10 December.

=== General of the Second Empire ===
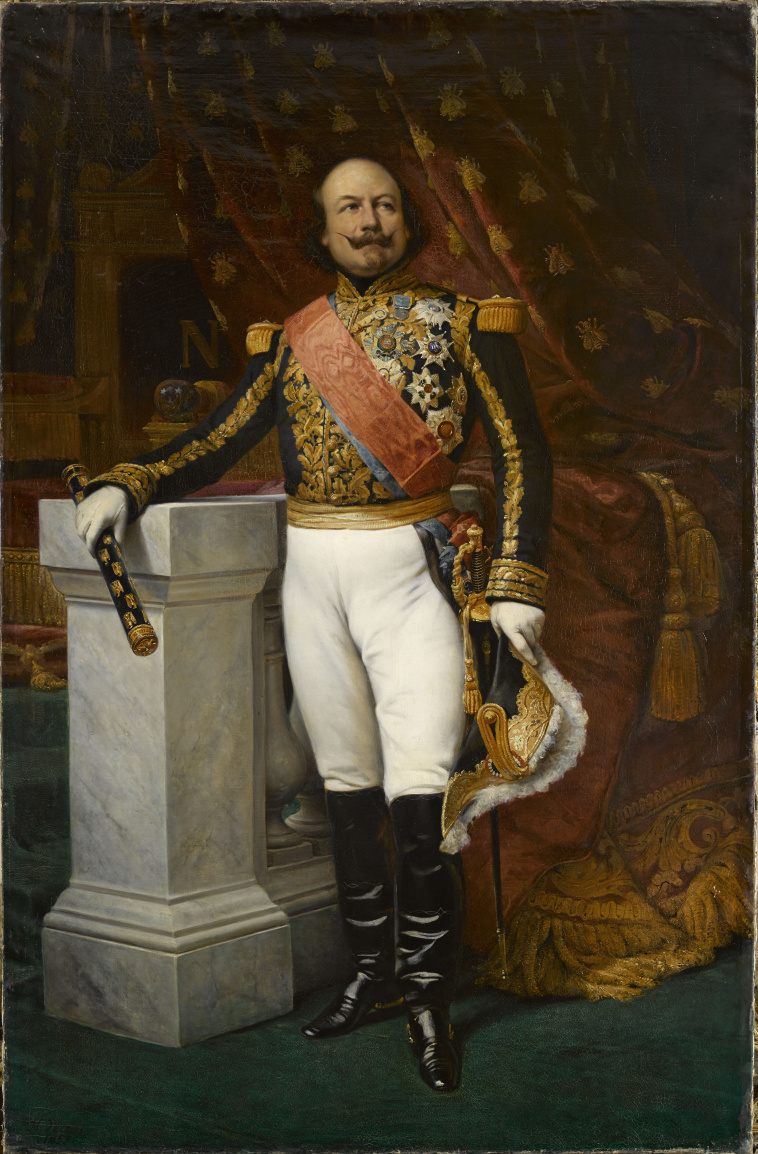
Portrait of Marshal Canrobert by Horace Vernet, 1857. Maréchal de camp François Certain de Canrobert in the Palace of Versailles.

Recalled to France by the Prince-President Louis-Napoléon Bonaparte, he was designated as maréchal de camp (brigadier general) starting 12 January 1850. He was nominated as commandant of the infantry brigade of the 1st Division of Paris, on 8 March 1850, then to the command of the 3rd Brigade on 9 February 1851; he contributed to the success in Paris of the French coup d'état of 1851. In the afternoon of 4 December 1851, on the Boulevards Montmarte and Poissonnière, the soldiers of the Division commanded by Canrobert came into contact with a crowd formed of the curious and protestors. In a certain confusion, the soldiers opened fire, causing 100–300 deaths and hundreds of wounded. On the night of 4 December the Parisian resistance to the coup collapsed, with 300 to 400 civilians killed. While two-thirds of the protestors comprised workers, amongst them also featured the innocent and curious, victims of the division of Canrobert on the grand boulevards. In all of France, 26,884 people were arrested, essentially in the South-East, the South-West and a couple of departments in the Center. Almost 21,000 people were condemned by mixed commissions (composed in each department by prefects, a general, and a magistrate) out of which 9,530 ended in transportation to Algeria and 239 were sent to Cayenne in Guiana. On the other hand and quite quickly, all pronounced repression measures declared by the 82 mixed commissions worried President Louis-Napoléon Bonaparte, who delegated in extraordinary mission, generals Canrobert, Espinasse, and State Council Quentin Bauchart, in order to revise the arrest decisions taken and to prepare acts of grâce (forgiving the condemned by mercy). Espinasse and Canrobert, placed in charge of the South-West and Languedoc, showed little indulgence towards the condemned, they both accorded a little more than a thousand acts of forgiveness, while State Counselor Quentin-Bauchart, charged with the South-East, accorded alone 3,400 forgiveness sentences, while Louis-Napoléon Bonaparte in his own right forgave numerous condemnations.

Following these events Canrobert gained the function of aide-de-camp to the Prince-President, and later to the Emperor. Promoted to divisional general on 14 January 1853, he commanded the infantry division at camp Helfaut-Saint Omer, as of 27 April. In May he became the inspector general of the 5th Infantry Arrondissement for the year 1853 before being designated to the infantry division of the Orient Army on 23 February 1854.

=== Crimea ===
Oriental Army of the Crimean campaign by Gustav Bartsch. From left to right: Admiral Ferdinand-Alphonse Hamelin, Lord Lucan, Lord Raglan, Admiral Dundas, Sir John Campbell, Duke of Cambridge, Lord Cardigan, Ismail Pasha, Omer Pasha, Muhlis Pasha (Grigore Sturdza), Sultan Abdülmecid I, Said-Bey (Vasile Obedeanu), Ahmed Pasha, col. Desmaret, Marshal Baraguey d'Hilliers, Prince Napoleon, col. Trochu, Marshal de Saint-Arnaud, general Bosquet, general de Canrobert

As divisional general, he participated to the Crimean War of 1853–1856 and became commander in chief after Marshal Saint-Arnaud, who died in September 1854. He took part in action at Dobruja (July 1854) and in the Battle of the Alma (20 September 1854), where he was slightly wounded. He was elevated to the Grand Officer Order of the Legion d'honneur on 1 October. Present at the Battle of Balaclava (25 October 1854) and the Battle of Inkerman, he was wounded during the course of the latter, on 5 November 1854. He was accordingly promoted to the Order of the Grand-Croix of the Légion d'honneur. On 13 January 1855, he received the Medaille Militaire.

Judged too timorous, he was relieved by general Aimable Pélissier (16 May 1855). He accordingly reassumed command of his former division, which became the 1st Infantry Division of the 2nd Corps. This situation having become difficult, Napoleon III insisted that Canrobert return to France. After several refusals, in August 1855 Canrobert returned to Paris to take up his functions as aide-de-camp.

His disputes with Lord Raglan, general of the British Army, obliged him to relinquish his command. On 18 March 1856, he was elevated to the dignity of Marshal of France.

=== Italy ===
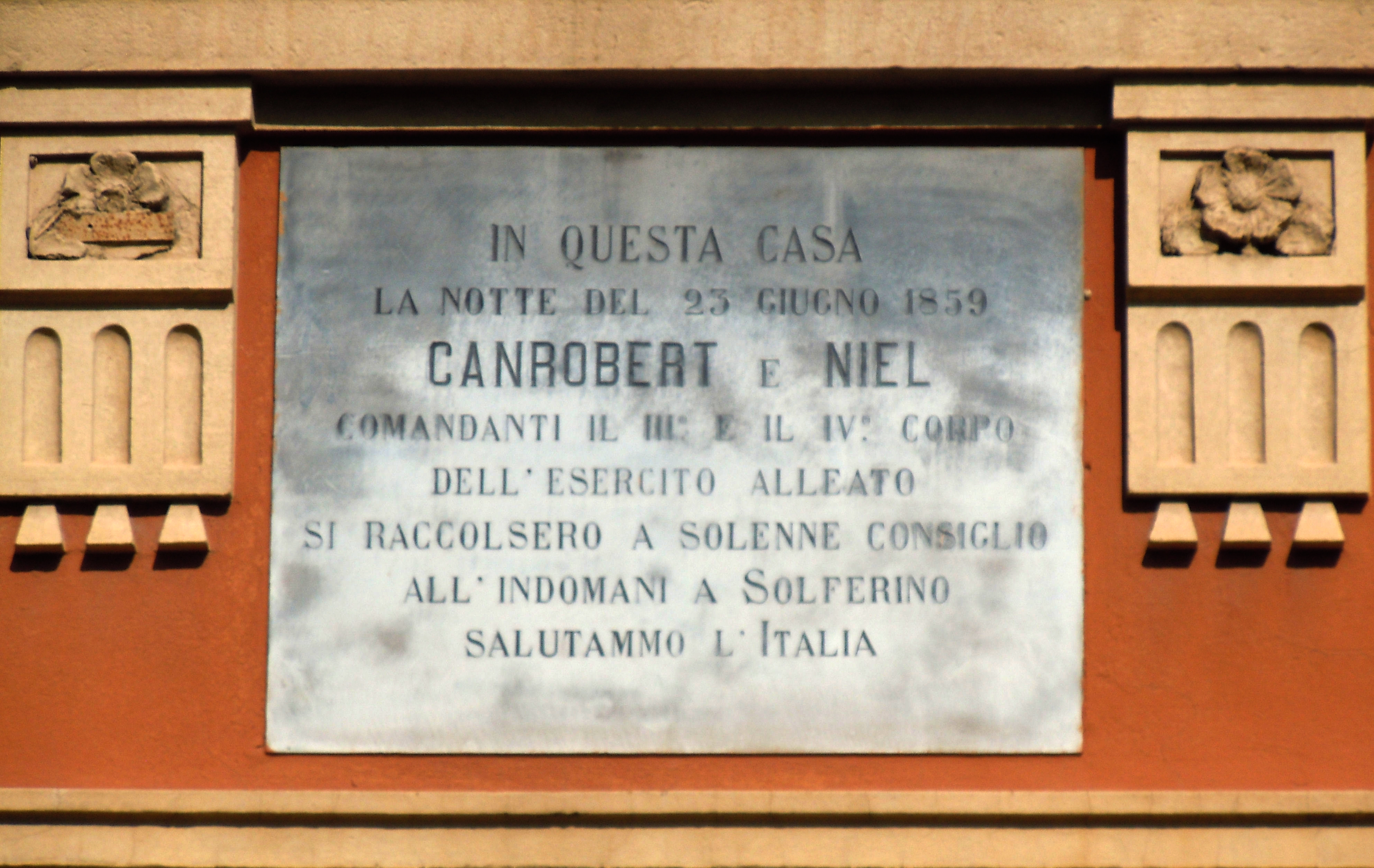
Commemorative plaque honouring François Certain de Canrobert and Adolphe Niel in Carpenedolo.

In February 1858 he commanded the division of the East at Nancy, then the Camp de Châlons, starting from 1 June 1858. On 22 April 1859 he received the command of the 3rd Army Corps of the Alpes and participated in the Second Italian War of Independence from April to July, passing by Turin, Dorial, Balba, Magenta and Solferino. He distinguished himself during the Battle of Magenta (4 June 1859) and was a major contributor to the victory at the Battle of Solferino on 24 June 1859.

=== France ===
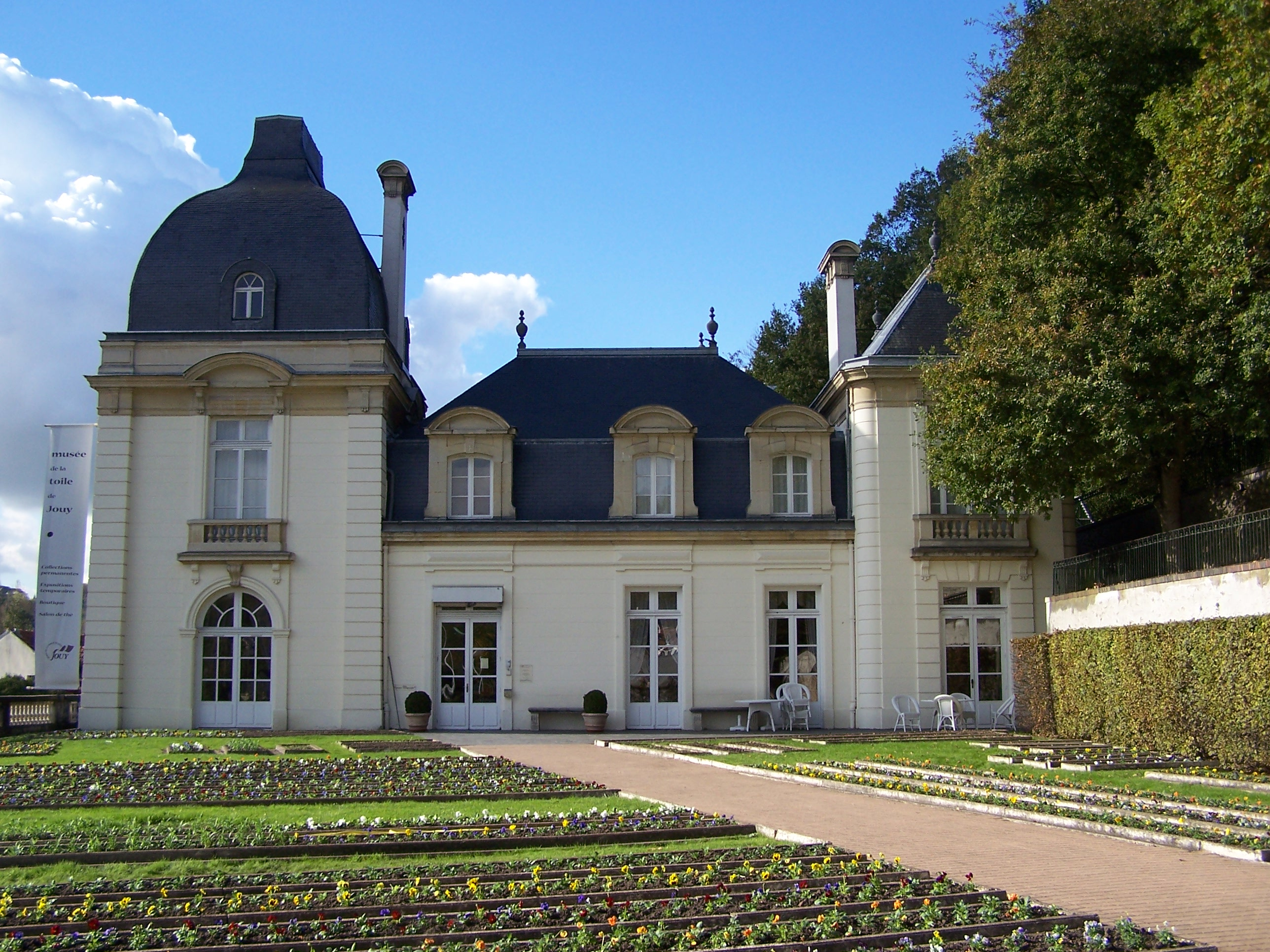
The Eglantine Castle, built in the middle of the 19th century by Marshal Canrobert.

He then joined the garrison at Nancy with his army corps. He became commandant of the 3rd Military Arrondissement at Nancy, on 27 August. In 1862 he commanded the troops of the Camp de Châlons, then took command of the 4th Army Corps at Lyon, starting in October. On 22 June 1856 he commanded the 1st Army Corps of the 1st Military Division of Paris.

=== 1870–1871 ===
Following the outbreak of the Franco-Prussian War on 19 July 1870, on 12 August 1870, Canrobert declined to take command of the Army of the Rhine, petrified by the responsibilities which would ensue. Abandoning the post to Bazaine, Canrobert became an obedient subordinate. He took part in the battles of Sainte-Barbe, Noisseville and Landonchamps. On 16/18 August, he commanded the 6th Army Corps and demonstrated distinguished capability at Saint-Privat where he shook three corps of Général von Steinmetz and decimated the 1st Infantry Regiment of the Prussian Guard. However, due to a mistake in the supply of ammunition and reinforcements, he abandoned his position. He was made prisoner – with Marshal Bazaine – during the surrender of Metz on 28 October 1870. Following several months in captivity, he was liberated and returned to France in March 1871.

== End of his military career and political career ==
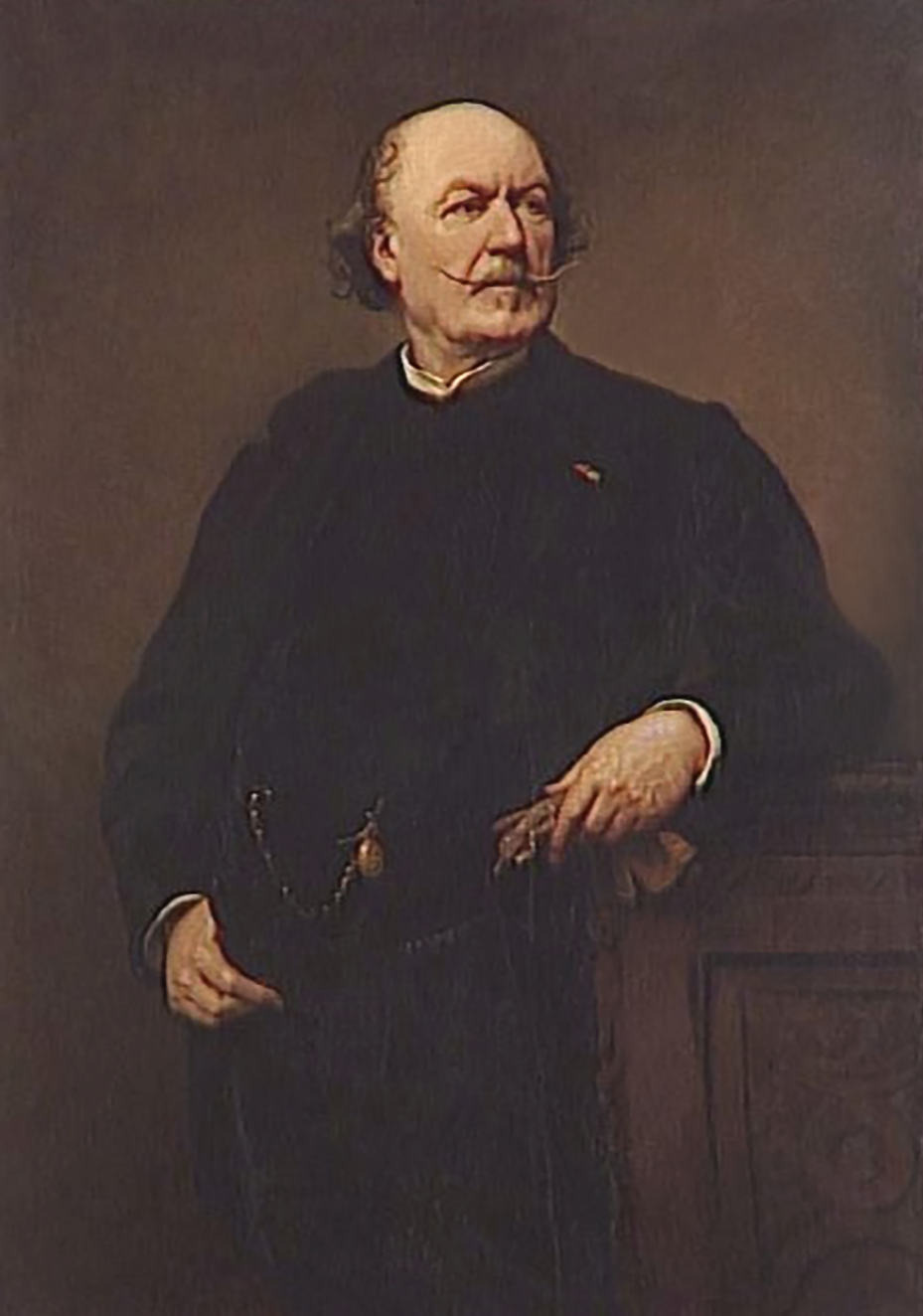
Formal Portrait of Marshal de Canrobert by Nélie Jacquemart (1870).

He was then named President of the infantry promotion commission, a member of the Conseil supérieur de la guerre in 1872, and a member of the defense committee in 1873. He led a political career in the Bonapartist Appel au peuple, being elected Senator for Lot in 1876 and for Charente in 1879, a function which he held until 1894. His senate colleague Victor Hugo would not be tender for him: J'ai vu Canrobert au Sénat. Caboche de reître. Méchant, mais bête (Victor Hugo: "I saw Canrobert in the Senate. Roughneck soldier's head. Mean, but thick).

Close to President-Marshal Duke de Mac Mahon, he voted for the June 1877 dissolution of the Chamber and supported the short-lived Government of Albert de Broglie. In 1873, he represented the French Government at the funeral of King Victor Emmanuel II. A well-known figure of the Bonapartist Party, his participation in the political debates was mainly focused on military issues. He generally voted on the conservative side, most notably against bills on education, against judicial reforms, against the expulsion of the princes and against divorce, abstaining on the return to voting by district and on the press freedom restriction bill.

Doyen of the Marshals of France of his time, he attended the funeral of President-Marshal Duke de Mac-Mahon and was saluted by Russian Admiral Theodor Avellan on behalf of the Russian Emperor. This was his last public official appearance. He died in his Parisian home, on 28 January 1895. His funeral was celebrated on Sunday, 3 February 1895, at the Church of Saint-Louis-des-Invalides where he was buried. Admiral Henri Rieunier, Minister of the Navy, was designated to hold one of the five cordons of the funeral chariot.

He owned the Eglantine Castle in Jouy-en-Josas, which since 1991 houses the Musée de la toile de Jouy.

== Honors and posterity ==
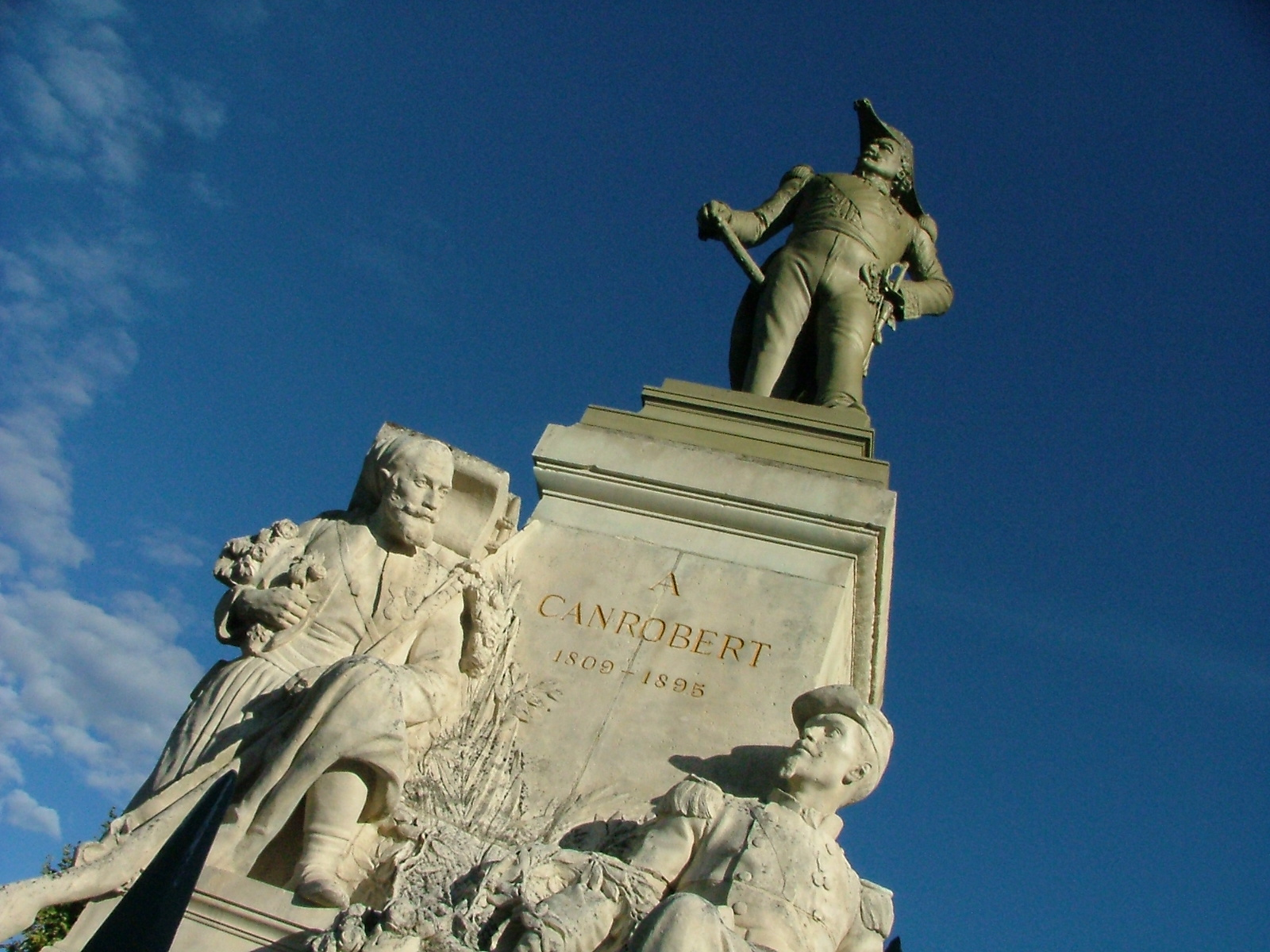
Alfred Lenoir, details of the Statue of Marshal Canrobert (1897) at Saint-Céré.

The name of Canrobert was given to:

- From 1872 to 1956, the village of Ange-Gardien, in the comté de Rouville, in Quebec; a rang of the municipality commemorates still the Battle of Magenta, where he distinguished himself;
- A garrison at Pontoise, then the area lot of the Pontoise station and the street that serves it;
- The place in the village of Saint-Privat-la-Montagne, near the cemetery in which the battle took place;
- A city in the Constantine Department created in 1904, today Oum El Bouaghi Province;
- The garrison of the 42nd Transmission Regiment at Rastatt in Germany;
- A road in the commune of Nœux-les-Mines, Pas-de-Calais;
- Support point Canrobert / Horimont-Stellung (1912–1916), north of the Group Fortification Lorraine.

== Decorations ==
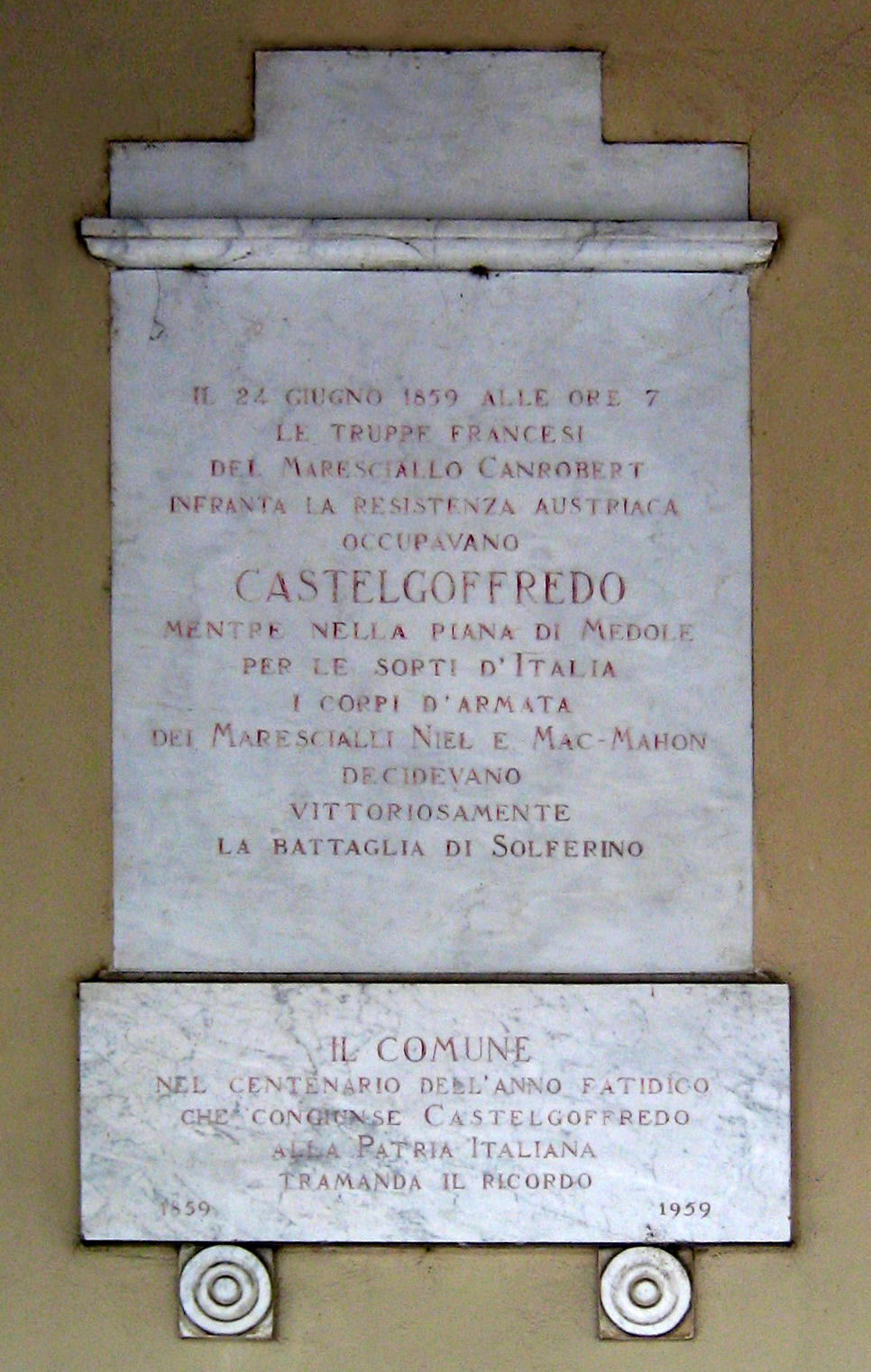
Commemorative plaque honouring François Certain de Canrobert in Castel Goffredo.

- Kingdom of France:
  - Knight of the Légion d'honneur, 1837; Officer, 1843; Commander, 1849; Grand Officer, 1854; Grand Cross, 1855.
  - Médaille militaire, 13 January 1855.
  - Commemorative medal of the 1859 Italian Campaign.
- United Kingdom:
  - Grand Cross of the Order of the Bath (Honorary), 5 September 1855.
  - Crimea Medal.
- Sweden-Norway: Knight of the Order of the Seraphim, 17 November 1855.
- Denmark: Knight of the Order of the Elephant, 28 November 1855.
- Kingdom of Sardinia:
  - Knight of the Supreme Order of the Most Holy Annunciation, 5 August 1857.
  - Grand-Croix of the Military Order of Savoy, 16 November 1857.
  - Sardinian Cross of Military Valor, 1860.
- Kingdom of Prussia: Knight of the Order of the Black Eagle, 12 June 1867.
- Ottoman Empire: Order of the Medjidie, 1st Class.
- Russian Empire: Knight of the Order of St. Andrew.

== See also ==
- Origins of the French Foreign Legion
- Marie Louis Henry de Granet-Lacroix de Chabrières
- Jean-Luc Carbuccia
