= 1st Foreign Regiment (France) =

1st Foreign regiment
- 1^{e} Régiment étranger
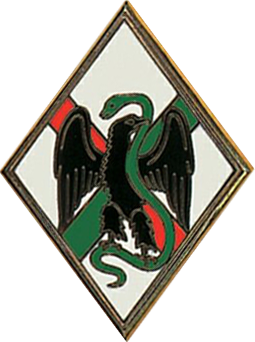
- Regimental badge of 1er RE
- Active: 1841–present
- Country: France
- Branch: French Army
- Type: Foreign Legion
- Role: Music of the Legion; IILE; Museum of the Legion
- Size: ~600
- Part of: Foreign Legion Command
- Garrison/HQ: Aubagne
- Motto: Honneur et Fidélité
- Colors: Green & Red
- March: Nous sommes tous des volontaires (We are all volunteers)
- Anniversaries: Camerone Day (April 30) and Christmas
- Engagements: Crimean War: Siege of Sevastopol 1854; Second Italian War of Independence: Battle of Magenta; French intervention in Mexico: Battle of Camarón; World War I Levant Campaign; World War II; Algerian War; Multinational Force in Lebanon Gulf War

Commanders
- Current commander: Lieutenant-colonel Dujon
- Notable commanders: François Achille Bazaine; Raphaël Vienot; Pierre Joseph Jeanningros; Paul-Frédéric Rollet

Insignia
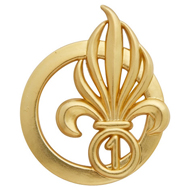
- Beret insignia of the 1st Foreign Regiment
- Abbreviation: 1^{er} RE

The 1st Foreign Regiment (French: 1^{er} Régiment étranger, 1^{er} RE) is a depot regiment of the Foreign Legion in the French Army. It is located at Aubagne.

The regiment is also responsible for running special institutions of the Legion. These include the magazine Képi Blanc, the Legion's Athletics Team (ATHLEG), the Legion Military Band, the Legion Museum and numerous other Legion initiatives.

== History ==
=== Royal Foreign Legion ===
Under the first restoration, the Bourbons only retained the Swiss foreign soldiers, as a mark of their loyal service rendered to France during four centuries, and with them also, four foreign regiments out of which one colonial, formed of Spanish and Portuguese. The eight reorganized foreign regiments by Napoleon at the Hundred Days formed in 1815 the Royal Foreign Legion, which became the Hohenlohe Legion, then in 1821 the Hohenlohe Regiment. Licensed in 1830, the latter contributed to form the twenty first light, then the French Foreign Legion. The Swiss regiments of the restoration disappeared in 1830, nevertheless, the Swiss were reincorporated again in the French Army from 1855 to 1859 under the successive denomination of 2nd Foreign Legion (French: La Deuxième Légion Etrangère) and 1st Foreign Regiment (French: 1^{er} Régiment Etranger).

=== Creation and different nominations ===
- On April 1, 1841 : creation of the 1st Foreign Regiment.
- 1859 : merged with the 2nd Foreign Regiment and became the Foreign Regiment.
- 1875 : became the French Foreign Legion ("Légion étrangère").
- January 1, 1885 : became again the 1st Foreign Regiment.

=== 1st Regiment of the 1st Foreign Legion ===
==== 1st Foreign Regiment of 1885 ====
The 1st Regiment of the Foreign Legion was created in 1841 based on 3 battalions in the newly created 1831 Foreign Legion. The 1st Regiment of the Foreign Legion became in 1855 the 1st Regiment of the 1st Foreign Legion. This regiment merged with the 2nd Foreign Regiment (1856-1861) in 1859 and became the Foreign Regiment (R.E.), (1862-1875), then came the 1st and 2nd battalion of the Foreign Legion, (1875-1884) which produced the 1st Foreign Regiment of 1885 that became the 1st Foreign Infantry Regiment in 1922 and the French: 1^{er} Régiment Etranger d'Infanterie de Marche, 1^{er} R.E.I.M.) in 1943.

=== 1st Foreign Regiment of 1856 ===
The 1st Foreign Regiment (1^{er} R.E.) (1856-1861) was created based on the 1st and 2nd Foreign Regiments of the 2nd Foreign Legion.

=== 1st Foreign Regiment of 1955 ===
The 1st Foreign Regiment (1^{er} R.E) was created based on the recreated 1st Foreign Infantry Regiment (1946-1955). This 1st Foreign Regiment gave formation on September 1, 1972, to the Foreign Legion Groupment (G.L.E) which became the Foreign Legion Command (C.O.M.L.E) on July 1, 1984. With the Foreign Legion Command, the 1st Foreign Regiment is the (French: Maison Mère) of the Foreign Legion. Being the Maison Mère means the regiment preserves tradition and serves as a basis for the entire Legion. Quartier (garrison) Vienot of Aubagne and Sidi Bel Abbès were both named in honor of Colonel Raphaël Vienot. Aubagne also houses the French Foreign Legion Museum.

The 1st Foreign Regiment is a major cornerstone in the career paths of legionnaires. Legionnaires begin their careers at the 1st Foreign Regiment at the selection center of incorporation and confirm successful return upon completion of basic training before deploying to a legion operational regiment. Legionnaires also pass by the 1st Foreign Regiment each time a posting of a regiment changes, and also finalize in the same regiment their departure formalities at the end of active duty service.

==== Missions of the 1st Foreign Regiment ====
The 1st Foreign Regiment is an administrative regiment which major missions are the support of the Foreign Legion and directed by the Foreign Legion Command. However, during exterior and interior mission deployments requirements of units and regiments of the legion; the 1st Foreign Regiment usually also dispatches particular individuals or teams of specialists (O.M.L.T). In addition, the foreign regiment like all regiments of the French Army, does also engage in the alert phase mission of Vigipirate. The 1st Foreign Regiment also dispatches and supports world humanitarian missions around the globe during natural catastrophes and disasters.

== History of the garrisons, campaigns and battles ==
=== 1841 to 1852 ===
The 1st Foreign Regiment 1^{er} was created in Aleria on April 1, 1841, from the first three Legion battalions.

On January 1, 1849, the 1^{er} RE, under the command of Colonel Émile Mellinet (French: Émile Mellinet), was in garrison at Oran in Algeria.

=== Second Empire ===
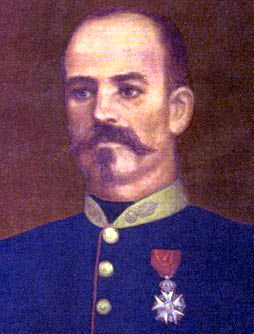
Captain Jean Danjou (Battle of Camarón)

On July 6, 1856, the regiment received the regimental flag colors "Emperor Napoleon III at the 1st Foreign" (French: l'Empereur Napoléon III au 1^{er} Etranger) before initiating the campaign in Kabylie.

The foreign regiment first participated to the pacification of Algeria, then was funneled to the Crimean War where the regiment formed a brigade with the 2nd Foreign Regiment, as part of the 6th Division. The regiment participated to the Battle of Alma, and the Siege of Sevastopol. The regimental commander, colonel Vienot was killed in combat on May 1, 1855. The regiment took part in the seizure of the Malakoff tower on September 8, 1855. The regiment then took part in the Second Italian War of Independence in 1859, as part of the 2nd Infantry Division of the 2nd Army Corps of Patrice de MacMahon, Duke of Magenta. It fought in the Battle of Magenta (French: bataille de Magenta). The regiment entered triumphantly into Milan on June 7, 1859.

Returning to Algeria, the regiment was licensed on December 14, 1861, by Imperial decree. The men were accordingly transferred to the 2nd Foreign Regiment which changed designation on January 1, 1862, to become the Foreign Regiment. During the Mexican expedition from 1861 to 1867, the foreign regiment embarked to Mexico where the latter arrived on March 25, 1863, at Veracruz. The 3rd combat company fought with distinction while sacrificing itself during the Battle of Camarón (French: Bataille de Camerone) on April 30, 1863. The 1st and 2nd battalions participated in the siege of Oaxaca which capitulated in April 1865. The 2nd battalion lost on March 1, 1866, 102 men killed during the combat of Santa Isabel. On December 13 of the same year, the regiment left Mexico. During the Franco-Prussian War (French: Guerre franco-allemande de 1870), the Legion engaged the conflict within delay. It was at the end of September 1870, that the regiment integrated the 15th Crops 1st Brigade, 2nd Division and was found making way towards Orléans (where the regiment refused 3 times consecutively the order to retreat and where foreign Lieutenant Kara, Peter I of Serbia distinguished himself) on October and December 1870 then at Montbéliard in January 1871, where he forced the Germans to leave the city.

=== 1871 to 1914 ===
During the Paris Commune (French: la Commune de Paris) in 1871, the regiment participated with Armée Versaillaise (French: armée versaillaise) to the semaine sanglante ("Bloody Week"). The commander-in-chief of the Armée Versaillaise was Marshal of France Patrice de Mac Mahon. The regiment then returned to Algeria in June 1871 (Mascara near Oran). On January 1, 1885, the "French Foreign Legion", named given to the "Foreign Regiment" on March 13, 1875, doubled in two foreign regiments constituted each of 4 battalions and one depot company. During the Expedition of Madagascar in 1895–1896, the foreign regiment with the 2nd Foreign Regiment, formed a Marching Battalion, which depended on the Algerian Regiment (French: Régiment Algérie), of the Army of Africa (French: l'Armée d'Afrique) under the orders of Colonel Oudri of the 2nd Foreign Regiment.

In 1881, the 1st Foreign Regiment was combat engaged in Morocco (combats of Chellaha of May 19) and South Oran (combat of Chott Tigri on April 26, 1882, where 300 Legionnaires faced 8000 dissidents). The 1st Foreign Regiment combat engaged in 1900 during the Battle of the Oasis, again in South-Oran and the Moroccan confines. On January 27, 1906, the 3rd combat company of the 1st Foreign Regiment crushed the enemy which participated to the combat of El Moungar (where the 22nd company of the 2nd Foreign Regiment had endured heavy losses, and which the battle was surnamed the "Cameron of the Sands").

At the beginning of 1883, the 1st and 2nd battalions of the 1st Foreign Regiment were sent to Tonkin. They apprehended Sontay on December 16, 1883. From January 26 to March 3, 1884, 600 men of Tuyen-Quang out of which 390 Legionnaires repelled 20,000 Chinese regulars.

In 1892, the 1st Foreign Regiment was engaged in Dahomey (Actual Benin) and disembarked at Cotonu on August 22. They combat engaged in September and October. 800 Legionnaires of Colonel Fauraux faced thousands of combatants and re-embarked victorious on November 17.

Between 1892 and 1894, the companies of the 1st Foreign Regiment intervened as well in Sudan. On July 1, 1893, the legionnaires of Lieutenant Betheder and Sergent Minnaêrt fought with ferocity at Bossé. They lost 60 killed and wounded which earned this heroic Sergent (who already distinguished capability at Tonkin) the decoration of the Légion d'honneur for his bravery under fire.

In 1895–1896, the regiment was part of the expedition which went on to the conquest of Madagascar. While combats were effective, climatic conditions were terrible and caused ravages. The losses through diseases were significant (200 dead). The Legionnaires exhausted themselves and gave their full without complaints. It was customary to say that in the Expeditionary Corps: "when a French trooper entered the hospital, it would be for repatriation, a Tirailleur would enter for medical treatment, and a Legionnaire would only enter for dying". The pacification debuted in 1895 and endured till 1905, date of permanent return of units of the 1st Foreign Regiment to Algeria.

The Moroccan époque debuted in 1906. In August 1907, Chef de bataillon (Commandant – Major) Provost was killed at Casablanca while repelling a violent attack. In 1908, the 1st Foreign Regiment 1^{er} RE distinguished capability at Menabah. In 1911, the 22nd combat company of Captain Labordette endured the loss of 29 including their company commander at Alouana.

=== First World War ===
The regiment was not directly combat engaged in World War I. However, the regiment continued to combat administer the institution and supply men for the ensemble of foreign units engaged in the conflict. In 1914, the 1st Foreign Regiment formed the constitution totality or most of the corps of many units.

In Morocco : The 1st Foreign Regiment 1^{er} RE supplied the entire of the 1st Marching Regiment of the 1st Foreign Regiment, 1^{er} RM 1^{er} RE (constituted from the 1st, 2nd and 6th battalions). These units combat engaged for 4 years at the cost of 272 killed at Taza or Sidi-Amar. The 1st Marching Regiment was dissolved on February 15, 1918, and the battalions and mounted companies became autonomous.

In France: The 1st Foreign Regiment formed the corps constitution of the 2nd Marching Regiment, 3rd Marching Regiment and 4th Marching Regiment ("Légion garibaldienne") combat engaged in France, out of which the essential constitution was formed of foreign volunteers for the duration of the war (out of which the prominents featured tour de France champion François Faber, and poets Blaise Cendrars, Camil Campanyà or Alan Seeger). Between March and July 1915, the 3rd and 4th Marching Regiments disappeared after terrible losses. The 2nd Marching Regiment which was cited at 2 occasions was annihilated (1322 killed) with his foreign brother regiment 2nd Marching Regiment of the 2nd Foreign Regiment 2^{e} RM 2^{e} RE in September 1915 during combats of Navarrin. The survivors constituted the renowned Marching Regiment of the Foreign Legion (RMLE) which was entrusted to Colonel Paul-Frédéric Rollet. The RMLE would be the second most decorated unit of the French Army (after the Infantry Colonial Regiment of Morocco, actual RICM).

In the Orient: A provisional regiment was formed of troops of the Army of Africa (France), with the title of 1^{er} Régiment de Marche d'Afrique. The first two battalions were from the Zouaves, and the third battalion was formed of men from the Foreign Legion. This composite infantry battalion would be engaged with other units of the Corps expéditionnaire d'Orient in the Orient (firstly in the Gallipoli campaign in the Dardanelles, and thereafter on the Salonika front). The unit was originally formed of 2 companies of 1st Foreign Infantry Regiment (1^{er} REI) and 2 companies of the 2nd Foreign Infantry Regiment (2^{e} REI). The battalion headquarters company hailed from the 1^{er} REI and the battalion commander (French: chef de bataillon) from the 2^{e} REI. Losing 815 men under fire, the Legion Battalion of 1^{er} RMA was cited 3 consecutive times out of which 2 at the orders of the army before being disbanded on 30 September 1917.

In Tonkin, these attacks were led by Annamese agitators (French: agitateurs annamites) between August 1915 and July 1918. These action would repeat themselves until 1940. The 4th Battalion lost 216 men during this period.

=== Interwar period ===
In 1925, the 1st Foreign Infantry Regiment 1^{er} REI counted 10,000 men repatriated in 9 battalions (8 combat battalions and 1 training battalion, the 5th, 9 specialized companies, and the Communal Depot of Foreign Regiments (DCRE)).

The 4th Battalion forming a corps at Tonkin, rejoined by the 9th created in 1926. The battalion combat engaged Annamese agitators at the cost of more than 200 fatalities.

The 8th battalion and 24th company were in Syria. They combat engaged at Messifré and Soueida on September 12, 1925. The 8th battalion would be cited 2 times at the orders of the army (the first citation was obtained while they belonged to the 4th Foreign Infantry Regiment 4^{e} REI, before becoming the 8th battalion of the 1st Foreign Infantry Regiment 1^{er} REI).

The 1st, 2nd, 3rd, 5th, 6th and 7th as well the specialized units were in Algeria.

Rif War: the conquest of Morocco would require in several times the engagements of units of the 1st Foreign Infantry Regiment 1^{er} REI and especially since 1918.

On August 9, 1918, the 2nd Mounted Company endured terrible combats mounting to 49 fatalities out which 2 out of exhaustion. Their chief, Captain Timm, severely wounded in the leg and in the face, attached himself to a mule to be able to continue his commandment and lead his men. On July 23, 1923, the 6th battalion attacked the Taghzout hill and lost 18 killed and 36 wounded.

The paroxysm of these interventions was reached in 1925-1926 during the Rif War. Four battalions (1st, 2nd, 6th, 7th) and two companies of sapeurs-Pionniers of the 1st Foreign Infantry Regiment 1^{er} REI were engaged (almost 2000 men). At the cost of more than 400 fatalities, the battalions illustrated themselves in furious combats often in close range corps-a-corps combat. On June 10, 1924, the 6th battalion was decimated at the cost of 4 officers killed and 60 fatalities during an operation at night to liberate the post of Mediouna. The 2nd battalion chief, Commandant (Major) Deslandre was killed while leading at the head of his Legionnaires on July 18, 1924, near Tezual.

On May 8, 1926, the general offensive was launched. All the units of the 1st Foreign Regiment were of participation, in particular the 1st, 2nd and 6th battalions. Victory was definite on May 26. Nevertheless, Chef de bataillon (Commandant -Major) Le Roch was killed in violent combats on July 14 while leading the 1st Battalion at the tips of Tizi-N'Ouidel.

The four battalions were cited 5 times (out of which 2 citations for the 6th battalion).

=== Second World War ===
In France: In 1939, the "1st Foreign" directed on France 2500 Cadres and Legionnaires out of the 3000 men, who formed the 11th Foreign Infantry Regiment 11^{e} REI and 12th Foreign Infantry Regiment 12^{e} REI. Three former regimental commanders of the 1^{er} REI would command the 11^{e} REI. These two regiments disappeared during the defeat of 1940 at cost of heavy losses. The 11^{e} REI was cited at the orders of the army, the 12 ^{e} REI at the orders of the division.

In parallel, the 1st battalion of the 1st Foreign Infantry Regiment was transferred to the 13^{e} DBLE which was on its way to Narvik.

In 1941, two battalions of the 1^{er} REI and the company "hors rang" (CHR) constituted the 4th Demi-Brigade of the Foreign Legion (4^{e} DBLE) sent to Senegal. The 1st Foreign Infantry Regiment 1^{er} REI grew back in size by integrating the veterans of the 6th Foreign Infantry Regiment 6^{e} REI whom fought in Syria.

In November 1942, the 1st Battalion of the 1st Foreign Infantry Regiment 1^{er} REI illustrated capability during combats against the Afrika Korps in Tunisia. The 2nd company was annihilated in the Djebel Mansour and was cited at the orders of the army.

With the return of the 4th Demi-Brigade of the Foreign Legion (4^{e} DBLE) to Sidi-Bel-Abbès and the beginning of the campaign of Tunisia in 1943, the 1st Foreign Infantry Regiment 1^{er} REI became the 1st Foreign Marching Infantry Regiment 1^{er} REIM on April 16, 1943. Formed of three battalions, the regiment illustrated combat ability at the cost of 380 fatalities by inflicting heavy losses to the enemy at Pont du Fhas and in the Djebel Zaghouan. For actions incurred, the regiment was cited at the orders of the army, a citation which currently adorns the regimental colors flag of the regiment. The veterans of the 1st Foreign Marching Infantry Regiment 1^{er} REIM and 3rd Foreign Marching Infantry Regiment 3^{e} REIM, would form again the renowned Marching Regiment of the Foreign Legion (RMLE) which participated in full to the total liberation of the national territory.

The 1st Foreign Infantry Regiment 1^{er} REI ceased to exist on June 30, 1943. The respective missions were assured by the DCRE at Bel-Abbès.

=== Indochina War ===
The 1st Foreign Regiment was reborn on May 1, 1946. The regiment participated along the various combat specialized units which would partake operations in which the Legion would lead until 1962 (notably the Mounted Saharan Companies). The regiment accordingly was fully dedicated to the selection, training/instruction of foreign volunteers, institution administration and funneling via the communal depot, general reinforcements for units engaged in Indochina. Accordingly, the regiment did not actually participate directly to the conflict.

On September 1, 1950, the Autonomous Group of the Foreign Legion (GALE) was created, commanded consecutively by Générals Jean Olié and Paul Gardy. This Autonomous Foreign Legion Group was the Commandment ancestor of the actual Legion.

=== Algerian War ===
During the stir-up of "Events in Algeria", the 1st Foreign Regiment 1^{er} RE, like all Legion regiments which lived in Algeria since 1831 would participate to combats which would last until 1962; the regiment endured the loss of 92 Officers, Sous-Officiers (Sergeants to Warrant Officers) and Legionnaires while placing out of combat 1151 rebels and recuperating 529 individual and collective arms.

A couple of dates: November 18, 1954, death of Sous-lieutenant of the 3rd Marching Battalion in Djebel Orbata. On January 7, 1958, the 6th company of Center Instruction No 2 destroyed a band of rebels north-west of Franchetti. On March 5, 1961, the tactical general staff headquarters of the 1st Foreign Regiment 1^{er} RE at the orders of battalion chief (Commandant -Major) Fournier was engaged in the region of Sebdou then Djilali. The section of student candidate sous-officiers of Adjudant Kemenceî responded to the rebels and beat 24, at the cost of 2 fatalities. On August 11, 1961, rebels infiltrated to Sidi-Bel-Abbès. Spotted, they entrenched themselves in a house. The Legionnaires of the 1st Foreign Regiment mounted the assault at the cost of 3 fatalities, out of Legionnaire Zimmerman would be last fatality in Algeria.

Departure: On September 29, 1962, the bodies of général Paul-Frédéric Rollet, Chef de bataillon (Prince) Aage de Danemark, and Legionnaire Zimmermann (representing the ensemble of Legionnaires whom died in Algeria) were transferred to the cemetery at Puyloubier (Bouches du Rhône). October 24, 1962, marked the continental departure ceremony at the Monument aux Morts (which was dismantled and repatriated to Aubagne). The black pavilions brought back from Tuyen-Quang in 1885 by Captain Borelli were burned in application of wishes to have them never leave Sidi-Bel-Abbès. October 26, marked the continental departure.

The 1st Foreign Regiment kept units in the Sahara in accordance with the Evian Accords (defence of the French nuclear test site). The last legionnaires of these Saharan companies would return to Aubagne in 1969 and would notably be garrisoned at Bou-Sfer (with the 2nd Foreign Parachute Regiment 2^{e} REP and 1st Foreign Cavalry Regiment 1^{er} REC leaving in 1967).

=== Since 1962 ===
On July 15, 1962, the precursors arrived at the camp de la Demande at Aubagne, which would become quartier (garrison) Vienot. Colonel Vaillant, regimental commander, disembarked with the regimental colors flag on October 26, 1962.

On April 29, 1963, the first Cameron eve night in metropolis had lieu. On April 30 was the inauguration of the Monument aux Morts repatriated from Algeria and the celebration of the centennial of the battle of Cameron with a military parade.

The Instruction Group of the Foreign Legion (GILE) garrisoned at Corte (Haute-Corse) and Bonifacio (South of Corsica).

In October 1969 : The Motorized Company of the Foreign Legion (CMLE) of the 1st Foreign Regiment was enacted in Corte. The Motorized Company was deployed to Chad at the occasion of Opération Tacaud. The company endured 6 fatalities in combat alongside the 2^{e} REP until disengaging in 1970. The Motorized Company became the 6th company of the Operational Group of the Foreign Legion (GOLE) (created on March 9, 1971).

The 1st Foreign Regiment was split in two giving birth to the 2nd Foreign Infantry Regiment, which took on the former Instruction Group of the Foreign Legion and Operational Group of the Foreign Legion stationed in Corsica.

On July 1, 1981 : creation of the 31st Brigade, which the 1st Foreign Regiment was part of. One unit was deployed to Lebanon within the cadre of the Multinational Force in Lebanon (FMSB) from May to September 1983 (Command element & immediate support, the value size of a company).

September 1990 to April 1991: The 1st Foreign Regiment engaged a Transport Platoon within the cadres of Opération Daguet in the Gulf.

Since 1991, the regiment has regularly supplied and reinforced units of the Legion deployed abroad as well as interior missions (notably Sentinel since 2015).

== Organisation ==
The regiment consists of three companies, as follows:

- Pionniers Sections of Tradition
- Compagnie de Commandement et des Services Régimentaire (CCSR) – Regimental Command and Services Company
- Compagnie des Services de la Légion Étrangère (CSLE) – Foreign Legion Services Company
- Compagnie Administrative du Personnel de la Légion Étrangère (CAPLE) – Foreign Legion Personnel Administration Company

It also runs the following:

- Institution des Invalides de la Légion Étrangère (IILE) à Puyloubier – Foreign Legion Invalid Institution, at Puyloubier
- Centre d’Hébergement et d’Accueil de la Légion Étrangère (CHALE) à la Ciotat – Foreign Legion Accommodation & Welcome Center, at Ciotat
- Centre des Permissionnaires de la Légion Étrangère de la Malmousque (CPLEM) à Marseille – Foreign Legion Leave Center, at Malmousque

Also reported within the regiment is the Foreign Legion Emergency Staff and Statistics Division, a Legion intelligence section.

== Tradition ==
=== Insignia ===
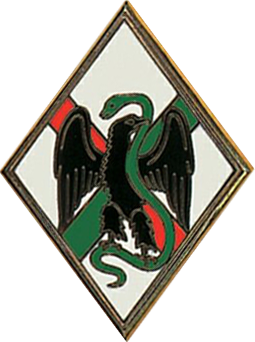
Regimental Insignia of the 1st Foreign Regiment, 1^{er} R.E.

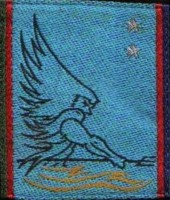
The Foreign Legion Groupment, G.L.E in the 31st Brigade featuring Poseidon

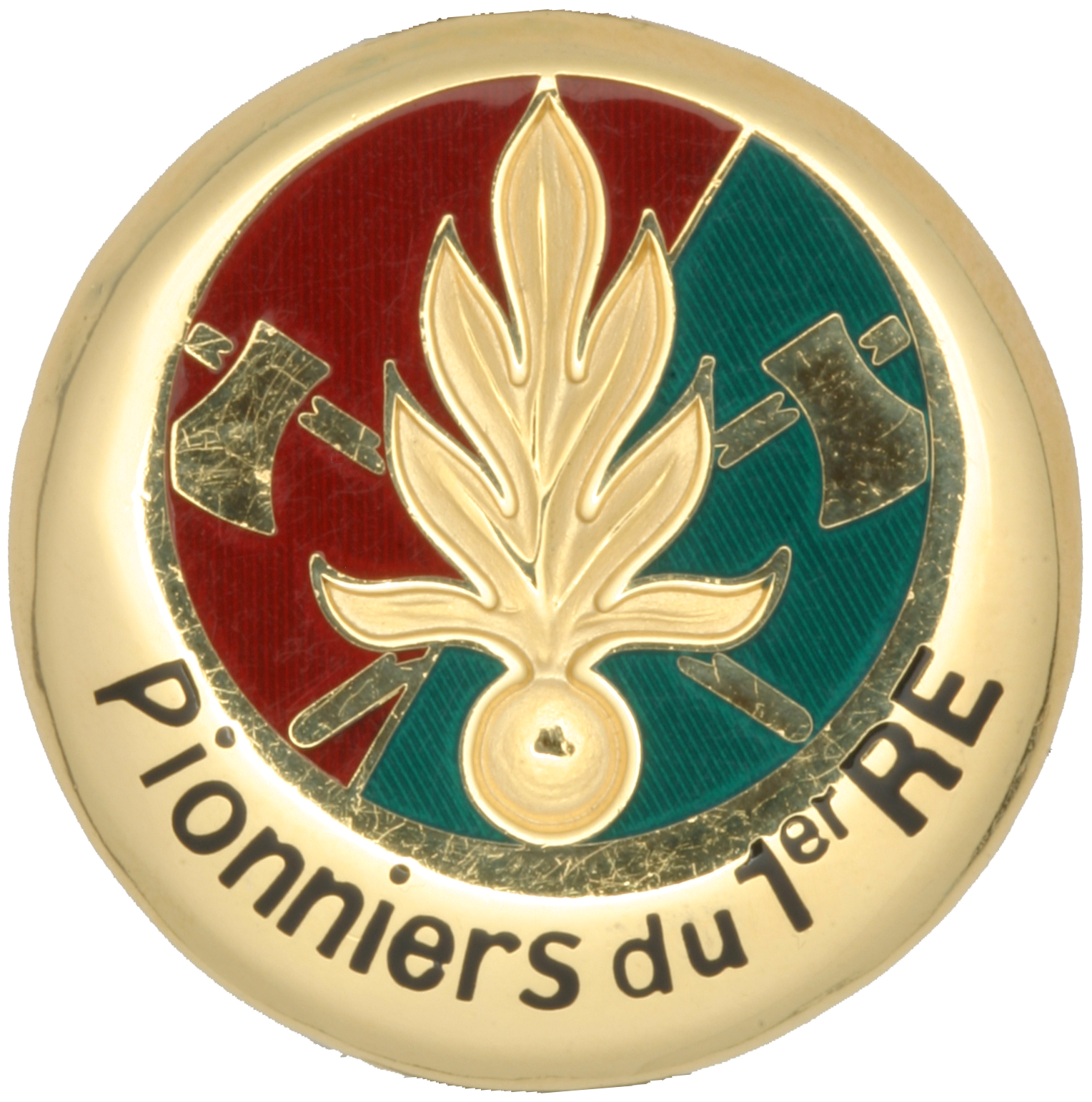
Pionniers of the 1st Foreign Regiment

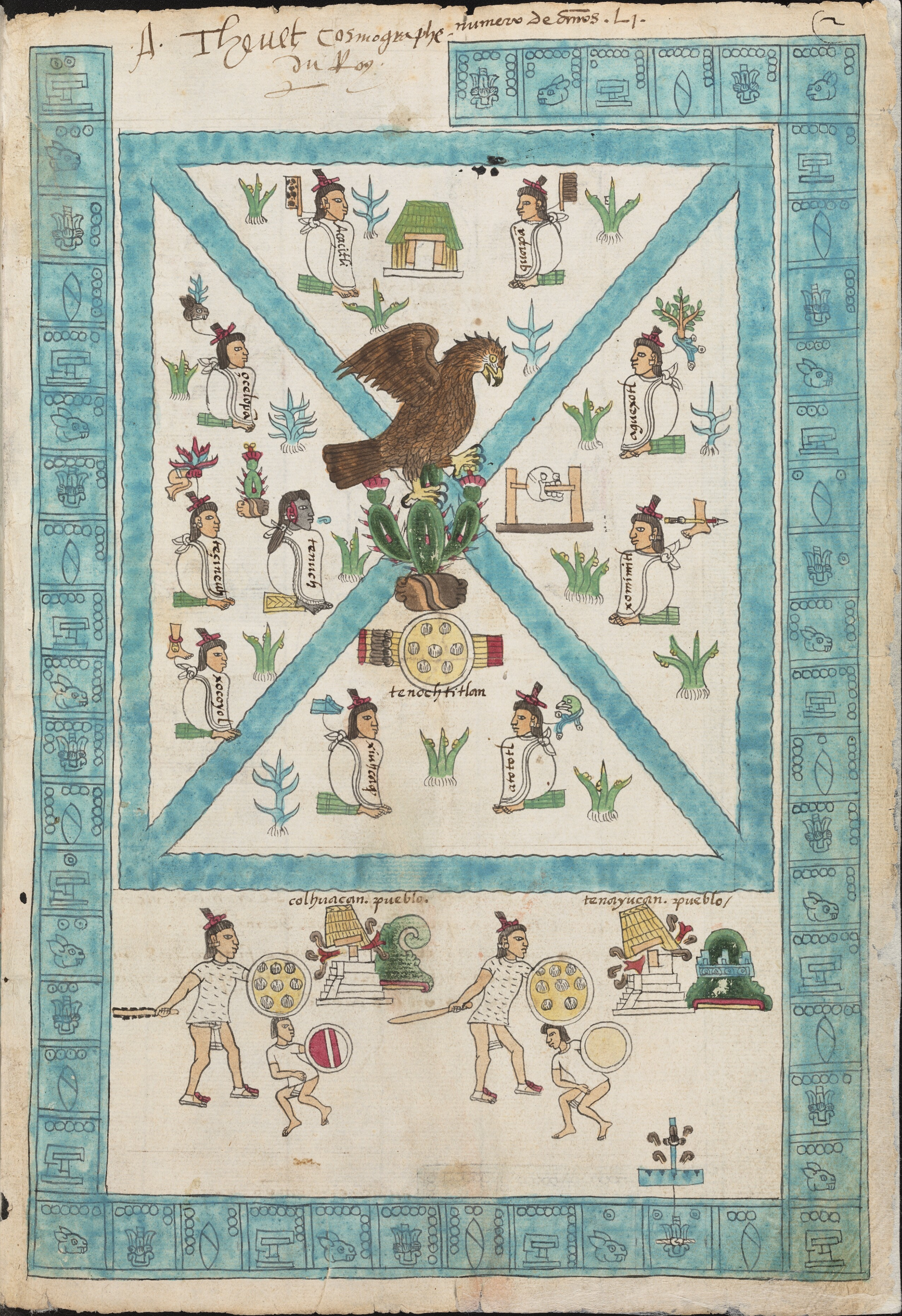
Codex Mendoza

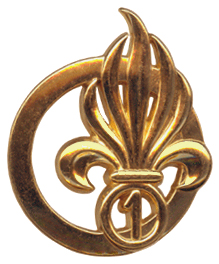
Beret insignia of the 1st Foreign Regiment

The insignia of the 1st Foreign Infantry Regiment, (1^{er} R.E.I), (1950-1955) retook the symbolics of the Foreign Legion with the grenade of 7 flames and the green, red colors of the legion. The regiment is represented inside the grenade while the globe commemorates the relic of the Foreign Legion in Sidi Bel Abbès.

The current insignia of the 1st Foreign Regiment, (1^{er} R.E), retook the symbolic ruban of the Commemorative medal of the Mexico Expedition created in 1863. This insignia was initially destined for the 3rd company of the 4th Foreign Regiment 4^{e} RE in 1936. The insignia became that of the Autonomous Group of the Foreign Legion, (G.A.L.E) and was then adopted by the 1st Foreign Regiment, (1^{er} R.E.) in 1955.

The insignia makes reference to a white diamond shape on which figures the arms of Mexico (a black coloured Mexican golden eagle (Aquila chrysaetos), locking on a serpent, as depicted on the flag of Mexico) and a saltire with Foreign Legion and Mexican colors.

=== Regimental colors ===
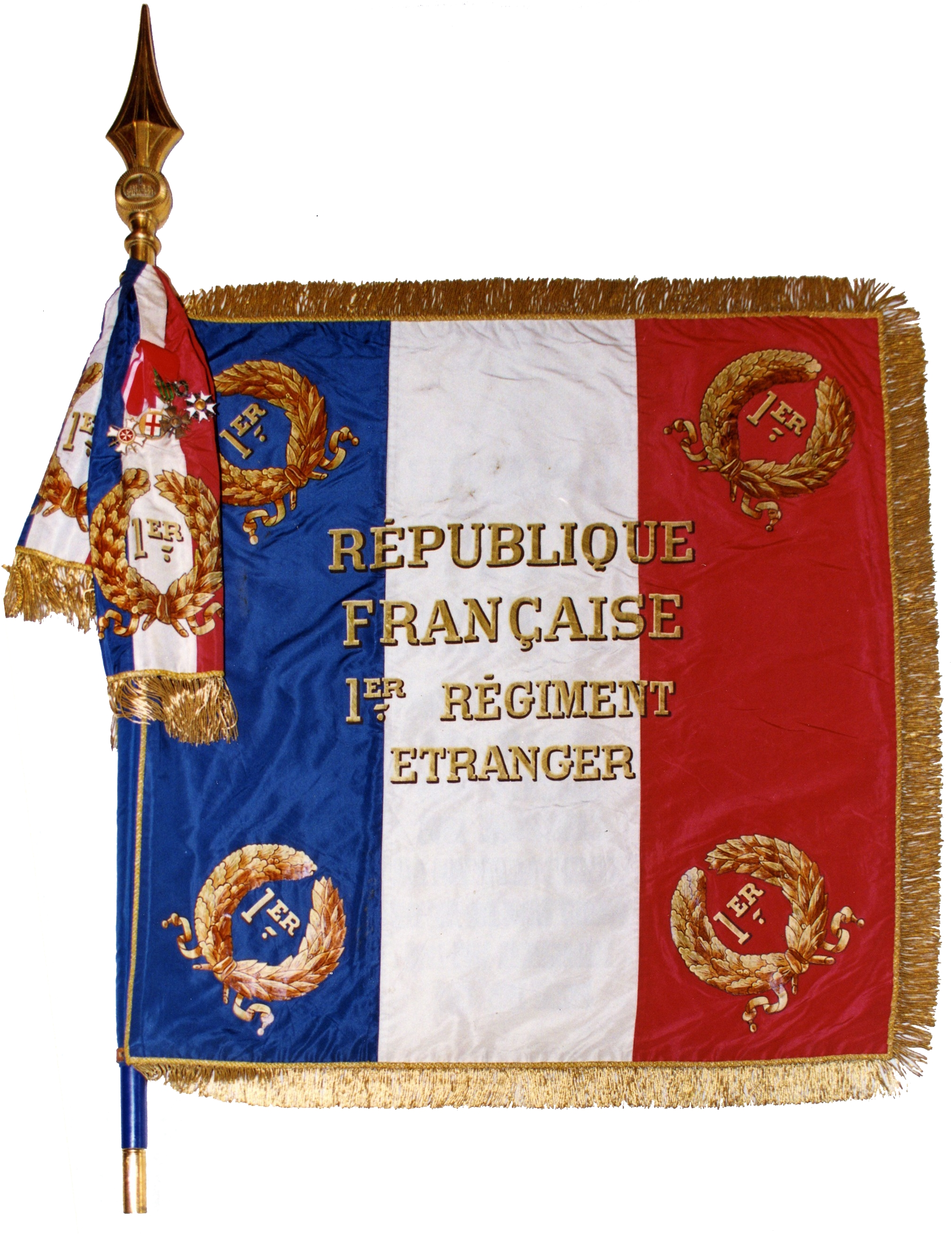
Regimental Colors of the 1st Foreign Regiment, 1^{er} R.E

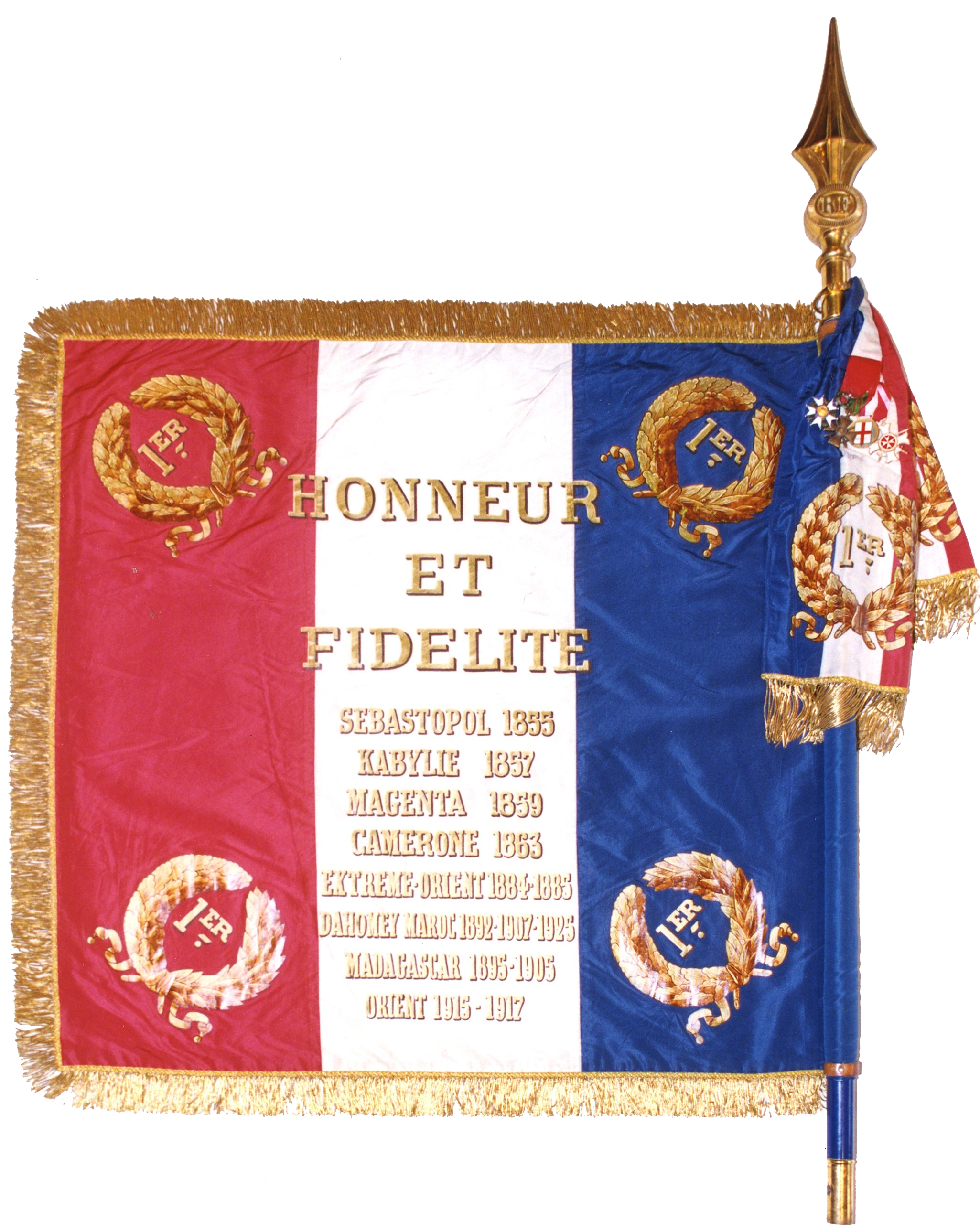
Verso Colors of the 1st Foreign Regiment, 1^{er} R.E with Honneur et Fidélité.

=== Regimental Song ===
Chant de Marche : Nous sommes tous des volontaires featuring:

Nous sommes tous des volontaires,
Les gars du 1^{er} étranger,
Notre devise est légendaire,
Honneur Fidélité – Fidélité,
Marchons légionnaires,
Dans la boue, dans le sable brûlant, (bis)
Marchons l'âme légère, (bis)
Et le cœur vaillant, (bis)
Marchons légionnaires. (bis)

Nous marchons gaiement en cadence,
Malgré le vent malgré la pluie,
Les meilleurs soldats de la France,
Sont là devant vous, les voici.

Partout où le combat fait rage,
L'on voit le 1er étranger,
Exemple d'héroïsme, de courage,
Se couvrir de glorieux lauriers.

Gardons dans le fond de nos âmes,
Le souvenir de nos aînés,
Et pour la grenade à sept flammes,
Loyal prêt à tout sacrifier.

=== Decorations ===
- Legion of Honour on April 28, 1906
- Croix de guerre 1939–1945 (France) with 1 palm
- Gold Medal of the City of Milan since March 9, 1909
- Cross with swords of the Sovereign Military Order of Malta
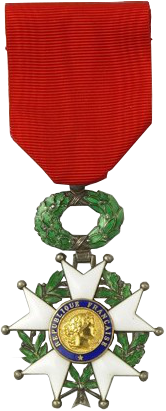
Legion of Honour

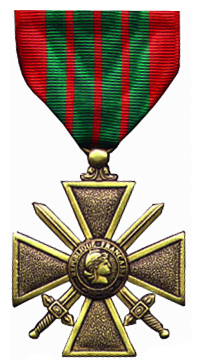
Croix de guerre 1939–1945 with 1 palm

Gold Medal of the City of Milan

=== Honors ===
==== Battle honours ====
- Sevastopol 1855
- Kabilie 1857
- Magenta 1859
- Camerone 1863
- Extrême-Orient 1884–1885
- Dahomy-Maroc 1892–1907, 1925
- Madagascar 1895–1905
- Orient 1915–17
- AFN 1952–1962

== Foreign Legion and Regimental Commanders ==
=== Tenure (1841–1955) ===
1st Regiment of the 1st Foreign Legion Tenure (1841 -1856)
1^{er} Régiment étranger de la Légion étrangère, (1^{er} R.E.L.E)

- 1841 : colonel de Mollenbeck
- 1842 : colonel Despinoy
- 1843 : colonel Mouret
- 1846 : colonel Mellinet
- 1850 : colonel de Givry
- 1851 : colonel Bazaine
- 1854 : colonel Vienot killed heading the regiment
- 1855 : colonel Levy
- 1855 : colonel de Cordoue

1st Foreign Regiment Tenure (1856–1862)
1^{er} Régiment étranger, (1^{er} R.E)

- 1856 : colonel Meyer
- 1858 : colonel de Saint-André
- 1858 : colonel Granchette
- 1858 : colonel Brayer
- 1859 : colonel Martinez

Foreign Regiment Tenure (1862–1875)
Régiment étranger, (R.E.)

- 1862 : colonel Butet
- 1862 : colonel Jeanningros
- 1865 : colonel Lavoignet
- 1865 : colonel d'Ornano
- 1866 : general Jeanningros
- 1866 : colonel de Courcy
- 1866 : colonel Guilhem
- 1867 : colonel Deplanque
- 1870 : colonel de Curten
- 1870 : colonel Thierry
- 1871 : colonel Chaulan
- 1871 : colonel de Mallaret

Foreign Legion Tenure (1875–1884)
Légion étrangère, (L.E)

- 1875 : colonel de Mallaret
- 1881 : colonel de Négrier
- 1883 : colonel Grisot

1st Foreign Regiment Tenure (1885-1942)
1^{er} Régiment Etranger, (1^{er} R.E)

- 1885 : colonel Grisot
- 1886 : colonel Wattringue
- 1890 : colonel Barberet
- 1891 : colonel Zeni
- 1895 : colonel de Villebois-Mareuil
- 1896 : colonel Bertrand
- 1900 : colonel Dautelle
- 1904 : colonel René Boutegourd
- 1907 : colonel Girardot
- 1910 : colonel Bavouzet
- 1913 : colonel Boyer
- 1914 : Lt.colonel Cosman
- 1914 : colonel Tahon
- 1915 : Lt.colonel Met
- 1916 : Lt.colonel Heliot
- 1918 : Lt.colonel Forey
- 1920 : colonel Boulet-Desbarreau
- 1925 : colonel Rollet
- 1931 : colonel Nicolas
- 1934 : colonel Maire
- 1934 : colonel Debas
- 1935 : colonel Azas
- 1939 : colonel Robert
- 1940 : colonel Flan
- 1940 : colonel Girard
- 1940 : colonel Bouty
- 1941 : colonel Lambert
- 1941 : colonel Barre
- 1942 : colonel Vias

1st Foreign Marching Infantry Regiment Tenure (1943)
1^{er} Régiment étranger d'infanterie de marche, (1^{er} R.E.I.M)

- 1943 : Lt.colonel Gentis

1st Foreign Infantry Regiment Tenure (recreated 1949-1955)
1^{er} régiment étranger d'infanterie, (1^{er} R.E.I)

- 1949 : colonel Babonneau
- 1949 : colonel Gaultier
- 1950 : colonel Pénicaut
- 1953 : colonel Thomas
- 1955 : colonel Raberin

=== Tenure (1955-present) ===
- 1956 : colonel Thomas
- 1959 : colonel Brothier
- 1961 : colonel Vaillant
- 1963 : colonel Vadot
- 1966 : colonel Chenel
- 1968 : colonel Fuhr
- 1970 : colonel Letestu
- 1972 : Lt.colonel Plantevin
- 1974 : colonel Riou
- 1976 : colonel Delsuc
- 1976 : colonel Thibout
- 1978 : colonel Ameline
- 1980 : colonel Talbourdet
- 1982 : Lt.colonel Bénézit
- 1984 : colonel Cler
- 1986 : colonel Carles
- 1989 : colonel Bernier
- 1992 : colonel Cayrou
- 1994 : colonel Raymond
- 1996 : colonel Blevin
- 1998 : colonel Pierson
- 2000 : colonel Relave
- 2002 : colonel Guenin
- 2004 : Lt.colonel Lantaires
- 2006 : colonel Hackenbruch
- 2008 : colonel Labat
- 2010 : colonel des Courtils
- 2012 : Lt.colonel de Besombes
- 2014 : colonel Rousseau
- 2016 : Lt.colonel Dujon

== Notable members ==
- Captain Jean Danjou
- Peter I of Serbia
- Captain Joseph Arthur Dufaure du Bessol
- Siegfried Freytag, German Aviation Ace
- Brigadier General Giuseppe Garibaldi II with his 5 brothers, 2 of whom were killed in combats at Argonne in 1915.
- Hermann Eckstein (1903-1976)
- Eugene Jaques Bullard
- Pierre Segretain
- Pierre Jeanpierre
- Peter J. Ortiz
- Serge Andolenko
- Louis-Antoine Gaultier
- Gabriel Bablon

== Gallery ==
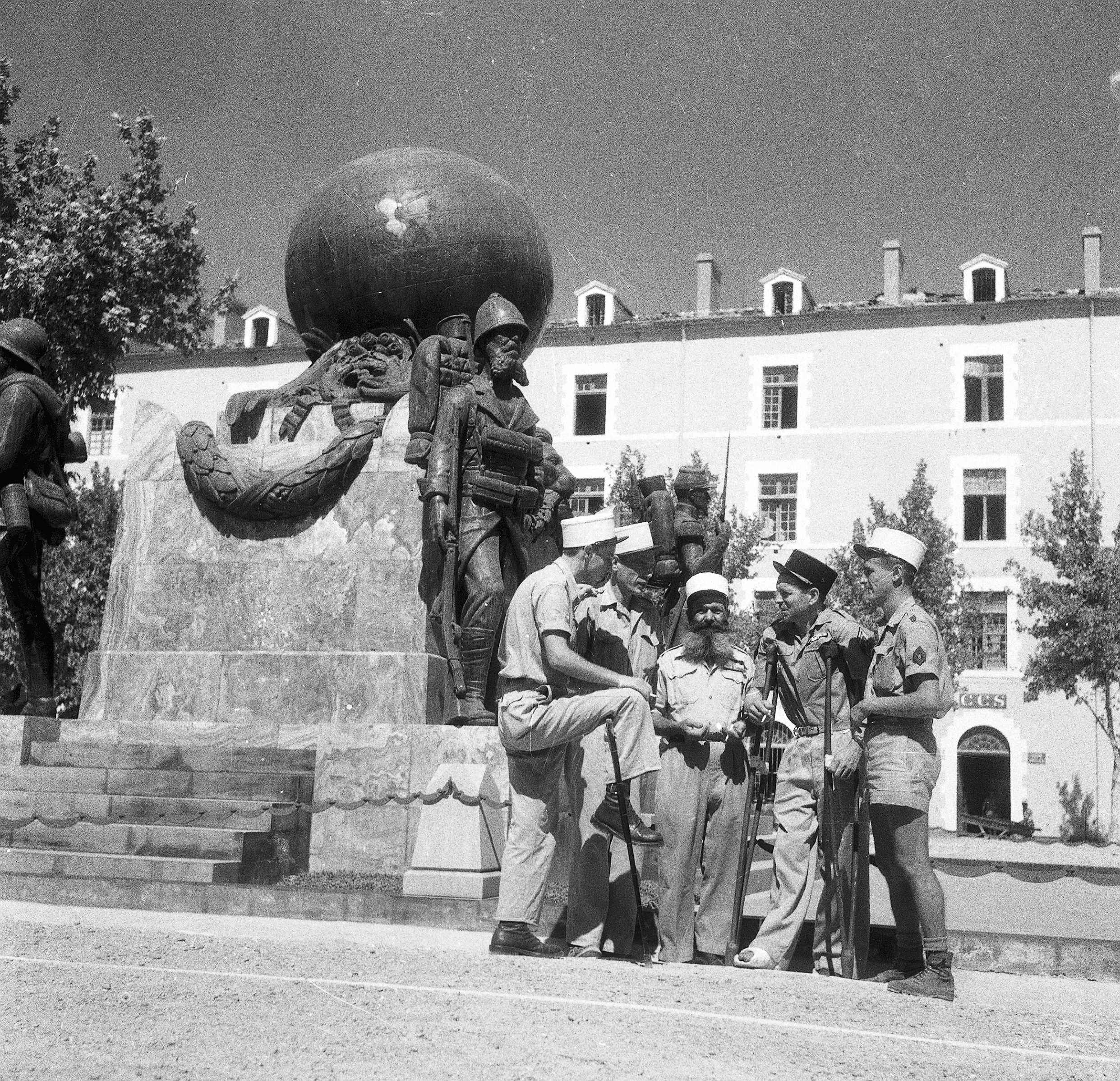
Relic of the Foreign Legion at Sidi bel-Abbès

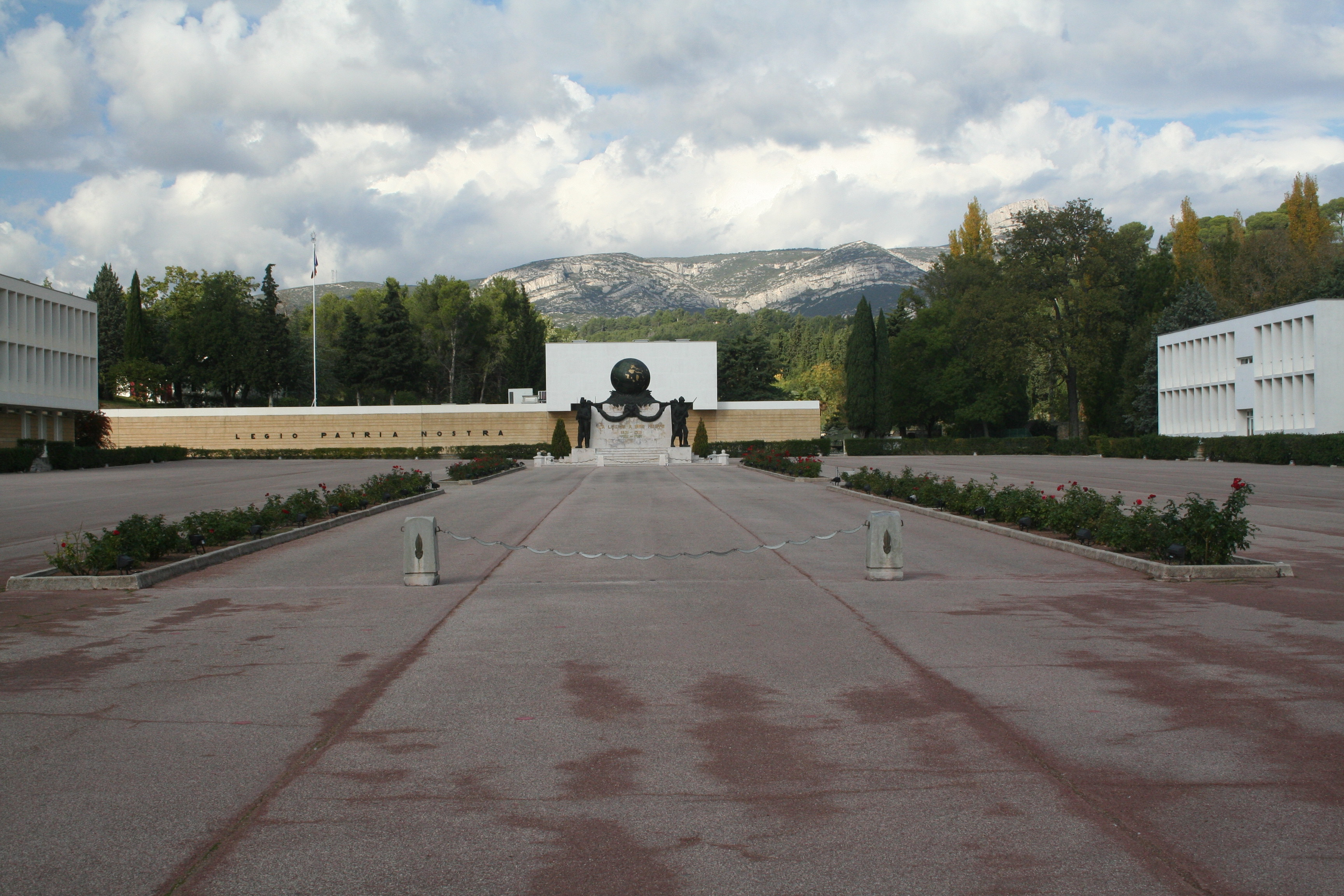
Place d'armes of garrison (quartier) Vienot at Aubagne

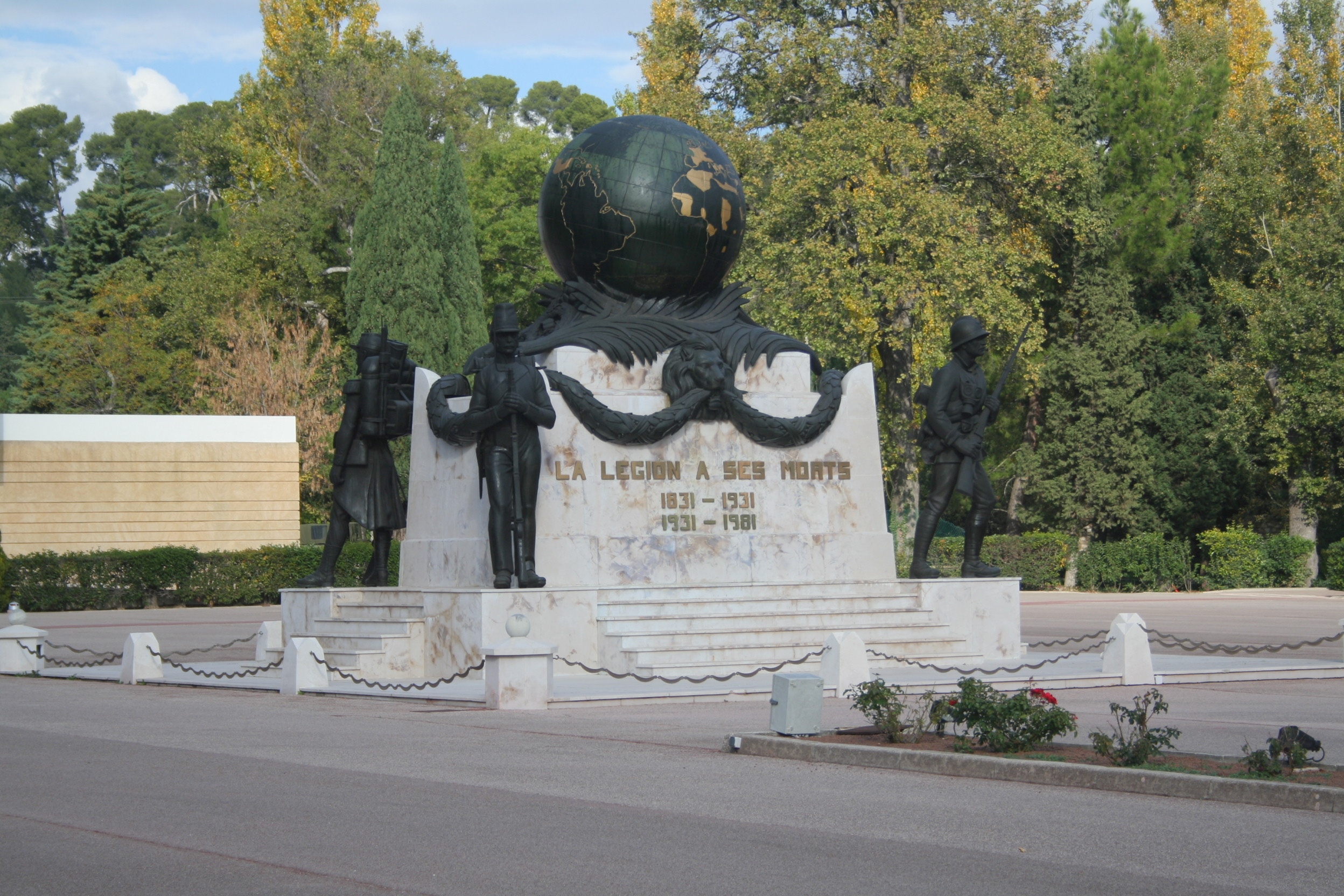
Monument Morts Legion

== See also ==
- Major (France)
- Swiss Guard
- Moroccan Division
- Marching Regiment of the Foreign Legion
- List of French Foreign Legion units

=== Bibliography ===
- Mongin, Jean Marie (2019). La Légion Étrangère: 1831-1962, une histoire par l'uniforme de la légion étrangère (in French). Illustrated by André Jouineau. Bayeux: Heimdal. ISBN 978-2840485360.
- Windrow, Martin (1971). French Foreign Legion. Men-at-Arms. London: Osprey. ISBN 978-0-85-045051-4.
- Windrow, Martin (2011). French Foreign Legionnaire 1890 - 1914. Warrior. London: Osprey. ISBN 978-1-84-908422-2.
- Windrow, Martin (2010). French Foreign Legion 1872–1914. Men-at-Arms. London: Osprey. ISBN 978-1-84-908326-3.
- Windrow, Martin (1999). French Foreign Legion 1914–45. Men-at-Arms. London: Osprey. ISBN 978-1-85-532761-0.
- Windrow, Martin (1996). French Foreign Legion - Infantry and Cavalry since 1945. Men-at-Arms. London: Osprey. ISBN 978-1-85-532621-7.

=== Websites ===
- www.legion-etrangere.com
