= Marie Louis Henry de Granet-Lacroix de Chabrières =

- Born: March 1, 1807; Bollène, France
- Died: June 4, 1859 (age 52); Magenta, Italy; Mort pour la France
- Military career
- Allegiance: France
- Branch: French Army; French Foreign Legion
- Rank: Colonel
- Commands: 2nd Foreign Legion Regiment; 2^{ème} R.E.L.E (1855); 2nd Foreign Regiment; 2^{ème} R.E. (1856–1859)

Marie Louis Henry de Granet-Lacroix de Chabrières (1807–1859), French officer Mort pour la France, son of Baron Pierre Henry Joseph and Claudine Olympe of Lancelin de Larolière, was born on March 1, 1807, at Bollène (Vancluse) and died on June 4, 1859, at the Battle of Magenta (French: Bataille de Magenta).

== Military career ==
He entered into Saint-Cyr in 1825, and served in the 19th Light Infantry Regiment (French: 19^{e} Régiment d’Infanterie Légère), with whom he participated to the siege of Antwerp (French: Anvers) in 1832. He was made a Knight of the Order of the Legion d'honneur on January 9, 1833, and was promoted to captain on April 26, 1837.

With 19th Light, he disembarked in Africa in 1841. On October 16, 1842, he was designated as Chef de bataillon at the 13th Light Infantry Regiment in Algeria where he was wounded, on May 3, by fires during the combat of djebel Boukoulouf.

He joined the French Foreign Legion in 1843; he commanded the 2nd battalion, then stationed at Bône. Under the orders of the Duke d'Aumale, he took part to the columns in the Aurès, Sétif, Némentcha, sector de Collo, Bougie, Guelma, at the head of the 1st battalion against the Ziban and removed along with his battalion, the ksar de M’Chounech in March 1844. He was made Officer of the Order of the Legion d'honneur on August 20, 1845. He distinguished himself in various affairs and notably at the corps column of général Randon in the region of de Tébessa in 1846, where the general cited him for the affairs that took place between June 2 and June 5.

H resigned from the army in January 1848. Seven years later, colonel at Foreign Title, he reassumed service at the head of the 2nd Regiment of the 2nd Foreign Legion formed in Besancon in February 1855. However, the organization of this second Legion proved some difficulties.

On May 29 of the same year, he obtained to switch with Colonel de Caprez, commandant of the 2nd Foreign Regiment of the 1st French Foreign Legion, he accordingly joined his new corps under the walls of Sevastopol a couple weeks prior the assault which put end to the siege of Sevastopol on September 8. However, the 2nd Regiment was not engaged. Heading his regiment, he entered into the conquered city, then took part to the last operations in the Orient War.

On April 16, 1856, he was admitted in the French cadre with his rank and conserved the commandment of the « new 2nd Foreign » (French: « nouveau 2^{e} Etranger »). In June 1856, Legion returned to Algeria. The Legion disembarked at Mers el-Kébir, on July 6, then won by Sidi-Bel-Abbès, where his two regiments were founded on August 9, to constitute the 2nd Foreign Regiment.

Following the campaign in Crimea, he joined Algeria and took part, from May to July 1857, in the expedition of Marshal of the Empire Randon who would reduce Kabylie. His action at the head of the 2nd Foreign Regiment was decisive in the battle of Icheriden (French: bataille d'Icheriden) which, on June 24, led to the success of the operation. On August 17, he assumed commandment of the subdivision of Sidi-Bel-Abbès and exercised accordingly important administrative and political functions, while conjointly assuming the role of regimental commander.

In March 1859, the 2nd Foreign was destined for the expedition in Italy. He embarked on April 19 and following a layover at Marseille, he disembarked at Gênes, on April 26. On June 4, 1859, during the Battle of Magenta (French: Bataille de Magenta), Colonel de Chabrières was at the gates of the city. On Horse at the head of his Legionnaires who charged the Austrians, he found death at Magenta, hit by a bullet in the middle of his chest while ordering the charge of his regiment.

The garrison of the 2nd Foreign Infantry Regiment 2^{e} REI, at Nîmes, bears his name.

Like many noble figures of the Legion, this man was buried in a small cemetery (under the Ruins of a Château House). Resting in that cemetery also, are only numerous house members of his family. The Legion would take charge of maintaining this small cemetery. The inscriptions on the tomb are still visible in 2008.

== Decorations ==
- Knight Order of the Légion d’honneur L.H on January 9, 1833,
- Officer Order of the L.H on August 20, 1845,
- Commander Order of the L.H on August 13, 1857
- Crimean Medal
- Military Merit of Sardinia
- Medal of Italy
- 1st Class Spanish Cross of San Ferdinand
- 3rd Class Medal of the Ottoman Order of Medjidie

== See also ==
- Origins of the French Foreign Legion
- History of the 2nd Foreign Regiment
- Raphaël Vienot
- François Certain Canrobert
- Patrice de MacMahon, Duke of Magenta
