= Sainte-Barbe, Moselle =

Sainte-Barbe
- Commune
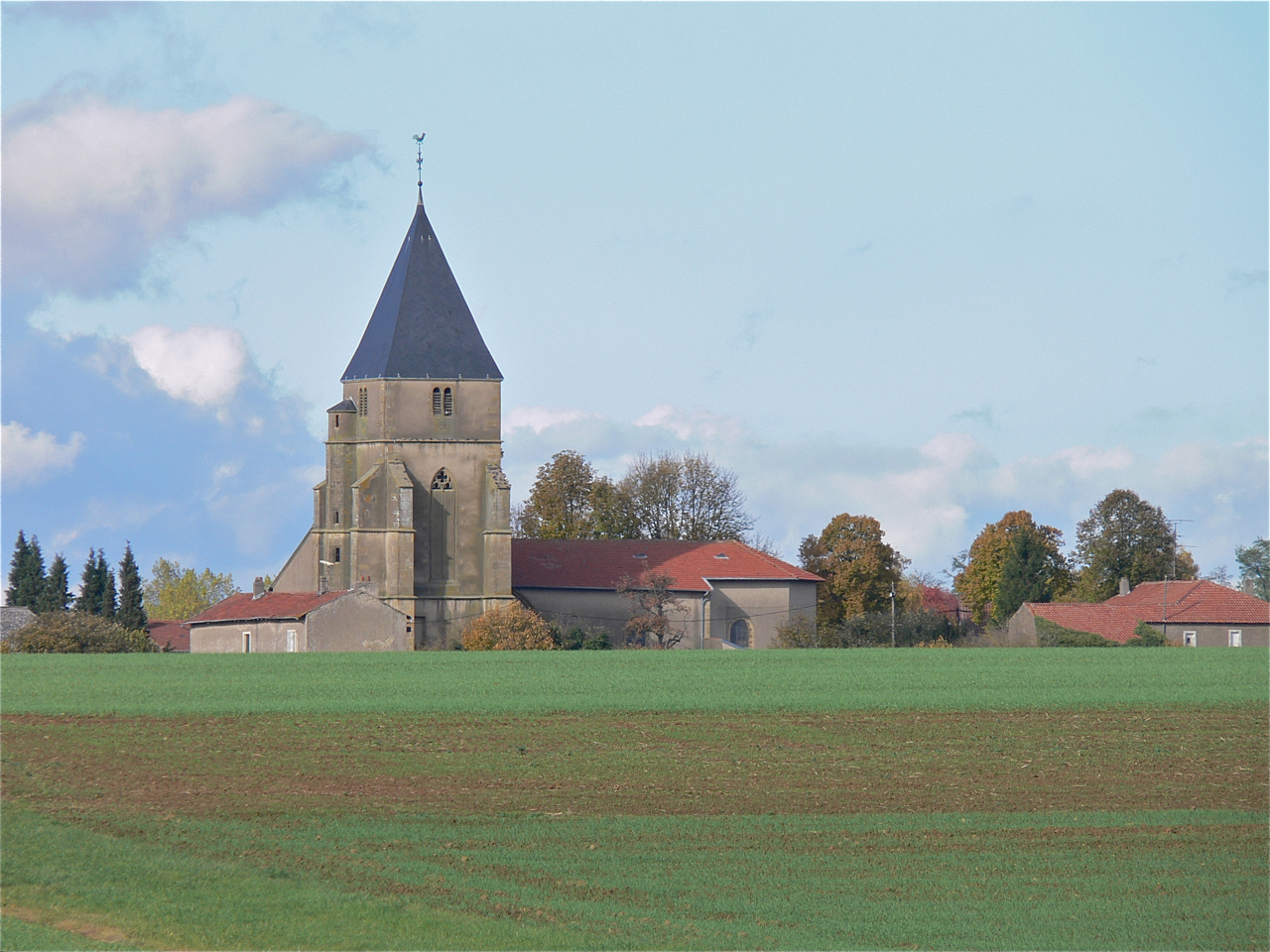
- The old abbey in Sainte-Barbe

- Coat of arms
- Location of Sainte-Barbe
- Location within France Location within Grand Est
- Coordinates: 49°09′34″N 6°18′09″E
- Country: France
- Region: Grand Est
- Department: Moselle
- Arrondissement: Metz
- Canton: Le Pays Messin

Government
  - Mayor (2020–2026): Christian Perrin
- Area^{1}: 13.84 km^{2} (5.34 sq mi)
- Elevation: 329 m (1,079 ft)
- Highest elevation: 318 m (1,043 ft)
- Lowest elevation: 225 m (738 ft)
- Population (2023): 786
  - Density: 56.8/km^{2} (147/sq mi)
- Time zone: UTC+01:00 (CET)
  - Summer (DST): UTC+02:00 (CEST)
- INSEE/Postal code: 57607 /57640
- ^{1} French Land Register data, which excludes lakes, ponds, glaciers > 1 km^{2} (0.386 sq mi or 247 acres) and river estuaries.

Sainte-Barbe (French pronunciation: [sɛ̃t baʁb]; German: Sankt Barbara) is a commune in the Moselle department in Grand Est in north-eastern France.

== See also ==
- Communes of the Moselle department
