= 2nd Foreign Legion (France) =

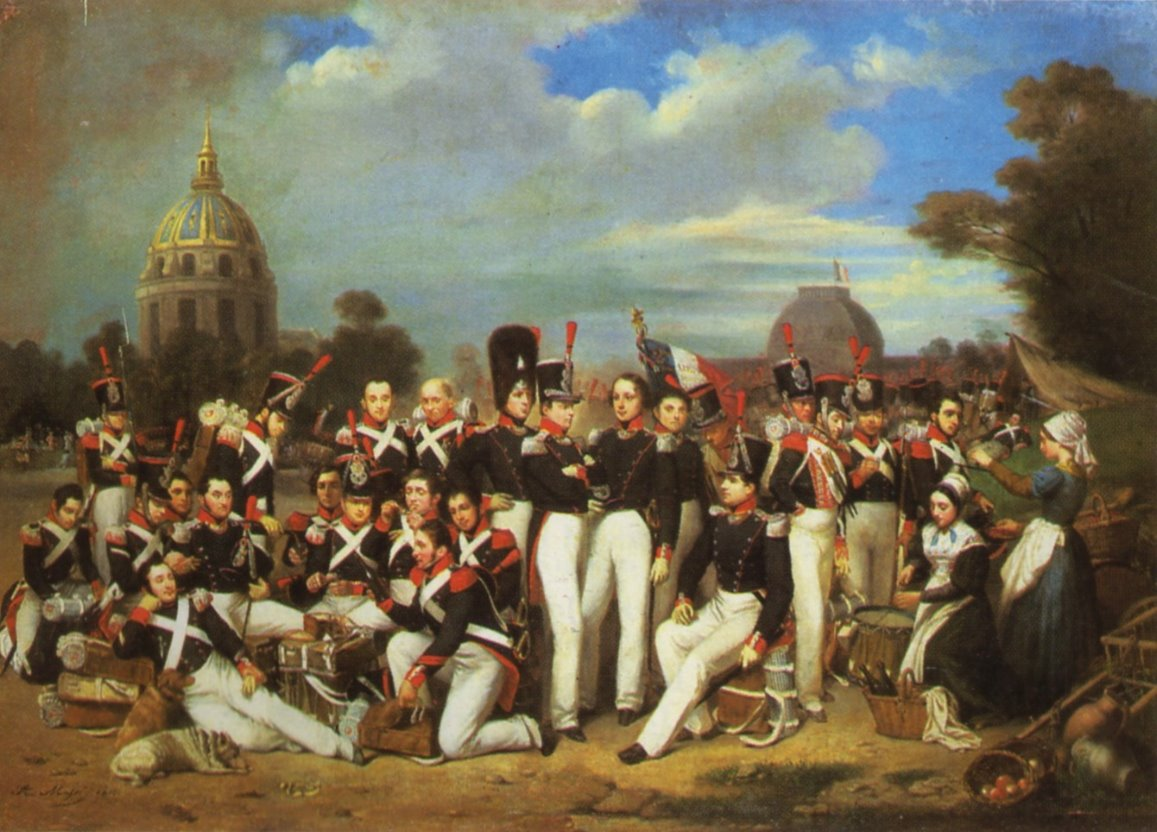
A company of the 2nd Legion on the Champ de Mars in Paris (1836).

The 2nd Foreign Legion (French: Deuxième legion) was created by the King. On 29 June 1835 Louis Philippe I, the King of France ceded the Foreign Legion to Queen Isabella II of Spain.

Subsequently, 4100 men which included foreigners in service of France and French officers passed accordingly into the ranks of the Spanish Army, which was in confrontation with the Carlists.

Nevertheless, the campaign of Algeria required numerous troops; accordingly on 16 December 1835, the King signed a Royal Ordinance which created a New Legion.

== Creation of the Second Legion ==
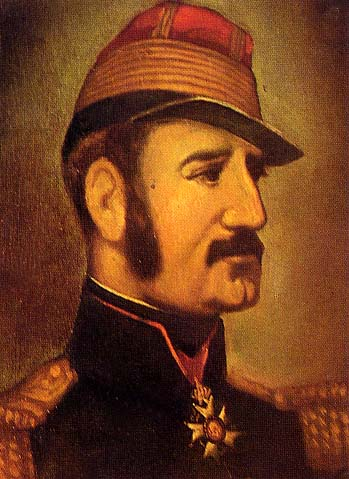
Portrait of Marie Alphonse Bedeau.

The format was first limited to one battalion. The others were later successively constituted, and only if they were required. All the dispositions of the Royal Ordinance of 10 March 1831 (date of creation of the 1831 Legion) were placed rigorously in application.

The first battalion was immediately formed in Pau. On 3 February 1836 chef de bataillon (Commandant - Major) Marie Alphonse Bedeau was entrusted with command. One month later, the general staff headquarters of the battalion and the first two companies were formed. Six other companies where formed later in June 1836.

== New dissolution ==
However, in the following month of August, the battalion was licensed and the government proposed to the Officers, Sous-Officiers, and Legionnaires which formed the battalion to serve Spain in the ranks of the French Auxiliary Division, called ex-Legion, which was fighting there for almost a year already. Those who refused were sent back to their foyers. Those which volunteered for service in Spain formed a new battalion which was directed on Pamplona under the orders of lieutenant-colonel Conrad.

== Recreation and departure to Algeria ==
Despite the dismissal of the Foreign Legion, foreigners were still vibrant in their volunteerism at the corps of the French Army. Accordingly, new depot companies were created and in October 1836, a total of six companies were formed, rapidly followed by the formation of two more in November.

This new battalion was placed under the commandment of chef de bataillon Marie-Alphonse Bedeau. On 5 December 1836 the battalion left Pau to embark on the Suffren, at Toulon, making its way by sea to Algeria.

The battalion accordingly joined the 2nd Brigade of the Army of Africa, commanded by général Négrier.

The second battalion was formed in July 1837. The creation of three others were echeloned until 1840. Following the seizure of Constantine, in October 1837, during which the Legion battalion fought well, chef de battalion Bedeau was promoted to lieutenant-colonel and the formation of elite companies was authorized. To award these arms accomplishments, the Legion received on 7 June 1840 the flag, which was given in 1832 to the first Legion.

== Notes ==
- some material sourced from Képi Blanc (publication)
- some material sourced from Division histoire et patrimoine de la Légion étrangère
