= Origins of the French Foreign Legion =

The Foreign Legion was established in 1831 by King Louis Philippe I to consolidate all foreign corps fighting under French colors, which included, among others, the Swiss Guards, the Swiss regiments of the Royal Guard, and the Hohenlohe Regiment. After its creation, the Legion participated in the further recruitment of foreign nationals into French military service.

Initially, the Legion was heavily involved in the French conquest of Algeria (1830–1849) and the First Carlist War (1833–1840). After the Legion was essentially abandoned by the French government during the First Carlist War, a second Legion was formed in 1836. This Legion would become the modern Foreign Legion and would participate in the expansion and maintenance of the French colonial empire during the 19th and 20th centuries.

== Foreign nationals in the service of France ==
=== Middle Ages and Ancien Régime ===
There is evidence of the French monarchy hiring foreign soldiers since before the Bourbon Restoration.

In 1346, Philip VI of France deployed 15,000 Genovese soldiers at the Battle of Crécy. The 13th century and the 14th century also saw large free companies of Scottish, Castilian, Savoyard, Swiss, and Dutch soldiers serving under various chiefs and princes.

During the reign of Louis XI, 20–30% of the French army consisted of non-French soldiers. Additionally, Louis XI employed a Garde Écossaise (Scottish Guard) and up to 6000 Swiss guards in 1480.

Francis I created the Foreign Regiments of the Ancien Régime., formed mostly from foreign infantry corps.

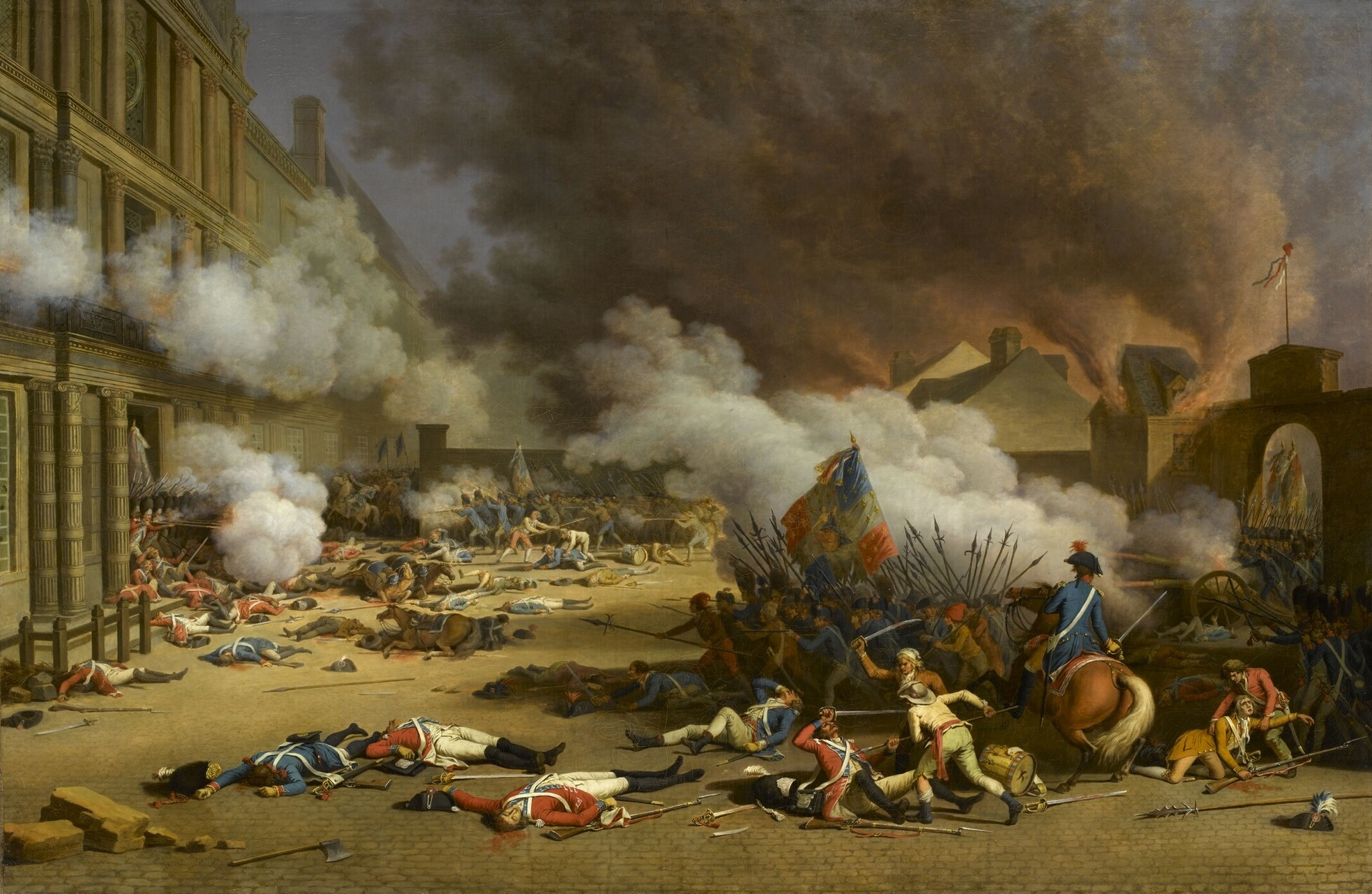
Day of August 10, 1792 La Prise des Tuileries (The taking of the Tuileries). The red uniforms of the Swiss are distinct from the other combatants.

During the Seven Years' War, France mustered 32 foreign regiments: twelve German units, ten Swiss, seven Irish, two Italian and one Scottish.

During the French Revolution, the National Legislative Assembly allowed the use of foreign soldiers and created foreign volunteer units, such as the Foreign Volunteer Units in Service of France. In its July 26, 1792 decree, the Assembly stated that "if the enemies' kingdoms would deploy numerous armies against the free people, it is important for these free people to admit into their ranks all the men whose sublime impulse calls to fight for the sacred cause of Liberty." Accordingly, the Légion Franche Etrangère (Free Foreign Legion), a precursor to the modern-day Foreign Legion, was created on August 1, 1792. Germanic, Italian, Batavian, and Polish Legions were also formed. During this period, 42,000 out of a total of 146,000 soldiers in the French army were non-French nationals.

=== First French Empire ===
The conquests of the First French Empire created a large demand for foreign troops, and the proportion of non-French soldiers reached record levels; up to one-sixth of total soldiers actively engaged in combat were foreign troops. After his rise to power, Napoleon Bonaparte initially recruited 4,000 Swiss troops. That number swelled to 90,000 by the end of his reign, many of whom were incorporated in the Valaison Battalion.

In 1805, the Regiment of Tour d'Auvergne and the Regiment of Isembourg were formed from Russian and Austrian prisoners. These two regiments were later renamed the 1st Foreign Regiment and 2nd Foreign Regiment, respectively, and were dissolved in 1814. The Piedmontese Legion (Légion du Midi), created in 1803, was composed of former French soldiers and recruits from the French departments of Italy. Napoleon's forces would also include the Spanish Pioneers, the Catalonian Regiment, the Hanoverian Legion, the Egyptian Mamluks, and the Portuguese Legion. Between 1806 and 1814, there were 60 foreign units commanded by 136 generals. Many of these were European volunteers; conscripts came only from regions annexed by the Empire. It is estimated that out of the 400,000 soldiers who initially participated in the French Invasion of Russia in 1812, only 120,000 were French nationals. During his return to France in the Hundred Days, Napoleon was at the head of eight foreign regiments.

=== Bourbon Restoration ===
In 1815, under Louis XVIII, the Royal Foreign Legion consisted of six regiments of 14,000 Swiss soldiers and four regiments of Portuguese and Spanish soldiers.

== Creation of the Foreign Legion ==
=== Causes ===
The creation of the Legion was largely due to the purge in the army following the July Revolution of 1830. After being installed as a constitutional monarch, King Louis Philippe I required a way to keep dangerous elements of his regular army busy, regardless of whether they were French or foreign nationals. There were also concerns about certain soldiers being foreign insurrectionists or volunteer fighters who had joined the army in the hope of continuing the 1789 Revolution. The Legion came as a solution for those who would not conform to the governing agenda: a way for the French state to contend with the most restless soldiers and keep them under control.

Additionally, the French Invasion of Algiers in 1830 was very unpopular domestically and contributed to low army morale. Louis Philippe I was a pacifist and did not want to defy public opinion by using the French military, nor did he wish to upset his military command by endangering French lives. To overcome these problems, the idea of a Foreign Legion, solely consisting of foreign troops recruited for a specific purpose and organised in a dedicated corps, was born.

=== Creation by Royal Ordinance ===
The Foreign Legion was created by Royal Ordinance on March 9, 1831. The ordinance had nine articles:

Louis-Philippe, roi des Français, à tous présents et à venir salut;

Vu la loi du 9 mars 1831 :

Sur le rapport de notre Ministre Secrétaire d’État au Département de la Guerre : Nous avons ordonné et ordonnons ce qui suit :

Art. 1 – Il sera formé une Légion composée d’Étrangers. Cette Légion prendra la dénomination de Légion Étrangère.
Art. 2 – Les bataillons de la Légion Étrangère auront la même formation que les Bataillons d'infanterie de ligne.
Art. 3 – Pour la solde, les masses et son administration, la Légion Étrangère sera assimilée aux régiments français. L'uniforme sera bleu avec le simple passepoil garance et le pantalon de même couleur, les boutons seront jaunes et porteront les mots Légion Étrangère.
Art. 4 – Tout Étranger qui voudra faire partie de la Légion Étrangère ne pourra y être admis qu'après avoir contracté, devant un sous-intendant militaire, un engagement volontaire.
Art. 5 – La durée de l'engagement sera de trois ans au moins et de cinq ans au plus.
Art. 6 – Pour être reçus à s'engager, les Étranger devront n'avoir pas plus de quarante ans, et avoir au moins dix-huit ans accomplis, et la taille de 1m55. Ils devront en outre être porteur d'un certificat d'acceptation de l'autorité militaire constatant qu'ils ont les qualités requises pour faire un bon service.
Art. 7 – En l'absence de pièces, l’Étranger sera envoyé devant l'Officier Général qui décidera si l'engagement peut être reçu.
Art. 8 – Les militaires faisant partie de la Légion Étrangère se pourront rengager pour deux ans au moins et cinq ans au plus. Les rengagements ne donneront droit à une haute paie qu'autant que les militaires auront accompli cinq ans de service.
Art. 9 – Notre Ministre Secrétaire d’État au Département de la Guerre est chargé de l'exécution de la présente ordonnance. Par le Roi :

Le Ministre Secrétaire d’État de la Guerre Signé : Maréchal SOULT Duc de Dalmatie
signé : LOUIS-PHILIPPE

Translation:

Louis-Philippe, King of the French, to all present and to those to come greetings;

Law decree of March 9, 1831:

On the report of our State Minister Secretary at the Ministry of War: We have ordained and we order as follows:

Art. 1 – A Legion will be formed and composed of foreigners. This Legion will be known as the Foreign Legion.
Art. 2 – The battalions of the Foreign Legion will have the same formation as the line infantry battalions.
Art. 3 – For pay, masses and administration, the Foreign Legion will be assimilated to French regiments. The uniform will be blue with simple passepoil garance and pants of the same color, the buttons will be yellow and inscribed with the words Légion Étrangère.
Art. 4 – Every foreigner who wishes to be part of the Foreign Legion, will only be admitted after having contracted, in front of a deputy superintendent, a volunteer enlistment.
Art. 5 – The duration of the contract of enlistment will be at least three years or a maximum of five years.
Art. 6 – To enlist, foreigners should not be more than forty and should be at least eighteen years old, with a minimum height of 1.55m. They should be attested by and in possession of an acceptance certificate from the competent military authority, who asserts that they have the appropriate qualities for good and proper service.
Art. 7 – In the absence of credentials, the foreigner will be sent to the general officer, who will decide whether his engagement would be acceptable.
Art. 8 – Military personnel of the Foreign Legion can reenlist for a period of two and a maximum of five years. High pay is rightly warranted upon accomplishing five years of service.
Art. 9 – Our State Secretary Minister to the Ministry of War is charged with executing this present ordinance.

The State Secretary War Minister Signed: Marshal SOULT, Duke of Dalmatia
signed: LOUIS-PHILIPPE

=== A challenging start ===
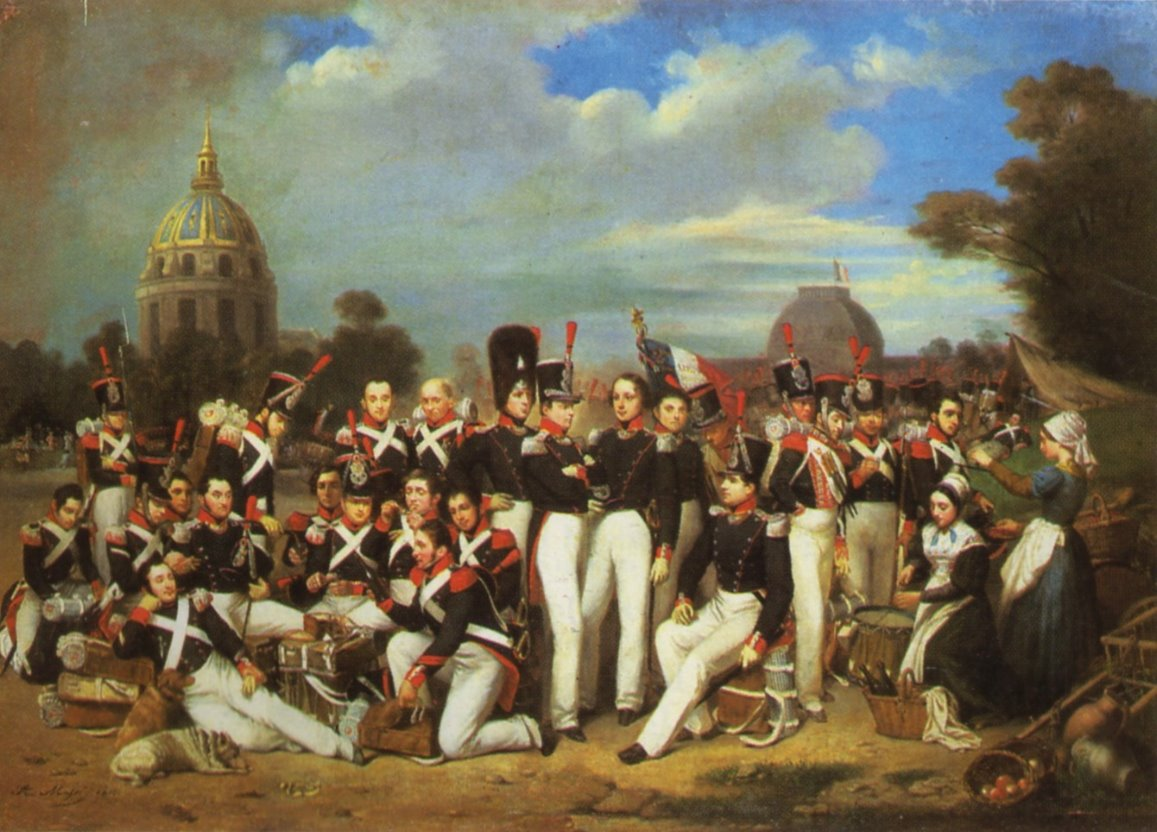
A company of the Legion on the Champ de Mars in Paris (1836).

Though the former Swiss regiments and the Hohenloe regiment formed a professional nucleus within the Legion, the experience of recruits varied greatly. Initially, the Legion attracted foreign nationals from all walks of life and succeeded in its goal of diminishing the number of potential revolutionaries. However, not all who enlisted did so out of the expected, voluntary motives. For example, adventurers enlisted hoping to be sent overseas, especially to Africa, which remained relatively unexplored at the time. The resulting Legion was a motley crew with a wide range of national backgrounds and political orientations. Inevitably, inactivity while waiting for assignments and the nationalism harbored by certain Legionnaires caused internal tensions, soon exposing the lack of cohesion within the Legion.

To compound the Legion's problems, officers and non-commissioned officers were also needed, but those of the former Imperial Army were too old and not adapted to the changing nature of warfare. Newly recruited foreign officers were unfamiliar with the French language and sometimes came from military branches other than the army. Amidst the confusion, insubordination and desertion were common and punishments were harsh. Tensions reached a height in mid-May, when the National Guard was called upon to prevent a possible rebellion. 20 soldiers were arrested.

Despite these complications, less than six months after the proclamation of the royal ordinance, five battalions had been created, each with eight combat companies.

Nationalities by battalion
	nationalities
1st through 3rd	Swiss and former Hohenlohe Regiment or Germans
4th	Spanish
5th	Sardinians and Italians
6th	Belgians and Dutch

=== Early Deployment ===
Starting in August 1831, the 1st, 2nd, 3rd and 5th battalions were deployed to Algeria to aid in the ongoing French conquest. This force consisted of 2,669 Legionnaires and sous-officiers (non-commissioned officers) commanded by 78 officers.

The Legion's first task was the construction of earthworks, which was the birth of the Legion's reputation as pioneers. The Legion would also build the Casbah route in the region of the Emperor's Fort, near Algiers, and participated in the construction of many forts, including the Fort-de-l'Eau (Water Fort). Conditions were harsh; between 1831 and 1835, 3,200 men were killed or discharged as a result of fevers, dysentery and cholera.

=== Baptism by fire ===
On April 7, 1832, 300 men of the 3rd battalion began to secure the area surrounding Algiers and engaged in combat at Maison Carré named including the massacre of El Ouffia. On May 23, a detachment was destroyed, resulting in 26 fatalities. Altogether, the Legion's involvement in the conquest of Algeria cost the Legion 27 officers, 61 sous-officiers and 756 Legionnaires.

That same year, a flag arrived from France, offered by Ferdinand Philippe, Duke of Orléans. Inscribed on the flag was: Le Roi des Français à la Légion étrangère ("The King of the French in the French Foreign Legion"). From then on, the troop became more widely-known and distinguished within the French military.

Still in Algeria, the Legion fought at Sidi Chabal in November 1832, where the Spanish battalion distinguished itself in battle. In March 1833, Legionnaires fought at Ouled Yacoub and Oule Attia, against Emir Emir Abdelkader and the tribes of the Sig.

The Legion won a victory at Arzew on June 5 and took Mostaganem on July 27, 1833.

1835 was marked by fighting at Moulay Ismael in Battle of Macta, which cost the lives of a hundred Legionnaires.

== Spain and the end of the old Legion ==
=== Goodwill to Spain ===
On June 28, 1843, British, Portuguese and French ambassadors to Spain signed a treaty with the Spanish government, affirming their support for Maria Christina and her daughter Queen Isabella II against the Carlist pretender, the Infante Carlos. France was reluctant to interfere in Spanish affairs and risk compromising European peace, and so did not want to send the regular French Army to aid Spain. In the end, sending the Foreign Legion was seen to be the most justifiable course of French involvement.

On January 28, 1835, under pressure from Adolphe Thiers, Minister of Interior, the Legion was ceded to Queen Isabella II. On June 29, a royal ordinance stipulated that the entirety of the Foreign Legion (including the sick, imprisoned, and those on leave) was no longer part of the French Army. Severe sanctions for insubordination were imposed on soldiers who attempted to resist the change.

On July 30, 4,021 sous-officiers and Legionnaires commanded by 123 officers embarked on navy ships towards Spain.

During a stopover at the Balearic Islands, the battalions were reorganized so that all nationalities would be mixed to improve unit cohesiveness.

=== The fighting ===
The Legion in Spain became the French Auxiliary Division and their commander, Colonel Joseph Bernelle, became Maréchal de camp of the Spanish Armies. After several skirmishes against Carlists in Navarre and Aragon, the Legion entered Pamplona on February 5, 1836, to encircle and isolate the province.

The Legion often fought alone and, as a result, slowly became more autonomous. Bernelle supplemented his troops with three squadrons of lancers, a howitzer battery for support, and a medical company, marking the beginning of Foreign Legion in its modern form.

As the fighting progressed, the Legion's losses mounted. On April 15, 1836, 117 had been killed, 380 had died of wounds or disease, and 83 had deserted. At Tirapequi on April 26, 500 Legionnaires repelled 3,500 Carlists at the cost of 90 dead. Later, at Zubiri on August 1, the Legion alone killed 1,200 Carlists in one battle.

=== The Legion abandoned ===
In Spain, the Legion became increasingly isolated, only receiving sporadic reinforcements. Conditions were poor; equipment and supplies were insufficient, pay was irregular, and decorations and promotions were rare. The government in Paris turned a deaf ear to soldiers' concerns; Adolphe Thiers, now Prime Minister, refused them aid, saying that the Legion had been handed in full to Spain. King Louis Philippe I was similarly reluctant and refused to send reinforcements from France's regular army. Resources and troops were needed for the more pressing conquest of Algeria—sending the French army into Spain would further divide and fatigue French troops. Furthermore, the King wanted to avoid France from becoming further entrenched in the Spanish war. Dissatisfied with his government's response, Bernelle resigned and returned to France.

=== Misery and wandering ===
Though the Legion continued to fight, the lack of equipment was aggravated by the bitter winter of 1836–1837 in the plains of Aragon. With their pay in default and their living conditions poor, some even joined the Carlists who were living off the land.

At the beginning of 1837 the Legion had only three battalions, which soon became two; the Legion's size had halved since its arrival in Spain. However, the Legion continued to fight with a suicidal determination.

By 1838, the Legion was a shadow of its former self, living in poor conditions, without resources, and surrounded by Carlists. It was not until December 8 that Isabella II finally granted its dissolution. The Legion left Zaragoza on January 2, 1839, and crossed the Pyrenees back to France, starving and miserable. Out of the approximately 6,000 personnel who had arrived in Spain in 1835, no more than 63 officers and 159 enlisted men returned.

== The new Legion ==
=== Second Legion ===
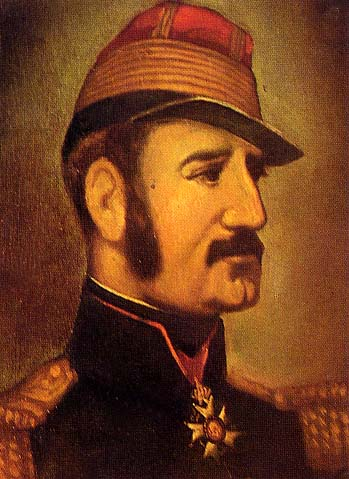
Portrait of Marie Alphonse Bedeau.

The departure of the Legion to Spain in 1835 left a void within the French military, which needed ever-more men for its wars in Africa and Spain. Foreigners remained numerous in France, so a New Legion was formed in December 1835, with its first battalion garrisoned in Paris. On March 22, 1836, two general staff headquarters companies were formed, and on June 26, the battalion was complete. To support the war in Spain, the government dismissed the battalion on August 11, 1836, and sent it to Spain. These were the last reinforcements for the Legionnaires in fighting in the First Carlist War.

The government began to form another battalion in November 1836, which was constituted at Pau on November 21. With 1,200 men, it embarked on the navy ship Suffren on December 11 from Toulon, and arrived four days later in Algiers.

Recruitment continued in France, and on September 4, 1837, a second battalion was constituted by royal decree. Together, the two battalions were the equivalent of a regular infantry regiment.

In 1837, the Legion saw action in a series of battles that culminated in the signing of a peace accord between France and the resistance led by Emir Abdelkader. The stipulations set out in the earlier Treaty of Tafna, which recognized the sovereignty of France in certain Algerian regions, were agreed upon. Despite the treaty, however, the peace was uneasy, and the Legion undertook harsh expeditions in the valley of Isser to reduce rebel activity which extended as far as Boufarik.

=== Battle of Constantine ===
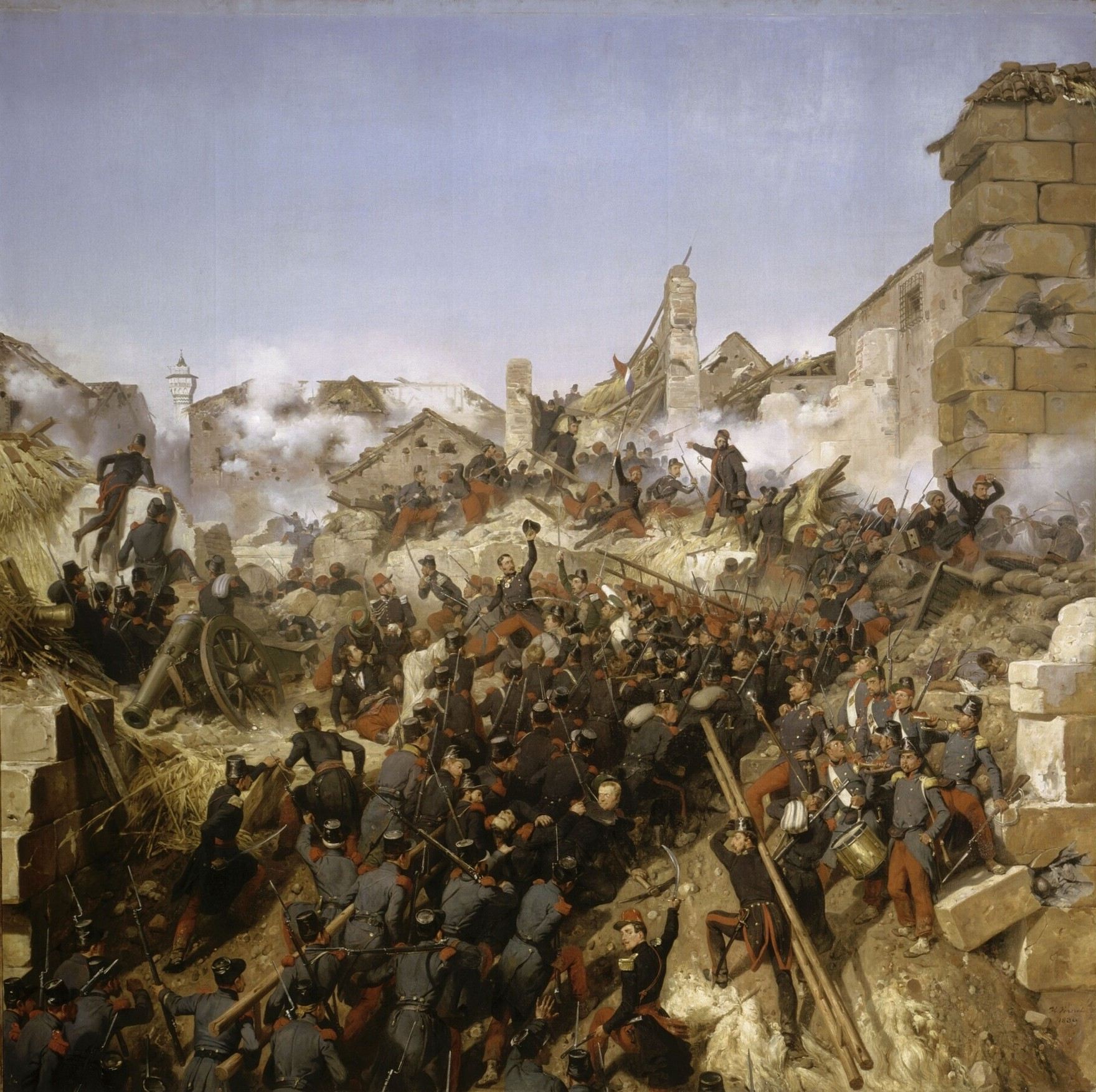
The Siege of Constantine by Horace Vernet, 1838

The relatively calm situation allowed the planning of larger operations, which focused on the Algerian city of Constantine. All available troops marched towards the city, a stronghold overlooking the Rhummel, considered invulnerable.

The fall of the city and its citadel was crucial to French military objectives in the region, especially after the unsuccessful expedition of Bertrand Clauzel. A 500-strong marching battalion was created and placed under the command of chef de bataillon (Commandant-Major) Marie Alphonse Bedeau.

The Legion joined a larger French expeditionary force, which arrived in Constantine on October 6, 1837. Immediately, General Charles-Marie Denys de Damrémont, governor of Algiers, began the siege of the city. The expedition was divided into four brigades; the Legion formed part of the third. The artillery of général Sylvain Charles Valée breached the fortress, and, on October 13, the men launched an assault. The Legionnaires under Colonel Combes, their former chief, engaged in close-quarters hand-to-hand combat, clearing the most important areas. After three hours of fighting, the Legion and the other brigades managed to take Constantine during the night.

Bedeau was designated "Commandant du Lieu" and promoted to Lieutenant-colonel.

=== Posterity ===
The conquest of Algeria was followed by another twenty years of mobilization. After the capture of Constantine, the Legion regrouped in Algiers, numbering 2,823 men on November 10, 1838. It continued to fight, distinguishing itself at Djidjelli, Medea and Miliana, often victorious with heavy losses.

The Legion was permanently garrisoned in Algeria and France in 1840. The Legion expanded, assimilating the survivors of the First Legion and even many of the Carlists who had fled to France after their failed revolution. A reform issued by the intermediary royal ordinance of December 30, 1840, doubled the Legion's size to two Foreign Regiments. The 1st Foreign Regiment, directed by Colonel Mollenbeck, was formed in Algiers on April 1, 1841, while the 2nd Foreign Infantry Regiment, directed by colonel Jean-François de Cariés de Senilhes was formed in Bône on April 21, 1841. The Legion was garrisoned at Sidi Bel Abbès in Algeria in 1843, where it would remain for 119 years, until 1962, when Algeria gained independence from France.

In addition to the French conquest of Algeria, the Legion saw other action overseas to advance French colonial interests, completing successful campaigns in Indochina, Madagascar, Morocco, and other territories that eventually became part of the French empire. According to Blanchard, the Legion became part of colonization "in the professed name of civilization and racial superiority, at a time of rising nationalism and... rivalries between European powers."

== See also ==
- Major (France)
- Foreign Legion Pioneers (Pionniers)
- List of Foreign Legion units
- History of the 2nd Foreign Regiment
- Foreign Legion Command
- Marie Louis Henry de Granet-Lacroix de Chabrières
- Patrice de MacMahon, Duke of Magenta
- François Certain Canrobert
- François Achille Bazaine
- Music of the Foreign Legion (MLE)
- Honneur et Fidélité
