= Armée d'Orient =

The Armée d'Orient was a name used for several historic French field armies:

- Armée d'Orient (1798), a field army of the French Revolutionary Army which participated in the French campaign in Egypt and Syria
- Armée d'Orient (1853), a field army of the French Army field army which participated in the Crimean War
- Armée d'Orient (1915–1919), a field army of the French Army which participated in the Balkans theatre of World War I
