= List of French Foreign Legion units =

This article lists the principal units of the Foreign Legion in the French Army created since 1831. Legion units are only cited once, based on their respective dates of creation. A dissolved Legion unit which is recreated under the same designation will only appear once. The last section of the list re-summarizes actual Legion units in service.

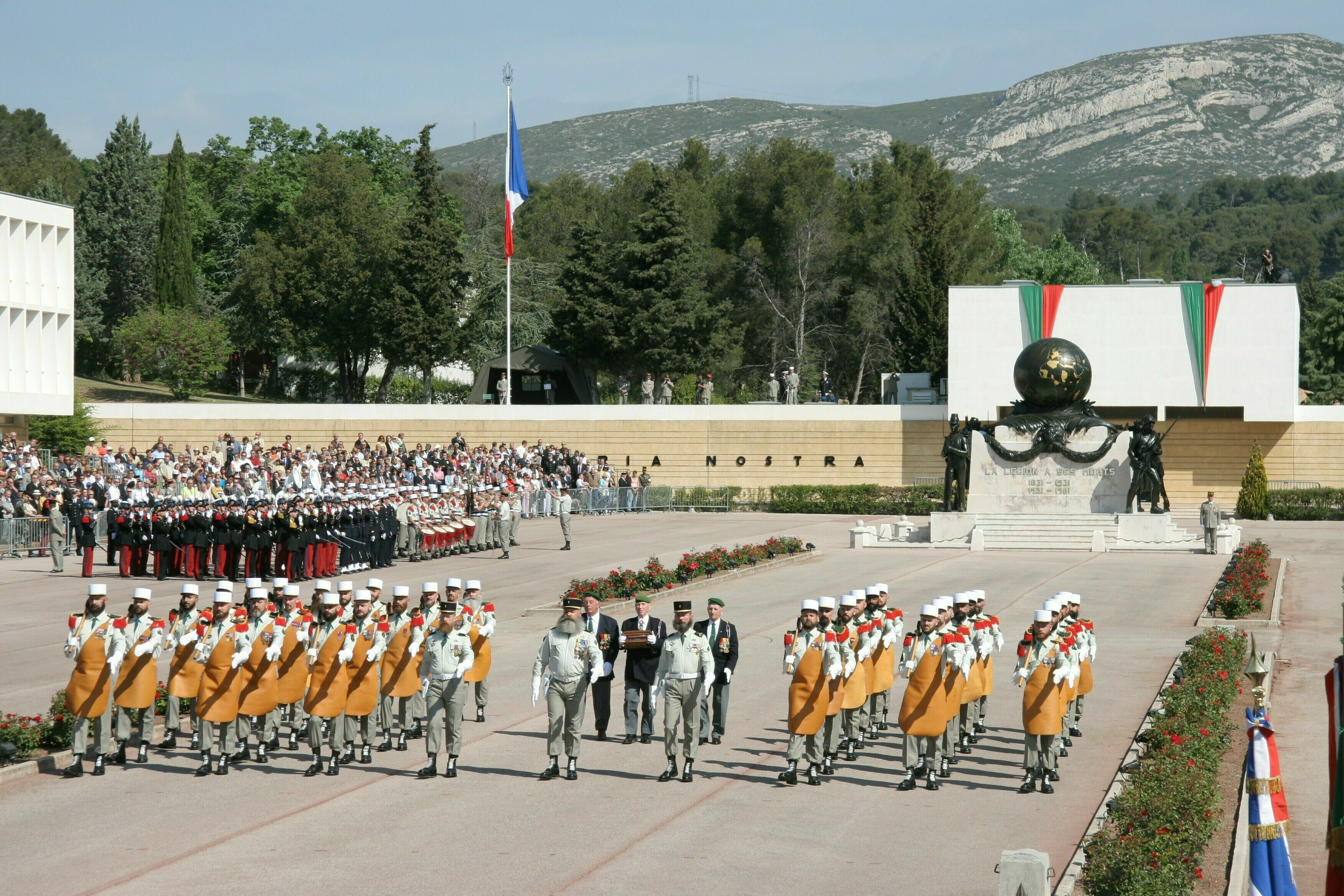
Each year, the Legion commemorates and celebrates Camarón in its headquarters in Aubagne and Bastille Day military parade in Paris; featuring the Pionniers leading and opening the way.

== 19th century ==
- French Foreign Legion (1st formation) – 9 March 1831
- 2nd Foreign Legion (2LE) (2nd formation) – 3 February 1836
- 1st Foreign Regiment – 1 April 1841
- 2nd Foreign Infantry Regiment – 1 April 1841
- Foreign Brigade (unit designation in 1854 for two merged foreign regiments during the Crimean War)
- Mounted Companies (Compagnies montées de la Légion étrangère) – 1881
- Saharan Companies of the French Foreign Legion, Saharan Companies and Squadrons of the French Foreign Legion – (CSPLE, ESPLE) – 1901
- 1st Marching Regiment of the 2nd Foreign Regiment (1^{er}RM 2^{e}RE) – 1907
- 1st Marching Regiment of the 1st Foreign Regiment (1^{e} RM 1^{er} RE) – 1913

== World War I ==
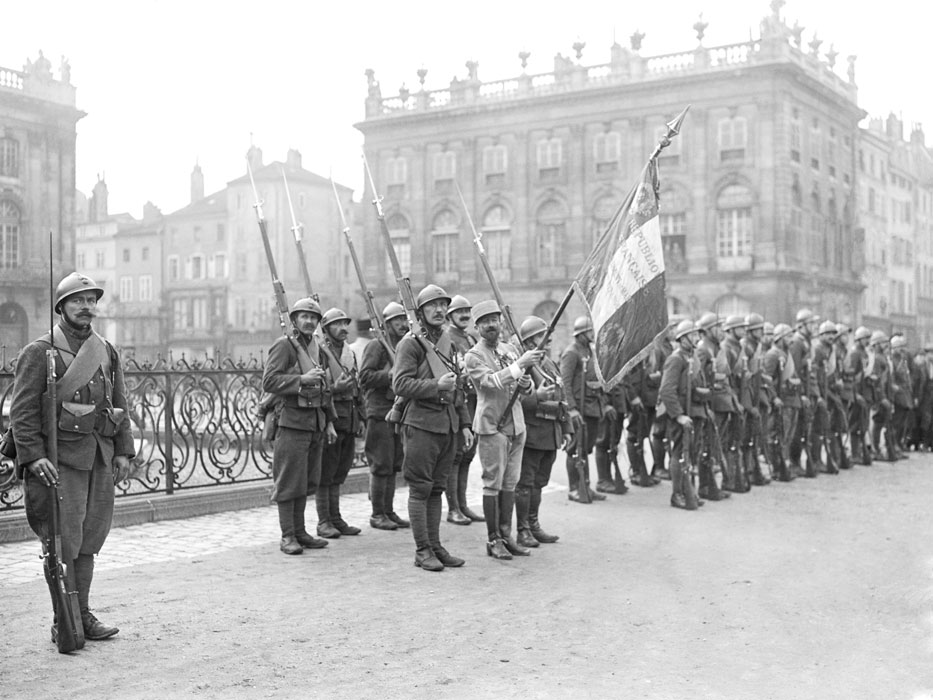
Review of the Marching Regiment of the Foreign Legion (RMLE) at the end of November 1918.

- 2nd Marching Regiment of the 2nd Foreign Regiment (2^{e} RM 2^{e} RE) – end of August 1914
- 2nd Marching Regiment of the 1st Foreign Regiment (2^{e} RM 1^{er} RE) – September 1914
- 3rd Marching Regiment of the 1st Foreign Regiment (3^{e} RM 1^{er} RE) – (first called Marching Regiment of the Foreign Legion entrenched camp of Paris) – September 1914
- 4th Marching Regiment of the 1st Foreign Regiment (4^{e} RM 1^{er} RE) – 5 November 1914
- Marching Regiment of the Foreign Legion (RMLE) – 11 November 1915

== Interwar period ==
- 3rd Foreign Infantry Regiment (3^{e} RE), ex-RMLE – 15 November 1920
- 4th Foreign Infantry Regiment (4^{e} REI) – 15 November 1920
- 1st Foreign Cavalry Regiment (1^{er} REC) – 1921
- Demi-Brigade of the Foreign Legion in Indochina (DBLE) – 2 August 1930
- 5th Foreign Infantry Regiment (5^{e} REI) – 1 September 1930
- Foreign Legion Command (COMLE) – successive appellations and designations IILE (1931), GALE (1950), COLE (1955), TITLE (1957), GLE (1972) and COMLE (1984) – 1 April 1931.
- Communal Depot of the Foreign Regiments – successive appellations and designations DCRE (1933) and DCLE (1950) – 13 October 1933.
- 2nd Foreign Cavalry Regiment – 1 July 1939

== World War II ==
- Marching Regiments of Foreign Volunteers (1^{er}, 2^{e} and 3^{e} RMVE) – 29 September 1939, became the 21^{e}, 22^{e}, 23^{e} RMVE
- 6th Foreign Infantry Regiment (6^{e} REI) – 1 October 1939
- 11th Foreign Infantry Regiment (11^{e} REI) – 6 November 1939
- 97th Reconnaissance Group of the Infantry Division – GRD 97 (first called GRDI 180) – 1 December 1939
- 12th Foreign Infantry Regiment (12^{e} REI) – 24 February 1940
- 13th Demi-Brigade of the Foreign Legion (13^{e} DBLE) (first called 13th Light Mountain Demi-Brigade) – became the 13^{e} DBLE on 12 November 1940
- 21st Marching Regiment of Foreign Volunteers – (21^{e} RMVE) – first called 1^{er} RMVE – 29 September 1939
- 22nd Marching Regiment of Foreign Volunteers (22^{e} RMVE) first called 2^{e} RMVE – 24 October 1939
- 23rd Marching Regiment of Foreign Volunteers (23^{e} RMVE) – first called 3^{e} RMVE – May 1940

== Decolonization ==
=== Indochina War ===
- Disciplinary Company of the Foreign Regiments in the Far East (CDRE/EO) – 1 June 1946
- Passage Company of the Foreign Legion (CPLE) of the Far East – 1 May 1947
- Armored Train of the Foreign Legion (TBLE) – 1948
- Parachute Company of the 3rd Foreign Infantry Regiment – Para Co. 3rd Foreign Infantry Regiment (3^{e} REI) – 1 April 1948 – later designations: 1st Foreign Parachute Battalion (1^{er} BEP)
- 1st Foreign Parachute Regiment – later names and designations: 1st Foreign Parachute Battalion (1^{er} BEP) – 1948 and (1^{er} REP) – 1955 – 1 July 1948
- 2nd Foreign Parachute Regiment – successive appellations and designations, 2^{e} BEP (1948) and 2^{e} REP (1955) – 9 October 1948.
- 3rd Foreign Parachute Regiment – successive appellations and designations, 3rd Foreign Parachute Battalion (3^{e} BEP – 1949 and 3^{e} REP – 1955) – November 1949
- Foreign Air Supply Company (CERA) – 1 January 1951
- 1st Foreign Parachute Heavy Mortar Company (1^{re} CEPML) – 1 September 1953

== After 1962 ==
- 61st Mixed Legion Engineer Battalion – 61^{e} BMGL – 1963
- 5th Mixed Regiment of the Pacific 5^{e} RMP (ex-5^{e} REI) – October 1963.
- 5th Heavy Weight Transport Company (CTGP) – 5^{e} CTGP – 1 May 1965.
- Foreign Legion Detachment in Mayotte successive designations and appellations DLEC (1973) and DLEM (1975) – 2 August 1973.
- 6th Foreign Engineer Regiment – 6^{e} REG – 1 July 1984.
- 1st Foreign Engineer Regiment – 1^{er} REG (ex-6^{e} REG) – 1 July 1999.
- 2nd Foreign Engineer Regiment – 2^{e} REG – 1 July 1999.
- Foreign Legion Recruiting Group – GRLE – 1 July 2007.

== Current Legion units ==
- Commandement de la Légion étrangère – COMLE.
- Groupement de recrutement de la Légion étrangère (GRLE)
- 1er Régiment étranger (1^{er} RE)
- 1er Régiment Étranger de Cavalerie (1^{er} REC)
- 1er Régiment étranger de génie (1^{e} REG)
- 2e Régiment étranger de parachutistes (2^{e} REP)
- 2e Régiment étranger de infanterie (2^{e} REI)
- 2e Régiment Etranger de Génie (2^{e} REG)
- 3e Régiment étranger d'infanterie (3^{e} REI)
- 4e Régiment étranger (4^{e} RE)
- 13e Demi-Brigade de Légion Étrangère (13^{e} DBLE)
- Détachement de Légion étrangère de Mayotte
- Musique de la Légion étrangère (MLE)

== See also ==
- Major (France)
- Origins of the French Foreign Legion
- History of the French Foreign Legion

== Sources ==
- Le Livre d’Or de la Légion étrangère (1831–1955) (Golden Book of the Legion 1831–1955), Jean Brunon et Georges Manue, éditions Charles Lavauzelle et Cie, 1958.
- Histoire de la Légion, de Narvik à Kolwesi, (The History of the Legion from Narvik to Kolwesi), Henri Le Mire, éditions Albin Michel, 1978, ISBN 2-226-00694-X
- Division Communication et Information de la Légion étrangère (Communication and Information Division of the French Foreign Legion).
- Division Histoire et Patrimoine de la Légion étrangère (History and Patrimony Division of the French Foreign Legion).
- Monsieur Légionnaire – Général (cr) Hallo Jean – Lavauzelle – 1994
- Centre de documentation de la Légion étrangère (Center of Documentation of the French Foreign Legion).
