= André Le Vert =

French general

- Born: 23 April 1914; France
- Died: 22 August 2006 (aged 92); France
- Military career
- Allegiance: France
- Branch: French Army; French Foreign Legion
- Service years: 1932 – 1971
- Rank: Général de brigade

André Georges Le Vert (23 April 1914 – 22 August 2006) was a French general who served most of his career in the French Foreign Legion. He held the rank of général de brigade.

== Military career ==
André Le Vert succeeded to an early admission at École spéciale militaire de Saint-Cyr in 1932. Commissioned as a Sous-lieutenant in 1934, he was assigned to the 21st Infantry Regiment (French: 21^{e} Régiment d'Infanterie) until 1936, date in which he was promoted to a Lieutenant and assigned to the 171st Infantry Fortress Regiment (French: 171^{e} Régiment d'Infanterie de Forteresse).

In 1939, he was assigned to the Legion. He would remain in the Legion until 1965. Assigned as section chief (French: chef de section) at the 1st Foreign Regiment 1^{er} RE, he served successively at the instruction and transmissions company, the Pionniers company and the 3rd company. In July 1941, he was sent in reinforcement to Syria; however, the end of combats obliged him to turn around and head back again to Algeria.

In December 1941, he embarked in destination to Senegal where he joined the regimental company of the 4th Demi-Brigade of the Foreign Legion (4^{e} DBLE) in quality as transmission section chief. On 25 December 1942 he was promoted to captain.

In March 1943, the 4^{e} DBLE left Senegal and headed to Morocco where the demi-brigade became the 1st Foreign Marching Infantry Regiment 1^{er} REIM. He accordingly assumed command of the CCB and then that of 12th company.

He then went with his unit to Tunisia, where, as a transmission chief, he participated to the victory. At the dissolution of the REIM, he was assigned to the Marching Regiment of the Foreign Legion (RMLE).

On 25 March 1943 Captain Le Vert assumed command of the 10th company. In September 1944, he disembarked in Provence (French: Débarquement de Provence). During combats led by the RMLE for the liberation of France, André Le Vert was wounded on 21 November in front of Belfort and gained accordingly his first citation. He ten partook to the campaign of Germany (French: Allemagne) until the end of the campaign.

The RMLE became the 3rd Foreign Infantry Regiment 3^{e} REI which disembarked in the Far East at the end of the war in Europe. André Le Vert was decorated was twice on the eastern theatre.

A graduate of the Superior War School (French: École supérieure de guerre), he was promoted to chef de bataillon (Commandant - Major) in April 1952 during a second tour in Indochina. He then accordingly assumed the command of the 5th battalion of the 3^{e} REI before assuming the functions of the general staff headquarters of the regiment. At the end of his tour in Asia, he went back to Europe and was assigned at the general staff headquarters of the French Forces in Germany.

In 1957, he was assigned to the 110th Infantry Regiment (French: 110^{e} RI), in Algeria and was promoted to lieutenant-colonel. Commandant in second (deputy) of the regiment, he was decorations again for his actions under fires.

After two years as an instructor at the war school, he went back to the Legion in 1962. Commandant in second (deputy) of the 1st Foreign Infantry Regiment 1^{er} REI, he commanded the precursor company which took possession of the camp de la Demande at Aubagne during the continental moving of the regiment to metropolis.

Promoted to colonel on 1 April 1963, he was designated as regimental commander of the 2nd Foreign Infantry Regiment 2^{e} REI in July of the same year. The regiment during this époque was mainly in charge of surveillance missions around sensitive sites in the Southern Territory of Algeria. Following his command, André Le Vert was assigned to the general staff headquarters of the military subdivision of Aisne.

In 1971, he was admitted to the 2nd section of officer generals.

Commander of the Legion d'honneur in 1965, he is titular of the Croix de guerre 1939–1945, the Croix de guerre des théâtres d'opérations extérieures and the croix de la Valeur militaire.

== See also ==
- Armored Train of the Foreign Legion
- Saharan Companies of the French Foreign Legion
- Passage Company of the Foreign Legion (CPLE)
- 5th Heavy Weight Transport Company (CTGP)
