= Lecerf =

Lecerf is a French surname. Notable people with the surname include:

- Alfred Lecerf (1948–2019), Belgian politician
- Antoine Lecerf (1950–2011), French general
- Jean-René Lecerf (born 1951), French politician
- Olivier Lecerf (1928–2006), French businessman and racehorse owner
