= Saharan Companies of the French Foreign Legion =

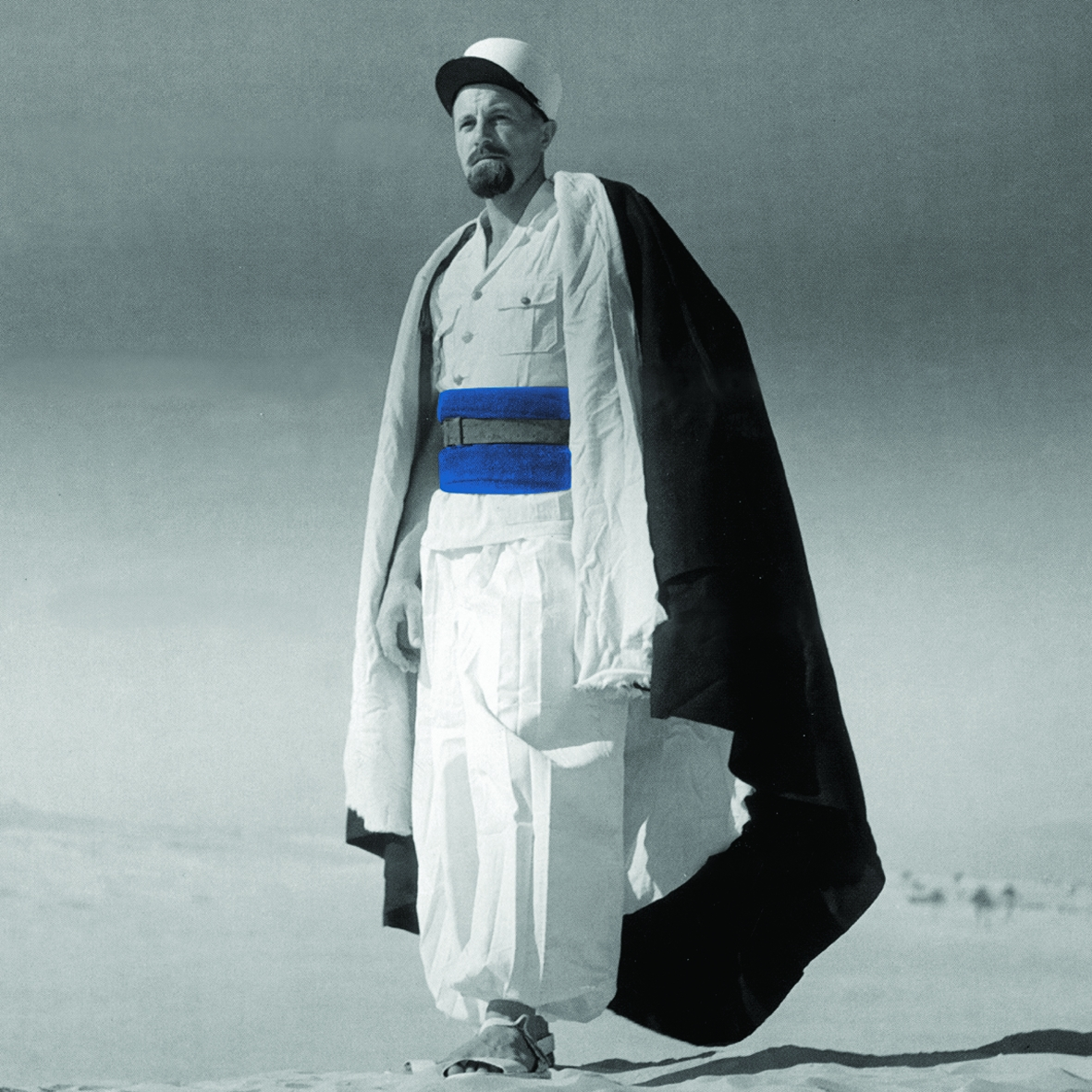
A Legionnaire of the Saharan Mounted Companies. Blue or red sashes of the pattern shown were worn by all units of the Army of Africa; the Legion however, officially adopted the Ceinture Bleue (blue sash) in 1882.

The Saharan Mounted Companies of the Foreign Legion consisted of legionnaires of various nationalities and races transferred from the existing Foreign Legion infantry and cavalry regiments. These units were different from the Saharan Méharistes Companies (a separate camel corps with Arab/Berbers personnel recruited from Algeria, Tunisia and Morocco, with French officers).

== History since 1800 ==
A camel regiment (Régiment de Dromadaires) was created by Napoleon Bonaparte during the Egyptian Campaign in 1799 and 1801.

Following the French occupation of Algeria, the use of mules and camels for military purposes was trialled between 1843 and 1848. Mules continued to be used for carrying supplies but no operational requirements justifying the employment of camels emerged until French expansion reached the boundaries of the Sahara.

The first military-mule units were created in 1885, during the occupation of South-Oran. They were organized in units of 250 men, each divided into two platoons of two section. Each mule was shared between two soldiers, carrying their equipment as well as one man at a time. The pair of soldiers would alternate between riding and walking, for long-distance marches. The mule companies were established as permanent units in 1901 at the initiative of Commandant François-Henry Laperrine. Their designations, numbers and areas of operation changed with time. These mule units were generally employed as and where needed, and were not permanently stationed in specific territories.

The law of March 30, 1902 created five Saharan companies. Three other companies formed of four platoons each already existed in the French Levant as well as nomadic groups in French West Africa. The latter were based respectively at Fort-Polignac (Tassili), Tindouff, El Oued, Adrar, and Tamanrasset. These mule and camel companies were commanded by officers of the Indigenous Affairs Bureau and depended on the directorate of the infantry. Each of the Méhariste (camel mounted) units included 68 dromedaries (Méharis).

However, several Mounted Saharan Companies where created at Ouargla, Columb-Becharm and Ain Sefra, Laghouat and Sebha for Mounted Saharan Companies of the Foreign Legion (CSPLE).

Later, these companies were merged to form four distinct companies of Mounted Saharan Companies of the Foreign Legion (CSPL).

Although it had no connection with the Foreign Legion, a Méharistes Company was also created in 1921 in Palmyra during the French Mandate for Syria and the Lebanon under the designation of 1st Méhariste Company of the Levant. Recruited from locally recruited personnel with mostly French officers, the company became in 1936 the 1st Light Desert Company (French: 1^{ére} Compagnie Légère du Désert) and was dissolved in June 1945.

== Saharan units of the Foreign Legion ==
=== 1st company ===
On November 1, 1940, the Automobile Company of the 1st Foreign Infantry Regiment (1^{er} REI) became an autonomous unit, designated as the Mounted Saharan Company of the Legion (Compagnie Saharienne Portée de la Légion, CSPL). (Note: in the French language, the designation of "Mounted Company" (Compagnie Portée) could refer to motorized, camel or horse mounted units. The designation of "Motorized Company" (Compagnie Motorisé), by contrast, was strictly applied to motor transport. The designation "Mounted" Saharan Companies (Compagnie Saharienne "Portée") is however also used in respect of motorized units equipped with 75mm artillery.) The company first garrisoned at Tabelbala then Aïn Sefra from March 1944.

On March 15, 1946, the company formed two new companies being the 1st Mounted Saharan Company of the Legion (1^{re}CSPL) and the 2nd Mounted Saharan Company of the Legion (2^{e}CSPL). The 1st Mounted Saharan Company of the Legion (1^{re} CSPL) garrisoned at Fort-Flatters in 1955 then at Ksar El Hirane in 1960. On January 1, 1961, the 1st Mounted Saharan Company of the Legion (1^{re} Compagnie Saharienne Portée de la Légion, 1^{re} CSPL) became the 1st Mounted Saharan Squadron of the Foreign Legion (1^{er} Escadron Saharien Porté de la Légion Etrangère, 1^{er} ESPLE).

=== 1st squadron ===
Equipped with light armor (French: Véhicule militaire blindé), the squadron was assimilated to a unit of the Armored Corps (French: Arme blindée et cavalerie) within armament.

This unit formed a corps and was independent at the same title of an actual regiment, much as its equipment as well as its missions. The squadron was stationed at ksar El Hirane, near Laghouat and mounted police patrols in the desert as well launched raids on spotted positions of the enemy.

In 1961, following the generals putsch, the 1st Mounted Saharan Squadron of the Foreign Legion was charged with guarding arrested civilian and military participants, before their repatriation to France.

In August 1962, the 1st Mounted Saharan Squadron of the Foreign Legion (French: 1^{er} Escadron Saharien Porté de la Légion Etrangère, 1^{er} ESPLE) lost three men in action, including lieutenant Gélas. These were the last French fatalities of the Algerian War.

Stationed at Reggane and at Aoulef since July 1962, the squadron was dissolved and integrated into the 2nd Foreign Infantry Regiment (2^{e} REI) on March 1, 1963. On this date the newly integrated squadron became the regiment's 7th mounted company (French: 7^{e} compagnie portée).

Commandants of 1^{re} ESPLE

- Capitaine Gaud: January 1, 1961 - May 18, 1961
- Lieutenant Lajouaine: May 18, 1961 - end of June 1961 (interim)
- Capitaine Vonderheyden : End of June 1961 - March 1, 1963
- Capitaine Sukic : May 1, 1962 - March 1, 1963

=== 2nd company ===
The 2nd Mounted Saharan Company of the Legion (French: 2^{e} Compagnie Saharienne Portée de la Légion, 2^{e} CSPL) was created on March 15, 1946 by doubling the Mounted Saharan Company of the Legion (CSPL) and garrisoned at Ouargla, then in 1948 garrisoned at Laghouat.

In 1954, the company intervened in Gafsa in Tunisia then participated to the war in Algeria.

Dissolved on March 31, 1963, the company became the 1st mounted company of the 4th Foreign Infantry Regiment (4^{e} REI).

=== 3rd company ===
The 3rd Mounted Saharan Company of the Legion (French: 2^{e} Compagnie Saharienne Portée de la Légion, 3^{e} CSPL) was created on February 1, 1949 in French Algeria at Sidi-bel-Abbas and garrisoned at Fort Leclerc near the oasis of Sebha where the latter was charged with the surveillance of Fezzan until 1956 before rejoining the department of the Oasis.

The unit was dissolved on March 31, 1963 and the company became the 7th then 3rd mounted company of the 4th Foreign Infantry Regiment (4^{e} REI).

The poet Pierre-Eugène Bourgin (French: Pierre-Eugène Bourgin) who signed his work under the pseudonym Von Palaïeff, served in this unit.

=== 4th company ===
The 4th Mounted Saharan Company of the Legion (French: 2^{e} Compagnie Saharienne Portée de la Légion, 3^{e} CSPL) was formed on January 1, 1956 at Ain-Sefra from the 24^{e} CPLE dissolved during the same date. The unit garrisoned at Colomb-Béchar since 1957.

Dissolved on March 31, 1963, the company became the 2nd mounted company of the 2nd Foreign Infantry Regiment (2^{e} REI).

=== Chest insignias ===
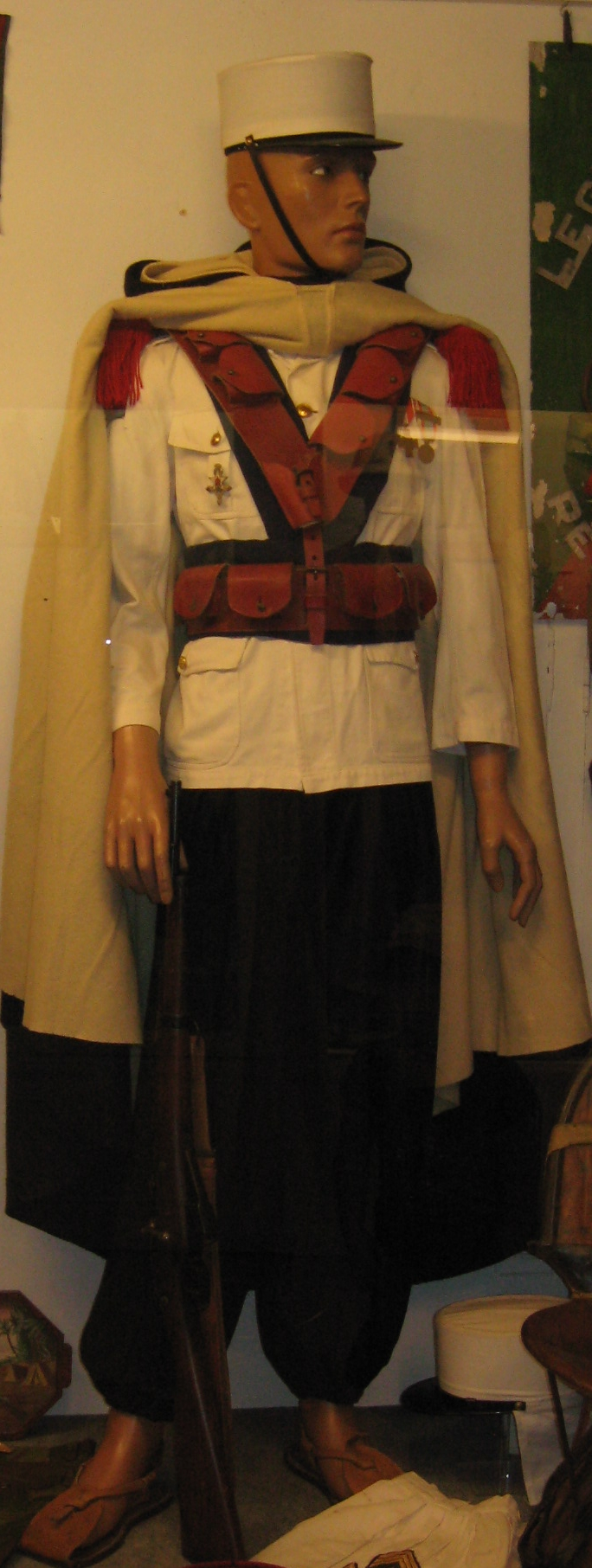
Tenue of a Legionnaire of the Mounted Saharan Company of the Legion, 2^{e} CSPL

These chest insignias do not include the beret, military patches and artillery batteries insignias of the Mounted Saharan Company of the Legion.

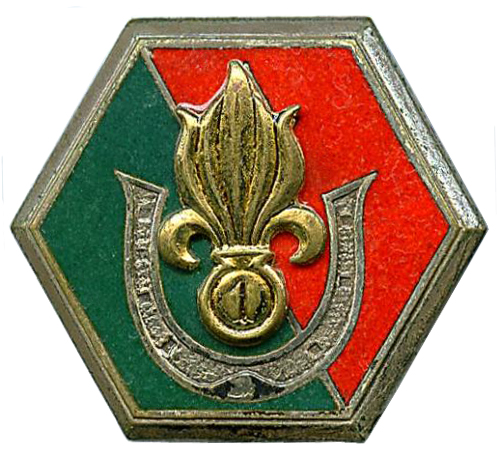
1st Mounted Saharan Company of the Legion, 1^{re} CSPL

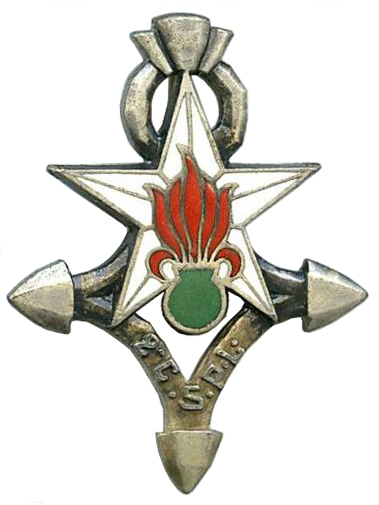
2nd Mounted Saharan Company of the Legion, 2^{e} CSPL

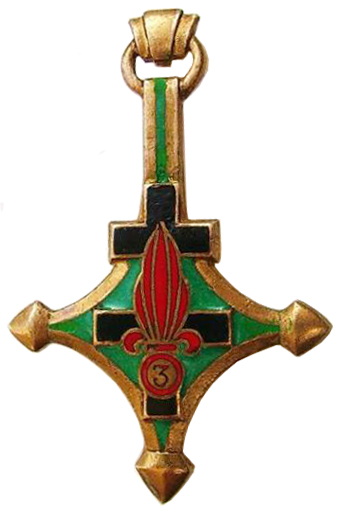
3rd Mounted Saharan Company of the Legion, 3^{e} CSPL

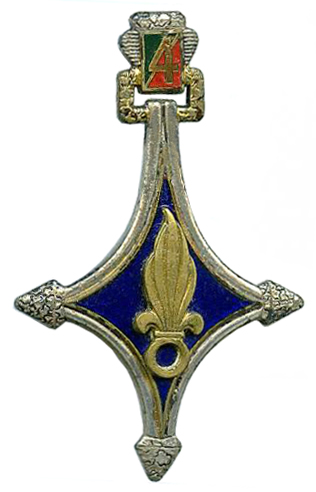
4th Mounted Saharan Company of the Legion, 4^{e} CSPL

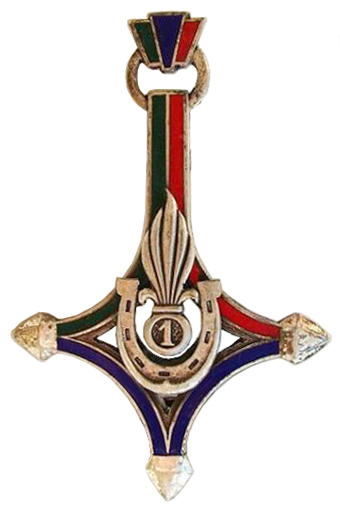
1st Mounted Saharan Squadron of the Foreign Legion 1^{er} ESPLE

== Organization ==
=== Méharistes companies ===
At their creation in 1902 these companies consisted of infantrymen mounted on mules. They were originally recruited from indigenous Algerian tirailleurs. Separate units of méharistes consisted of locally recruited (Arab and Berber) personnel mounted on Arabian Camels or Méharis) When created during the 1930s the 5th CSP was motorized, making use of vehicles specially adapted for desert conditions.

The various Saharan Companies varied in size and numbers according to their differing roles and personnel (i.e. French, Legion or indigenous). They generally included a command platoon and two to four sections, making up a total formation of 142 to 178 men.

=== Mounted Saharian Companies (CSP) ===
All five of these companies were organized within the same structure:

- 1 command section
- 1 platoon with light armored wheeled vehicle (Automitrailleuse)
- 3 mounted sections of Fusiliers-Voltigeurs
- 1 section of artillery cannon type 75mm (mainly the Canon de 75 modèle 1897)

They counted 195 men with light armored vehicles M8 Greyhound types, 4x4 types and 6x6 type wheels amongst others.

=== Saharan Annexes Groupment ===
- Saharan Annex Groupment of Algeria

In Algeria, four Saharans Annex Groupment constituted police forces assigned in support to the posts south of the territory. They were in general stationed at Touggourt, Colomb-Béchar, Laghouat, Ouargla, and counted each 320 men.

- Saharan Groupment of South Tunisia

This groupment which consisted of a command peloton, three méharistes platoons and four motorized platoons, counted almost 720 men, all ranks mixed, plus 100 Arabian Camels and 80 vehicles.

=== Saharan infantry companies of Fezzan ===
This unit was created by France after the Second World War to control the former Italian colonies. The unit was stationed at Sebha and counted 300 men and numerous vehicles.

== Uniform ==
The uniform of the Saharan Companies of the Foreign Legion (CSPLE) combined traditional features of both the Legion itself and the camel mounted méhariste units.

Following the Second World War, the white and blue uniform shown was retained as a parade uniform only, being replaced for regular duties by khaki drill and kepi cover.

== Saharan Méharistes Companies ==
The Saharan Méharistes Companies (Compagnies Méharistes Sahariennes) were locally recruited camel mounted units of the French Armed Forces employed to patrol and control the territories of the Sahara bordering on Algeria, Tunisia and Morocco during the period of French rule. Organized in companies (compagnies) or squadrons ( escadrons méhariste) units, they made use of Arabian camels in terrain which early motor vehicles could not traverse. Their roles included the pacification of the Touareg tribal zones, the undertaking of topographical exploration and mapping work, the surveillance of caravans and settled regions, and border surveillance.

== See also ==
- Mounted Companies (Compagnies montées de la Légion étrangère)
- Armored Train of the Foreign Legion
- Disciplinary Company of the Foreign Regiments in the Far East
- 5th Heavy Weight Transport Company
- 6th Foreign Infantry Regiment
- Jean Olié
- Pierre Segrétain
- Pierre Jeanpierre
- Jacques Lefort
- Paul Lardy
