= Jacques Servranckx =

Jacques Servranckx

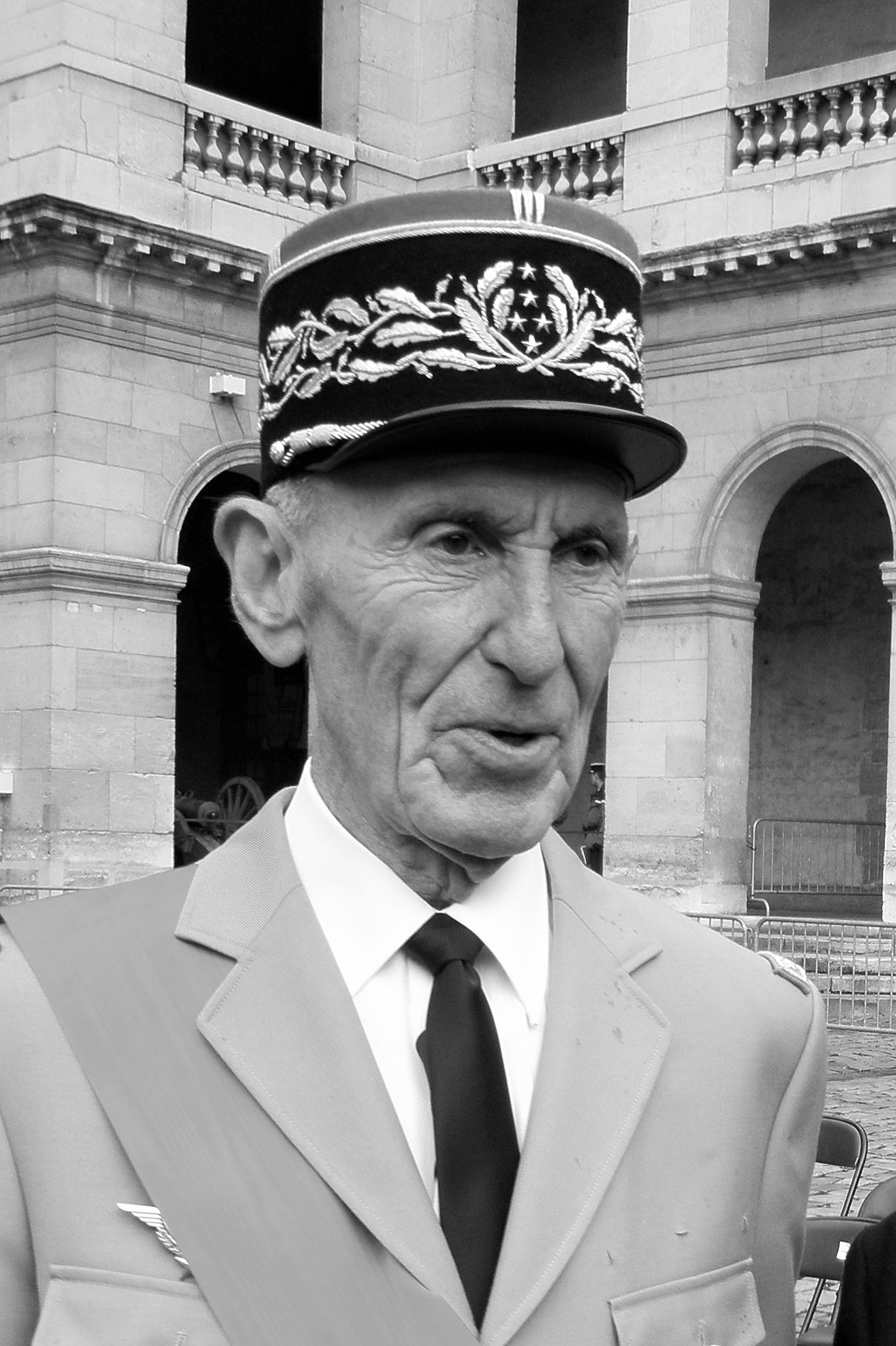
- Général Jacques Servranckx (age 79) at Les Invalides in 2007.
- Born: 21 January 1928; Belgium, Etterbeek
- Died: 16 May 2017 (aged 89); Paris, France
- Military career
- Allegiance: France
- Branch: French Army; French Foreign Legion
- Service years: 1947 - 1988
- Rank: Général d'armée
- Commands: 2nd Foreign Regiment; 2^{e} RE; 2nd Armored Division; 2^{e} DB
- Conflicts: Indochina War; Algerian War

Jacques Servranckx (21 January 1928 in Belgium – 16 May 2017 in Paris France), was a French general that has served an entire career in the French Foreign Legion then the French Army.

== Military career ==
French naturalized in 1936 following the naturalization of his father, he integrated École spéciale militaire de Saint-Cyr, promotion « Nouveau Bahut », between 1945 and 1947. He then joined in 1948 the École de l'infanterie (French: école de l'infanterie) where he served successively as a student-officer then instructor. He then commanded sections of reserve infantry student officers at ESMIA.

Volunteer for reinforcements of the French Foreign Legion destined for the Far East, he was assigned to the 1st Foreign Infantry Regiment 1^{er} REI which he rejoined in 1949 at Sidi Bel Abbès. At his arrival in Saigon, he was assigned to the 2nd Foreign Infantry Regiment 2^{e} REI and received the command of the intervention section of the Armored Train of the Northern Zone. Wounded by an explosive mine in 1950, he was repatriated to France. He went back to Indochina in September 1951, was assigned to the 5th Foreign Infantry Regiment 5^{e} REI and participated to all combats led in the Tonkin (French: Tonkin). Severely wounded in 1954, he was repatriated again to Paris. « He was 26 years old, and made a knight of the legion d'honneur (since 20 January 1953) and already titled 7 citations. »

Following a passage at the École de l'infanterie, he was admitted in 1957 to the staff headquarters school and was assigned at his course completion to the 2nd Foreign Regiment 2^{e} RE in Algeria. From 1960 to 1963, he was part of the general staff headquarters of the commander-in-chief of the French Forces in Germany, FFA (French: Forces française en Allemagne) at Baden-Baden. Admitted to the Superior War School (French: école supérieure de guerre), he received in 1965 the commandment of the promotion of « Lieutenant-colonel Émile Driant (French: Émile Driant) » at Saint-Cyr.

He was assigned from 1968 to 1972 at the general staff headquarters of the French Army, them assumed command of the 2nd Foreign Regiment 2^{e} RE, in Corsica. He would then occupy successively the functions of assistant commandant of the 3rd Infantry Division (French: 3^{e} Division d'Infanterie) at Fribourg-en-Brisgau (1974-1977), regimental commander of the 4th Motorized Brigade at Beauvais (1977-1979), Deputy Chief of Operations at the general staff headquarters of the Armies at Paris (1979-1981), Division Commander of the 2nd Armored Division 2^{e} DB (French: 2^{e} Division Blindée) at Versailles from (1981-1983) and finally Region Commander of the 3rd Military Region (1984-1988).

After having left active duty service, he presided over the National Association of the French Souvenir (French: Souvenir français) from 1992 until 1997 and was the Honorary President of the National Association of the Croix de Guerre and La Valeur Militaire (French: Association nationale des croix de guerre et de la valeur militaire) from 1990 to 1998. He then dedicated himself to research work on the list of Officers, from Saint-Cyr, whom were subject of "Resistance" or "Deportations" (French: Resistance ou Deportation) from 1941 to 1945.

In 2000, he was the ceremonial chief of the Legion's commemoration of Camarón.

== Family ==
Jacques Servranckx was married and had five children.

His brother Jean Sevranckx, polytechnic (French: polytechnicien) in 1938, a military engineer in the national arms manufacturing industry, was deported for Resistance and died at Mauthausen-Gusen in February 1945.

== Recognitions and Honors ==

Général Servranckx bares wearing at an individual title the French Fourragere of the Croix de guerre des théâtres d'opérations extérieures.

== See also ==
- Armored Train of the Foreign Legion
