= Fort Leclerc =

Military fort in Sebha, Libya

Fort Leclerc is a military fort at the town of Sebha, Libya.

The fort was originally built by the Italians. It came under control of the French Foreign Legion during World War II when General Leclerc and Free French Forces invaded Italian Libya in 1943. In June 1949 the fort was attacked by local rebels.
