= Passage Company of the Foreign Legion (CPLE) =

Passage Company of the Foreign Legion in the Far East Compagnie de Passage de la Légion étrangère (CPLE)
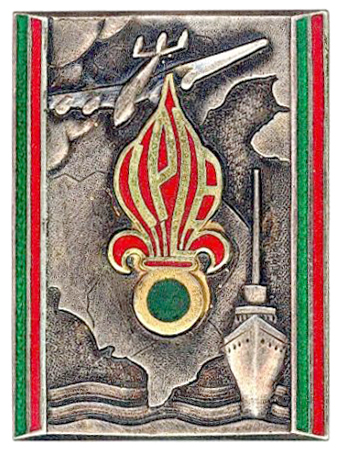
- Passage Company of the Far East Insignia
- Active: 1 May 1947 - 31 October 1955
- Country: France
- Branch: (France) French Army
- Type: Foreign Legion Passage Company & Air and Sea Transport
- 7 Flames Grenade, Ship, Aircraft: CPLE

The Passage Company of the Foreign Legion (French: Compagnie de Passage de la Légion étrangère (CPLE)) of Saigon was a logistics handling operation of the French Foreign Legion, in Cochinchina, and based at fort de Cay May. In 1950, the CPLE of Saigon counted (years where the units of the Legion in Indochina amounted to 20,000 men) 21,389 passengers of all ranks, the company also registered 14 tons of baggage and almost 125,000 letters transmitted.

Passengers passing by Fort of Cay May would find numerous services available to them on base. There was a lobby (with a lounge area and a small sundries shop), an Information Center, a library, a Literacy Center that taught reading and writing, a barber shop, sports fields, and a 500-seat cinema. The CPLE, which depended on the military base of Saigon, received a satisfactory rating for the company's action during the French withdrawal. The unit was dissolved on 31 October 1955.

== Insignia ==
Silver rectangle bordered by green and red stripes, at the center, on a geographical map representing the southern part of Indochina. A grenade with 7 flames with a green filled bomb and red flames surrounded by gold, on which is featured the inscription « C.P.L.E », in golden letters; at the bottom, a ship at sea; at the top a quadrimotor aircraft. The grenade with 7 flames and the green and red are the symbols of Legion; the ship and the plane evoke the vocation of the unit; the grenade placed on southern Indochinese part of the map indicated the precise garrison of the unit. The insignia was created in 1948.

== See also ==
- French Foreign Legion Music Band (MLE)
- Armored Train of the Foreign Legion
- 5th Heavy Weight Transport Company
- Disciplinary Company of the Foreign Regiments in the Far East
