= Mounted Companies (Légion étrangère) =

The Legion Mounted Companies were infantry companies from the French Foreign Legion mounted on mules. While the infantry was very efficient in the Aurès, Kabylie and other mountainous regions, they were slowed when the terrain became flat in the desert. At the end of the 19th century, the 2nd Foreign Regiment (2^{e} REI) set the mounted companies on foot in order to allow these infantry to move over long distances while avoiding fatigue.

Horses could not move for long distances in the desert without water supply, therefore others means of movement were required.

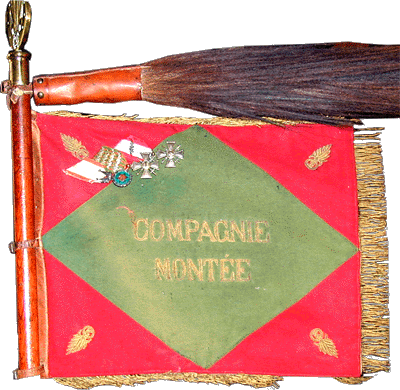
Fanion of the mounted company of the 2^{e} REI.

== Origin and history since 1881 ==
At the end of 1880, in Algeria, French troops started to occupy the oasis in the south, around the Saharan border. However, these forward operating posts had to be filled with supplies which made the convoys supplying them a target.

The first Legion mule mounted unit was created by colonel de Négrier, regimental commander of the 2nd Foreign Regiment in 1881 during launching of combat columns. On 14 December 1881, 50 Legionnaires mounted on mules brought back the first victories.

In 1913, the 3rd Mounted Company of the 2nd Foreign Regiment became the Mounted Company of Morocco (French: Compagnie Montée du Maroc), forming a corps. During the war, the corps was in charge of maintaining the security of communication between Fès and Taza (French: Taza). Assigned to the 3rd Foreign Regiment on 15 November 1920, the corps was reassigned to 2^{e} REI on 1 January 1922, and reassumed the original designation.

On 1 October 1923, the Mounted Company of Morocco became the 1st Mounted Company of the 2^{e} REI, following the creation of a second mounted company at the corps of the infantry regiment. Designated as Mounted Company of the 2^{e} REI on 1 October 1930, the company stationed at Ksar-ès-Souk at the end of the pacification of Morocco. From that date, a part of these mounted units would be motorized.

On 1 January 1950, the last Compagnie Montée, of the 4th Foreign Regiment was dissolved at Ksar-es-Souk.

== Organizational Details ==
Starting 1884, the organization of the Mounted Companies was fixed at 215 men, 3 horses and 120 mules.

The officers were on horse, the Adjutants had each a mule. For other soldiers, there was one mule for every 2 legionairres.

One sits on the mule and the other marches. Every couple of hours, at the command of "change, mount" (French: changez, Montez), the legionnaires would change places. The more senior legionnaire of the two is responsible for the mule ("titled") and the other is the "doubler".

A mounted company progressed at 6 kilometers per hour, but in case of necessity, the mule can sustain a rapid pace and the man on foot can follow in a fast tempo cadence. The normal rhythm was 10 to 15 hours of marching per day, covering 40 to more than 70 km in one day, which created a considerable advantage in the desert.

The legionnaires assigned to these units were the selected tier one (French: sont triés sur le volet) and only the most robust volunteers would hope to serve the "Mounting".

== Combat ==
- Battle of Taghit
- Battle of El-Moungar

Throughout the course of World War I, the mounted companies, which remained in Morocco, were essentially formed of German soldiers.

Those of the 2nd Foreign Infantry Regiment were seen compensated with the Croix de guerre 1914–1918 with four citations at the orders of the Army and the fourragère with colors of the Médaille militaire.

== See also ==
- Saharan Companies of the French Foreign Legion

== Sources ==
- Képi blanc publication n°288, April 1971
- History of the Mounted Companies (Compagnies montées de la Légion étrangère)
