= Armoured Train of the Foreign Legion =

Armoured Train of the Foreign Legion Train blindé de la Légion étrangère
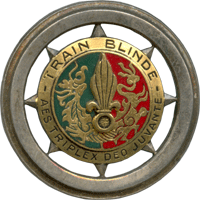
- Active: 1948–1954
- Country: France
- Branch: (France) French Army
- Size: 100
- 7 Flames Grenade & Golden Eastern Dragon & Rail: Train Blindé (fr); Armoured Train; Aes Triplex Deo Juvante (La); Triple airain, Dieu aidant (fr); Triple Alloy, God Aiding
- Engagements: First Indochina War

The Armoured Train of the Foreign Legion (French: Train blindé de la Légion étrangère) was an Armoured train (French: trains blindés) detachment of the Foreign Legion formed in Tonkin. In 1948, the 2nd Foreign Regiment 2^{e} RE, formed one, then two armoured trains to protect convoys from attack by the Vietminh, protect the Transindochinois Line (French: Line du Transindochinois) and support the Army along the rail line. During this military campaign, the Legion formed several armoured trains, which were mounted by the 1st Foreign Cavalry Regiment 1^{er} REC and other Legion units.

== The armoured legion train ==
The protection and escort of supply trains (French: l'escorte des trains de ravitaillement) subjected to ambushes, required the creation of armoured trains.

The armoured Legion train of Nha-Trang (La Rafale) was armed by a regimental company of the 2nd Foreign Regiment 2^{e} RE as of 1948. The train was composed of armoured wagons, protected by imbedded metallic plates. The rooftops of the wagons were mounted by mobile turrets armed with heavy machine guns. The walls were reinforced by bricks and cement; with loopholes (French: meurtrières) allowing the men to repel enemy attacks. Two wagons were combat engineer specialized oriented, with no armour, they were in charge of transporting all the necessary material (including train rails) to parry a sabotage and/or reconstruct the railway when needed.

The armoured train of the Legion assured the protection of all the railway networks in South-Annam, the protection of civilian and military convoys as well the transport of operational units. In July 1954, La Rafale was assigned to the Vietnamese Army.

== Convoy composition ==
- 2 Locomotives;
- 1 Command wagon;
- 8 Combat wagons;
- 1 Armoured infirmary wagon;
- 2 combat engineer Wagons, one at the front and one at the end of the Wagon convoy, for quick fixes when needed;
- 2 Pilot Wagons, at the head of the Wagon convoy, charged with detonating eventual mines.

The autonomy of the Armoured Legion Train was 72 hours and the armament (8 twinned machine guns, one mounted 40 mm cannon, one mounted 20 mm cannon, grenade launchers, and two 60 and 81 mm mortars) allowed this rail fortress to sustain a siege when needed. The crew was constituted of a hundred men.

The Armoured Legion Train accordingly resisted all ambushes, halted all sabotages and was the enduring Rolling Symbol during the chartered course duration of French Indochina.

=== Train insignia ===
Silver circled steel bandage railway; at the center on a green and red background is detached an Eastern Dragon and a golden grenade with 7 flames, encircled by a golden border with inscription: TRAIN BLINDE - AES TRIPLEX DEO JUVANTE, in both French and Latin. The steel railway indicated the vocation of the unit; the grenade with 7 flames and green and red colors are the symbols of the Legion; the insignia : "Triple Alloy, God is helping", actually means "Showing Great Courage, God is helping", is referring to the armouring of the train. The insignia was created in 1948.

== See also ==
- Major (France)
- Jacques Servranckx
- Tonkin (French protectorate)
- French Foreign Legion Music Band (MLE)
- 5th Heavy Weight Transport Company
- Passage Company of the Foreign Legion (CPLE)
- Disciplinary Company of the Foreign Regiments in the Far East
- 5th Foreign Infantry Regiment
- Saharan Companies of the French Foreign Legion
