= Antoine Lecerf =

Antoine Lecerf
- Born: 1950; France
- Died: 22 April 2011 (aged 60–61)
- Military career
- Allegiance: France
- Branch: French Army; French Foreign Legion
- Service years: 1972 – 2010
- Rank: Général de corps d'armée
- Commands: 2nd Foreign Infantry Regiment; 2^{e} REI; Commandement des Forces Terrestres; CFT
- Conflicts: Lebanese Civil War; Opération Épervier; Gulf War; Opération Licorne

Antoine Lecerf (1950 – 22 April 2011) was a French général de corps d’armée.

== Military career ==
In September 1972, Antoine was admitted at École spéciale militaire de Saint-Cyr. He underwent two years and was part of the de Linares promotion. Following his commission, he chose the infantry and pursued formation at the École de l'infanterie (French: école de l'infanterie) at Montpellier. In September 1975, he joined the 2nd Foreign Regiment 2^{e} RE at Corte-Bonifacio as a section platoon chief (French: chef de section), then was assigned to the 3rd Foreign Infantry Regiment 3^{e} REI at Kourou (Guyana).

In August 1978, the joined the 2nd Foreign Regiment 2^{e} RE at Corte-Bonifacio, where he was assigned as the assistant (French: adjoint) to the commandant of the unit, he commanded the 6th company and participated to the United Nations Interim Force in Lebanon (French: force intérimaire des Nations unies au Liban) in Beirut, from May to June 1983. Upon returning from Lebanon, he was assigned at Lille to occupy the functions of aide de camp of the general commandant of the 2nd Military Region, commandant of the 3rd Army Corps (French: 3^{e} Corps d’Armée).

In June 1985, he was designated as a candidate at the Command and General Staff College at Fort Leavenworth (United States - U.S.) before being admitted in June 1987 at the Superior War School (French: l’école supérieure de guerre) in Paris in quality as a candidate of the 101st promotion.

In June 1989, he rejoined, as an instructor chief operations bureau, the 2nd Foreign Infantry Regiment at Nimes and participated from October 1989 to February 1990 to the Land detachment "Épervier (French: Épervier) in Tchad, the operation "Requin" in Gabon from May to June 1990 before assuming the deputy command functions of the regiment.

He participated, from September 1990 to March 1991 to Opération Daguet in Saudi Arabia then was assigned to the cabinet of the minister of defense at Paris in quality of a chief of the Land cell. In July 1994, he commanded the 2nd Foreign Infantry Regiment. He commanded from August to September the detachment of French elements of operational assistance in Central African Republic and was detached from June to November 1995 to Bosnia-Herzegovina (French: Bosnie-Herzégovine) within the cadre of the rapid reaction force as commander of the French Inter-arm Battalion of the Multinational Brigade (French: Bataillon Interarmes Français de la Brigade Multinationale). From May to July 1996, he commanded again the detachment of French elements of operational assistance in Central African Republic and participated to operation "Alamandin II". In July, he joined inter-arm defense college at Paris as a professor.

He was auditor (French: auditeur) of the 50th session of the Institute of High Studies and National Defense (French: l’institut des hautes études de défense nationale) in 1997 then was a chargé mission at inter-arm general staff headquarters for operational planning in July 1998. Two years later, he was assigned to the Commandement des Forces Terrestres as plans division chief. In August 2002, he assumed the functions of division chief "emploi" at the general staff headquarters of the Armies at Paris.

In August 2004, he was designated as commandant of general staff headquarters of Force n° 4 (French: état-major de force n° 4). He then commanded, French forces engaged in Opération Licorne (French: opération Licorne) in Ivory Coast from 15 June 2006 until 9 July 2007. On 15 September 2007 he received the commandment of Land Action Force which became the Commandement des Forces Terrestres in June 2008.

He left the head of the Commandement des Forces Terrestres on 16 July 2010 and bid farewell to the arms.

He died on 22 April 2011.

== Recognitions and Honors ==

- Grand Officer of the Legion d'honneur (Commander by decree 01/07/2006 - Officer on 14/07/2000 - Knight 30/07/1992)
- Commander of the National Order of Merit, decree of 06/11/2003 (Officer 17/12/1996, Knight 22/12/1988)
- Croix de guerre des théâtres d'opérations extérieures (with vermeil star)
- Cross for Military Valour (with 2 bronze stars)
- Médaille de la Gendarmerie nationale
- Croix du Combattant
- Médaille d'Outre-Mer
- Médaille de la Défense nationale (échelon bronze)
- Médaille commémorative française
- Medal of the UN for ex-Yugoslavia
- Kuwait Liberation Medal (Saudi Arabia)
- Kuwait Liberation Medal (Kuwait)

== See also ==
- 31st Brigade (France)
