= 2nd Foreign Infantry Regiment (France) =

- 2^{e} régiment étranger d'infanterie
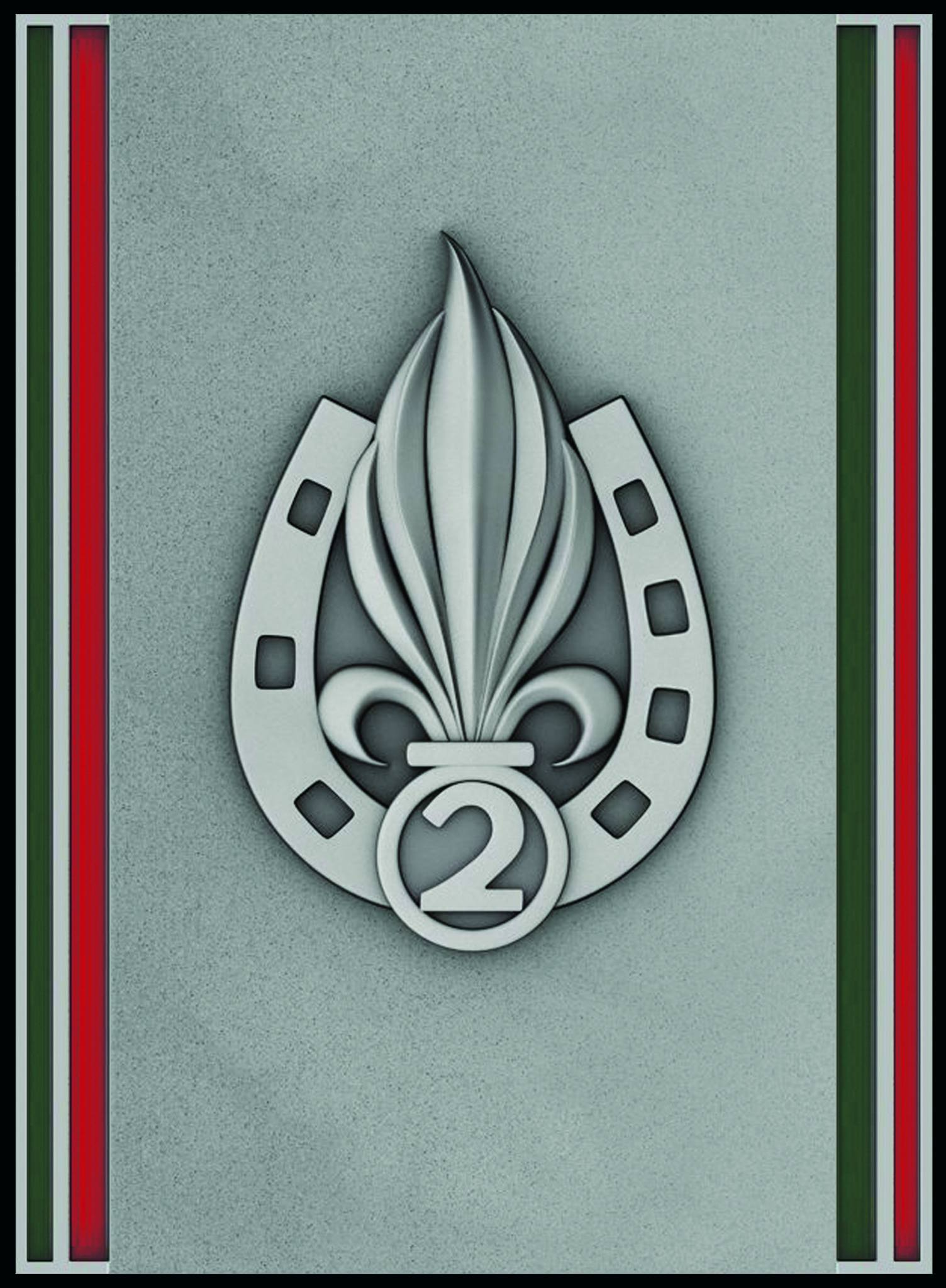
- Active: 3 Apr 1841 – 1 Apr 1943; 1 Aug 1945 – 1 Jan 1968; 1 Sept 1972 – present
- Country: France
- Branch: French Army
- Type: Infantry
- Role: Counter-insurgency; Desert warfare Jungle warfare Raiding; Reconnaissance; Urban warfare
- Size: ~1,300 men
- Part of: 31^{e} Brigade (1981–1984) 6th Light Armoured Division (1990–1991); 6th Light Armored Brigade (1999–present) 3rd Division
- Garrison/HQ: Nîmes, France
- Nickname: 2^{e} Étranger (2nd Foreign)
- Motto: Être prêt ("Be ready")
- Colors: Green and Red
- March: Anne-Marie du "2"
- Mascot: Tapanar (mule)
- Anniversaries: Camerone Day (April 30); El-Moungar day (September 2)
- Engagements: Pacification of Algeria; Crimean War; Second Italian War of Independence; French intervention in Mexico; Franco-Prussian War; Sino-French War; Second Franco-Dahomean War; Second Madagascar expedition; Maroc 1907–1913–1921–1934; World War I; Levant Campaign; Rif War; World War II; First Indochina War; Algerian War; Chadian–Libyan conflict; Lebanon 1982–1984; Gulf War; Yugoslavia Wars; Rwandan Civil War; War in Afghanistan; First Ivorian Civil War; Second Ivorian Civil War; Northern Mali conflict; Central African Republic conflict (2012–present)

Commanders
- Current commander: Colonel Stève Carleton
- Notable commanders: de MacMahon de Canrobert de Chabrières; Carbuccia

Insignia
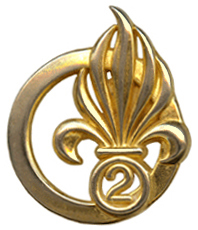
- Beret insignia
- Abbreviation: 2^{ème} REI

The 2nd Foreign Infantry Regiment (French: 2^{e} Régiment Étranger d'Infanterie, 2^{e} REI) is an infantry regiment of the Foreign Legion in the French Army. The regiment is one of two mechanized infantry regiments of the 6th Light Armoured Brigade.

Since the regiment's arrival from Bonifacio in 1983, it has been stationed at Quartier Colonel de Chabrières; named in honor of Colonel de Chabrières who was shot in the chest while leading a charge of the regiment. Quartier Colonel Chabrières is situated in Nimes, a historical Roman city, in the south of France.

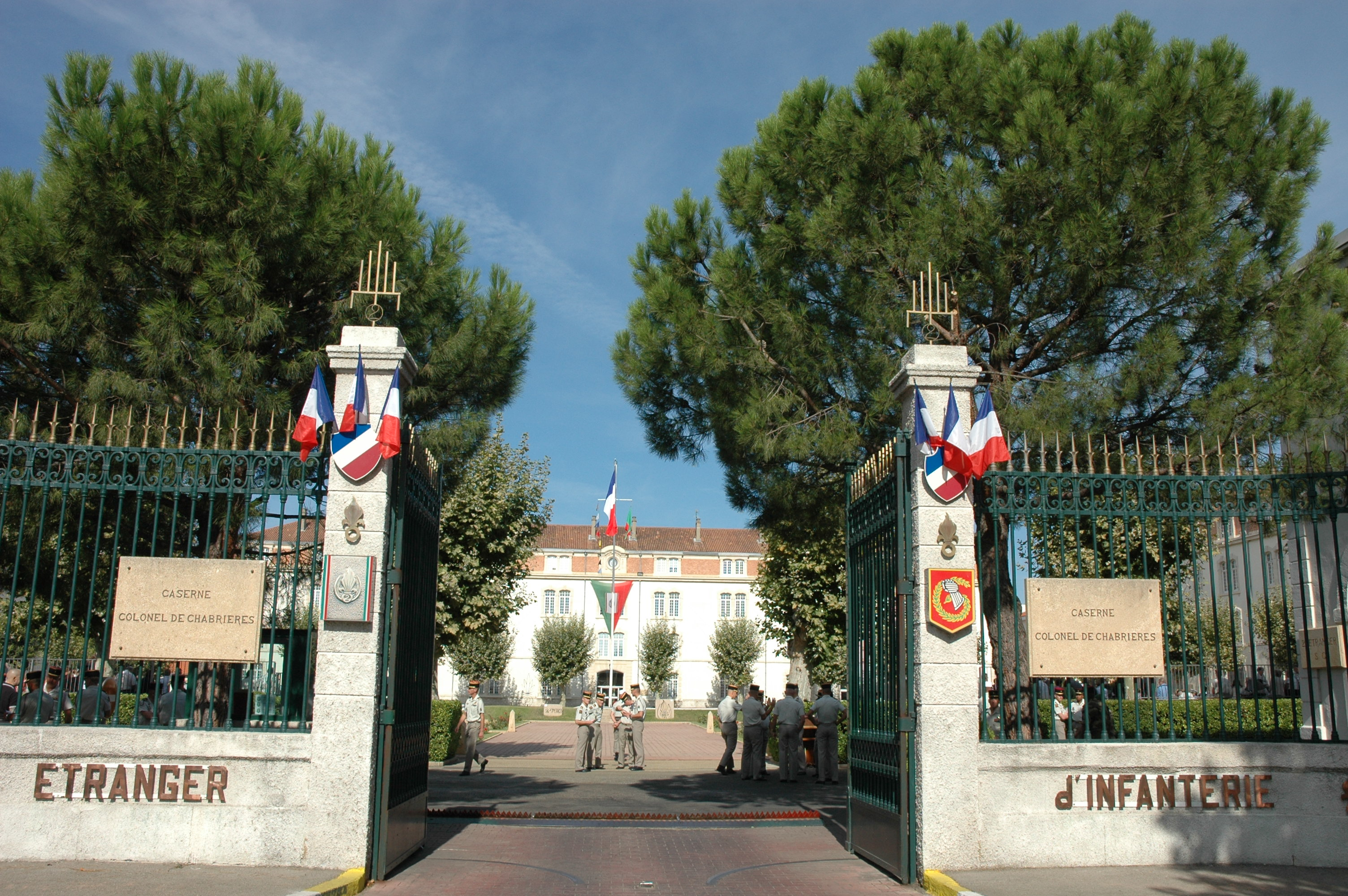
Barracks in Nîmes, France.

An armored infantry regiment, equipment includes more than 135 Véhicule de l'Avant Blindé (VAB) and Véhicule Blindé Léger (VBL), to provide armoured protection of personnel during combat. The regiment also has the Véhicule blindé de combat d'infanterie (VBCI). The Regiment has responsibility for field testing new equipment for the French Army as a whole.

The regiment benefits from a long tradition of conflicts and interventions. Recent engagements, from the Balkans to Afghanistan while passing by the Ivory Coast and the Central African Republic added additional experiences for the regiment.

== History ==
Under the first restoration, the Bourbons only retained the Swiss, in souvenir to their loyal service rendered to France during four centuries, and with them also, four foreign regiments out of which one colonial, formed of Spanish and Portuguese. The eight reorganized foreign regiments by Napoleon at the hundred days formed in 1815 the Royal Foreign Legion (French: « Légion Royale Etrangère »), which became the Hohenlohe Legion (French: « La Légion de Hohenlohe »), then in 1821 the Hohenlohe Regiment. Licensed in 1830, the latter contributed to form the Twenty First Light, then the French Foreign Legion (French: La Légion Étrangère). The Swiss regiments of the restoration disappeared in 1830, nevertheless, the Swiss joined the French Army again from 1855 to 1859 under the successive denomination of 2nd Foreign Legion (French: « La Deuxième Légion Etrangère ») and 1st Foreign Regiment (French: 1^{er} Régiment Etranger).

=== Foreign Legion since 1831 ===
On March 10, 1831; the Foreign Legion was created.

On April 1, 1841, the Legion was split in two formations. The 2nd Regiment was organized at Bône, on April 13, 1841, provisionary at two battalions of the 1st Foreign Regiment; the 4th battalion was sent to Algiers and the 5th battalion was garrisoned at Bône. The regiment consisted, just like the other Line infantry regiments of the époque, a formation of 3,000 men. The 3rd battalion was formed in the following month of May.

The regiment was quartered at Constantine in Algeria, with garrisons held at Bône, Bougie, and Djidjelli. Colonel Senilhes was the first regimental commander. The first regimental flag was received in 1848 by colonel Jean-Luc Carbuccia.

In 1854, Napoleon III decided to create a 2nd Legion, composed uniquely of Swiss. However, with a reduced form of recruitment, the two units, which were engaged in Crimea, were dismissed at the end of the conflict and regrouped to form the 2nd Foreign Regiment, which re-departed to Algeria in 1856.

On January 1, 1862, the two foreign regiments merged under the title of the Foreign Regiment.

As part of a reorganisation of the Armee d'Afrique, the regiment was retitled the Foreign Legion (« Légion étrangère ») on March 13, 1875. It numbered 3018 men. On January 1, 1885, the 2nd Foreign Regiment was reformed. The 1st and 2nd battalion remained in Algeria. The 3rd battalion was assigned to Tonkin and the 4th battalion was sent to Formosa in 1884, then returned to Tonkin.

=== 2nd Regiment of the 1st Foreign Legion in 1855 ===
- On April 3, 1841; the 2nd Regiment of the Foreign Legion (2^{ème} R.L.E) was created at Bône and commanded by Colonel Sinelhes, constituted of 2240 legionnaires and organized in 3 battalions stationed in Bone, Bougie and Djidjelli, respectively, starting from 1842.
- From 1841 to 1857: the 2nd Regiment (2^{ème} R.L.E) participated at the conquest and campaigns of Algeria.
- From 1854 to 1855: the 2nd Regiment (2^{ème} R.L.E) took part in the Crimean War in the Battle of Alma and the Siege of Sevastopol.
- On January 17, 1855: the 2nd Regiment (2^{ème} R.L.E) became the 2nd Regiment of the 1st Foreign Legion (2^{ème}R.1^{ère}L.E)

=== 2nd Foreign Regiment in 1856 ===
- In 1856, the 2nd Regiment became the 2nd Foreign Regiment (2^{ème}R.E).
- In 1859, the 2nd Foreign Regiment took part in the Second Italian War of Independence.
- On June 4, 1859; Colonel de Chabrière, the regimental commander, was killed in action leading the charge during the Battle of Magenta.

=== Foreign Regiment of the 1st Foreign Regiment in 1862 ===
- In 1862, the 2nd Foreign Regiment became the Foreign Regiment (R.E).
- From 1863 to 1867: the Foreign Regiment took part in the French intervention in Mexico.
- On April 30, 1863; the Foreign Regiment (R.E) took part in the legendary Battle of Camarón where legion officers, Captain Jean Danjou, Sous-Lieutenant Jean Vilain, Sous-Lieutenant Clément Maudet led 62 legionnaires against 800 Mexican cavalry and 2,200 Mexican infantry. When only six of the French-led soldiers remained, and were out of ammunition, a bayonet assault was launched in which three of the legionnaires were killed.

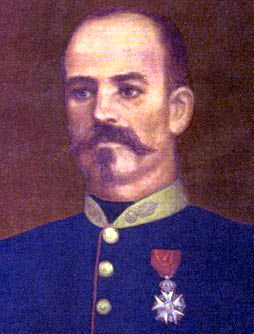
Captain Jean Danjou (Battle of Camarón)

- From 1864 to 1907: the Foreign Regiment took part in the South-Oranese Campaign.
- From 1870 to 1871: the Foreign Regiment took part in the Franco-Prussian War. Three battalions of the regiment (two battalions from Algeria and one formed in France) participated in the Battles of Orleans, the Battle of Coulmiers and the Battle of Saint Suzanne. Immediately following the war, the Foreign Regiment was amongst those troops used to suppress the rising of the Paris Commune (May 1871).

=== Foreign Legion of the 1st Foreign Regiment in 1875 ===
- On April 10, 1875; the 2nd Foreign Regiment became the Foreign Legion (L.E).
- In 1883, the Foreign Legion took part in the Far East in the Sino-French War, notably during the Capture of Sontay, the Bắc Ninh Campaign, the Siege of Tuyên Quang and the disembarking of Formosa.
- On January 1, 1885; the Foreign Legion became the 2nd Foreign Regiment.

=== Sudan Campaign and Dahomey Expedition ===
- From 1892 to 1894, the 2nd Foreign Regiment (2^{ème} R.E) took part in the Sudan Campaign and the Second Franco-Dahomean War.
- In 1903, the 2nd Foreign Regiment took part in the Battle of El-Moungar.
- From 1895 to 1905: the 2nd Foreign Regiment took part in the Campaigns of Madagascar.
- From 1907 to 1918: the 2nd Foreign Regiment took part in the French conquest of Morocco; during which combat units of the regiment received 7 citations at the orders of the armed forces.

On August 29, 1907 a regiment de marche was created from the 2nd Foreign Regiment (2 RE) in Morocco.

==== Pacification of Algeria ====
From 1841 to 1907 legionnaires from the 2nd Regiment were deployed in Algeria. In the early twentieth century, France faced numerous incidents, attacks and looting by uncontrolled armed groups, in the newly occupied areas in the south of Oran (Algeria). Under the command of General Lyautey, the French Army's mission was to protect these areas newly seized in the west of Algeria, near the poorly defined Moroccan boundaries.

On 17 August 1903, the first battle of the South-Oranese campaign took place in Taghit, where Foreign legionnaires were assailed by a contingent of more than 1,000 well-equipped Berbers. For 3 days, the legionnaires repelled repeated attacks of an enemy more than 10 times higher in number, and inflicted huge losses on the attackers, forcing them finally into a hasty retreat.

A few months after the Battle of Taghit, 148 legionnaires of the 22nd mounted company, from the 2ème REI, commanded by Captain Vauchez and Lieutenant Selchauhansen, 20 spahis and two Mokhaznis were escorting a supply convoy, when they were ambushed at 9:30 am on 2 September by 3,000 Moroccans marauders. The half-company had halted to eat, no sentries had been posted and only a few cavalry pickets had been placed.

The first volleys wounded or killed half of the detachment. Both officers and most of the non-commissioned officers were killed in the first stage of the fight. At 10:30 am, Quartermaster Sergeant (sergent-fourrier) Tisserand, who commanded the survivors, sent two spahi cavalrymen to Taghit for reinforcements. They immediately left.

About forty survivors of the French force gathered on a nearby hill and under a scorching sun, on hot sand and without water, fought off the enemy for more than eight hours. Near the end of the battle, Tisserand, wounded, gave over command to Corporal Detz; the highest-ranked man still able. At 5 pm, they were relieved by Captain de Sulbielle, who rode from Taghit with his Spahis. At the sight of the approaching French cavalry, the Moroccans retreated in small groups.

In November 1908; the Marching Regiment of the 2nd Foreign Regiment (R.M.2^{ème}R.E) was dissolved .

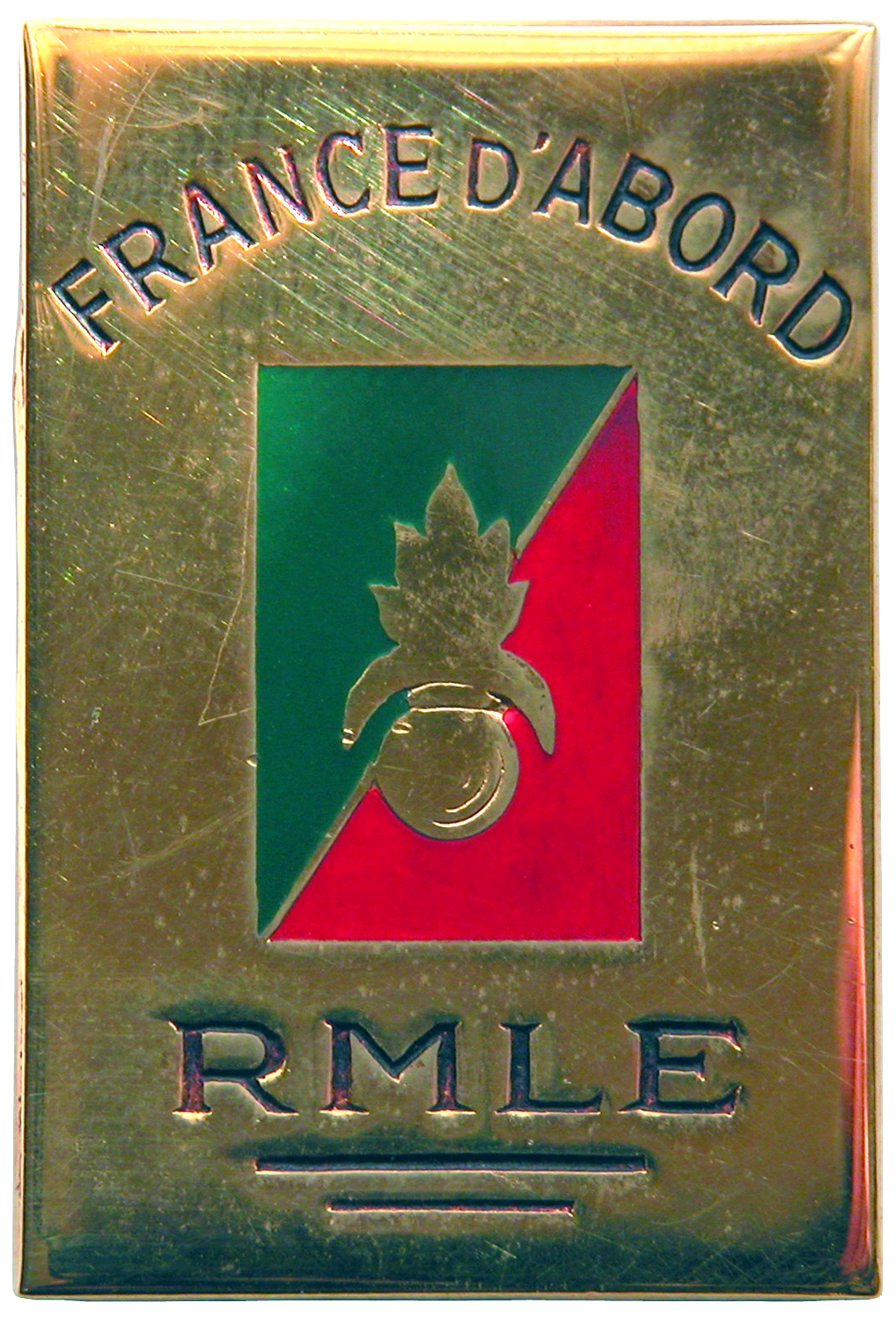
Marching Regiment of the Foreign Legion

On August 7, 1914, following the outbreak of World War I; the 1st Marching Regiment of the 2nd Foreign Regiment (1er R.M.2^{ème}R.E) remained in Morocco with the formed combat company and the 2nd Marching Regiment of the 2nd Foreign Regiment (2^{ème}R.M.2^{ème}R.E) took arms at the fronts in mainland France; receiving 5 citations at the orders of the armed forces. In September 1915, the 2nd Marching Regiment of the 2nd Foreign Regiment was dissolved and the components were merged with the 2nd Marching Regiment of the 1st Foreign Regiment to form the Marching Regiment of the Foreign Legion (R.M.L.E) created November 11, 1915. During the interwar period, combat in Morocco persevered from 1919 to 1934 and the regiment received 7 citations at the orders of the armed forces.

=== 2nd Foreign Infantry Regiment in 1922 ===
- In 1922, the 2nd Foreign Regiment (2^{ème}R.E) became the 2nd Foreign Infantry Regiment (2^{ème}R.E.I).
- On April 1, 1943, during World War II, the 2nd Foreign Infantry Regiment was dissolved and its components were transferred to the Marching Regiment of the Foreign Legion, (R.M.L.E) from 1943 to 1945.

=== Far East Marching Regiment of the Foreign Legion in 1945 ===
- On August 1, 1945; the Far East Marching Regiment of the Foreign Legion (or R.M.L.E/E.O. for Régiment de marche de la Légion Etrangère d'Extrême-Orient) was formed.

=== 2nd Foreign Infantry Regiment in 1946 ===
- On January 1, 1946; the regiment was renamed the 2nd Foreign Infantry Regiment (2^{ème}R.E.I).
- From 1946 to 1955: the 2nd Foreign Infantry Regiment took part in the First Indochina War and receives 9 citations at the orders of the armed forces.

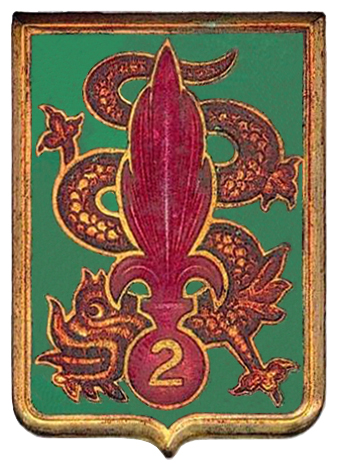
2nd Foreign Infantry Regiment (2^{ème} REI) during the Dien Bien Phu order of battle

- From 1955 to 1956: the 2nd Foreign Infantry Regiment rejoined Tunisia, then Morocco.
- From 1956 to 1962: the 2nd Foreign Infantry Regiment participated in combat operations during the Algerian War.
- From 1962 to 1967: the 2nd Foreign Infantry Regiment was placed at the disposition of central command of military sites in the Sahara.
- On January 1, 1968; the 2nd Foreign Infantry Regiment was dissolved.

=== 2nd Foreign Regiment in 1972 ===
On September 1, 1972; the recreation of the 2nd Foreign Regiment took place in Corsica. While in Corsica the regiment was garrisoned in Corte (basic training unit) and Bonifacio.

=== 2nd Foreign Infantry Regiment in 1980 ===
- On July 1, 1980; the 2nd Foreign Regiment became the 2nd Foreign Infantry Regiment.
- From 1982 to 1984: the 2nd Foreign Infantry Regiment filled the ranks of the Multinational Force in Lebanon. During the deployment of the regiment to Lebanon in 1983; the men took part in several training and combat peacekeeping missions while also finding out that they will not be seeing Corsica again and will return to Nîmes, the new garrison of the 2nd Foreign Infantry Regiment as of November 11, 1983, while the 2nd Foreign Parachute Regiment (2e REP), moved to Calvi.
- In 1986, elements of the 2nd Foreign Infantry Regiment were deployed to Chad as part of Operation Sparrowhawk (Operation Épervier).
- The regiment has also participated in several recent conflicts, most notably in the Gulf War (1991), in Bosnia, Chad and other parts of Africa.
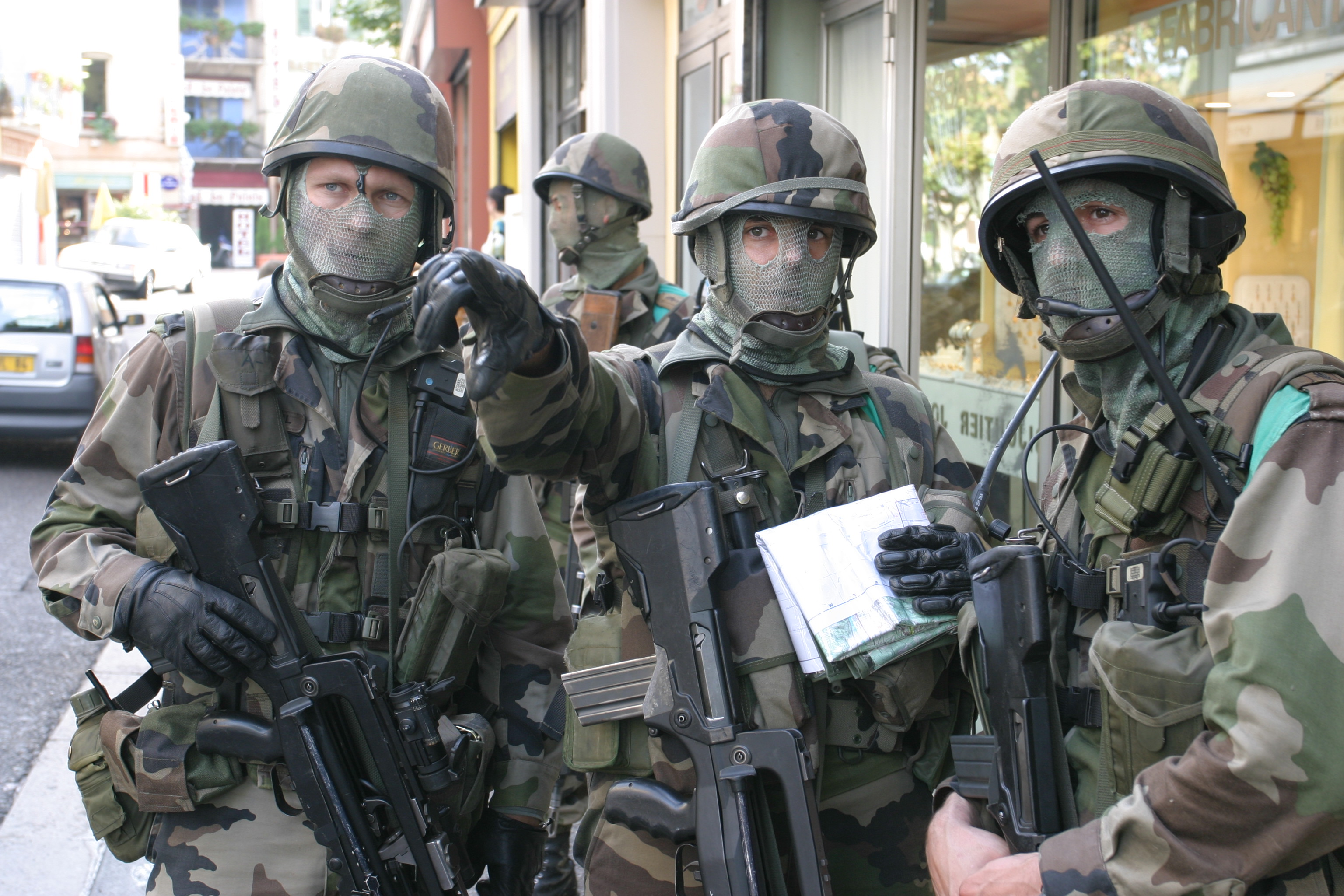
- Soldiers from the 2nd Foreign Infantry Regiment training in urban combat in France in 2004.
  Since 2001, the regiment took part in the global war on terror. In 2006, the 2nd Foreign Infantry Regiment deployed as part of the French contingent of the ISAF.

== Organization ==
The regiment is composed of around 1,337 men organized into 10 companies, making it one of the largest infantry regiments in the French Army.

- Compagnie de Commandement et de Logistique (CCL) – Command and Logistics Company
- Compagnie d'Administration et de Soutien (CAS) – Administrative and Support Company
- 1^{re} Compagnie de Combat (1^{re} Cie) – 1st Combat Company (4 combat sections)
- 2^{ème} Compagnie de Combat (2^{e} Cie) – 2nd Combat Company (4 combat sections)
- 3^{ème} Compagnie de Combat (3^{e} Cie) – 3rd Combat Company (4 combat sections)
- 4^{ème} Compagnie de Combat (4^{e} Cie) – 4th Combat Company (4 combat sections)
- 5^{ème} Compagnie de Combat (5^{e} Cie) – 5th Combat Company (4 combat sections)
- Compagnie Antichar (CAC) – Anti-Tank Company (4 sections)
- Compagnie d'Eclairage et d'Appui (CEA) – Reconnaissance and Support Company (3 sections)
  - Section de reconnaissance régimentaire (SRR) – Regimental Recce Platoon (VBL)
  - Section antichars (SAC) – Anti-Tank Platoon (Milan)
  - Section de tireurs d'élite (STE) – Sniper Platoon (PGM 12.7mm)
- 8^{ème} Compagnie de reserve (8^{e} Cie) – 8th Reserve Company

== Traditions ==
=== Insignias ===
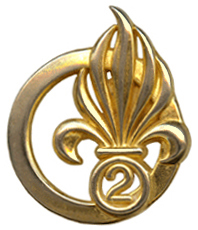
Beret insignia of the 2nd Foreign Infantry Regiment, 2^{ème} REI

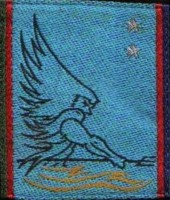
The Foreign Legion Groupment, G.L.E in the 31^{ème} Brigade featuring Poseidon

=== Regimental Colors ===
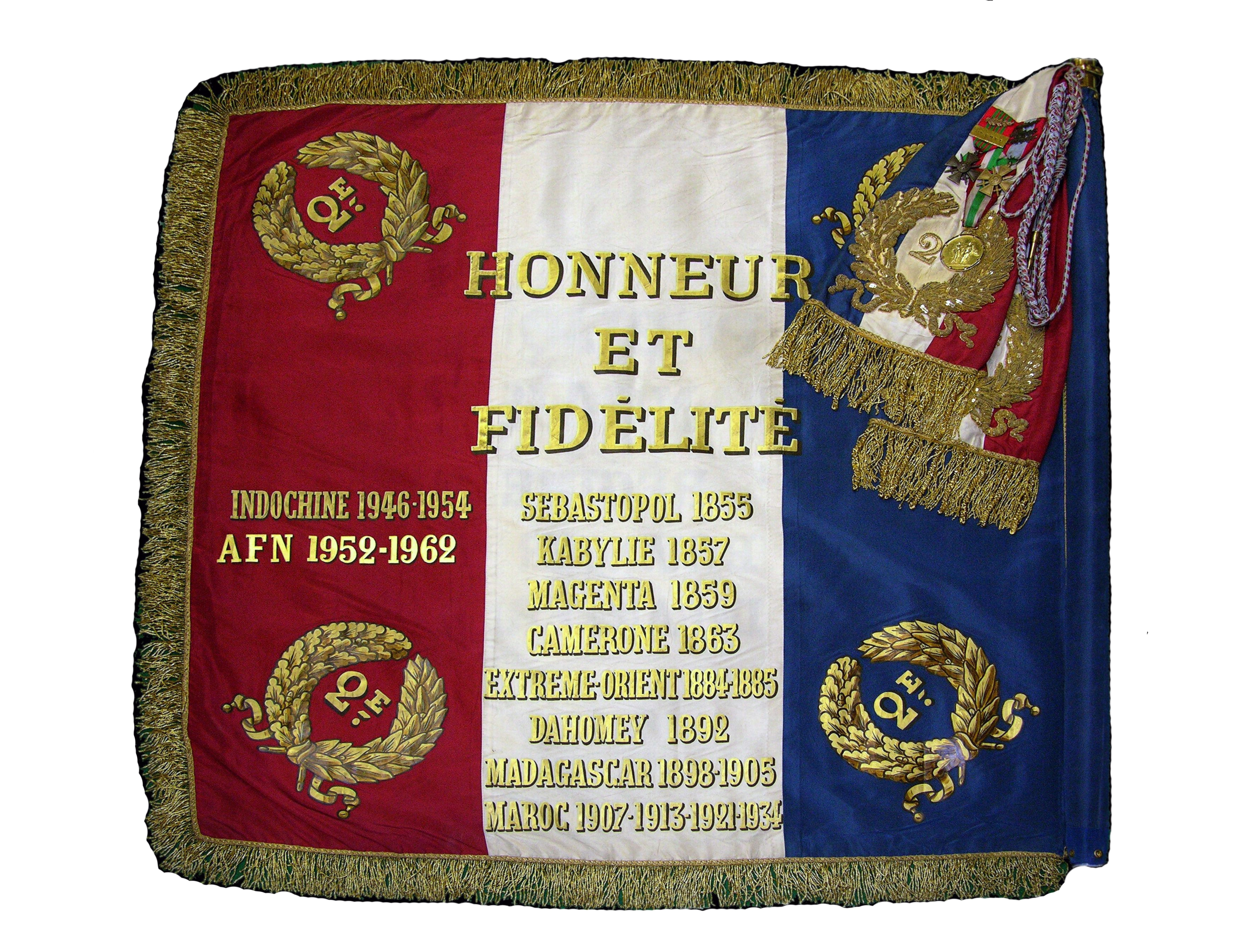
Regimental Colors of the 2nd REI with Honneur et Fidélité.

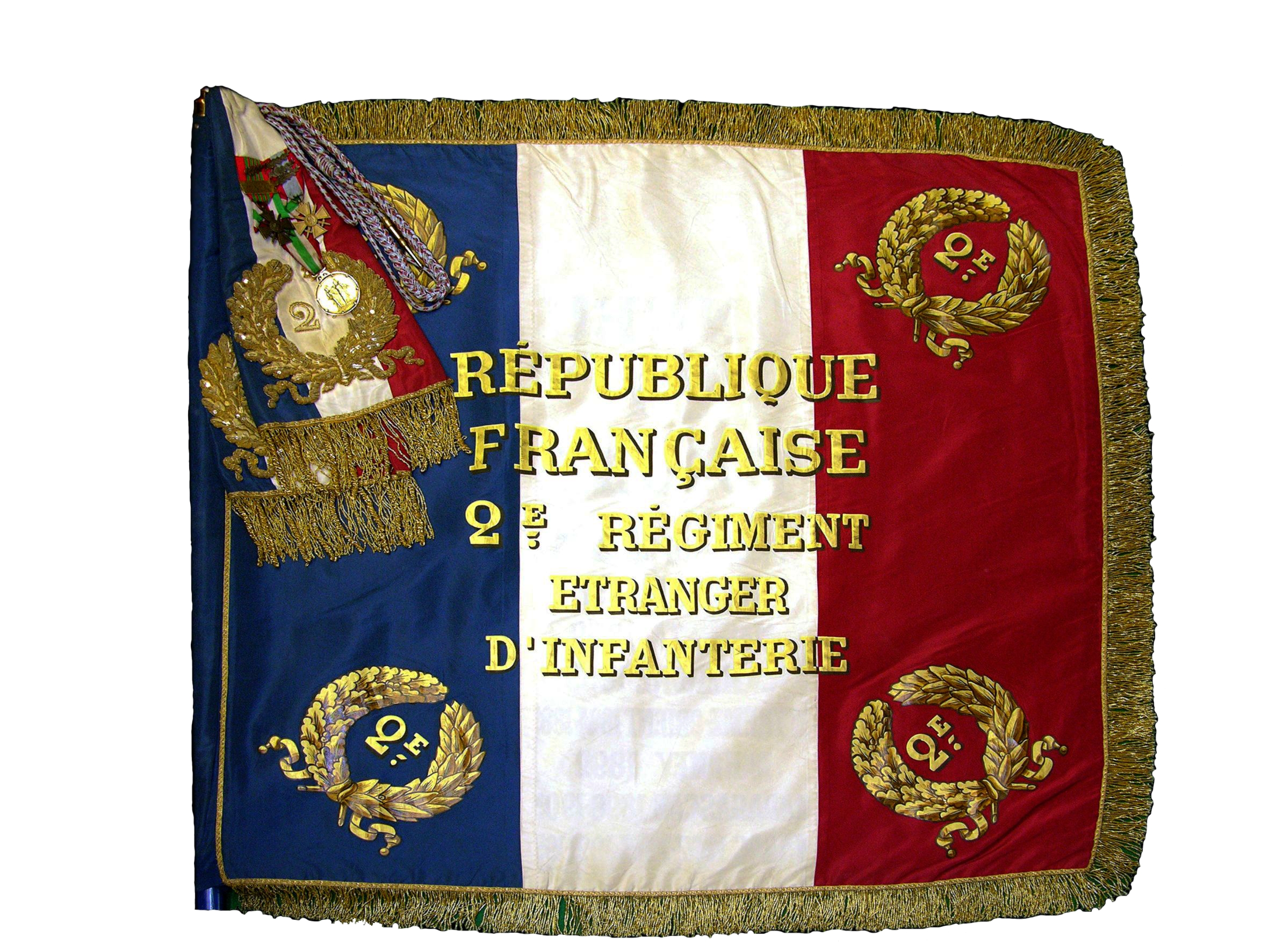
Recto of Regimental Colors

=== Regimental Song ===
Chant de Marche: Anne-Marie du 2ème REI in the German language featuring:

-I-
Anne-Marie, wo geht die Reise in,
Anne-Marie, wo geht die Reise in,
Sie geht in's Städtelein
Wo die Soldaten sein.
Ein, zwei, drei
Junge, junge, junge Anne-Marie

-II-
Anne-Marie, heute wollen wir lustig sein,
Anne-Marie, heute wollen wir lustig sein,
Wir wollen tanzen gehen
Und uns im Kreise drehen.
Ein, zwei, drei
Junge, junge, junge Anne-Marie.

=== Decorations ===
- Croix de guerre des Théatres d'Opérations Extérieures with 3 palms (First Indochina War 1945 to 1954 and Gulf War 1990 to 1991).
- Cross for Military Valour with palm Afghanistan.
- Gold Medal of the City of Milan in recognition for the victors in the battles Magenta and Solférino.

The standard and regimental colors of the 2nd Foreign Infantry Regiment is heir to 28 citations at the orders of the armed forces.

Personnels of the regiment are authorized to wear the fourragère with colors of the Croix de guerre des Théâtres d'Opérations Extérieurs.

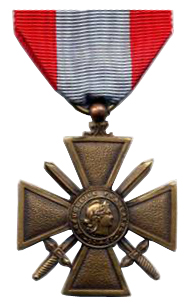
Croix de guerre of TOE

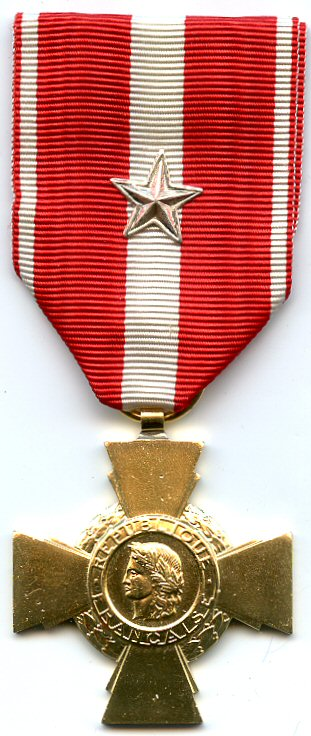
Croix de la Valeur militaire

Gold Medal of the City of Milan

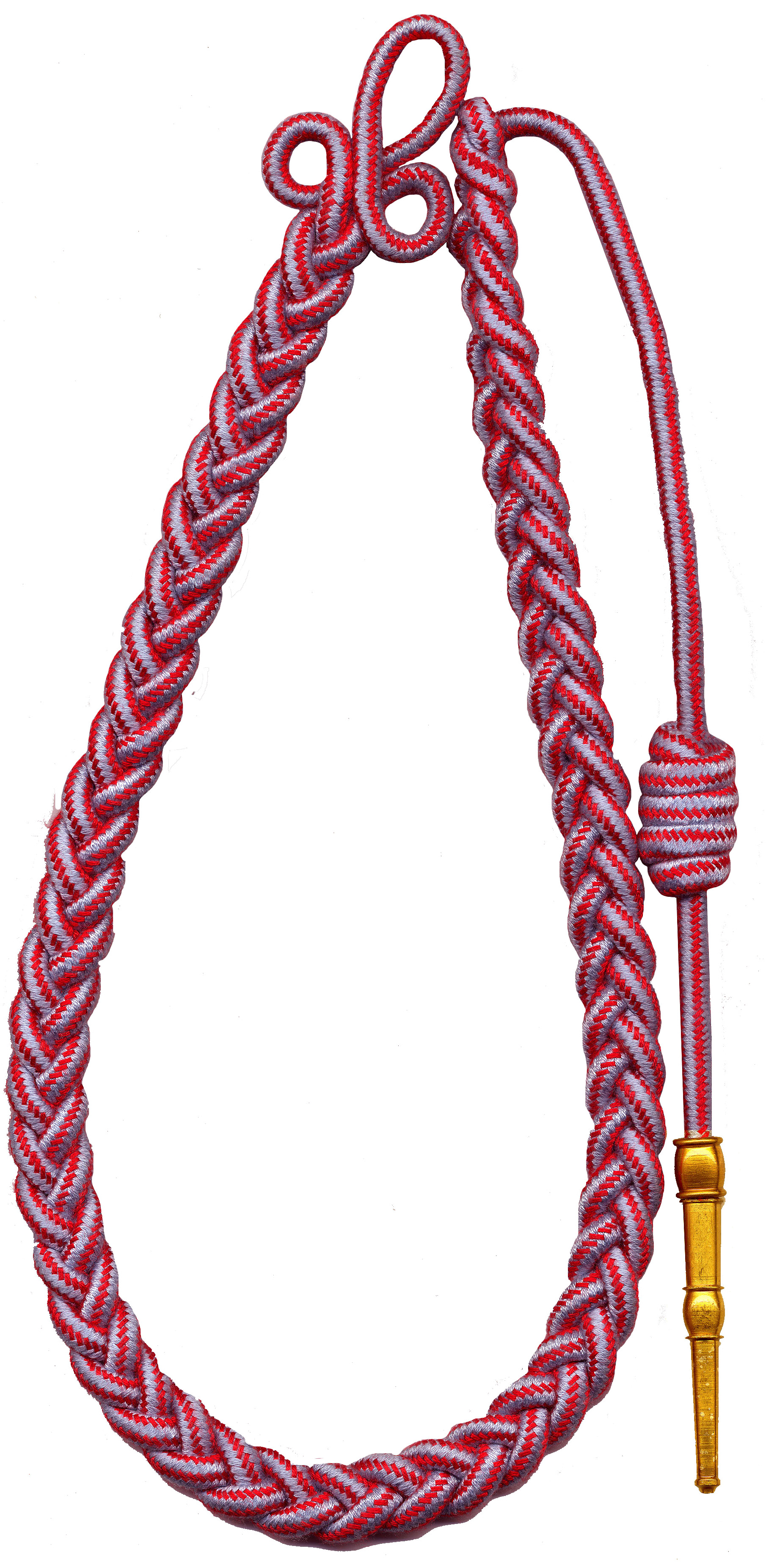
Ruban colors of the Croix de guerre des Théâtres d'opérations extérieures

=== Honours ===
==== Battle Honours ====
- Sevastopol 1855
- Kabilie 1857
- Magenta 1859
- Camerone 1863
- Extreme Orient 1884–1885
- Dahomey 1892
- Madagascar 1898–1905
- Maroc 1907–1913–1921–1934
- Indochine 1946–1954
- AFN 1952–1962
- Koweït 1990–1991

In the 19th century, the colors of the 2nd Foreign Legion Regiment were inscribed with the following battles and campaigns:

- Constantine, Algeria (1837)
- Mostaganem (1839)
- Mouzaïa (1840)
- Coleah (1841)
- Djidjelli (1842)
- Zaatcha (1849)
- Fedj-Menazel (1851)
- Battle of Alma (1854)

=== Regimental Annual Celebration ===
The annual celebration of the 2nd Foreign Infantry Regiment is the second Campaign of Madagascar, which took place on September 2, 1903. The regiment honors that day with a parade commemorating and presenting hommage to the old combatants and anciens.

== Regimental commanders ==
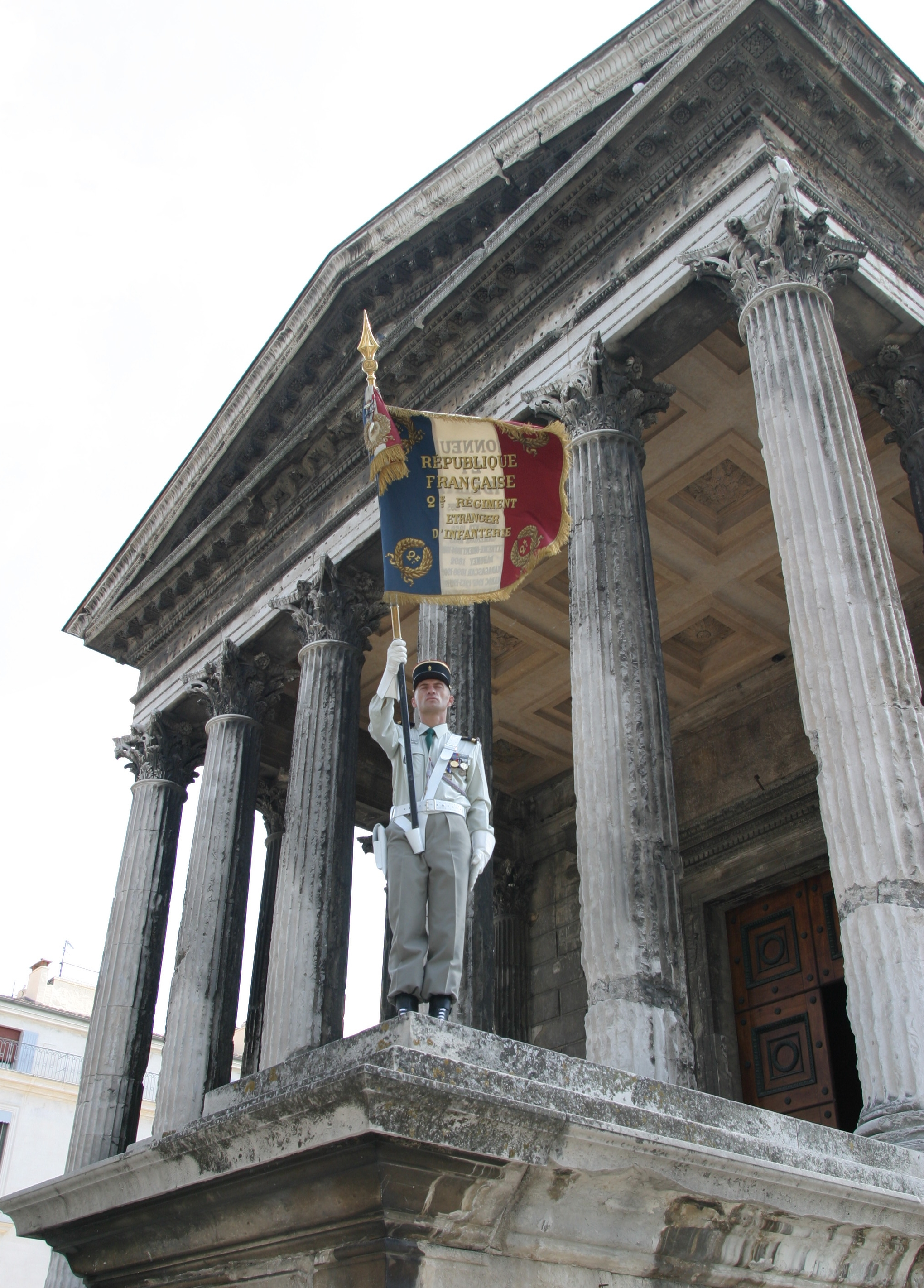
Regimental Colors of the 2^{ème} Étranger on the best-preserved Roman temple, the Maison Carrée

2nd Foreign Legion Regiment Tenure
2^{e} Régiment Etranger de la Légion étrangère(2^{ème}R.E.L.E)
Tenure (1841–1855)

- 1841–1843: de Senilhes
- 1843–1844: Duke, de Mac-Mahon
- 1844–1848: de Senilhes
- 1848–1848: de Canrobert
- 1848–1848: Count, de Noue
- 1848–1851: Carbuccia
- 1851–1851: Cœur
- 1851–1855: de Caprez
- 1855–1855: de Chabrières

2nd Foreign Regiment Tenure
2^{e} Régiment Etrangère(2^{ème} R.E.)
Tenure (1856–1875)

- 1856–1859: de Chabrières
- 1859–1856: Signorino
- 1859–1862: Mathieu Butet
- 1862–1862: Jeanningros
- 1862–1866: Jeanningros
- 1866–1867: Guilhem
- 1867–1870: Deplanque
- 1870–1875: de Mallaret

Foreign Legion Tenure
Légion Etrangère(L.E.)
Tenure (1875–1884)

- 1870–1875: de Mallaret
- 1881–1883: de Négrier
- 1883–1884: Grisot

2nd Foreign Regiment Tenure
2^{e} Régiment étrangère(2^{ème} R.E)
Tenure (1885–1922)

- 1885–1886: Hugot
- 1886–1888: Letellier
- 1888–1889: Vincent
- 1889–1893: Gillet
- 1893–1895: Oudri
- 1895–1896: Gosse Dubois
- 1896–1900: Béranger
- 1900–1902: Bruneau
- 1902–1906: Desorthes
- 1906–1908: Schlumberger
- 1908–1908: Branlière
- 1908–1908: Alix
- 1908–1911: Brulard
- 1911–1914: Passar
- 1914–1915: Bourgeois
- 1915–1915: Plande
- 1915–1915: Arque
- 1915–1916: Deville
- 1916–1917: Donneve
- 1917–1917: Chartier
- 1917–1918: Arrieu
- 1918–1920: Hottenger
- 1920–1922: Martin

1st Marching Regiment of the 2nd Foreign Regiment Tenure
1^{er} Régiment de Marche du 2^{e} Régiment Etranger (1^{er} R.M.2^{ème}R.E)
Tenure (1907–1918)

- 1907–1907: Brulard
- 1908–1909: Szarvas
- 1909–1912: Forey
- 1912–1913: Vandenberg
- 1913–1914: Girodon
- 1915–1916: Crobière
- 1916–1916: Theveney
- 1916–1917: Tisseyre

2nd Marching Regiment of the 2nd Foreign Regiment Tenure
2^{e} Régiment de Marche du 2^{e} Régiment Etranger (2^{ème}R.M.2^{ème}R.E)
Tenure (1914–1915)

- 1914–1914: Passard
- 1914–1915: Lecomte-Denis
- 1915–1915: De Lavenne de Choulot

2nd Foreign Infantry Regiment Tenure
2^{e} Régiment Etranger d'Infanterie(2^{ème}R.E.I)
Tenure (1922–1968)

- 1922–1923: Martin
- 1924–1925: Marty
- 1926–1928: Genmeau
- 1928–1930: Debas
- 1930–1934: Richert
- 1934–1938: Gerard
- 1938–1940: Girard
- 1940–1943: Flan
- 1945–1947: Lorillot
- 1946–1946: Babonneau (deputy command)
- 1947–1948: Courcelle-Labrousse
- 1948–1948: Nicolas
- 1949–1949: de la Sausserie
- 1949–1950: Thevenot
- 1950–1951: de Borde
- 1951–1953: Daigny
- 1953–1956: Jacquot
- 1956–1958: Goujon
- 1958–1959: Thevenon
- 1959–1961: de Seze
- 1961–1963: Romet
- 1963–1965: Le Vert
- 1965–1967: Kopf
- 1967–1968: de Monferrand

2nd Foreign Regiment Tenure
2^{e} Régiment Etrangère(2^{ème}R.E)
Tenure (1972–1980)

- 1972–1974: Servranckx (*****)
- 1974–1976: Gilbert
- 1976–1978: Mougin
- 1978–1980: Liege
- 1980–1980: de Montlebert

2nd Foreign Infantry Regiment Tenure
2^{e} Régiment Etranger d'Infanterie (2^{ème}R.E.I) Tenure (1980–present)

- 1980–1982: de Montlebert (**)
- 1982–1984: de Lajudie
- 1984–1986: François
- 1986–1988: Laffly
- 1988–1990: Soubirou (****)
- 1990–1992: Derville (**)
- 1992–1994: de Richoufftz de Manin (***)
- 1994–1996: Lecerf (****)
- 1994–1996: Verna (****)
- 1998–2000: Bontoux (**)
- 2000–2002: Bras (***)
- 2002–2004: Margail (****)
- 2004–2006: de Reviers de Mauny (****)
- 2006–2008: Gillet (****)
- 2008–2010: Durieux (****)
- 2010–2012: Fouilland
- 2012–2014: Ozanne (**)
- 2014–2016: Putz (**)
- 2016–2018: Carleton

(**) Officers whom were nominated to Général de brigade. (***) Officers whom where nominated to Général de division. (****) Officers whom were nominated to Général de corps d'armée. (*****) Officers subsequently promoted to Général d'armée. Officers nominated to Marshals of France

== Gallery ==
=== 19 century ===
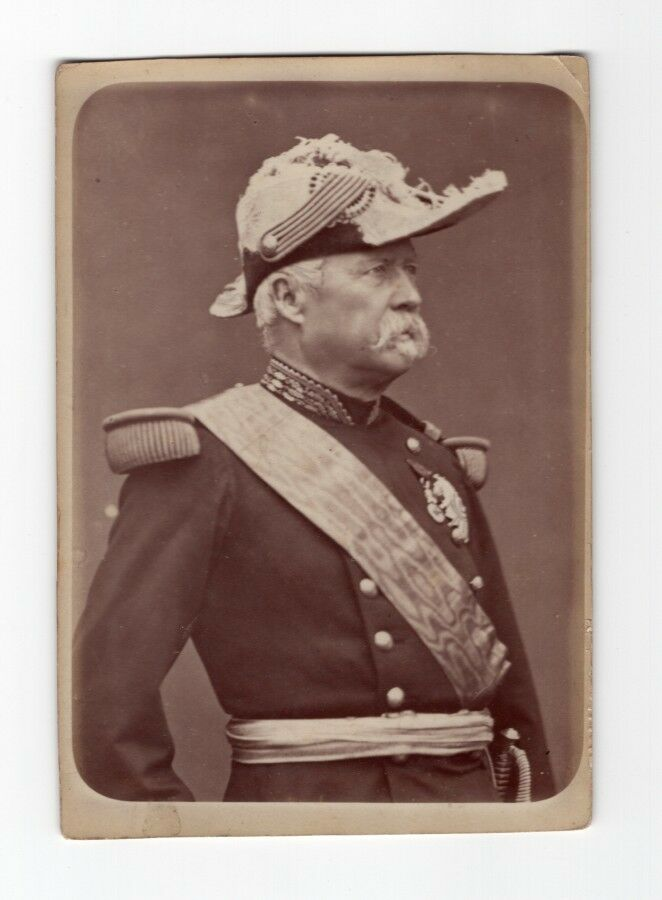
Marshal of France, President of France
de MacMahon. The Duke of Magenta.

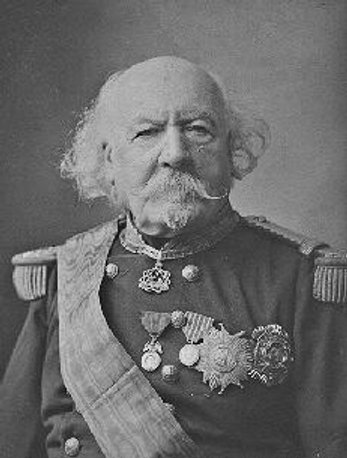
Marshall of France de Canrobert.

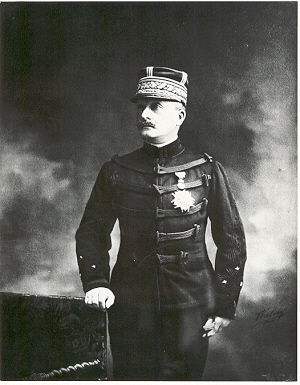
général
de Négrier, 1880.

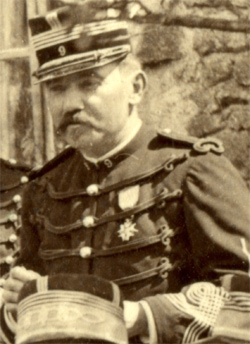
Général Gillet in 1891.

=== 20th century ===
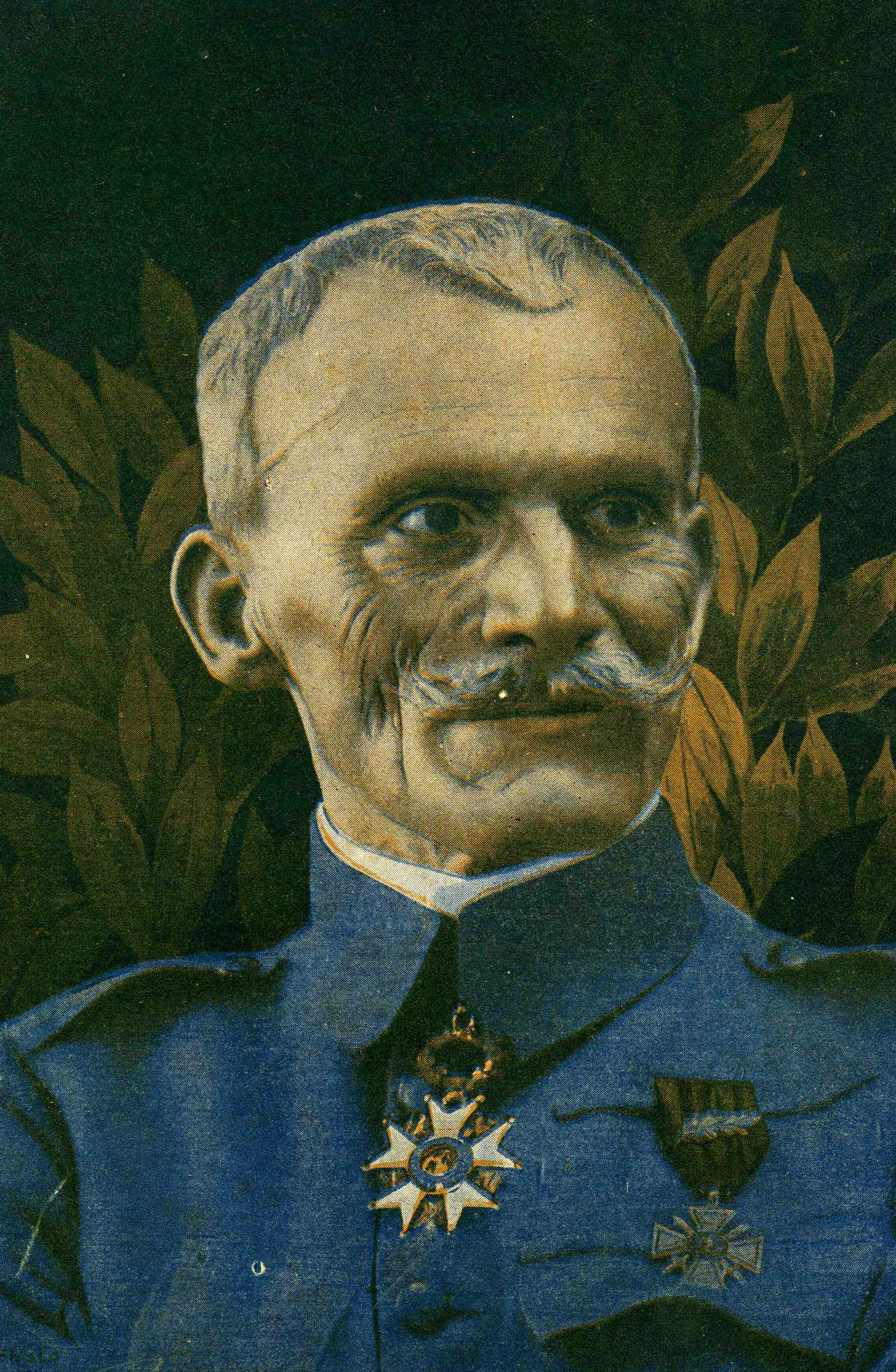
général Brulard in 1918.

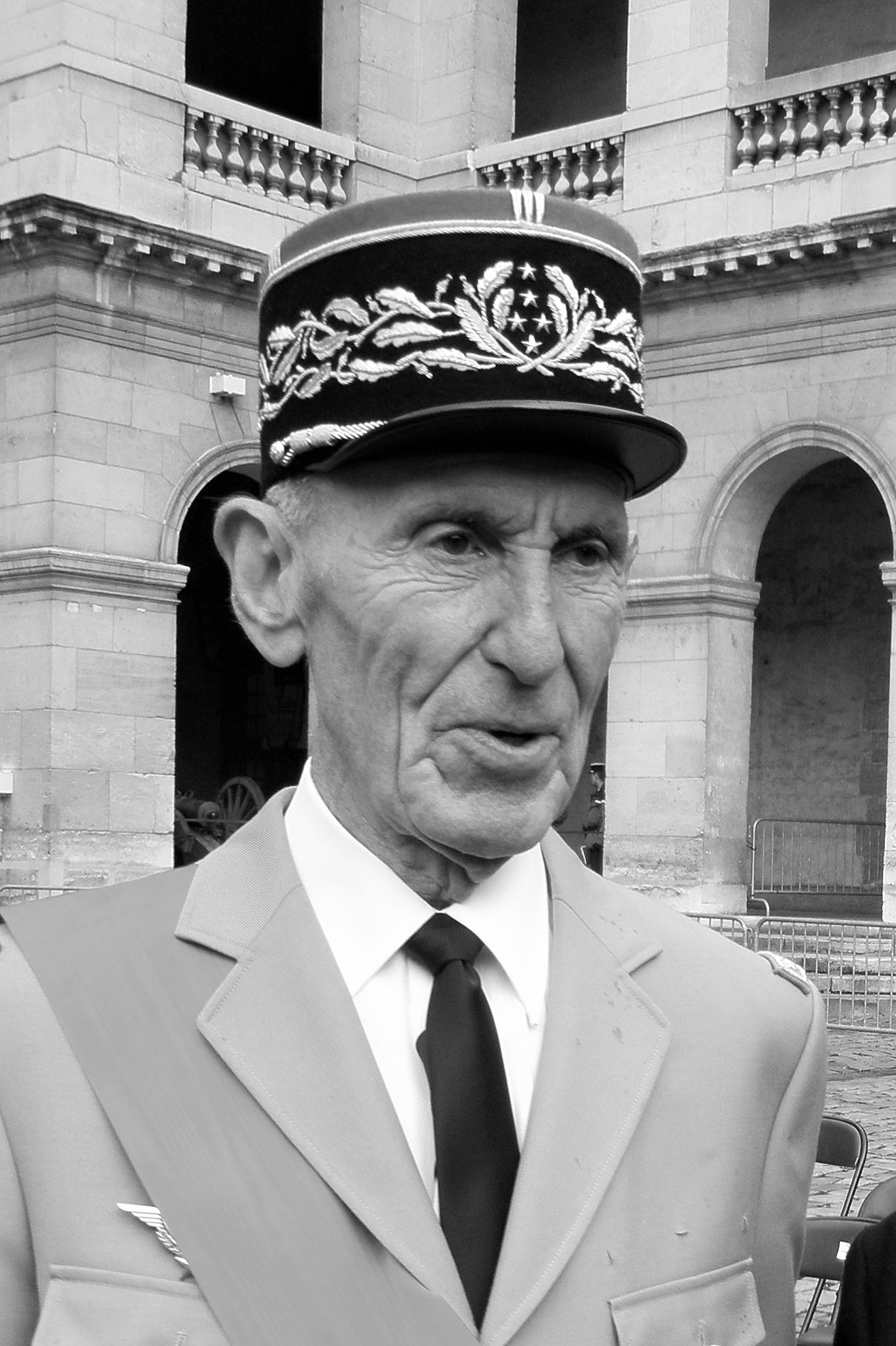
Général Servranckx at Les Invalides in 2007.

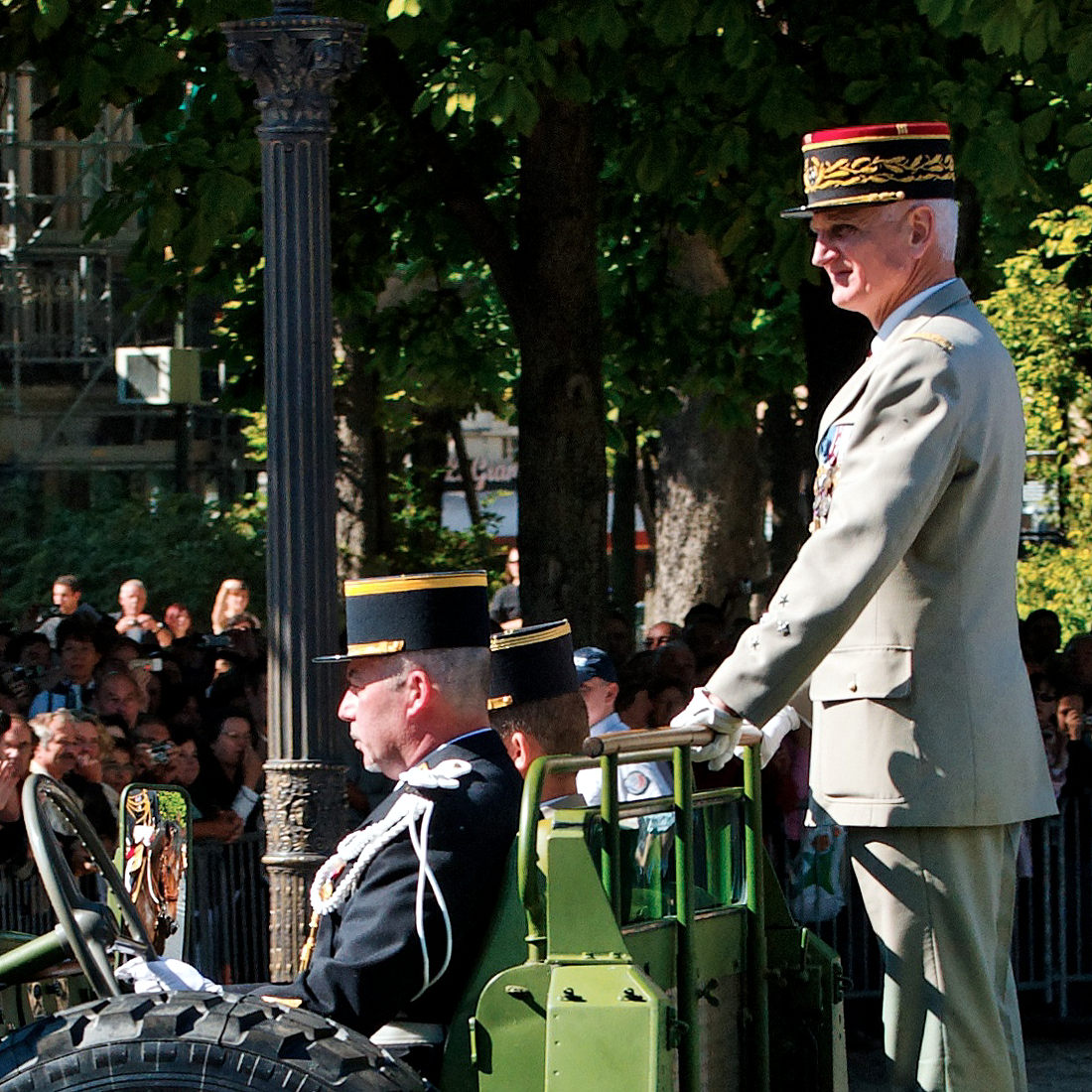
Général Dary served in the 2nd Foreign Regiment; 2nd Foreign Infantry Regiment in 1980; in Haute-Corse from 1975 to 1977 prior serving in the 2nd Foreign Parachute Regiment in Haute-Crose.

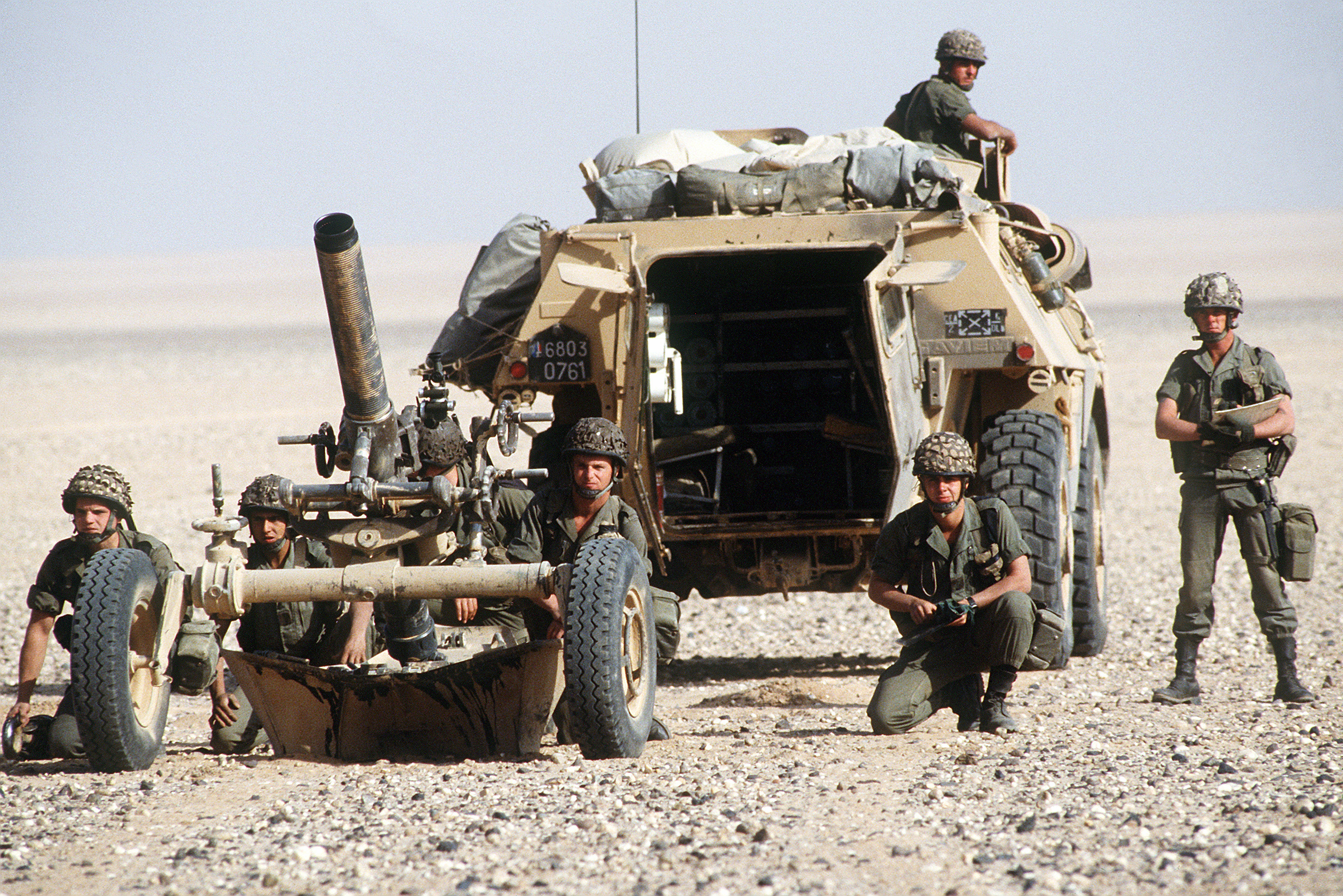
Mortier 120mm Rayé Tracté Modèle F1 in Operation Desert Shield, 1990.

=== 21st century ===
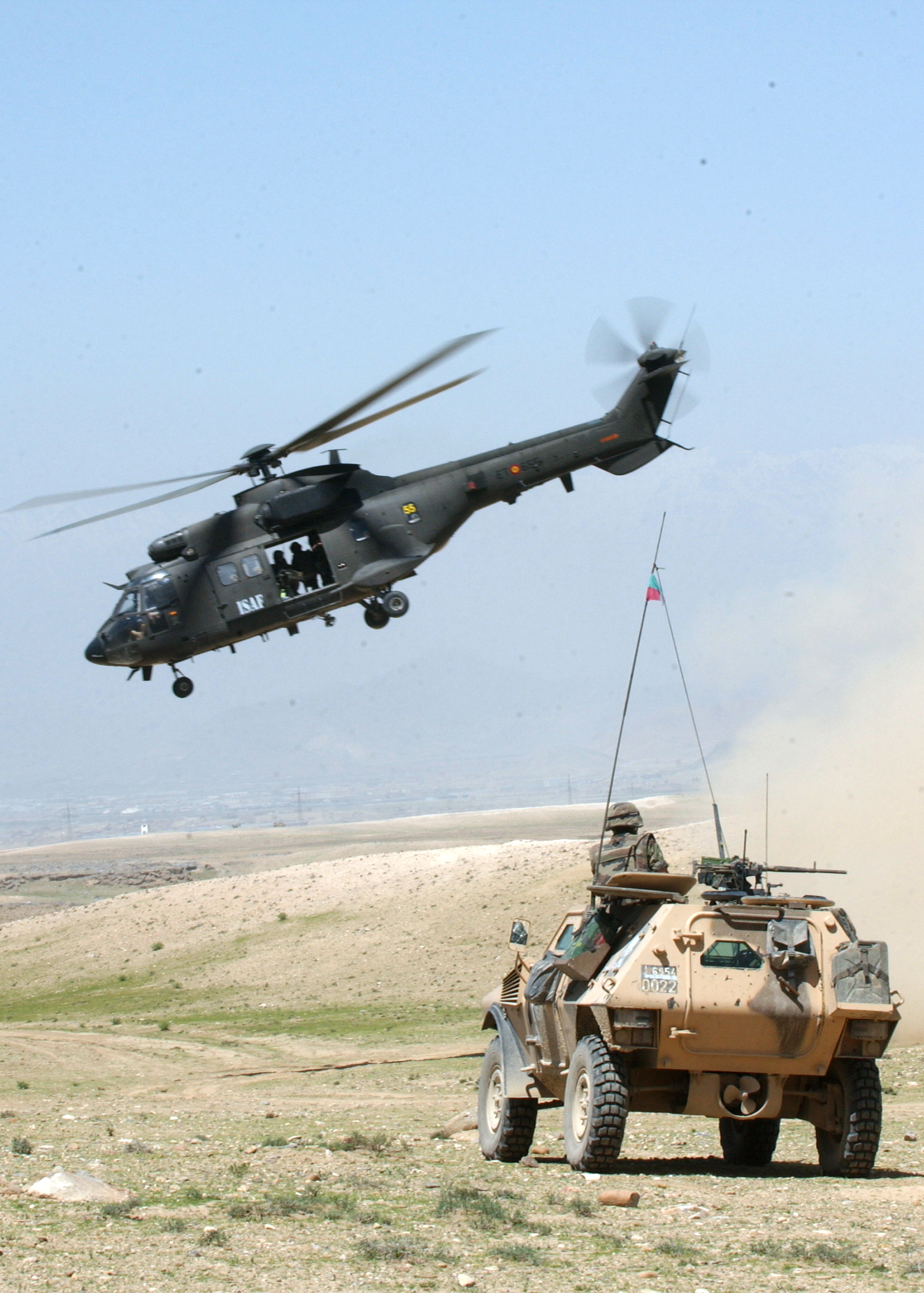
Spanish Cougar passing by a VBL of the 2e REI in Afghanistan, 2005.

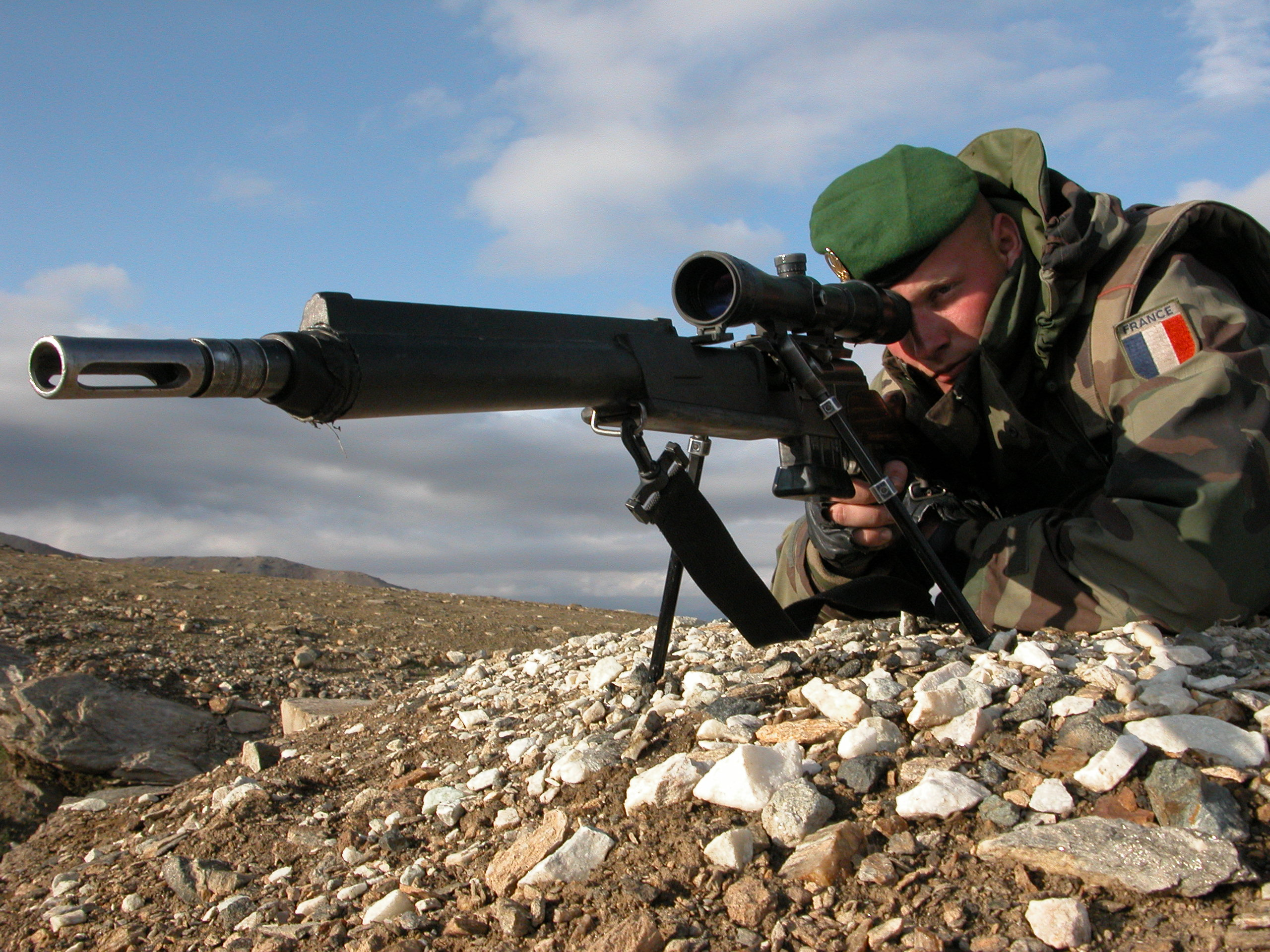
Sniper of the 2e REI with the FR F2 in Afghanistan, 2005.

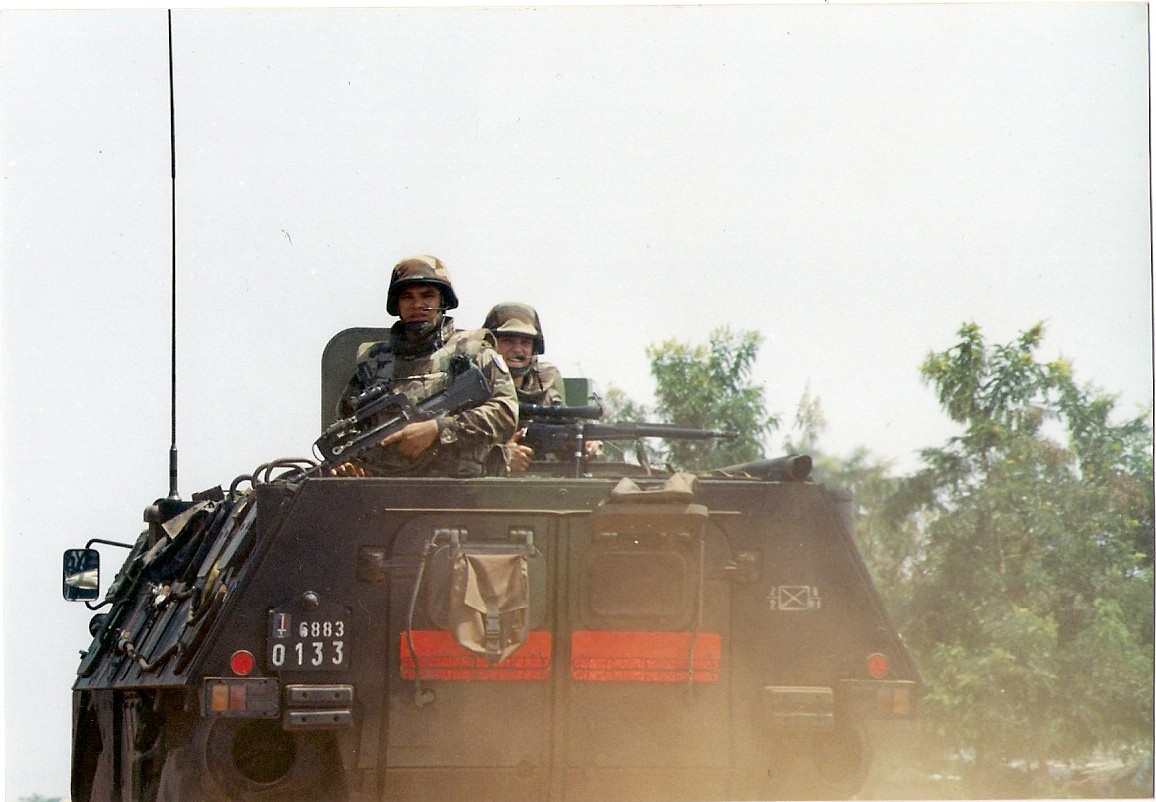
VAB from 2nd company, 2e REI, in the Ivory Coast, April 2013.

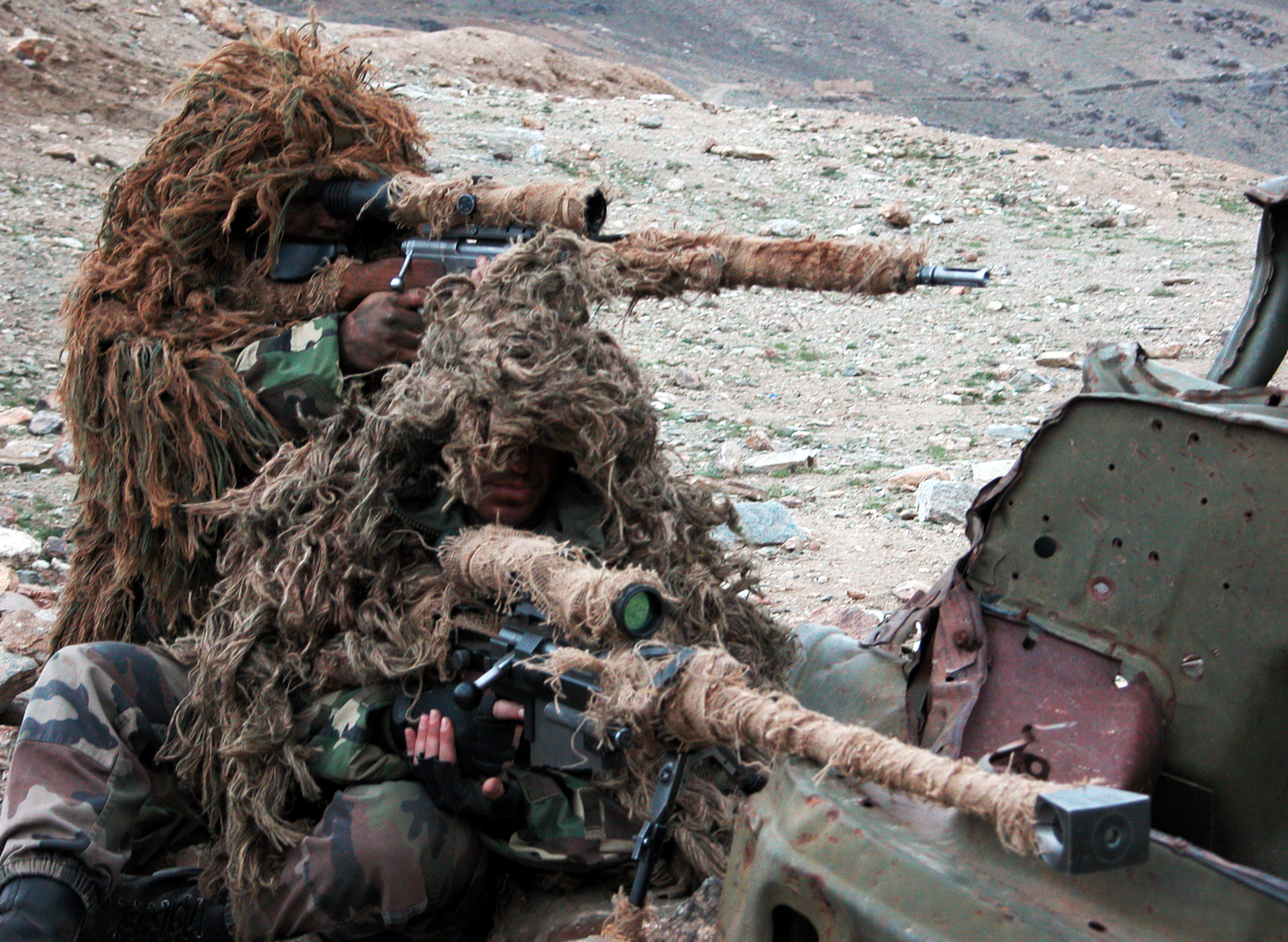
Snipers of the 2e REI with PGM Hécate II and FR F2 sniper rifles in Afghanistan, 2005.

== Notable people who served in the Regiment ==
- Edouard Daladier, Sergeant 1914–1915.
- Lt. Col. Henri Gaston Louis Victor Grosdidier (1895–1923), Knight of the Légion d'Honneur with Palmes. Croix de Guerre.
- Pierre Jeanpierre, commander of the 1er BEP and 1er REP, KIA in Algeria in 1958.
- René Lennuyeux, Lt. Col. 2nd Foreign Infantry Regiment 1946–1949.
- Peter J. Ortiz, adventurer, OSS agent and movie star.
- Pierre Segretain, commander of the 1er BEP, KIA in the Battle of Route Colonial 4 in 1950.
- Général Charles Alexis Vandenberg, Colonel in 1912 in Morocco.
- Captain Marie Louis Joseph Vauchez.
- Général Félix de Vial as Lieutenant in 1905 at Tiaret, Laghouat.

== Alliances ==
- United Kingdom – The Rifles (Bond of Friendship)

== See also ==
- French Army
- Major (France)
- Music of the Foreign Legion (MLE)
- Armoured Train of the Foreign Legion
- 5th Heavy Weight Transport Company (CTGP)
- Swiss Guard
- Honneur et Fidélité
- Moroccan Division (France)
