= Disciplinary Company of the Foreign Regiments in the Far East =

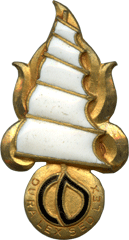
- Company Insignia
- Active: 1946–1954
- Disbanded: August 11, 1954
- Country: France
- Branch: (France) French Army
- Type: Penal military unit
- Part of: French Foreign Legion
- Garrison/HQ: Tagne Island, Cam Ranh Bay, French Indochina
- 7 Flames Grenade, Junk Ship, White Sail, CD: « DURA LEX SED LEX » (La); The Law is harsh, but it is the Law

The Disciplinary Company of the Foreign Regiments in the Far East (French: Compagnie disciplinaire en Extrême-Orient, CDRE/EO) created on June 1, 1946, was the disciplinary company for serious French Foreign Legion offenders in the Far East. It was located on Tagne Island in Cam Ranh Bay.

Attached to the 2nd Foreign Infantry Regiment, the company depended on the battalions implanted in Central Vietnam. After the 1st battalion, the disciplinary mission was transferred to the 4th, which arrived in February 1950, being found in Quảng Nam Province. The disciplinary company handled the disciplining of all Foreign Regiments present in French Indochina. The CDRE/EO was dissolved on August 1, 1954, while Tagne Island was placed at the disposal of French Navy Commando Jaubert.

== Insignia ==
Golden grenade with 7 flames, the bomb of the grenade carries the black letters « CD » (for (French: Compagnie disciplinaire) - Disciplinary Company) surrounded with the inscription « DURA LEX SED LEX ». in Latin. In front of the flames is detached a white sail. The grenade with 7 flames is the symbol of the Legion; the white sail is that of a Junk ship, which referred to the unit's location on an island, accessible to land only by boat; the inscription means : "The Law is harsh, but it is the Law," evoking the character of the unit. The insignia was created in 1947, by Captain Dutter, Commandant of the CDRE/EO.
