= Magder =

Magder is a surname. Notable people with the surname include:

- Ari Magder (1983–2012), Canadian-born American actor
- Daniel Magder (born 1991), Canadian actor

== See also ==
- Mader (surname)
- Mager
