= Mader (surname) =

Mader, Mäder or Máder (English pronunciation: /'mɑːdær/) is a German surname. Notable people with the surname include:

- Anton Mader (1913–1984), German World War II flying ace
- Asa Mader (born 1975), American film director, screenwriter and visual artist
- Bob Mader (1943–2005), American photographer
- Brenda Mäder (born 1986), Swiss politician
- Charles Mader (disambiguation), multiple people
- Charlotte Mäder (1905–?), German discus thrower, javelin thrower and shot putter
- Carlos Mäder (born 1978) Ghanaian-Swiss alpine skier
- Dave Mader III (born 1955), American stock car racer
- Dominik Mader (born 1989), German footballer
- Doris Mader (born 1976), Austrian Paralympic table tennis player
- Elmar Mäder (born 1963), Swiss military officer
- Ernst Mader (born 1968), Austrian former footballer
- Florian Mader (born 1982), Austrian former footballer
- Franz Mader (1912–1988), German politician and World War II colonel
- Fred Mader (1883–?), American labor leader and organized crime figure
- Georg Mader (1824–1881), Austrian painter
- Gino Mäder (1997–2023), Swiss racing cyclist
- Günther Mader (born 1964), Austrian skier
- Gustav Mader (1899–1945), Austrian bobsledder
- Heidrun E. Mader (born 1977), German Protestant theologian and historian
- Heidy Mader (1961–2022), British physicist
- Heinz Mäder (born 1937), German water polo player
- Hellmuth Mäder (1908–1984), German World War II general
- Janik Mäder (born 1996), German footballer
- Jean-Pierre Mader (born 1955), French singer-songwriter and producer
- John Mader (born 1963), American drummer
- Julius Mader (1928–2000), German jurist, political scientist, journalist and writer
- Karin Mader (1910–1973), Dutch painter
- Kelly Mader (1952–2016), American politician
- Logan Mader (born 1970), Canadian guitarist and music producer
- Malu Mader (born 1966), Brazilian actress
- Markus Mader (born 1968), Austrian football manager and former player
- Max-Emmanuel Mader (1880-1950s), German soldier in the French Foreign Legion
- Patrick Mäder (born 1965), Swiss journalist and retired football goalkeeper
- Rebecca Mader (born 1979), British actress
- Rezső Máder (1856–1940), Hungarian conductor, composer and playwright
- Ruth Mader (born 1974), Austrian film maker and screenwriter
- Stacy Mader, Australian astronomer, first Aboriginal Australian to obtain a PhD in astronomy
- Tomáš Máder (born 1974), Czech former slalom canoeist
- Troy Mader (1955–2016), American politician
- Wilhelm Mader (died 1450), German Roman Catholic prelate and Auxiliary Bishop of Augsburg
- Xavier Mader (1789–1830), French wallpaper designer

== See also ==
- Mader (disambiguation)
