= Louis-Antoine Gaultier =

Louis-Antoine Gaultier
- Born: 25 September 1898; Guelma, Algeria
- Died: 11 March 1970 (aged 71); Toulon, France
- Military career
- Allegiance: France
- Branch: French Army; French Foreign Legion
- Service years: 1917–1955
- Rank: Général de brigade
- Nicknames: Le Magnifique "The Magnificent"
- Commands: Communal Depot of the Foreign Regiments; DCRE (1945–1949); 1st Foreign Infantry Regiment; 1^{er} REI
- Conflicts: World War I World War II
- Other work: FSALE President (1966–1969)

Louis-Antoine Gaultier (1898–1970) was a général of the French Army who served mainly in the French Foreign Legion.

== Military career ==
=== World War I ===
Louis-Antoine prepared the admission entrance of École spéciale militaire de Saint-Cyr when he was mobilized in 1917. Assigned to the 4th Zouaves Regiment (French: 4^{e} Régiment de Zouaves), he was promoted to caporal (corporal) then sergent (sergeant) and aspirant at the end of the war.

Nominated as a sous-lieutenant on 1 February 1919 at the 1st Foreign Regiment 1^{er} RE, he remained in the Legion almost his entire career.

=== Interwar period ===
Nominated as a sous-lieutenant on 1 February 1919 at the 1st Foreign Regiment 1^{er} RE, he remained in the Legion almost his entire career.

He served in Algeria and then Morocco with the 4th Foreign Infantry Regiment 4^{e} REI. Gaultier was promoted to captain on 25 March 1932.

In May 1939, he left Morocco and the legion for a posting with the 91st Line Infantry Regiment (French: 91^{e} Régiment d'Infanterie de Ligne).

=== World War II ===
As of February 1940, he found the legion back again by receiving the commandment of a battalion of the 11th Foreign Infantry Regiment 11^{e} REI during the combats from May to June 1940.

Promoted to the rank of chef de bataillon (commandant – major) on 11 June 1940, he managed to escape after the capitulation of his army corps and made way to join the Zone libre.

He joined the 2nd Foreign Infantry Regiment 2^{e} REI at the beginning of 1941 in Morocco. In 1943, he was assigned to the 3rd Foreign Regiment 3^{e} RE, he joined, with his unit, the Marching Regiment of the Foreign Legion RMLE. Chief of the general staff headquarters of the regiment, he was promoted to lieutenant-colonel on 25 December 1943. With the death of regimental commander of the RMLE, he received the provisionary command of the regiment, from December 1944 to March 1945, prior to command being delegated to colonel Jean Olié.

On 25 June 1945 he was promoted to the rank of colonel at the 21 Line Infantry Regiment (French: 21^{e} Régiment d'Infanterie).

=== After-war ===
In December 1945, he assumed command of the Communal Depot of the Foreign Regiments (French: Dépôt Commun des Régiments étrangers, DCRE) at Sidi Bel Abbès. It was under his command and his impulsion that Képi Blanc, the monthly of the French Foreign Legion.

In 1949, the DCRE became the 1st Foreign Infantry Regiment 1^{er} REI.

He left indefinitely the Legion on 2 June 1950, at the end of his commandment time.

He was accordingly nominated as assistant (French: adjoint) général Commandant of the subdivision of Montpellier, before taking his retirement as général on 1 July 1955.

=== Retirement ===
On 17 September 1966 he was elected as president of the French Foreign Legion Veteran Societies Federation (Légion étrangère) (FSALE).

In December 1969, he left the presidency of the association and died in March of the following year in Toulon.

== Recognitions and honors ==

- Commandeur de la Légion d'honneur
- Croix de guerre 1914–1918
- Croix de guerre 1939–1945
- Croix de guerre des TOE
- commandeur de l'ordre du Ouissam alaouite
- commandeur de l'ordre du Nichan Iftikhar

He received a total of 11 citations.

He wrote notably:

- C'est la Légion, Impression française, Marseille, 1972 (with Colonel Jacquot)
- Acte de foi dans la Légion étrangère

== See also ==
- Moroccan Division
- Jean Olié
- Pierre Segrétain
- Pierre Jeanpierre
- Jean-Claude Coullon
