= Foreign Legion Museum =

Coordinates: 43°17′26″N 5°33′26″E

- Musée de la Légion étrangère
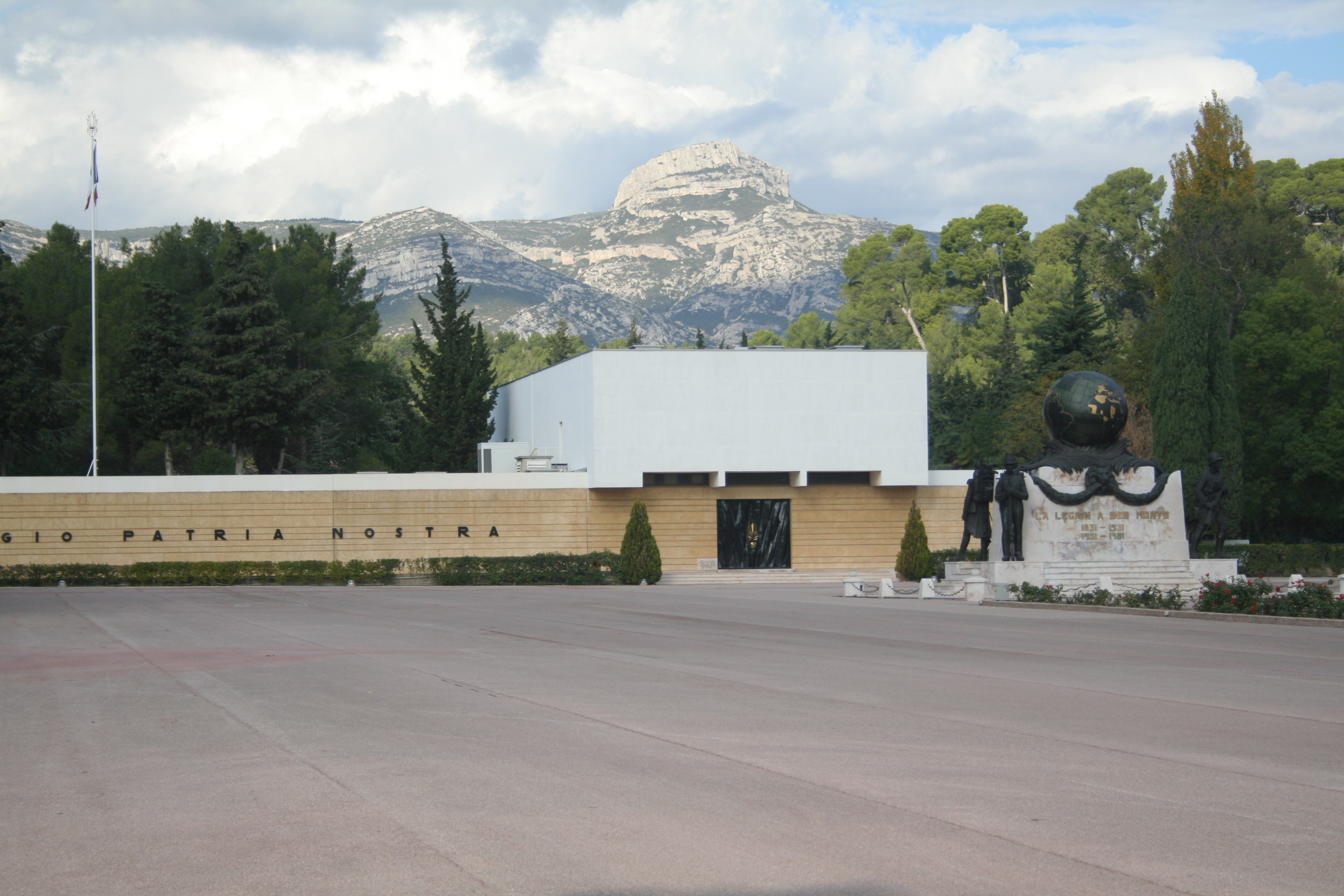
- The museum in 2006
- Established: 1934
- Location: Aubagne, France
- Type: Military museum
- Visitors: 25,000
- Website: www.terre.defense.gouv.fr/legion-etrangere/nos-particularites/musee-legion-etrangere

The Foreign Legion Museum (French: Musée de la Légion étrangère) situated in Aubagne, France, represents the history and "arms history" accomplishments (French: faits d'armes) of the Foreign Legion throughout the course of various collections and expositions. The museum welcomes numerous visitors (almost 25,000 per year), as well as scholars and temporary expositions.

== History ==
The museum is the heir of the Salle d'Honneur ("Hall of Honour") of the 1st Foreign 1^{er} RE created in 1892 at Sidi bel-Abbès, in Algeria. That Salle d'Honneur assumed the current designation on 11 November 1935.

During the repatriation of the Legion back to metropolis, the series collections rejoined France, since 1962. However, in account with delay installations and construction of the new structures (French: bâtiments) at Camp de la Demande, the first stone (French: 1^{re} Pierre), under the presidency of Pierre Messmer, minister of the Armies took lieu in 1964 and the Museum opened doors on 30 April 1966.

In 2003, the Museum was restructured; on another hand, the new organization implicated the creation of support structures. The Society of Friends of the Foreign Legion Museum (SAMLE) (French: Société des amis du musée de la Légion étrangère, SAMLE) was accordingly created at the request of the COMLE. This association ensures the judicial and financial support of the museum (object collections and functioning).

Closed since 12 March 2012, the Museum has been the object of extension works since January 2011 aiming to double the surface by the construction of a new wing of 1000 meter squared. This subscription was in lieu to finance this enlargement of 3 million euros. This new museum, designated as « Louvre du Légionnaire » (The Louvre of the Legionnaire), was inaugurated on 30 April 2013 following the arms ceremony marking the 150th Anniversary of the Battle of Camarón.

The museum was opened to the public since 7 May 2014.

== Organization ==
=== The Museum of Aubagne ===
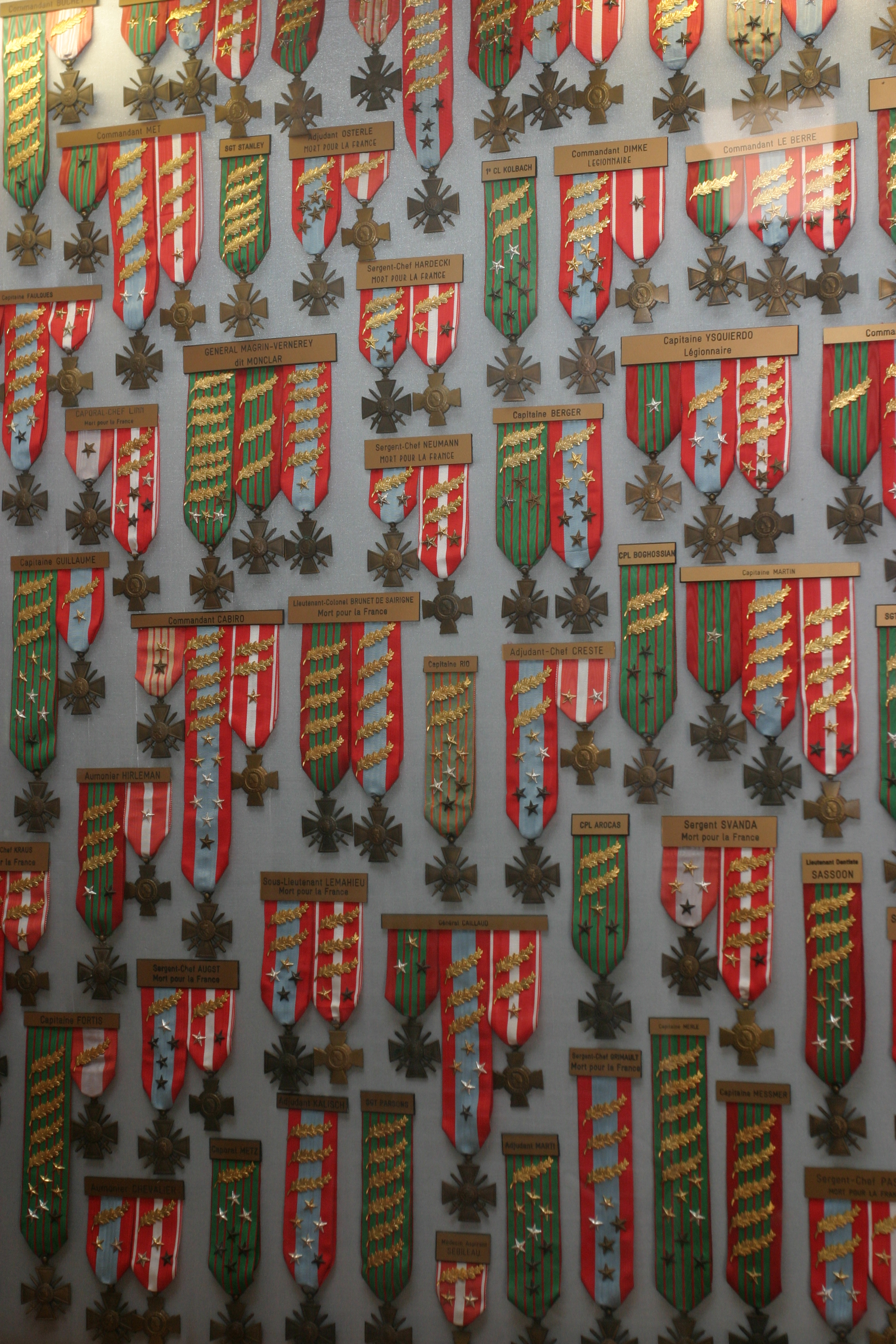
Medals on display at the museum.

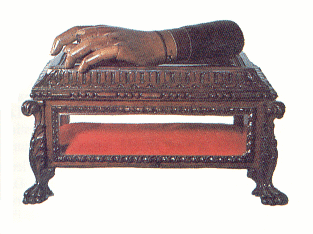
Wooden hand of Captain Jean Danjou.

The ground floor is articulated around the Salle d'Honneur (Honorary Hall). This Honorary Hall is the passing cornerstone of all Legionnaires. This Honorary Hall is engraved with the names of all Legion Officers who died for France. This Salle d'Honneur conserves the wooden hand of Legion Officer Captain Danjou, relic of the Legion, presented to the troops of men during the solemn ceremony of Camarón, on 30 April.

The ground floor also features the decorations hall as well as the museum boutique store.

The first floor features the battle campaigns hall, organized within a chronological order and occupies in space the entire floor, through displays, with different époques as well as the different conflicts throughout the course which the Legion illustrated capability.

The courtyard of the museum is occupied with tanks and cannons types belonging to different campaign eras and also house a couple of tombstones, brought forth from far away distant campaigns. The back of the Museum, giving on the arms place (French: Place d'armes) of the 1st Foreign Regiment 1^{er} RE, opens on the Monument morts de la Legion, grand sculpture Pourquet (French: Pourquet), representing a world map guarded by four legionnaires and inaugurated in 1931 during the centennial commemoration of the Legion at Sidi bel-Abbès. This entire world map sculpture was entirely demounted to be transported during the move of 1962.

=== The Legionnaire Uniform Museum ===
Hailing from a private collection, the legionnaire uniform museum is an extension of the Legion museum delocalized at the corps of the Institution des Invalides de la Legion Etrangere. The museum regroups 120 mannequin, illustrating the evolutions of the uniforms since the creation of the Foreign Legion in 1831 until the modern presently époque.

=== Center of documentation ===
The center of documentation, directed by the adjoint of the conserving authority of the Museum, is a working space allowing research historians, authors, conference delegates and scholars to pour themselves into the depth of documentaries housed by the Legion.

Containing over 4,500 books and 10,000 cataloged items, the documentation center is responsible for cataloging and preserving the institution's media collection.

Consultations have lieu under the authorization of the général Commandant of the Legion.

Salle d'Honneur;

Each Legion regiment houses a regimental Salle d'Honneur (Regimental Honorary Hall), in form of a museum, along with a regimental memorial dedicated to the respectful regiment.

== Gallery ==
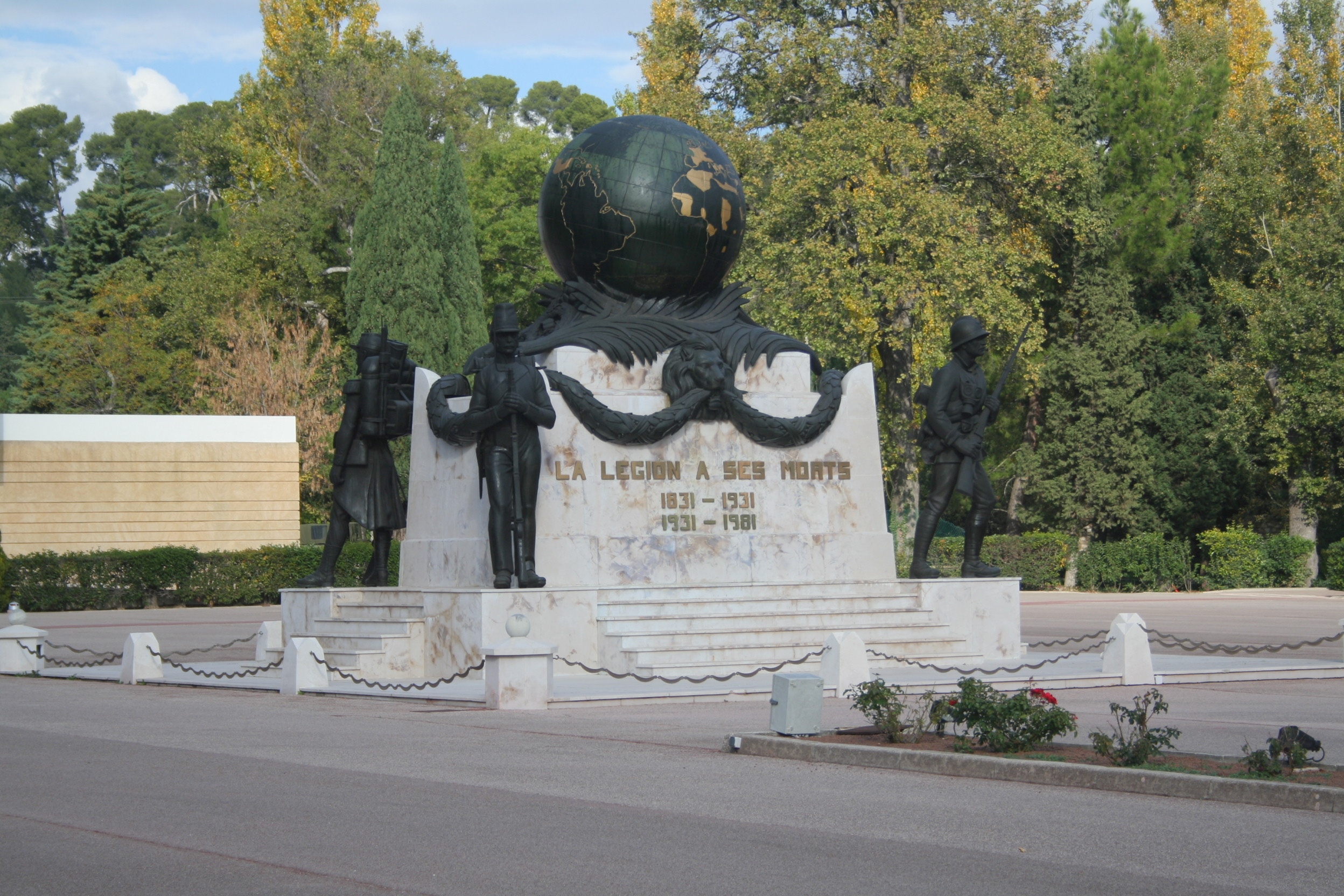

=== Uniforms ===
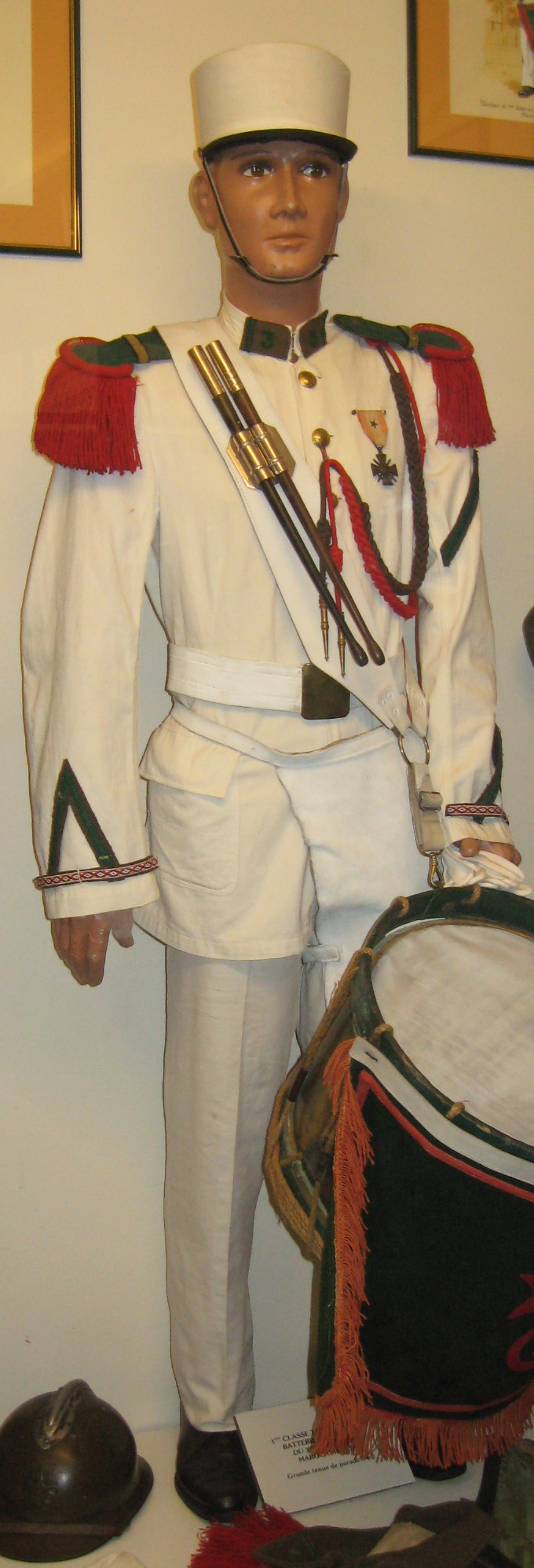
1^{re} Classe Legionnaire tambour du 3^{e} REI – 1931–1939 – Morocco

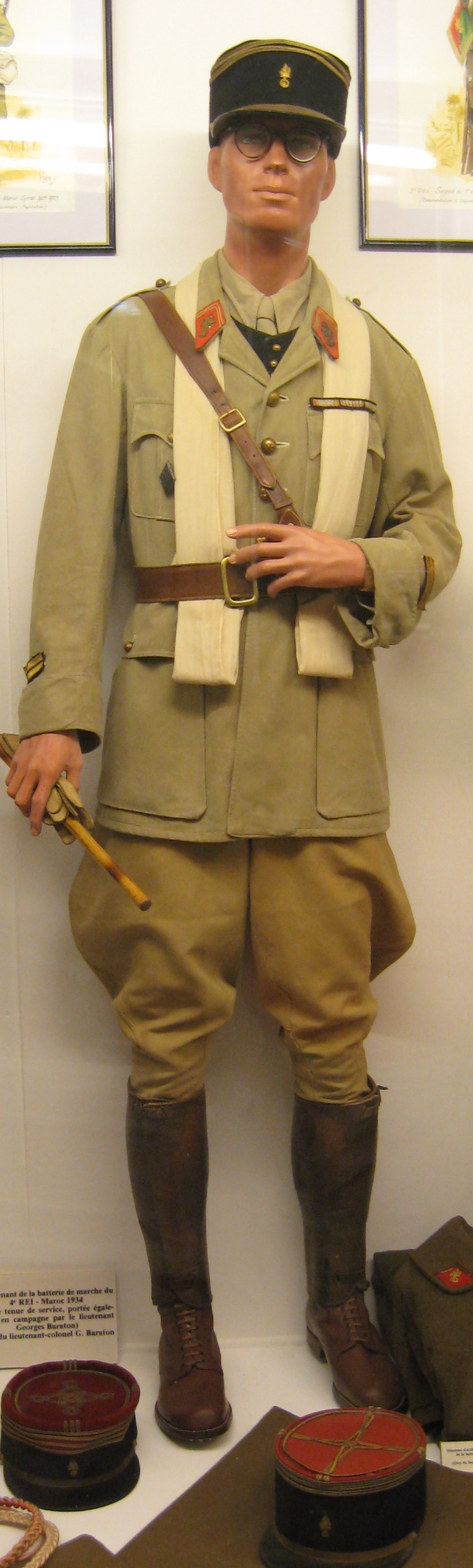
Lieutenant de la batterie de marche du 4th Foreign Infantry Regiment, 4^{e} REI – 1934 – Morocco

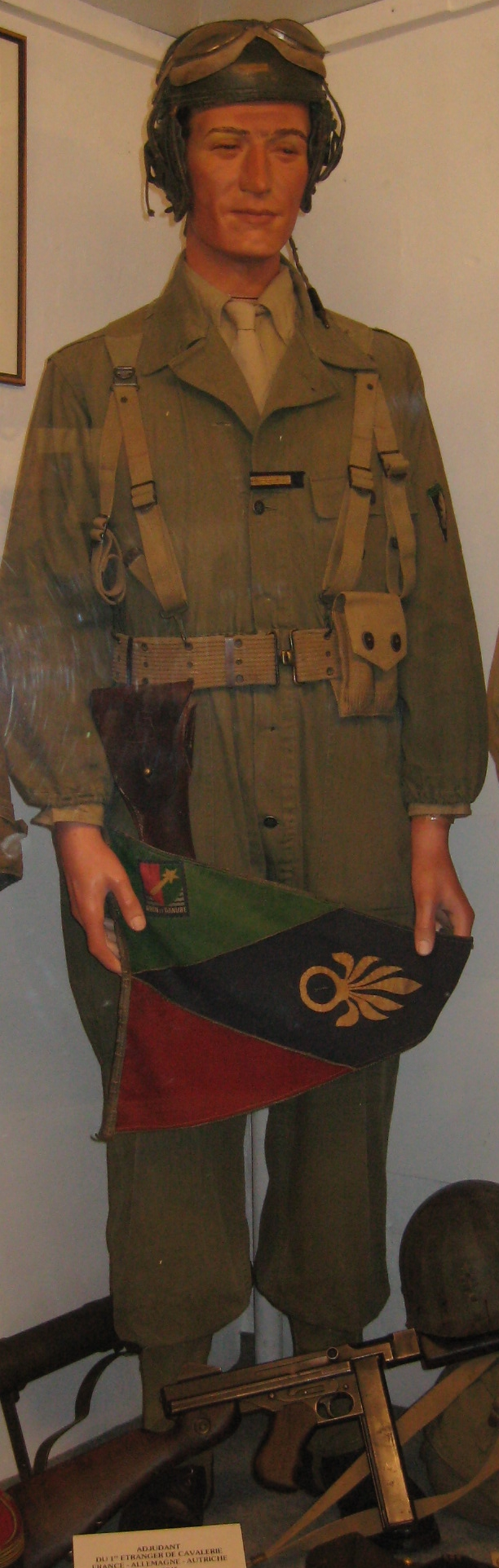
Adjudant du 1^{er} REC – 1944–1945 – campagne de France et Allemagne
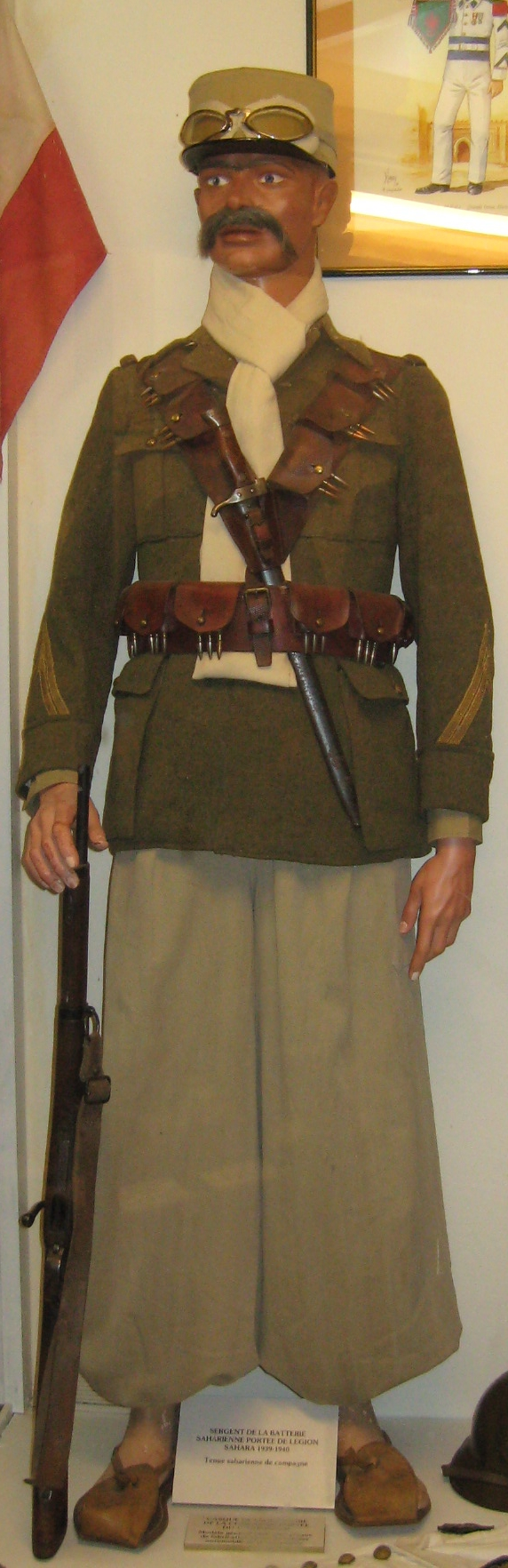
Sergeant de la batterie saharienne portée – Sahara – 1939–1940 (Mounted Saharan Battery)

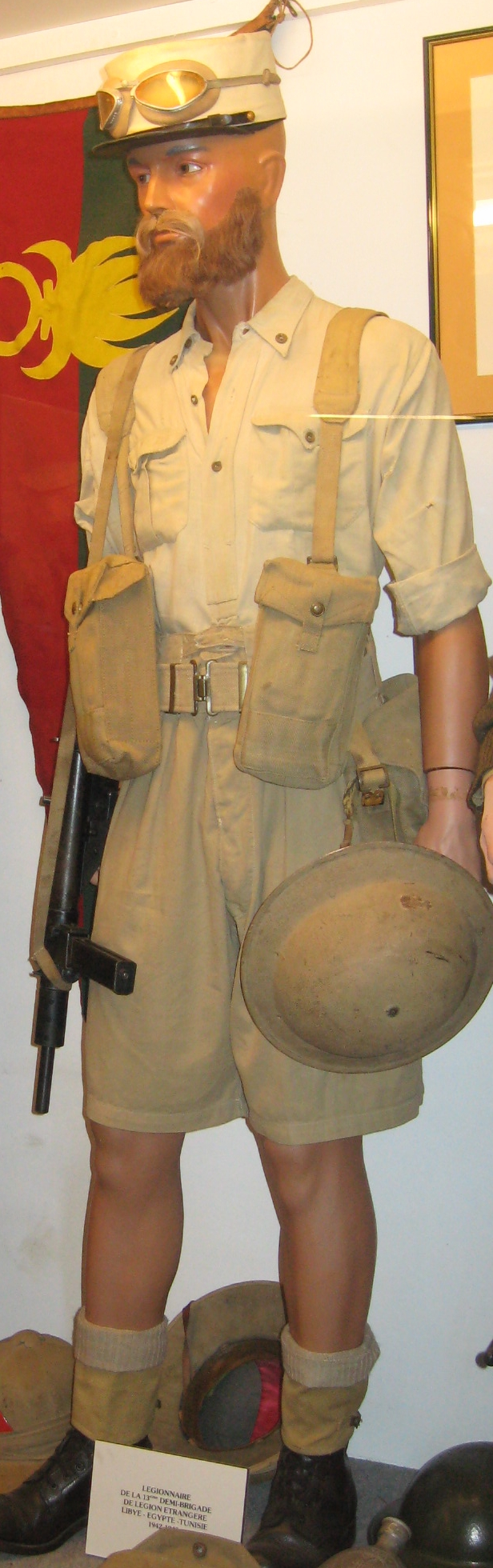
Légionnaire of the 13^{e} DBLE

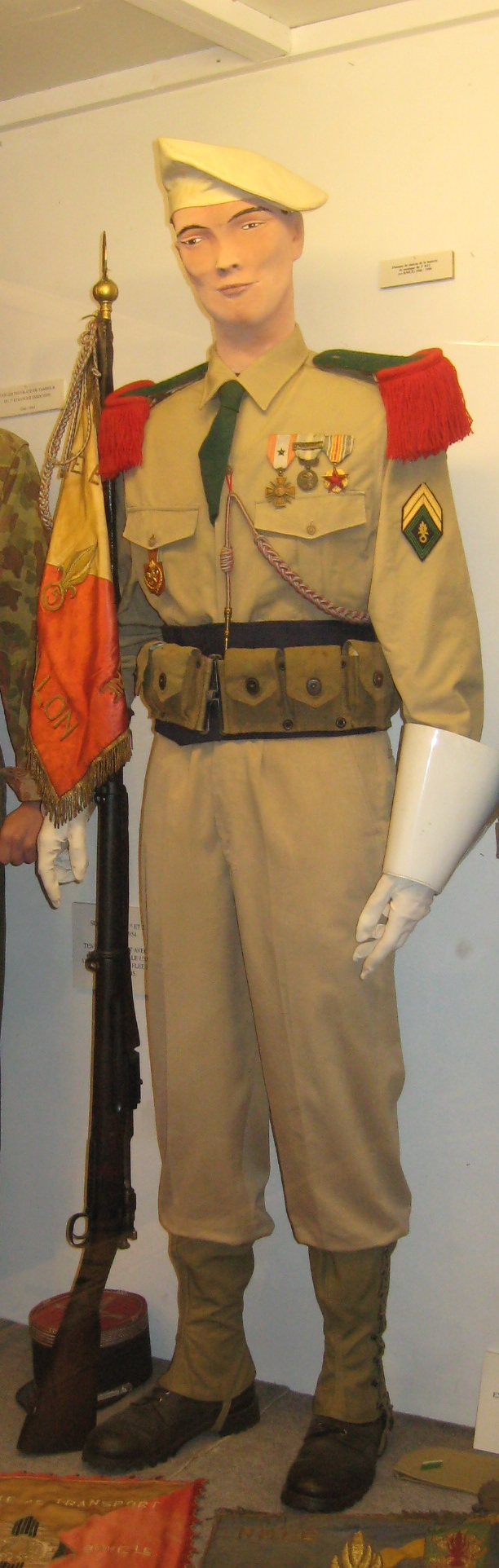
Sergeant du Corps expéditionnaire français en Extrême-Orient – 1949–1952
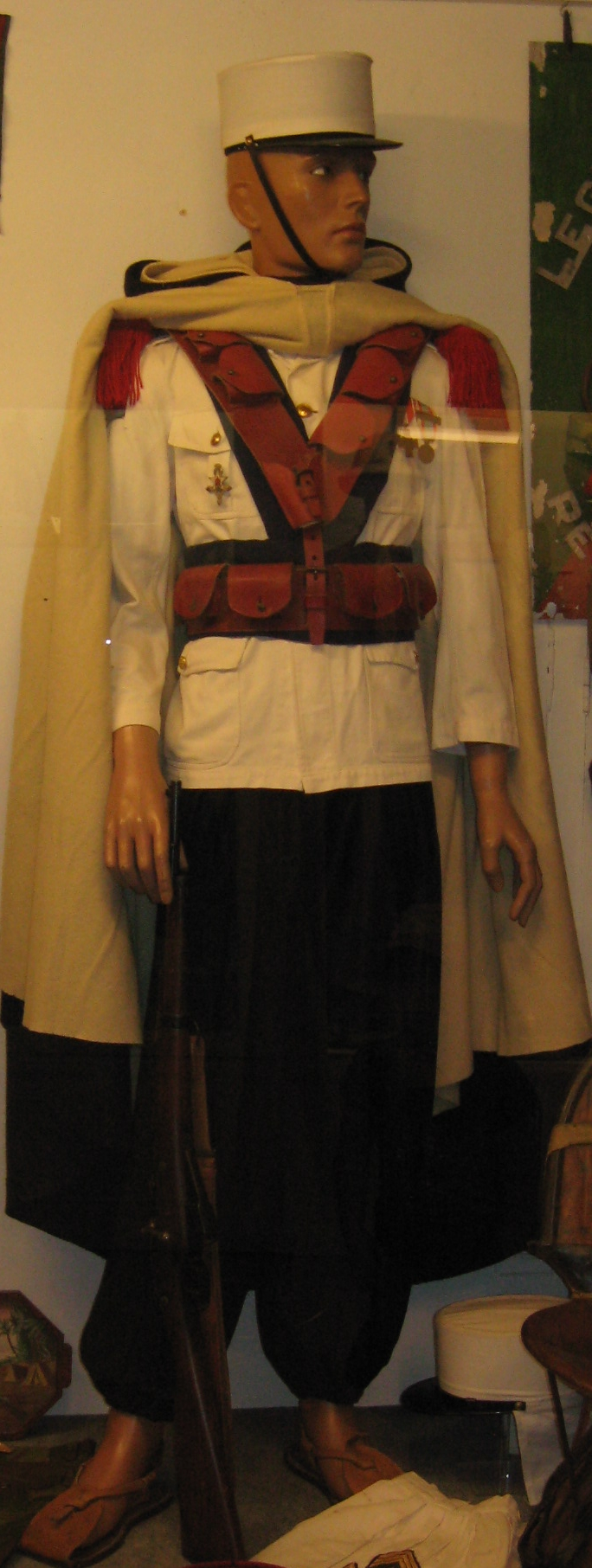
Légionnaire of the Saharan Mounted Companies of the Legion CSPL

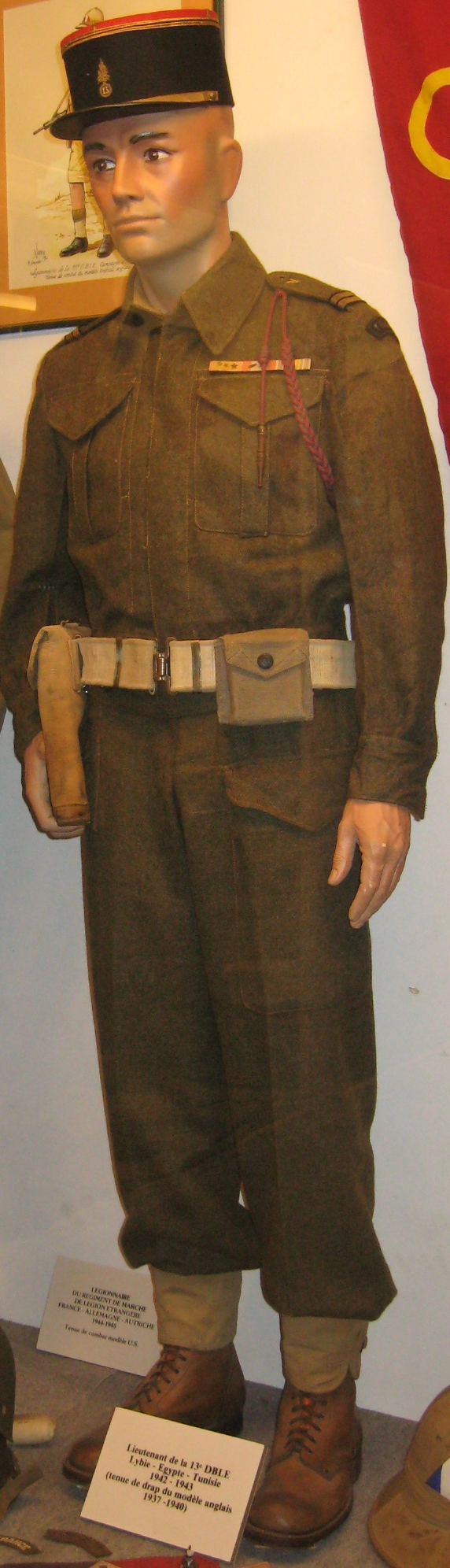
Lieutenant of the 13^{e} DBLE – North Africa – 1942–1943

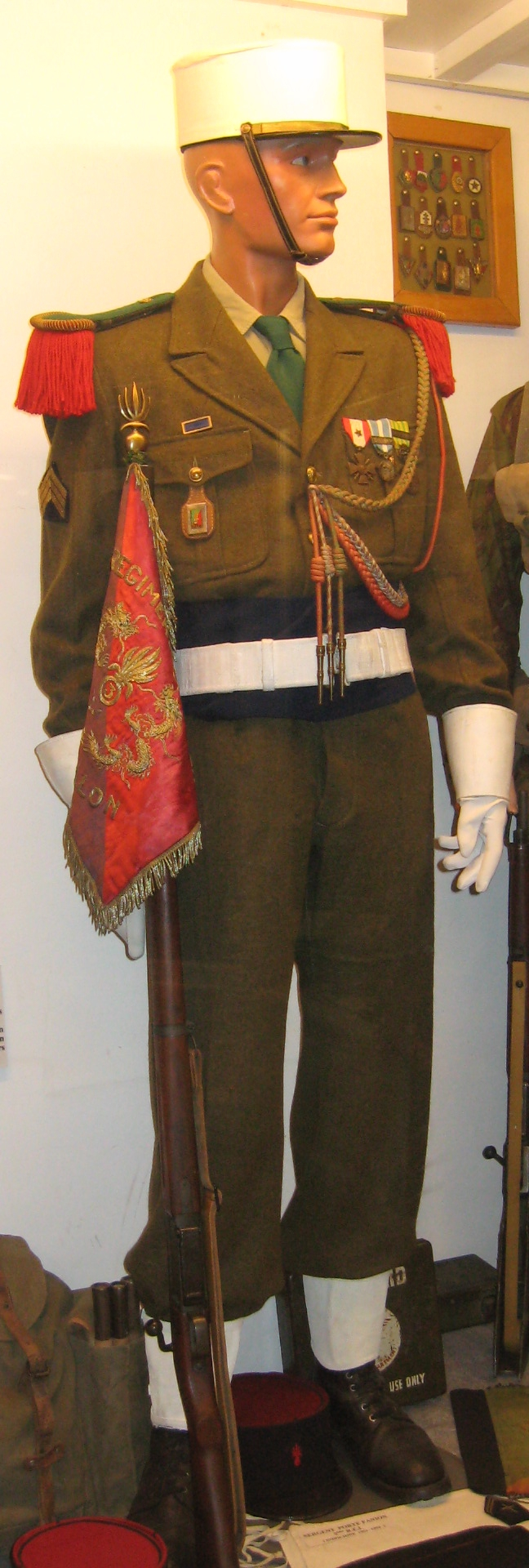
Sergent-chef porte-fanion au 3^{e} REI – 1952–1954 – Indochina

=== Regimental Salle d'Honneur ===
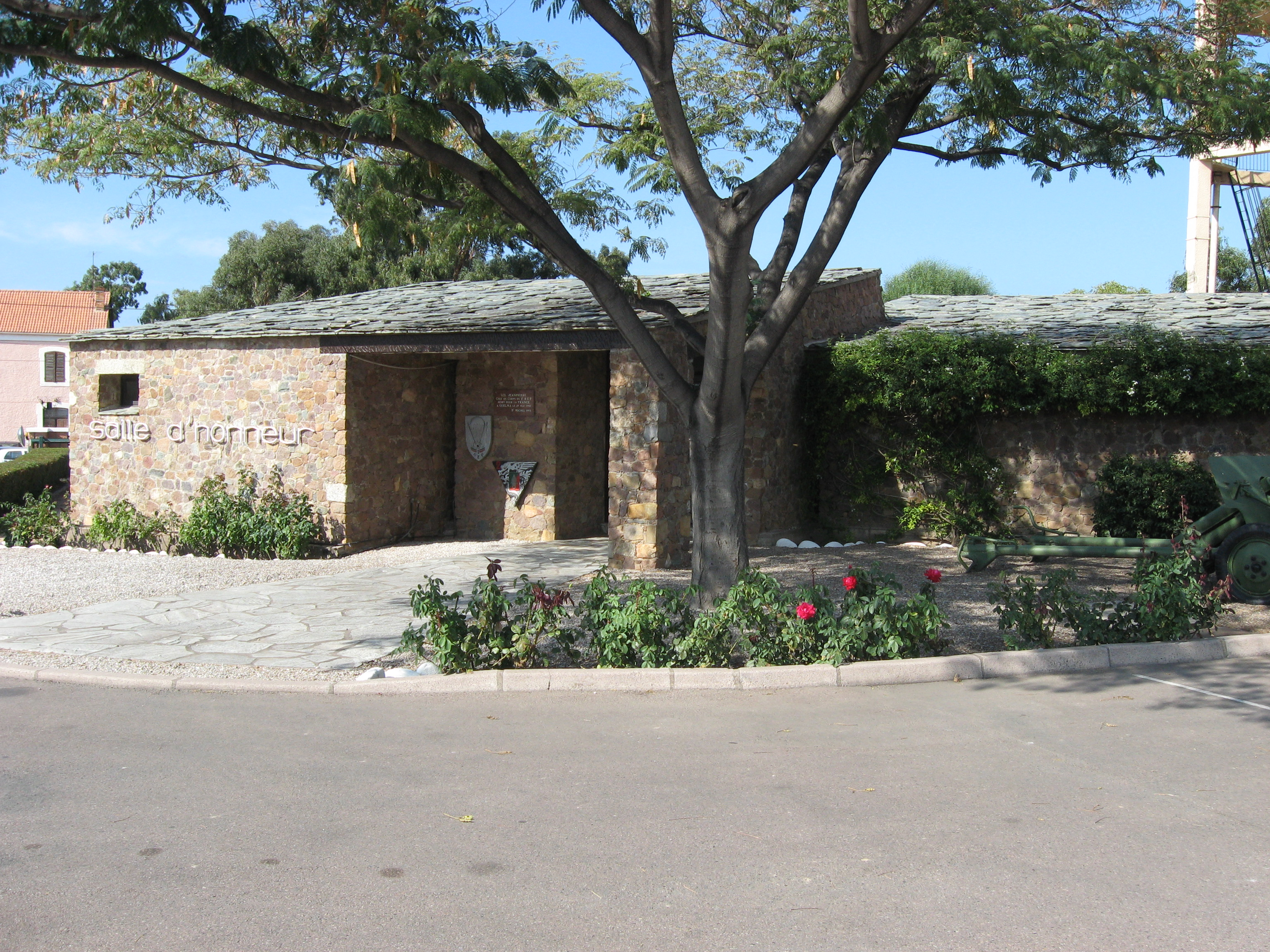
Salle d'Honneur of the CEPs, BEPs, and REPs at Camp Raffalli in Corsica of 2^{e} REP.

== Attendance ==
Attendance figures (2011–2015)
2011	2012	2013	2014	2015
25,304	11,876	?	9,292	18,267

== Temporary exhibitions ==
- 2018 : exhibition Zinoviev – Cendrars
- 2019 :
  - Photos exhibition Caroline Thirion
  - Exhibition Guillaume de Saint-Phalle (sculpteur)
  - Exhibition "Noël légionnaire"

== See also ==
- Major (France)
- Képi Blanc (publication)
- French Foreign Legion Veteran Societies Federation (Légion étrangère)
