= Képi Blanc (publication) =

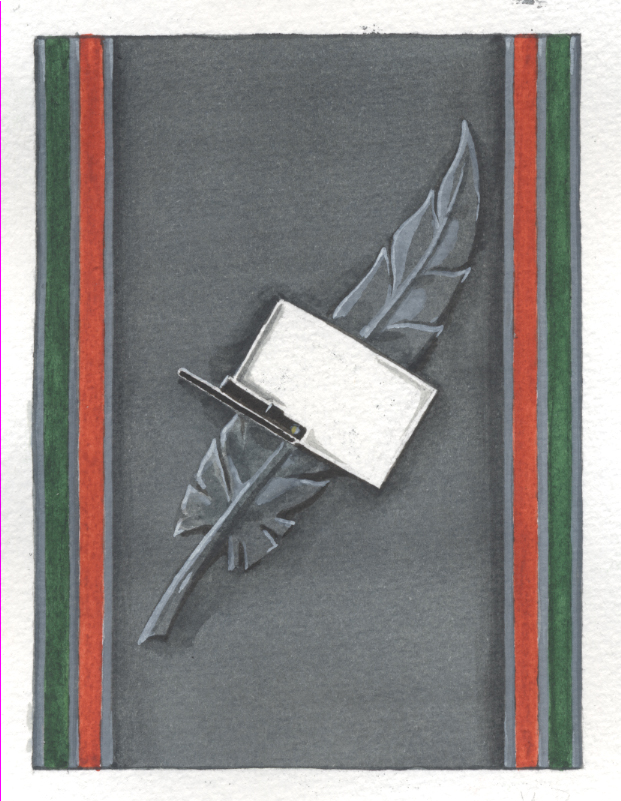
- Unit Insignia of the Képi Blanc staff
- Editor-in-Chief: Captain Montagna
- Categories: Military
- Frequency: Monthly
- Circulation: 11,500
- Publisher: Lieutenant-colonel Thierry Jullien
- First issue: April 30, 1947 under the impulsion of Colonel Louis-Antoine Gaultier
- Company: FELE
- Country: France
- Based in: Aubagne, France
- Language: French
- Website: Képi Blanc Magazine

Képi Blanc is the monthly French magazine of the Foreign Legion in the French Army.

The press magazine is sold exclusively under membership subscription. The subscription fees are channeled to the Foyer d'entraide de la Légion étrangère (FELE) which ensures the functioning of the Institution des Invalides de la Legion Etrangere (IILE).

As of 2013, circulation exemplary is of 11,500 and consists of 80 pages.

== History ==
=== The journal ===
The first bulletin associated to the Foreign Legion was designated as La Légion étrangère, a historic revue and actuality of the Legion, created in 1912. Suspended throughout the course of World War I, the revue was reborn in 1931, at the creation of the Union Veteran Legionnaires Societies (French: Union des Sociétés d'Anciens de la Légion étrangère, L'USAL). In 1945, the revue changed designation to Vert et Rouge which was published until 1959.

On April 30, 1947, under the Quill (French: La plume) of Captain Gheysens, the first editor-in-chief, and mainly at the initiative of Colonel Gaultier, commandant of the Communal Depot of the Foreign Regiments (French: Dépôt commun des régiments étrangers), appeared to be the journal of all foreign regiments of the legion. The journal was accordingly printed in Oran, and was totally independent, with its own presses starting Journal Number 13.

In 1954, the journal changed and passed from a black-and-white format tabloid to that of news, while introducing color.

Despite the cluster of mismanagements (in 1962 from Sidi-Bel-Abbès to Puyloubier, in 1967 from Puyloubier to Aubagne and at last, in 1998 for a change in the interior household of quartier Viénot), the monthly journal of the Legion has never ceased to appear.

Since May 2001, the journal ceased to be entirely autonomous, and the printing was externalized in a civilian printing firm.

Having its own internet site, it is possible to consult a vast array of articles.

The monthly Képi blanc, la vie de la Légion is a reflection of the actual legion and presents a well-rounded contour of activities in the regiments (training, operations), life of senior veterans or the history of the institution. It also plays a pivotal role in keeping a viewing sphere of contact, between the most senior to the youngest, among themselves and the institution.

=== Editors-in-chief ===
Period	Name	Period	Name
1947-1948	Captain Gheysens	1948-1950	Captain Hallo
1950-1951	Captain Hédan	1951-1953	Captain Fourreau
1953-1955	Captain Arnaud de Foïard	1955-1959	Lieutenant Vion
1959-1961	Captain Rodier	1961-1965	Captain Collart
1965-1969	Captain Liege	1969-1971	Captain Petit
1971-1974	Captain Fidel	1974-1977	Captain Guibert-Lassale
1977-1979	Chef de bataillon Estay	1979-1982	Chef de bataillon Baubiat
1982-1986	Chef de bataillon Chiaroni	1986-1988	Lieutenant-colonel Étienne German
1988-1992	Lieutenant-colonel Terrasson	1992-1995	Lieutenant-colonel Peron
1995-1998	Lieutenant-colonel Brunot	1998-2001	Lieutenant-colonel Marquet
2001-2003	Chef de bataillon Fedeli	2003-2004	Captain Messager
2004-2007	Chef de bataillon Carpentier	2007-2011	Chef de bataillon Morel
2011-	Captain Montagna

== Insignia ==
At the occasion of the 60th anniversary of the creation of the journal, on April 30, 2007, a proper metallic insignia for the journal has been created. the French firm produced:

- 10 exemplary in silver;
- 50 exemplary, which were numbered and given to the editors-in-chief in the order of their ascension to the function;
- 300 exemplary, which were numbered in Arabic numerals;
- 300 exemplary, which were not numbered.

The wearing of this insignia is not authorized in uniform for active legionnaires.

=== Symbolic ===
Silver rectangle bordered to left and right by green and red stripes; cast in the middle by an oriented silver quill broached by a Képi Blanc.

Retaken of the regulatory insignia of the COMLE on which is found the logo of the editor-in-chief : La plume et Le Képi Blanc.

== See also ==
- Major (France)
- French Foreign Legion Veteran Societies Federation (Légion étrangère)
- Society of Friends of the French Foreign Legion Museum (SAMLE)
