= Rose Madder =

Rose madder can mean:

- Rose madder, a pinkish color made from madder pigment or dye
- Rose Madder (novel), a 1995 novel by Stephen King

== See also ==
- Madder (disambiguation)
- Madder Rose, American band
