= Foreign Legion Veteran Societies Federation =

Fédération des Sociétés des Anciens de la Légion étrangère (FSALE)
- Formation: December 3 1912; First formation in 1898 (official)
- Legal status: Law of 1901
- Purpose: Federation of Associations of Veteran Legionnaires
- Location: Paris, France
- Region served: worldwide
- Members: 12,000 (2010)
- President: Général Gausserès
- Key people: Général Commandant Rollet
- Affiliations: 195 associations
- Budget: Endowments; Donations, Contributions, Legionnaires
- Website: FSALE; Language Available; French; English; German; Portuguese; Spanish
- Formerly called: La Légion (1898); L'Union des Sociétés d'Anciens Légionnaires (L'USAL) (1931)

The Foreign Legion Veteran Societies Federation (French: Fédération des sociétés des Anciens de la Légion étrangère, FSALE) is an association of the association law type of 1901 (French: Association loi de 1901) federating different representations of veteran Legionnaires (French: Anciens Légionnaires) across the world.

== History ==
If the associations regrouping veteran Legionnaires (French: Anciens Légionnaires) rapidly saw daylight throughout the course of the history of this institution, it was in 1912 where the ancestor of the FSALE was created. The first President was Jacques-Emile Maurer, President of the first friendly veteran legionnaires association, (French: Première Amicale d'Anciens Legionnaires), La Légion, created in 1898.

Due to World War I, the veteran association ceased its activities in 1914. In 1920, a new re-launching tentative was initiated, led by Braunschweig, former secretary general, however the regrouping initiative was not made possible due to the insufficient number of associations available to be federated.

=== L'Union des sociétés d'anciens légionnaires (l'USAL) ===
==== Union Veteran Legionnaires Societies (USAL) ====
In 1931, following the "Centennial Celebration" (centennial of the creation of the French Foreign Legion), général Rollet, Inspector of the Foreign Legion, regrouped a congressional session of the veteran legionnaires uniting more than 200 participants, members of 23 societies, at Sidi bel-Abbès, "Maison mère" of the Legion during that époque.

It was during this occasion, that was decided the creation of a union whose purpose was to federate the different societies and associations of veteran legionnaires. This union was officially created on June 3 1931 under the presidency of Jacques-Emile Maurer. The union counted accordingly 33 associations members.

World War II was the occasion again to place the initiative in a dormant phase.

Since 1945, the veteran members of the USAL regrouped in order to put in place a congressional session which was held in Paris in 1947, and which united 28 societies.

=== La Fédération des Sociétés d'Anciens de la Légion étrangère ===
==== French Foreign Legion Veteran Societies Federation ====
In 1960, the USAL changed designation to French Foreign Legion Veteran Societies Federation (French: La Fédération des sociétés d'anciens de la Légion étrangère, FSALE).

== List of presidents of the USAL and FSALE ==
Name	Portrait	Rank	Tenure
Jacques-Emile Maurer			
Charles Schmid	-	-	1948-1950
général Flipo	-	général	1950-1966
Louis-Antoine Gaultier	-	général	1966-1969
Flipo	-	général	1969-1973
Spitzer	-	général	1973-1977
Jean Nouguès	-	général	1977-1980
Jean Compagnon (Honorary President)		général	1980-1991
Jean Claude Coullon (Honorary President)	-	général	1991-2001
Robert Rideau	-	general	2001-2013
Rémy Gausserès	-	général	2013-present

== Organization ==
The association is not a group of particularities, however regroups associations, the general assembly is constituted of representatives of different associations of veteran legionnaires members at the prorata of their active members numbers.

The functioning is governed by a bureau, the latter having a delegation of the administrative council elected during the course of general assembly.

Each three years, the general assembly takes motion under the form of a national congressional session organized by one (or several) local(s) association(s) (congressional session: 1998, 2001, 2004, 2007, 2010).

== Notable veterans of the institution ==
- Peter J. Ortiz

== See also ==
- Major (France)
- French Foreign Legion Music Band (MLE)
- Képi Blanc (publication)
- French Foreign Legion Museum
- Society of Friends of the French Foreign Legion Museum (SAMLE)
