= Puyloubier =

Commune in Provence-Alpes-Côte d'Azur, France

- Commune
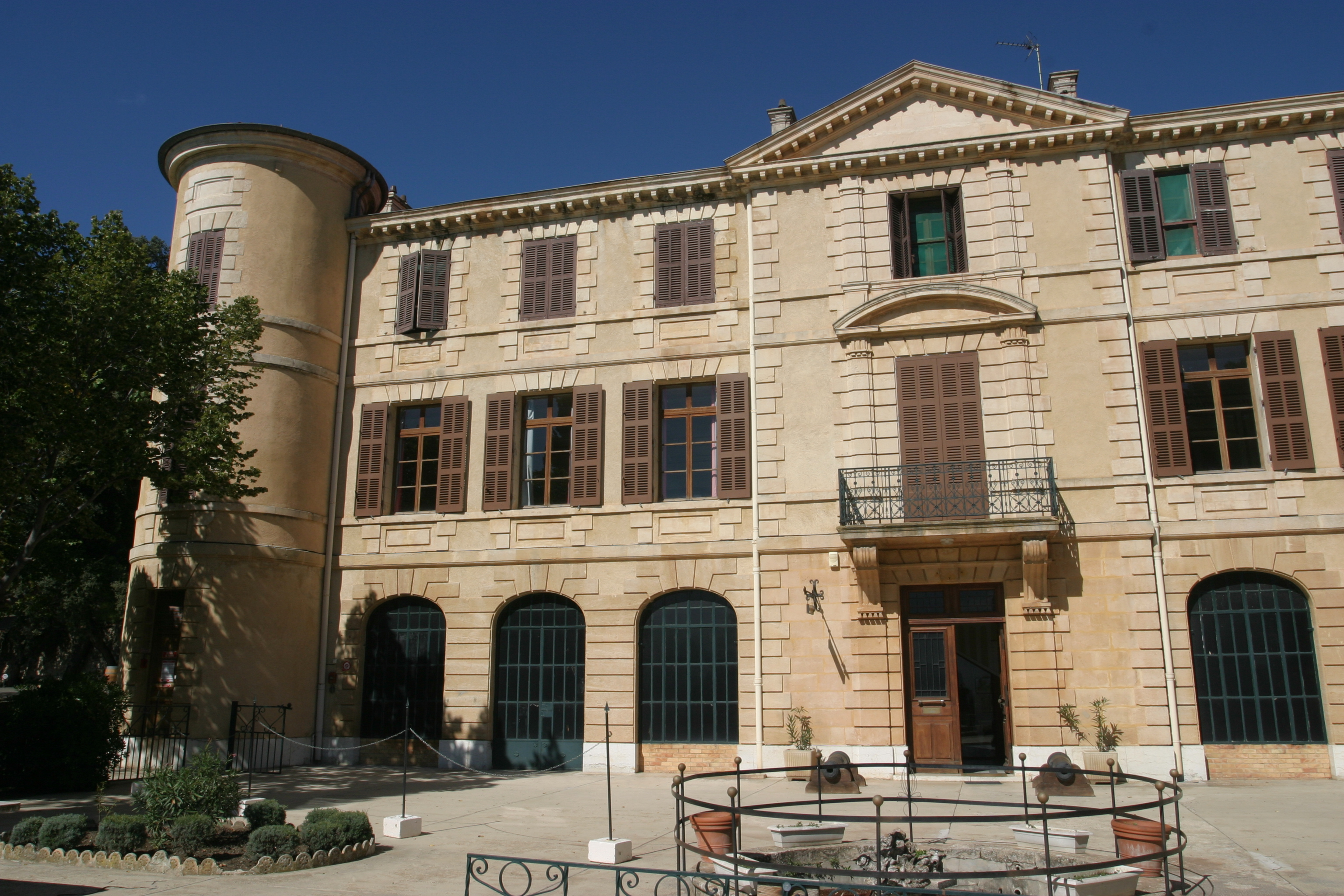
- Foreign Legion invalid home

- Coat of arms
- Location of Puyloubier
- Location within France Location within Provence-Alpes-Côte d'Azur
- Coordinates: 43°31′33″N 5°40′12″E
- Country: France
- Region: Provence-Alpes-Côte d'Azur
- Department: Bouches-du-Rhône
- Arrondissement: Aix-en-Provence
- Canton: Trets
- Intercommunality: Aix-Marseille-Provence

Government
  - Mayor (2026–32): Sébastien Leccia
- Area^{1}: 40.85 km^{2} (15.77 sq mi)
- Elevation: 400 m (1,300 ft)
- Highest elevation: 1,007 m (3,304 ft)
- Lowest elevation: 239 m (784 ft)
- Population (2023): 1,768
  - Density: 43.28/km^{2} (112.1/sq mi)
- Time zone: UTC+01:00 (CET)
  - Summer (DST): UTC+02:00 (CEST)
- INSEE/Postal code: 13079 /13114
- ^{1} French Land Register data, which excludes lakes, ponds, glaciers > 1 km^{2} (0.386 sq mi or 247 acres) and river estuaries.

Puyloubier (French pronunciation: [pɥilubje]; Occitan: Pueglobier) is a commune in the Bouches-du-Rhône department in southern France.

In Puyloubier can be found the Institution des invalides de la Légion étrangère which is a retirement home for former members of the French Foreign Legion.

== Population ==
Historical population
Year	Pop.	±% p.a.
1968	692	—
1975	798	+2.06%
1982	1,121	+4.98%
1990	1,317	+2.03%
1999	1,473	+1.25%
2007	1,708	+1.87%
2012	1,860	+1.72%
2017	1,792	−0.74%
2023	1,768	−0.22%
Source: INSEE

=== Personalities linked to the commune ===
- Servin de Puyloubier, hermit and martyr, killed by the Visigoths.
- Jacques Rigaud, designer and engraver, born in Puyloubier on 1 May 1680, died in Paris on 10 August 1754.
- Jean-Baptiste Rigaud, designer and engraver, born in Puyloubier on 17 April 1720, nephew of Jacques Rigaud.
- Rosalie Margalet, mother of the poet Victor Gélu, costumier, born in Puyloubier on 3 April 1770, died on 7 March 1854.
- Jean Planque, painter and collector of Swiss art, stayed here between 1948 and 1951.
- Francis Méano, international footballer, born in Puyloubier on 22 May 1931, died in a car accident near Reims on 26 June 1953.
- Pierre-Paul Jeanpierre, colonel in the Foreign Légion, killed in combat in 1958 near Guelma (Algeria,) interred in the carré des légionnaires in Puyloubier cemetery.
- Yvonne Gamy, actress, born Marseille on 10 June 1904, died in Marseille on 10 February 1997, was a longtime resident of Puyloubier.

== See also ==
- Communes of the Bouches-du-Rhône department
