= Society of Friends of the Foreign Legion Museum (SAMLE) =

Société des Amis du Musée de la Légion étrangère (SAMLE)
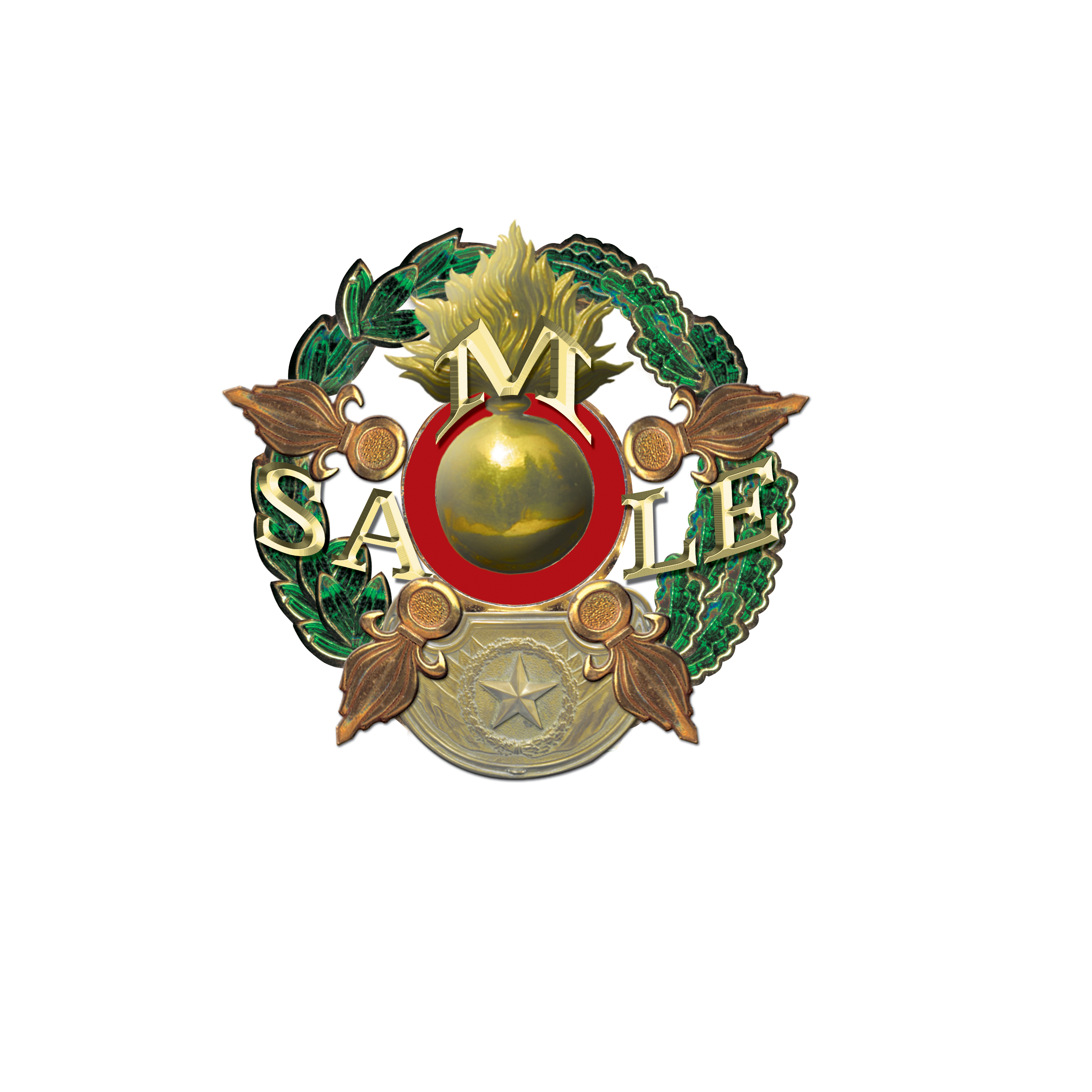
- Formation: 2003
- Legal status: Law of 1901
- Purpose: Conserve, protect and place in value the historic patrimony of the Légion étrangère
- Location: Aubagne, France
- Members: 1,000 (2010)
- President: général Le Flem
- Vice-President: Médecin general Prevot
- Key people: général Commandant
- Budget: Endowments; Donations - Contributions
- Website: SAMLE
- Remarks: Foreign Legion Museum Support

The Society of Friends of the Foreign Legion Museum (French: Société des Amis du Musée de la Légion étrangère, SAMLE) is a French association of the association law type of 1901 (French: Association loi de 1901), created in 2003. Without being attached to the Foreign Legion, the society participates to the support of the Museum. The society is composed of volunteers.

- Founding members: Général Le Flem, Général Liège, Major Remy, Adjudants-chef Szecsko and Adjudant-chef Bickel.
- An administrative council, composed of 15 members elected renewable by tiers, every 3 years, administer the association.
- The général Commandant the Foreign Legion is the right Ex officio member (French: membre de droit). He has the right of veto over the decisions taken in general assembly or administrative council.
- The chief of the patrimony and awareness division of the Foreign Legion and the curator of the Museum, placed under his orders, are consultative members.

== Mission ==
The SAMLE has for mission to sustain and financially support the actions decided by the Director of the Museum (assistant Colonel to the général Commandant of the Foreign Legion) and the chief of the patrimony and awareness division, only capable in taking decisions on the organization of the Foreign Legion Museum or the politics revolving around awareness. This support consists essentially to seek the necessary funds in order to allow the Museum to lead dynamic actions of awareness (temporary exhibitions); or to enrich, repair, protect the permanent collection or the archives.

The action of SAMLE revolves leading actions of profit:

- of the Foreign Legion Museum,

- the annex (uniformologie), garrisoned at the Domain of Captain Danjou, at Puyloubier,

- the legion's regimental Honorary Halls

- the archives of the Foreign Legion

In addition, the society is in liaison with the Foyer d'Entraide de la Légion étrangère (FELE), to maintain the graves, carrés Légion and memorials dedicated to this institution by the world, notably that of Camarón de Tejeda, commemorating the Battle of Camarón in partnership with the Le Souvenir français (French: Le Souvenir français).

Within the general cadres of the veteran associations of the Foreign Legion, the society is a member Foreign Legion Veteran Societies Federation : FSALE

== See also ==
- Major (France)
- Képi Blanc (publication)
