= Mader =

Mader may refer to:

== Places ==
- Mäder, Austria, a municipality
- Mader, the German name for Modrava, a village in the Czech Republic
- Mađer, Serbia, a village

== People ==
- Mader (surname), a list of people with the name
- Mader Moussayev (1947–2023), Azerbaijani businessman and politician

== See also ==
- Mader House, Poughkeepsie, New York, United States, on the National Register of Historic Places
- Madder (disambiguation)
