= Maddur =

Maddur may refer to:

- Maddur, Mahbubnagar, Telangana, India
- Maddur, Mandya, Karnataka, India
  - Maddur railway bridge collapse, 1897
- Maddur, Ranga Reddy, Telangana, India

== See also ==
- Madder (disambiguation)
