= Jean Compagnon =

French general

Jean Compagnon

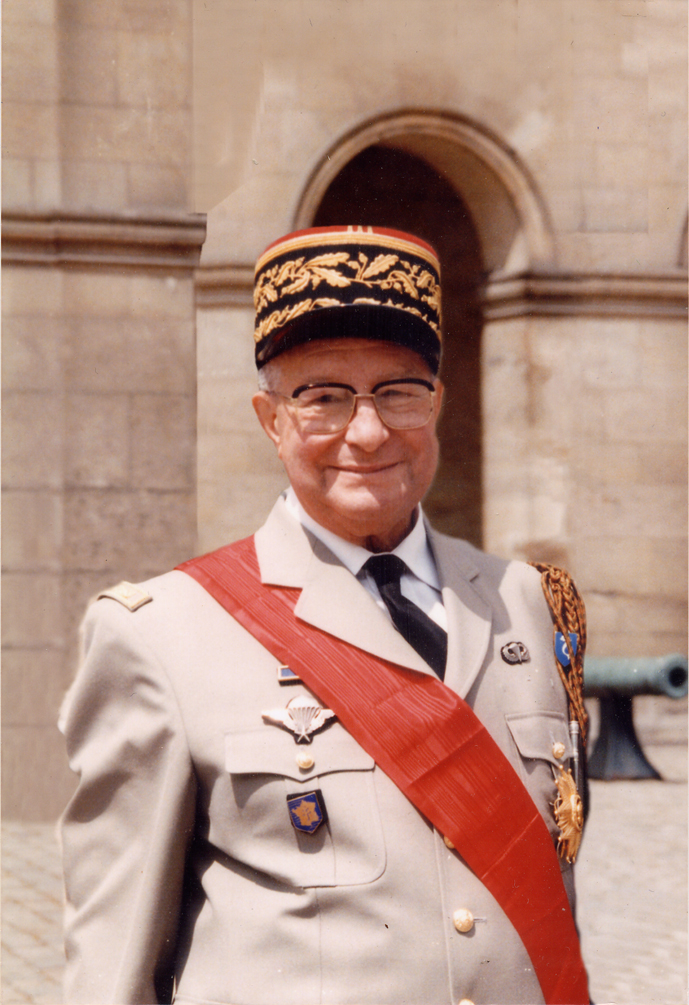
- Born: October 26, 1916; France
- Died: November 4, 2010 (age 94); Paris, France
- Military career
- Allegiance: France
- Branch: French Army; French Foreign Legion
- Service years: 1934 – 1976
- Rank: Général de corps d'armée
- Commands: 2nd Armored Brigade; 1st Parachute Hussard Regiment; 1^{er} RHP; 11th Parachute Division; 11^{e} DP
- Conflicts: World War II: Battle of Normandy; Liberation of Paris
- Other work: History Literature; President & Founder - National Union of the Armored Arm (1979 - 1986); FSALE Honorary President (1980 - 1991); Member of the Académie des sciences d'outre-mer

Jean Compagnon (26 October 1916 – 4 November 2010) was a French officer and Général de corps d'armée.

== Biography ==
=== Early life ===
Jean, Georges, André Compagnon was the son of colonel Marcel Compagnon and Lucie Dehesdin. He conducted his secondary studies at Collège Gerome.

=== Family ===
He married twice and is survived by six children.

== Military career ==
=== Early military career ===
Saint-Cyrien of the promotion « King Alexander I of Yugoslavia » (1934-1936), Jean was commissioned as a Sous-lieutenant in 1936.

Assigned to the 4th Hussar Regiment 4^{e} RH from 1937 to 1940, he was promoted to the rank of lieutenant on October 1, 1938. In 1940, he combat engaged in Lorraine and on the Somme at the head of the a cavalry horse platoon of the 4th Hussar, and was wounded on June 5, at Picardie and was evacuated towards Paris. At the end of June 1940, he pursued the campaign at the head of a cyclist platoon. Assigned to North Africa in October with his unit, he was transferred to the 2nd Dragoon Regiment at the dissolution of the 4th Hussar Regiment on September 1.

Assigned to the 1st Foreign Cavalry Regiment 1^{er} REC in Morocco in November 1940. He participated to the campaign of Tunisia from December 1942 to March 1943. He went back to Morocco, where he was promoted to captain on June 25, 1943.

=== The 2nd Armored Division and the campaign of France (1944-1945) ===
Assigned to the general staff headquarters of général Leclerc, at the 2nd Armored Division 2^{e} DB, in January 1944, disembarked at Grandcamp-Maisy on July 28, 1944, he participated to the Battle of Normandy and the Liberation of Paris. In November 1944, he assumed command of a tank squadron of the 12th Cuirassier Regiment. His tanks were the first to enter in Strasbourg and combat engaged in front of Kehl on November 23, 1944. Wounded in Alsace in January 1945, convalescent, he reassumed command of the 3rd tank combat company of the 501^{e} Régiment de chars de combat (501^{e} R.C.C) on April 23, 1945, with whom he finished off the war while delivering, on May 4, 1945, the last combat of the 2nd Armored Division at Inzel in front of Berchtesgaden.

=== Indochina (1945-1946) ===
Volunteer for the Fast East (French: l'Extrême-Orient), he disembarked at Saigon on October 19, 1945, with the marching group of the 2nd Armored Division, which on February 15, 1946, he received the command of one of the three tactical autonomous under groups. During the disembarking at Haiphong, he was wounded by the Chinese bullets. At the head of his armored units, he was the first to reach Langson at the Chinese frontier in July 1946.

=== 1946 - 1965 ===
Repatriated in metropolis in October 1946, he was designated to follow a basic airborne course at Fort Benning in the United States (U.S.) in January 1948. Assigned to the general staff headquarters of the inspection of airborne forces then to the permanent committee of the Atlantic Pact at London to start from November 1, 1948, to 1953. He was promoted to the rank of Chef d'escadrons (Squadron chief) in 1951.

He followed several courses at the Superior War School from 1953 to 1955 and in parallel also, a cycle on the country in means of development at the Political Science School at Paris, and received his rank of lieutenant-colonel accordingly in 1956 while serving in the 1st Parachute Hussar Regiment 1^{er} RHP in Algeria from 1955 to 1960, a regiment which he commanded from 1958 to 1960.

He was promoted to the rank of colonel in 1959, and became an instructor at the War School from 1960 to 1962, at the Superior Inter-Arm Courses and conducted in the "three stars" (Land, Air, Sea), conferences on the art of the military on one part, on the decolonization and the various accords concluded with newly independent States in the African continent, on another.

He was designated in appointment as the military attaché of France to Washington D.C. from 1962 to 1965. He left the United States (U.S.) for a post in Germany in 1965. During his service years in France, the U.S. and Germany, he organized conferences of divers subjects, in French and in the language of these Nations, in the aim of the deepening the Foreign cultural relations.

=== The général ===
He was admitted to the 1st section of officer generals in 1966. Chief of the general staff headquarters of the général commander-in-chief of the French Forces in Germany (French: forces françaises en Allemagne) from 1966 to 1967, he returned to France to assume the functions of the assistant général of the 8th Division at Compiègne from 1967 to 1968, then command of the Second Armored Brigade (French: deuxième brigade blindée) until 1970. Assistant général of the Military governor of Paris in 1970, he received his third star in 1971 then the command of the 11th Parachute Division 11^{e} DP. From 1973 to 1976, he commanded the 3rd Military Region where he served was lifted to the rank designation of a général de corps d’armée in 1974.

He was admitted to the 2nd section of officer generals to count from October 27, 1976.

=== Civilian career and literature activities ===
Brevetted at the Superior War School (French: l’école supérieure de guerre), with a diploma from the management control institute (French: l’institut de contrôle de gestion), he became assistant in continuous formation and management from 1976 until 1981. He taught personnel of various levels in three main domains: management, accountancy and communication - social relations, personnel management and salaries. He accordingly organized a formation cycle in general culture, destined for the superior cadres and baring on the biggest problems at hand for the époque. He organized high level summits, presented them and animated their debates.

A man of words (French: Homme de lettres), « defense » correspondent at the journal Ouest-France in 1980, member of the Académie des sciences d'outre-mer, he wrote les Plages du débarquement (the disembarking beaches) in 1978 and June 6, 1944 - Débarquement en Normandie, Victoire stratégique de la guerre (Disembarking in Normandy, strategic war victory).

He was the history counselor of the telefilms D-Day in 1984 and 39-45 in 1985.

He commented on several emission episodes on channel « 5 » on the Gulf War in 1991.

In May 1994, he published a biography Général Leclerc, maréchal de France (General Leclerc, Marshal of France).

During the years 1994-1995, during the 50th anniversary of the liberation of France, he wrote several articles, pronounced speeches at conferences and participated to numerous radio diffused and televised emissions relative to the Battle of Normandy and the Liberation of Paris and Strasbourg. In 2006, he published his testimony book Ce en quoi je crois (That to what I believe in).

In addition to his literature and media activities, since his retirement, he was frequently called upon by the municipalities, the universities, schools and university colleges, to speak to the youth on the events that he witnessed and described in his numerous articles, revues and journals (Revue historique des armées, Ouest-France, Le Soir, Le Spectacle du Monde, etc.). He commented on expositions on the war and the French Resistance based on the demand of History Professors. He accompanied and animated visits on the fields of battle and the beaches of Normandy.

=== Associations ===
Member of several associations out of which: the Riders Gentlemen Club, member of the committee director of the Association of Combatant Writers (French: association des écrivains combattants) and of his Jury which attributes literature prizes, he composed a number of « Notes de lecture » and participated to the selection of prizes, novels, essays and history. He is the founder and President of the National Union of the Armored Arm - cavalry - tanks - from 1979 to 1986, then, Honorary President. He was called upon to preside over the French Foreign Legion Veteran Societies Federation (Légion étrangère) (FSALE) from 1980 to 1992, for which he became both the Honorary President as well as President of the Honorary Hereditary Association; he is a member of the charter committee of the French Association for the Atlantic Community, the association of defense journalists and the association of Catholic writers, he is also a member of the Académie des sciences d'outre-mer.

== Recognitions and honors ==

Titled of 11 citations for war accomplishments out of which 6 are the orders of the army.

- Grand-croix Order of the Légion d’honneur
- Grand-croix of the National Order of Merit
- Croix de guerre 1939-1945
- Croix de guerre des Théâtres d'opérations extérieures
- Croix de la Valeur militaire
- Knight of the Ordre des Palmes Académiques
- Officer of the Order of Agricultural Merit
- Aeronautical Medal
- Legion of Merit (U.S. American decoration)

== See also ==
- 503^{e} Régiment de chars de combat
- 501^{e}-503^{e} Régiment de chars de combat
