= Institution des Invalides de la Legion Etrangere =

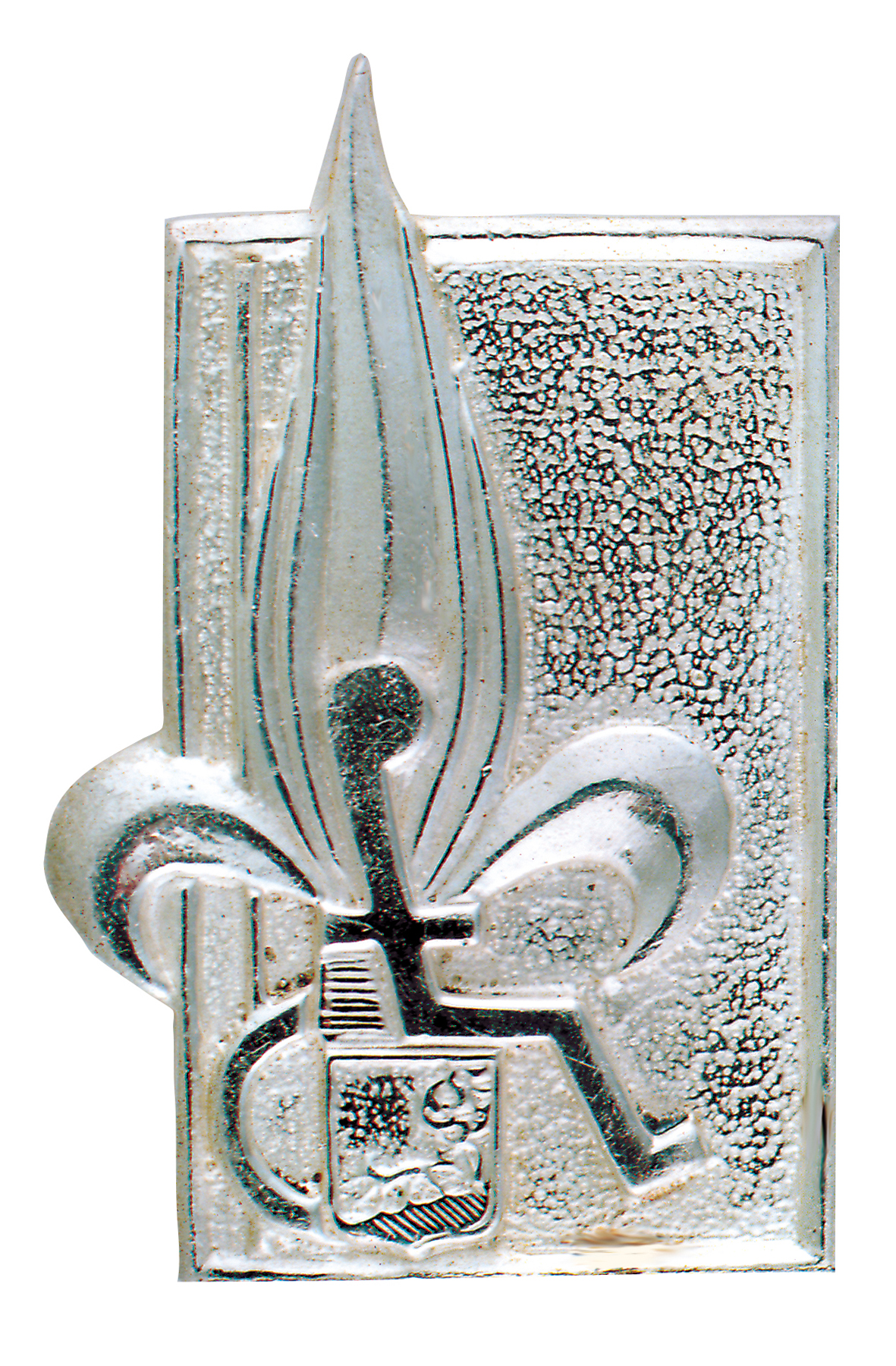
- IILE Unit Badge
- Country: France
- Branch: French Army
- Headquarters: Puyloubier, Bouches-du-Rhône, France
- Website: IILE official website

Insignia
- Abbreviation: IILE

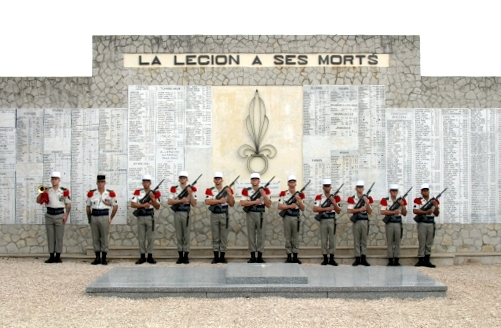

Institution des Invalides de la Legion Etrangere (French: Institution des invalides de la Légion étrangère) is one of various detachments reserved exclusively for personnel having served in the Foreign Legion and for the most part, is also serviced by veteran legionnaires. The detachment's main activity is focused on housing and caring for over a hundred veteran legionnaires, which include wounded legionnaires, retired legionnaires and the elder legionnaires. Amongst the detachment's various functions, the primary mission revolves around being exclusively dedicated, specially to comfort the senior wounded veterans of the Legion which are housed in this institution. The domain is 240 hectares situated on the slope of the Montagne Sainte-Victoire in the south of France on the commune of Puyloubier. The institute is dependent on the Foyer d'entreaide de la étrangère, a public administration established in 2014.

== Institution des Invalides de la Legion Etrangere ==
=== History of the institution ===
Since the beginning, the Commandement de la Légion étrangère has always been preoccupied with the sort of difficulties facing wounded veterans legionnaires and the sick, including those who also retired, who had to leave their adopted nation. Accordingly, building for them a home which belonged to them and where they would grow old and continue to live, in Honneur et Fidélité was a pillar duty.

=== History of the domain ===
This vast domain is first a Gallo-Roman villa, as attested by the aqueduct which supplies water from the mountain of Sainte-Victoire, whose natural mainstream is still visible.

It is also a bastide of the 10th and 12th century whose entourage still serve the castle, which was reconstructed in the 19th century.

As soon as they returned, the legionnaires started the general works around the domain to restore, build and plant the natural surroundings. Installations had to be amended in order to create a vast centre of adaptation revolving around military fraternity. All legionnaires present at the time, even those who came back wounded from far-distant campaigns, activated themselves to put this domain together. These heroes, "in a forced resting phase", built their domain and the functionality of the current detachment. The legion at this time époque and according to Chef de bataillon (Commandant -Major) Le Roch, the first Director of the I.I.L.E: "It is first about combat, then work, and at the end, it's about fraternity and camaraderie".

The domain houses a dozen hectares of Vineyard which has produced award-winning wines, less than a thousand feet of olive trees, and wheat fields. The domain also houses numerous animals and natural colorful elements. In this domain, the shepherd can be Russian, the cordonnier can be German, the mason can be Spanish, and his best friend can be Swiss.

There are a series of programmes which include reaping, outdoor activities, and design workshops. Other programs include rehabilitation and reeducation programmes which assist in preparing the return to a normal life. Due to the generosity of the friends of the Foreign Legion and all Legion officers, sous-officiers, and legionnaires, a vast hemicycle structure was built, capable of housing all the needy veterans of the French Foreign Legion.

Built since 1953 and inaugurated on May 15, 1955, by général Kœnig, this centre followed the Moral Service of the Legion (French: Service Moral de la Légion) which was attached in part to the corps of the garrisons, in charge of welcoming conversions of the legionnaires that were wounded or sick and also is in charge of reforming soldiers to be able to adapt to normal life and surroundings.

This centre, equally designated as Domain Captain Danjou (the officer who commanded a legion detachment which illustrated capability at Camarón) is financed by the different legion units.

The domain also houses as well the Legionnaire Uniform Museum.

== Carré Legion ==
In addition, the communal cemetery of Puyloubier houses the Carré Legion (French: Carré Legion) where numerous Legion figures and veteran legionnaires are interred. Some were buried in former Carré Legion and were brought back with the Legion, some are in common crypts, and others are in tombs. Amongst them feature:

- Général Paul-Frédéric Rollet
- 1^{re} Classe Zimmermann
- Lieutenant-colonel Count Aage of Rosenborg
- Général Olié
- Colonel Jeanpierre
- R.P Hirlemann
- Général Pierre Morel
- Colonel Morin, first regimental commander of the Para Legion Units
- Adjudant-Chef Struzyna
- Caporal-Chef Siegfried Freytag

== Gallery ==
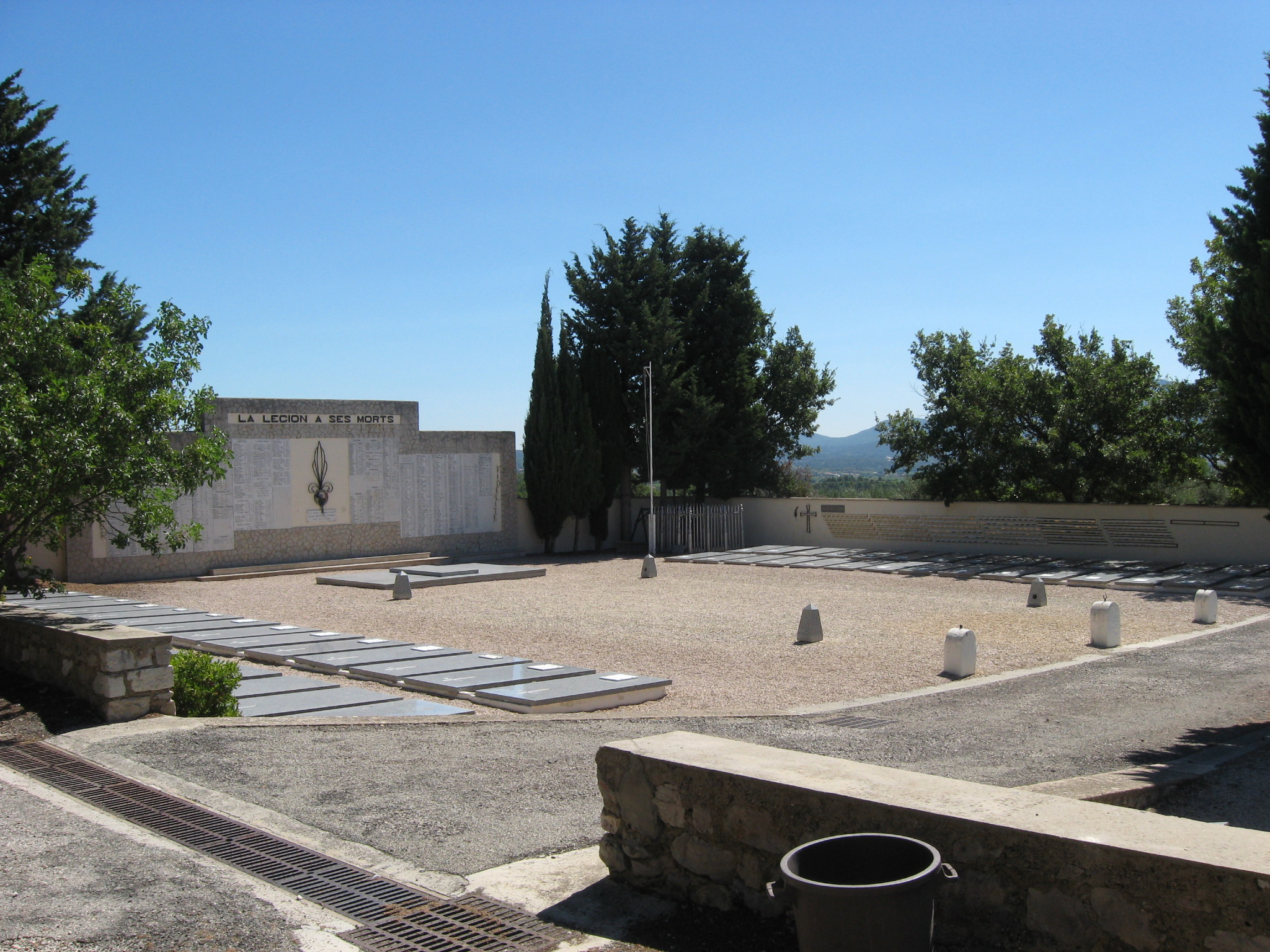

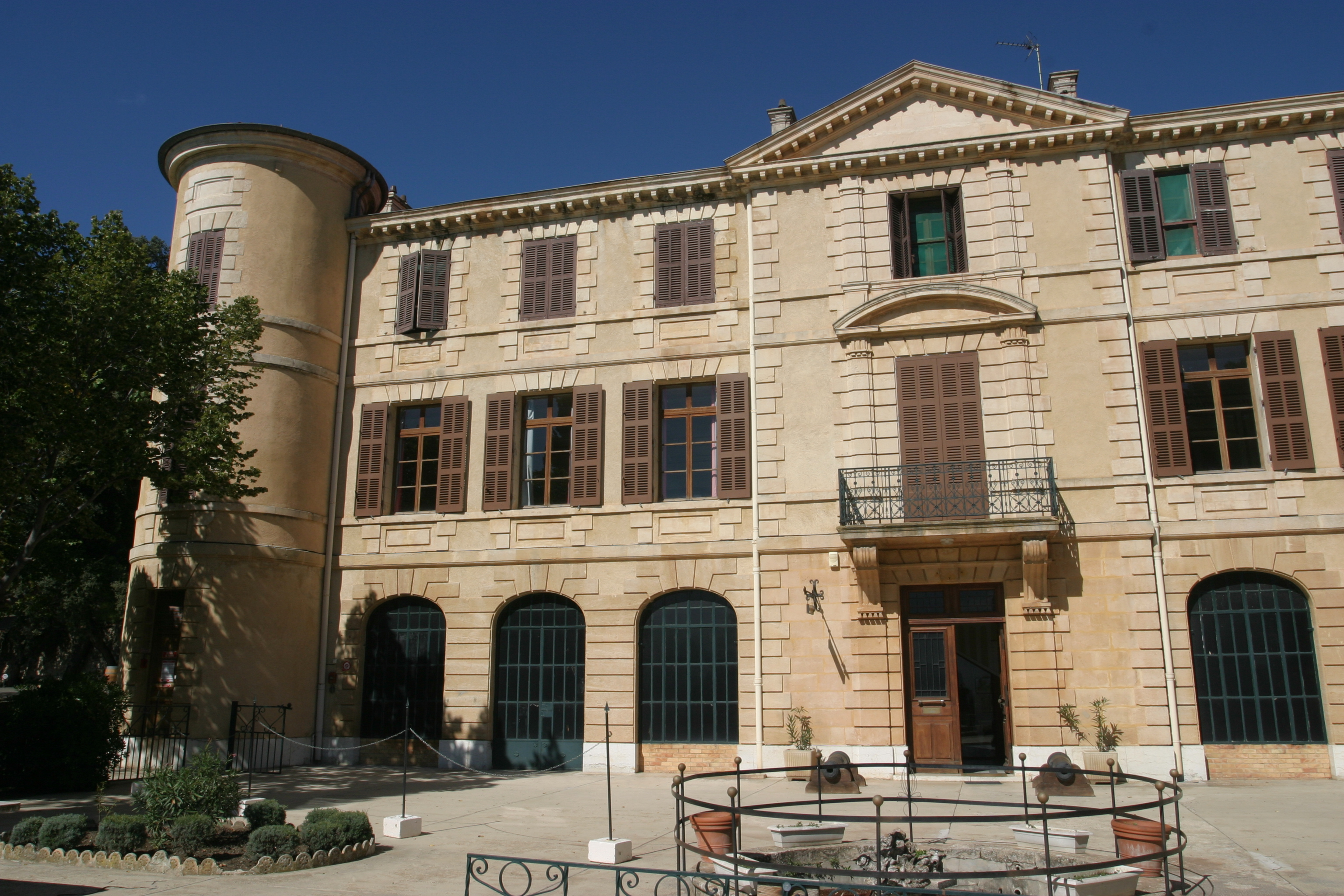

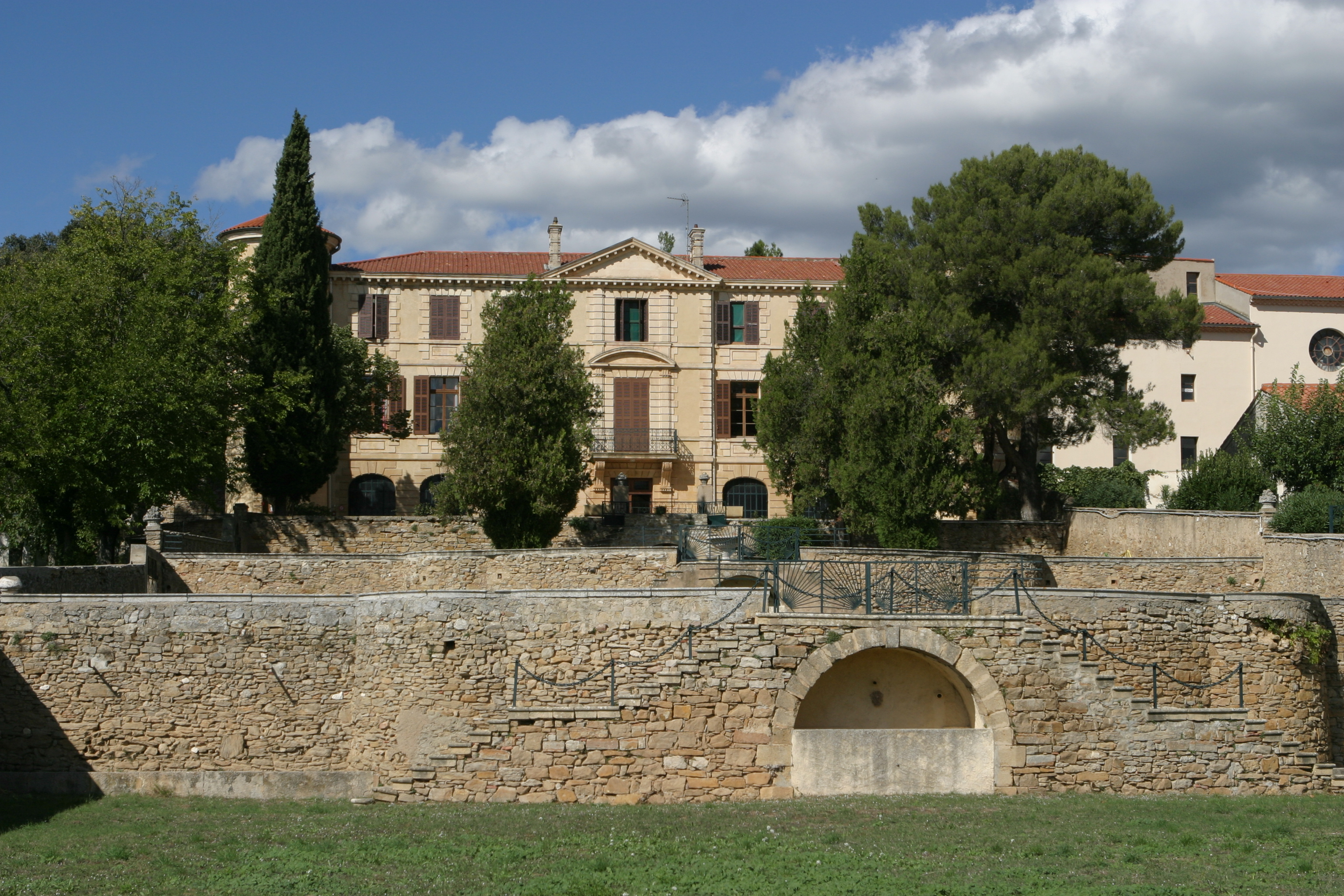

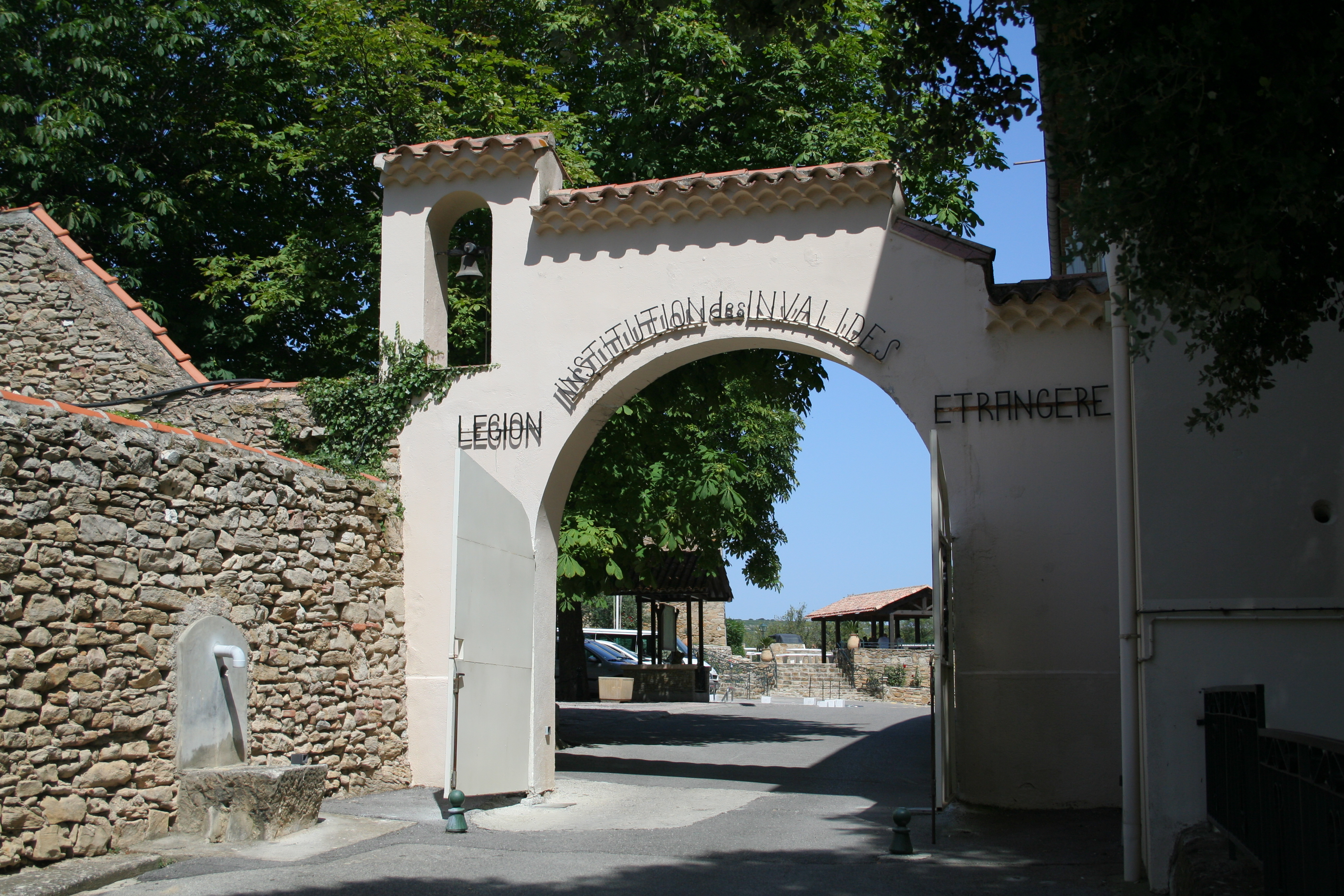

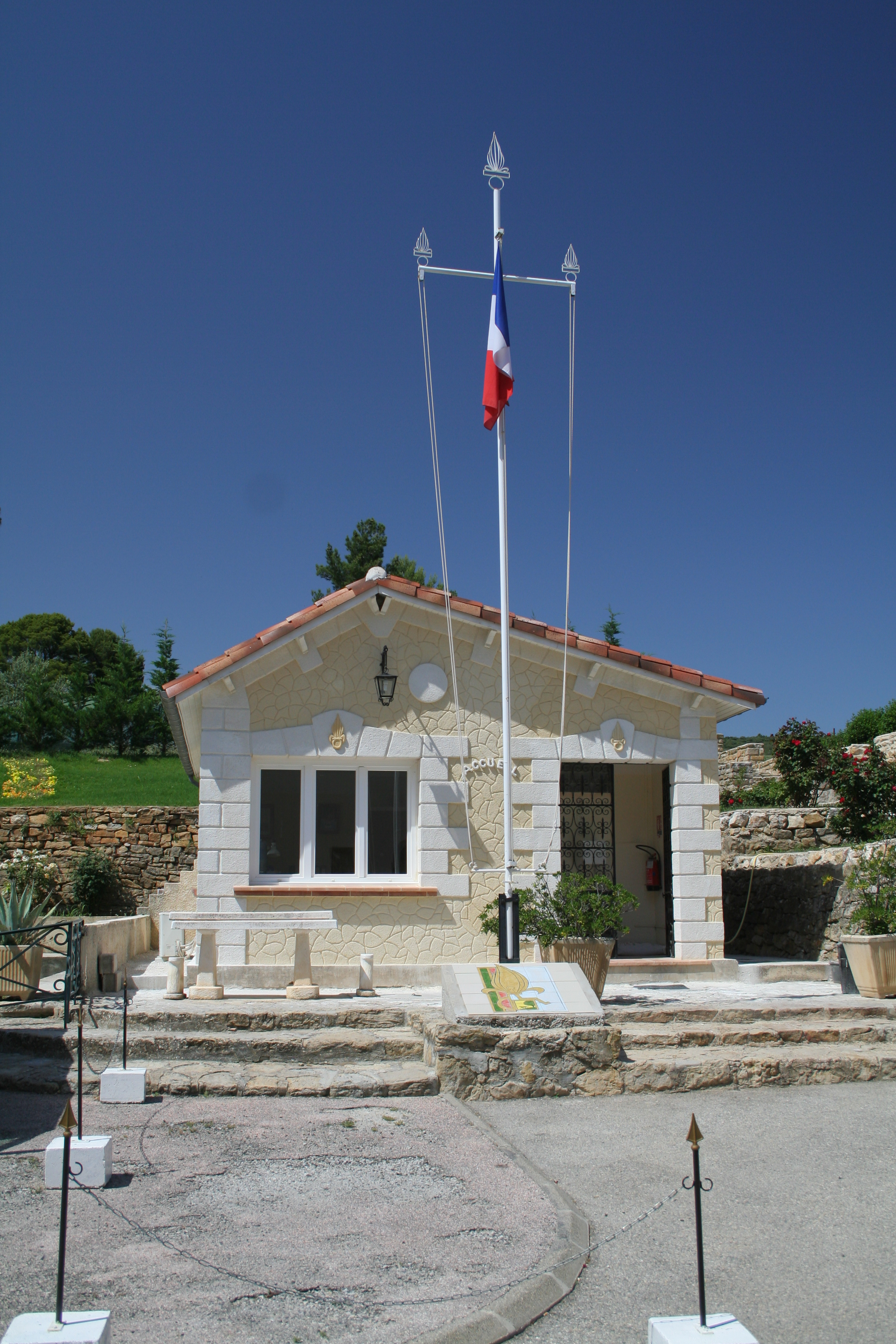

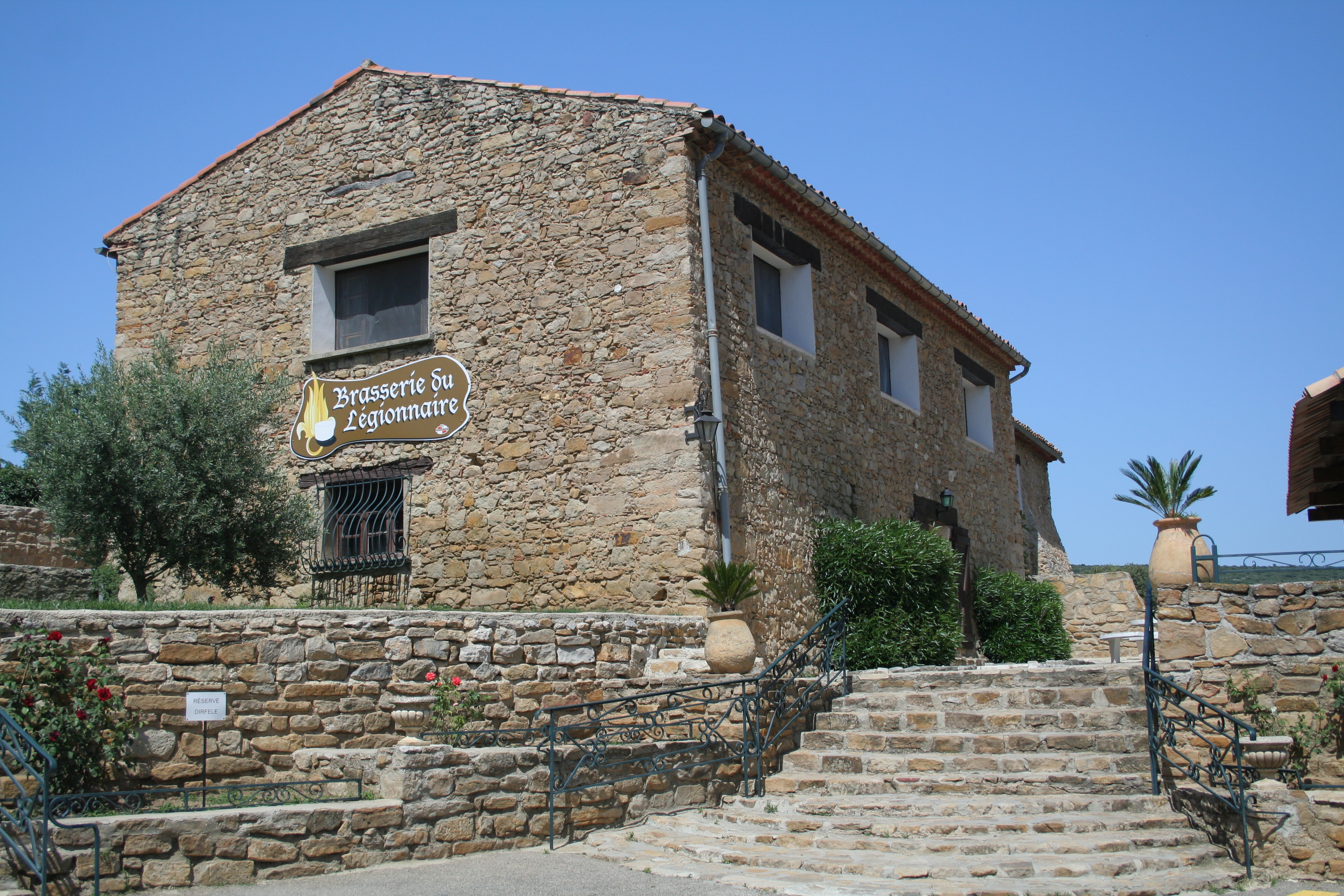

== See also ==
- Major (France)
- French Foreign Legion Music Band (MLE)
- Royal Hospital Chelsea
