= Paul-Frédéric Rollet =

French Army general (1875–1941)

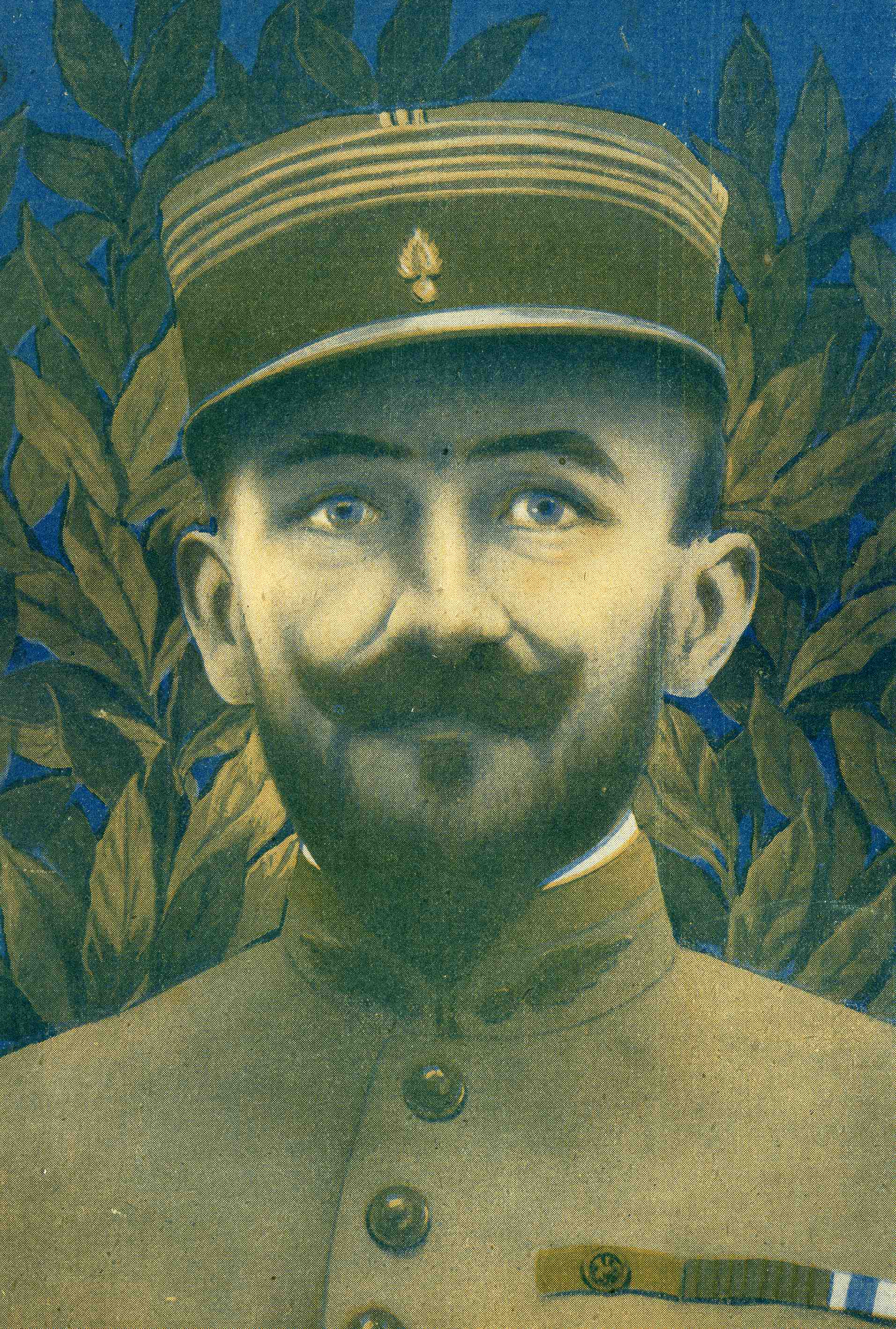
- Born: 20 December 1875; Auxerre, France
- Died: 16 April 1941 (aged 65); Paris, France
- Burial place: Aubagne, France
- Military career
- Allegiance: France
- Service: French Army
- Service years: 1894–1935
- Rank: Général
- Nickname: Le Père Légion (Father of the Legion)
- Commands: Marching Regiment of the Foreign Legion; 3rd Foreign Infantry Regiment; 1st Foreign Regiment; Inspector-General of the Foreign Legion
- Conflicts: World War I
- Awards: Légion d'honneur Croix de guerre
- Other work: Fédération des sociétés d'anciens de la Légion étrangère, FSALE

Paul-Frédéric Rollet (1875–1941) was a French Army Général who led in the Marching Regiment of the Foreign Legion RMLE, and was the 1st Inspector of the Foreign Legion, a post which he created under his intentions. Rollet accumulated 41 years of military service out of which 33 were in the Legion and also planned the 100th anniversary of the legion on Camerone day of 30 April 1931. He was responsible for creating many of the Legion's current traditions.

== Early life ==
He was born in Auxerre, France and was admitted to the military school at Saint-Cyr in 1894. Upon graduation, he was initially assigned to the 91st Infantry Regiment (French: 91e régiment d'infanterie) but was later transferred to the 1st Foreign Regiment 1^{er} RE in Sidi-bel-Abbes, Algeria.

== Military career ==
Rollet served first in Algeria from 1899 to 1902, then in Madagascar from 1902 to 1905, prior to returning to Algeria from 1905 to 1909. Promoted to captain in March 1909, he commanded the 3rd mounted combat company of the 1st marching battalion of the 2nd Foreign Regiment, 2^{e} R.E from 1909 to 1914.

While World War I erupted, Rollet was on leave in France. Insisting to be on the front, he was assigned to the 31st Line Infantry Regiment (French: 31st Line Infantry Regiment), then to the 331 Infantry Regiment (French: 331st Infantry Regiment). Wounded twice, he was promoted by delegation to Chef de bataillon (Commandant – Major), based on the recommendation of général Henri Joseph Eugène Gouraud. Following several victories, he was confirmed as a Chef de battalion.

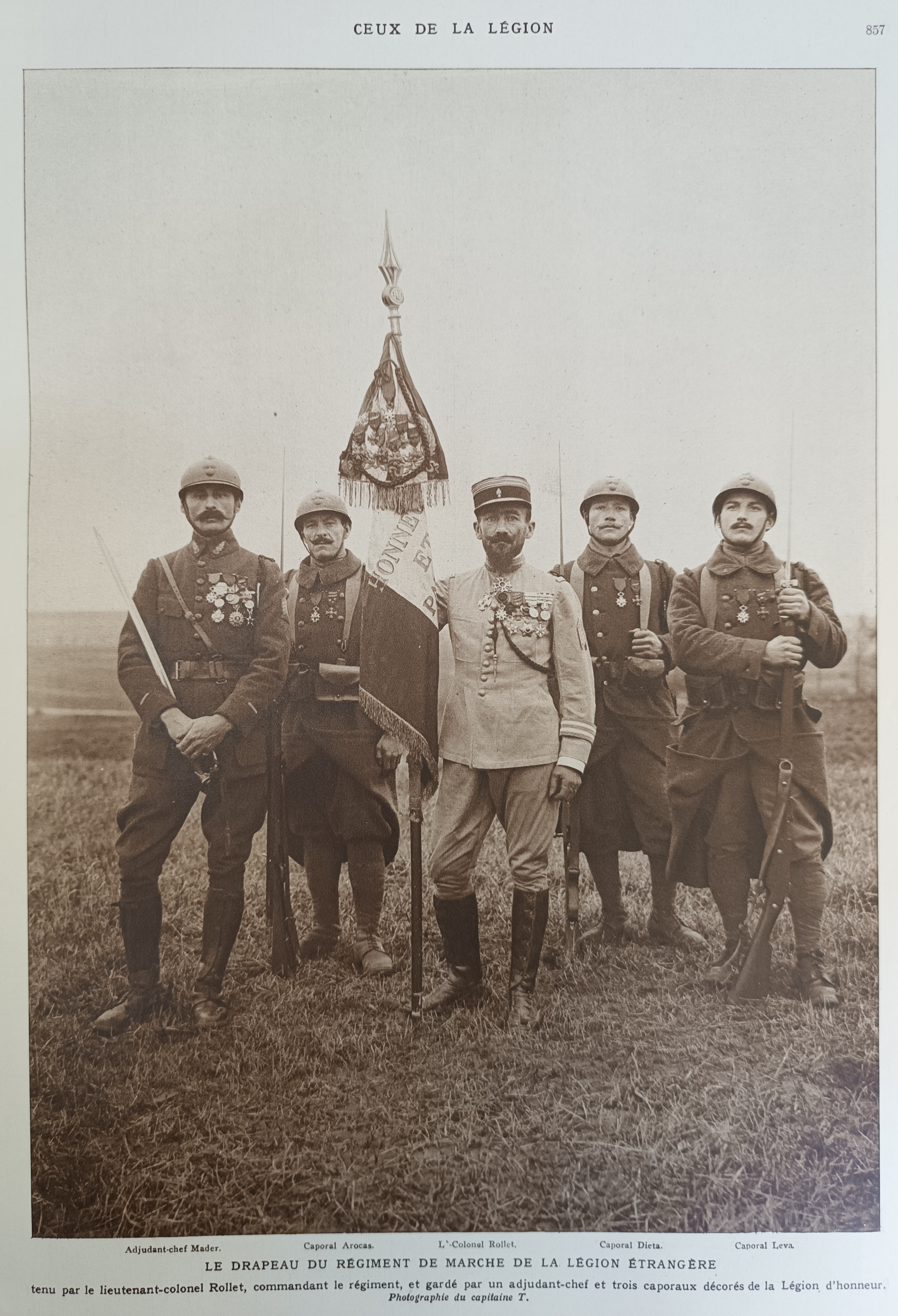
Flag of the Foreign Legion Marching Regiment (RMLE) in 1917, held by Rollet. (On the far left is Max Mader).

On 18 May 1917 he was assigned to the Foreign Legion and became the regimental commander of the Marching Regiment of the Foreign Legion (R.M.L.E) as a lieutenant-colonel. Under his command, the regiment covered itself with excellence during combats of Hangard-en-Santerre, La Montagnde de Paris, then in piercing the Hindenburg Line, a combat battle which would later be designated as the anniversary of the 3rd Foreign Infantry Regiment 3^{e} REI, heir to the traditions of the R.M.L.E. The regimental colors of the R.M.L.E were subsequently decorated with four new citations (with five previous citations already) as well as the double Fourragere, with colors of the Légion d'honneur and Croix de guerre. At the end of the war of 1914–1918, he participated in campaigns in Morocco with his regiment, which would be designated as the 3rd Foreign Infantry Regiment 3^{e} REI.

Consequently, Rollet was promoted to colonel. In 1925, he assumed command as regimental commander of the 1st Foreign Regiment 1^{e} RE at Sidi-Bel-Abbès. He would remain until planning the 100th anniversary (the centennial) of the French Foreign Legion on Cameron day of 30 April 1931.

On 1 April 1931 Rollet assumed command tenure as the 1st Inspector of the Foreign Legion, a post which he specifically created under his intentions.

Following years of service, Rollet retired on 20 December 1935, having accumulated 41 years of military service out of which 33 years were in the Legion.

== Later life and death ==
In his final years of service, he dedicated his career to the organization of the modern French Foreign Legion and the realization of considerable social profits to active legionnaires as well as those on retirement. He would later pursue social donation actions in that respect after concluding his service.

Rollet died in Paris on 16 April 1941. He was originally buried at the French Foreign Legion's Headquarters in Sidi-bel-Abbes in Algeria. When the Legion left Algeria in 1962 his remains were one of three chosen to be reinterred at the Legion's new headquarters in Aubagne, France.

== Legacy ==
He is surnamed Père de la Légion (Father of the Legion), an honorary title. This title is reflected in his organization of Legion units. Rollet made major contributions to promoting and preserving the Legion's history, traditions, and mystique.

== Recognitions and honors ==
Général Rollet's awards include:

=== List of decorations ===
Orders, decorations, and medals of France

- Grand officer de la Légion d'honneur
- Croix de guerre 1914–1918 with 7 palms and gilt star
- Croix de guerre des théâtres d'opérations extérieures with 2 palms
- Médaille commémorative du Maroc with clasps : OUDJA-MAROC-HAUT-GUIR
- Médaille coloniale with 4 clasps: SAHARA-MAROC-ALGÉRIE-MADAGASCAR
- Croix du combattant
- 1914–1918 Inter-Allied Victory medal (France)
- Médaille commémorative de la guerre 1914-1918
- Chevalier de l'ordre du Mérite agricole (1911)
- Commemorative medal of the battle of Verdun (medal non-official)
- Commemorative medal of the battle of the Somme

=== Orders, decorations and Foreign medals ===
- Commander of the Order of the Crown (Romania) (1917)
- Recipient of the Spanish Red Cross of Military Merit 1920
- Commander of the Order of Prince Danilo I (Montenegro – 1917)
- Commander of the Order of Civil Merit (Spain – 1930)
- Commander of the Order of the Oak Crown (Luxembourg – 1931)
- Grand officer of the Order of Order of Ouissam Alaouite (1931)
- Grand officer of the Order of Nichan Iftikhar (1931)
- Grand officer of the Order of Saint-Charles (Principality of Monaco 1931)
- Grand-cross of the Royal Order of Cambodia 14 November 1936
- Grand Cross of Military Merit with red decoration (Spain – 1925)
- Officier de l'Ordre chérifien du Ouissan hafidien (1911)
- Royal Order of Monisaraphon, (1936)

== See also ==
- Major (France)
- French Foreign Legion Music Band (MLE)
- Moroccan Division
- 1st Foreign Infantry Regiment
- 2nd Foreign Infantry Regiment
- 3rd Foreign Infantry Regiment
- History of the 2nd Foreign Regiment
- List of French Foreign Legion units
