= Madder (disambiguation) =

Madder is the common name for Rubia, a genus of flowering plants in the family Rubiaceae.

Madder may also refer to:

== People ==
- Leo Madder (born 1946), Belgian television actor

== Places ==
- Madder Cliffs, Antarctica

== Music ==
- Madder Mortem, Norwegian progressive metal band
- Madder Lake, Australian progressive rock band
- Madder Rose, New York City-based alternative rock band

== Other ==
- Even Madder Aunt Maud, character in Philip Ardagh's books 'The Eddie Dickens Trilogy'
- Rose madder, red dye or paint made from the pigment Madder Lake, traditionally extracted from the crushed root of Rubia tinctorum

== See also ==
- Maddur (disambiguation)
- Mader (disambiguation)
