= Max-Emmanuel Mader =

German-born soldier (1880–1950s)

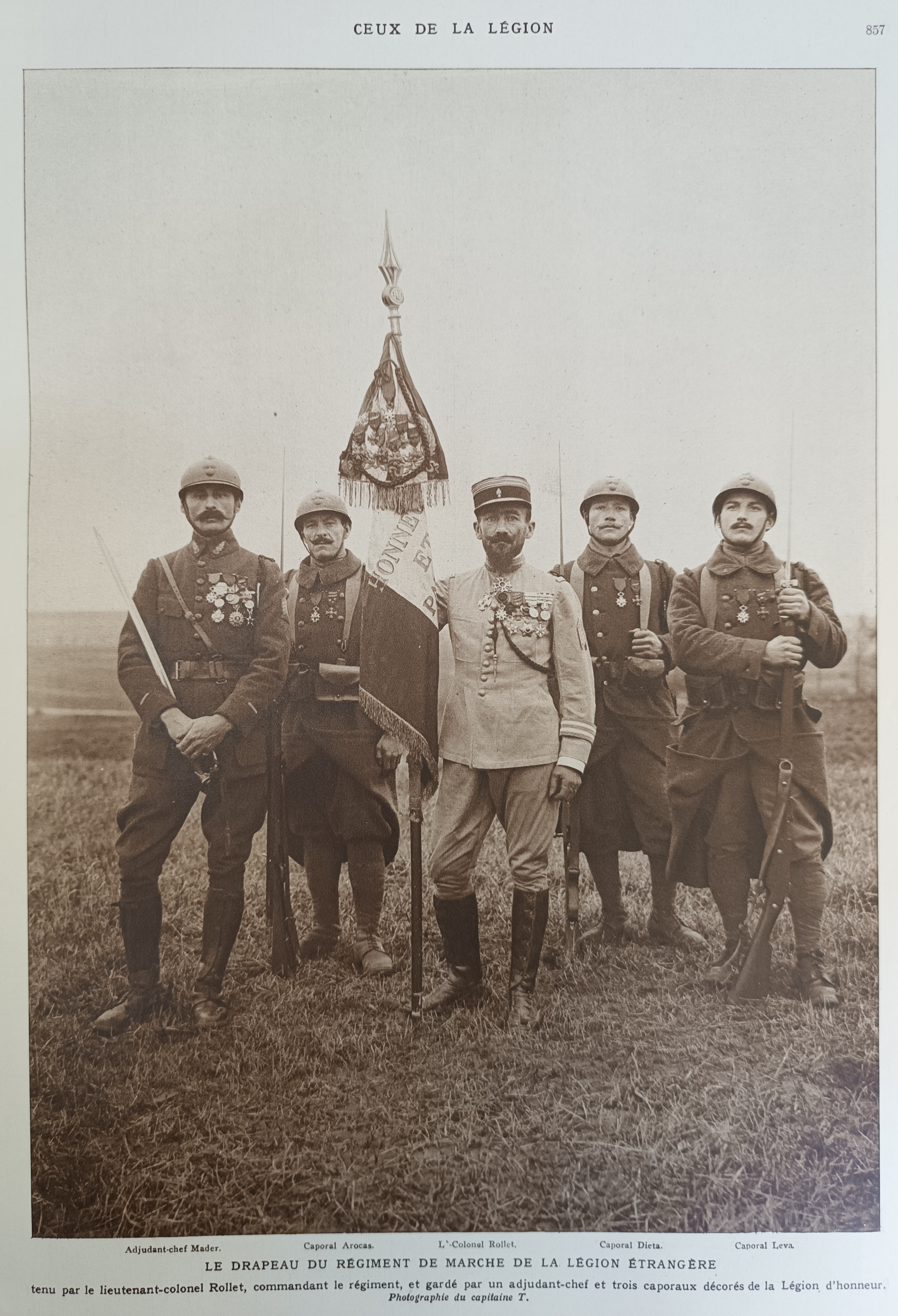
Adjutant-Chef Mader (far left) with the flag of his regiment, 1917. At centre is the commanding officer, Lieutenant-Colonel Paul-Frédéric Rollet

Max-Emmanuel Mader (18 January 1880 – 1950s) was a German-born soldier of the French Foreign Legion. He was conscripted into the Imperial German Army but deserted after striking his sergeant. Mader fled to Switzerland and then to France where he joined the Foreign Legion. He served in French North Africa until Germany invaded France at the start of the First World War. Although he was not compelled to fight against Germany, Mader volunteered for service on the Western Front to fight his former countrymen. Mader became the most decorated non-commissioned officer in the legion for his actions during the war and received the Médaille militaire and the Croix de Guerre, and was appointed a knight of the Legion of Honour. He lost his right arm during the Second Battle of the Marne and after the war became a warden at the Palace of Versailles.

== Early life ==
Mader was born on 18 January 1880 in Giengen in the Kingdom of Württemberg within the German Empire. He worked as a stonemason before he was conscripted into a pioneer regiment of the Imperial German Army at the age of 18. Mader deserted the army after striking a sergeant who had victimised him and fled to Switzerland. Mader thought he had killed the sergeant, though it has never been proved.

In Switzerland he met a veteran of the French Foreign Legion who recommended that he enlist; he joined the 2nd Foreign Infantry Regiment at Montbeliard in December 1899, stating his nationality to be Swiss. Mader served with the legion in French North Africa, including Saïda and southern Oran in Algeria, where he used his masonry skills to help construct forts. He re-enlisted in the Legion in 1904 and 1909. On 21 November 1910, when he was a corporal, he was granted French citizenship, the notification in the Journal officiel de la République française listed his true birthplace. Mader served with his regiment's 22nd Mounted Company in the Chaouia region of Morocco between 1910 and 1911 and joined the 3rd Mounted Company in July 1913.

== First World War ==
Germany declared war on France in August 1914, as part of the First World War. France did not expect legionnaires that had been born in Germany or German ally Austria, to fight against their birth country. Some 12% of the strength of the legion came under this category and many served out the war on garrison duty in French North Africa. Mader, who was by this time a sergeant with the legion in Morocco, volunteered to fight on the Western Front against Germany.

In April 1917 Mader, by this time an adjutant-chef (warrant officer), fought in the Battle of the Hills, part of the Nivelle offensive. He led the 6th Company of the Marching Regiment of the Foreign Legion to capture a battery of seven German artillery pieces near Moronvilliers. On 18 May 1917 he was appointed a knight of the Legion of Honour. In July 1918, during the Second Battle of the Marne while fighting near Villers-Cotterêts Mader was severely wounded, losing his right arm and shoulder to a shell explosion. He was carried to the base hospital but was not expected to survive. He regained consciousness as the last rites were being administered and went on to make a recovery. During the war Mader received an officer's commission as second lieutenant and was awarded the Médaille militaire and the Croix de Guerre with palms and stars. He was the most decorated non-commissioned officer of the Legion during the war.

== Later life ==
Mader left the French Foreign Legion in 1919 and was afterwards appointed a warden at the Palace of Versailles. Following the occupation of France by Germany in 1940 Mader adopted a false name and pretended to be deaf and mute so that German troops would not spot him by his accented French. Mader died of natural causes in the 1950s.
