= Xavier Mader =

French wallpaper designer

Xavier Mader (1789–1830) was a French wallpaper designer. Mader designed numerous scenic wallpapers for Joseph Dufour et Cie, a French wallpaper manufacturer. For Dufour's 1812 Les Monuments de Paris wallpaper, Mader worked with a team of 250 artisans to create the piece.

His work is included in the collection of the RISD museum, the Musée de Valence, France, and the Cooper Hewitt, Smithsonian Design Museum.

== Scenic wallpapers ==
- L’Histoire de Psyché 1815 (Dufour)
- La Galérie Mythologique (Dufour)
- Les Monuments de Paris 1812 (Dufour)
