= Mager =

Mager is a surname. People with the surname include:

- Georges Mager (1885–1950), French trumpeter
- Gianluca Mager (born 1994), Italian tennis player
- Jörg Mager (1880-1939), German musician and electronic music pioneer
- Karl Mager (1810–1858), German educator
- Manuela Mager (born 1962), German figure skater
- NB Mager, writer and director of the 2026 film Run Amok
