= Inspection of the Foreign Legion =

Particularly following World War I, the Foreign Legion grew exponentially reputable and became important part in the French Army. Accordingly, new regiments were formed, one of which was the 1st Foreign Cavalry Regiment 1^{er} REC.

During the interwar period and in 1930, following the creation of the 5th Foreign Infantry Regiment 5^{e} REI in Tonkin, the Legion stood strong at 30,000 Legionnaires. Accordingly, the need to organize the Legion was necessary and also the need to provide a clear structure of command that would safe keep the evolution of the legion in relation to the foreign service of its volunteers proved to be even more important. On March 2, 1931, the general staff headquarters of the Armies, a Général, signed the instruction of two formulations, which rather initial, would be the main founding legislative pillar acts of the Inspection of the Foreign Legion.

This reorganization has been mainly and for a while preoccupied by the intentions of the Colonel Paul-Frédéric Rollet while commanding the 1st Foreign Regiment 1^{er} RE. Since 1928, Marshal of France Louis Franchet d'Espèrey exposed in reports arguments in favor of a new organization of the legion in reason of the increase of general enlistments and the existence of combat regiments mainly depending on two different arms, the infantry and armoured cavalry.

The date of creation of the Inspection of the Foreign Legion was fixed on April 1, 1931. The inspection would be entrusted to a Général (or really exceptional Colonel), particularly specialized in Legion affairs.

On March 26, 1931, Colonel Rollet passed command of the 1st Foreign Regiment 1^{er} to Colonel Nicolas. On April 1, 1931, Rollet was promoted to Général de brigade and assumed the function of the Général Inspector of the Foreign Legion. Until his retirement in 1935, Rollet would serve his tailored function in total submission while comforting the culture of the Legion and codifying the essence of traditions. The inspection would be dissolved when Général Rollet would leave active duty. In 1948, the Inspection would have been seen activated for 2 years under the command of Raoul Magrin-Vernerey. Dissolved again in 1950, the inspection reappeared as Autonomous Group of the Foreign Legion (G.A.L.E) commanded successively by generals Jean Olié and Paul Gardy whom were designated as général inspector. The Autonomous Group of the Foreign Legion (G.A.L.E) compromised then, 1 Headquarters Staff in Sidi bel-Abbès, the Communal Depot of the Foreign Regiments, the 1st Foreign Infantry Regiment 1^{er} REI which regrouped all training/instruction units and the moral service for works of the Foreign Legion (S.O.M.L.E).

The inspection of the Foreign Legion would give later form to the Foreign Legion Command.

== See also ==
- Major (France)
