= Bob Mader =

American photographer (1943–2005)

- Born: January 3, 1943; Chicago, Illinois
- Died: November 4, 2005 (aged 62)
- Occupation: Photographer

Robert Darryl "Bob" Mader (January 3, 1943 – November 4, 2005) was an American photographer. James Yood of the Art Institute of Chicago said that Mader would be "remembered and prized as a major portraitist of the late 20th century"

== Photography career ==
Mader's professional career began in 1962. While he was a student at Wheaton College, Illinois, the school hired him to document a University of Chicago archaeological dig in Jordan. In 1967, he worked in Mexico City as a freelance photographer and journalist. A journey to a remote town in Mexico called Tlacotepec propelled him to return to photography. In the following years, he worked on a street photography project and documented the "Detroit Annie" bus trip from Chicago to California. His photography for Earth magazine included coverage of the bands at Fillmore in San Francisco and photographs of Bill Graham. In 1969, he became a photographer for the University of Illinois Circle Campus.

In 1971, he studied film at the Art Institute of Chicago and his Masters in Photography at the Institute of Design in Chicago. The program, the legacy of emigre artists such as László Moholy-Nagy, was considered the "New Bauhaus". In 1975, he studied at the Harry Ransom Center in Austin, Texas and spent time with E.O. Goldbeck, the father of circuit camera photography (panoramic imaging). In 1978, he taught in the University of Texas at Dallas photography program. He opened his commercial studio and embarked on the portrait photography career for which he ultimately became known. He particularly established a reputation for taking his subjects out of the studio into unusual locations which reflected their individual character or story.

In the 1980s, Mader developed a reputation for what he called "Femme Vitale" which won him an appearance on the Phil Donahue Show. "It predated the whole glamour shot movement," according to his son.

Introduced to holography in 1970 by Dr Dan Sandin at IIT, Mader was among the first to make holographic images of families. In 1990, Frederick Quellmalz, president of The Photographic Art and Science Foundation, introduced Mader as "the greatest family photographer of this century."

During his last years, he produced a series of thoughtful landscapes. His last photograph was signed on November 2, 2005. But it wasn't until after his death that the family discovered vast archives of work from his early years: a gritty, humanist and, at times, shocking, documentary of the 1960s and 1970s.

== Techniques and equipment ==
Mader started with a Hasselblad 500CM, however in the later years he was using a motorized Hasselblad 553 ELX. He shot most of his personal images with a Hasselblad 503CW with a 'pistol' style grip/motor. He only used a digital back on his Hasselblad but after doing side-by-side tests with a Digital Back vs. Film, found film to be superior in terms of quality and shooting speed.

His favorite lens was the 120mm Macro; he felt it was sharpest. He favoured the Gitzo tripod, extremely heavy and rugged. He used Dyna-Lite studio equipment and Plume and Chimera softboxes. He was very particular about the quality of light put on his clients.

Mader used between three and five Profoto strobe lights, overpowering sunlight and shooting at 500/th of a second at f/22.

== Personal life ==
While at New York University in 1964 studying playwriting with Edward Albee, he worked as a social worker with Young Life in Harlem, as a bodyguard with Kareem Abdul-Jabbar, and bartended Andy Warhol parties.

Mader married in 1965. In 1966, he taught second grade in Chicago and studied Hebrew poetry and Phoenician art at the New York Union Theological Seminary. 1967 took him to Guatemala and later to Mexico City. Back in Chicago in 1968, he worked as a cab driver. In 1970, he joined the forerunner of Stuart Gordon's Organic Theater Company and performed in the Game Show with Joe Mantegna.

In 1970, Mader's first child was born and, after the birth of his second in 1974, Mader was invited on Good Morning America to discuss what he considered to be "the most holy experiences of his life," the homebirths of his children. In 1976, he and his wife Judith founded the Children's Center Chicago, where activities included dance, theatre and photography. Their third child was born in 1976 and their fourth in 1978 – all at home.

In 2000, Mader became Scuba certified, but in 2001 he coughed up blood during the Alcatraz swim. He was diagnosed with bronchioloalveolar carcinoma and his right lung was removed.

== Notable portraits ==
- George H. W. Bush, US President
- George McGovern, Senator
- Tina Turner, singer
- Luciano Pavarotti, opera singer
- Patrick Duffy, actor who played Bobby Ewing on Dallas
- Stephanie Seymour, model
- Muhammad Ali, boxer
- Jimmy Dean, country music singer and actor turned businessman
- Roger Staubach, Dallas Cowboys quarterback
- Tom Landry, Dallas Cowboys coach
- Henry Wade, Dallas County District Attorney
- Michael Dell
- Fleetwood Mac
- The Agnich Family
