= Communal Depot of the Foreign Regiments =

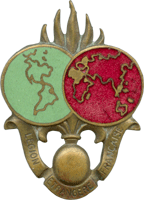
- Common Depot
- Active: 1933–1955; 1955 – 1st Foreign Regiment
- Disbanded: 1 July 1955; 70 years ago
- Country: France
- Branch: (France) French Army
- Type: Military Training
- Garrison/HQ: Sidi-bel-Abbes, Algeria

The Communal Depot of the Foreign Regiments (DCRE), (French: Dépôt commun des régiments étrangers, DCRE), was the primary training formation of the Foreign Legion from 1933 to 1955.

== History ==
The Communal Depot of the Foreign Regiments (DCRE) (French: Dépôt commun des régiments étrangers, DCRE) was created on 13 October 1933. The DCRE included a staff, a training battalion, a transit battalion, and depots in Toul, Marseille, Oran, and Arzew. The Depot was administratively dependent on the 1st Foreign Infantry Regiment.

From 1 April 1942, the DCRE became a formed unit corps (the equivalent of a regiment) and was commanded by a senior colonel: the highest-ranked colonel amongst all Foreign Legion regimental commanders. This senior colonel of the DCRE acted as a general inspector vis-à-vis of the minister.

On 1 September 1950, the functions of the DCRE were delegated to the Autonomous Group of the Foreign Legion (GALE) (French: Groupement autonome de la Légion étrangère, GALE) which took over temporarily from the Inspection of the Foreign Legion (ILE) (French: Inspection de la légion étrangère, ILE), which would later constitute the Foreign Legion Command. The DCRE in the meantime changed its name to the Communal Depot of the Foreign Legion (DCLE) (French: Dépôt commun de la Légion étrangère, DCLE). From 1950 to 1955, it was charged with running staffing operations, administration and the affairs of combat companies in transit. The DCLE was dissolved on 1 July 1955 and its mission was taken over by the 1st Foreign Regiment.

=== Insignia ===
Two hemispheres, one red and one green, masking a grenade with seven flames placed on top of the inscription: French Foreign Legion (French: << LÉGION ÉTRANGÈRE FRANÇAISE>>), The two hemispheres represent simultaneously the location of the unit at Viénot in Sidi-bel-Abbès and the monument aux morts war memorial for which the DCRE was responsible for upkeep. The green and red colors with the grenade with seven flames are the historical marks of the Foreign Legion. The insignia was created in 1946 by Colonel Gaultier, highest Legion ranking regimental commander of the DCRE.

== Organization ==
- Headquarters Staff
- Instruction/Training Battalion
- Transit Battalion
- Four Operations Depots
  - Depot at Arzew
  - Depot at Marseille
  - Depot at Oran
  - Depot at Toul

== See also ==
- Major (France)
- French Foreign Legion Music Band (MLE)
- French Foreign Legion recruit training
