= Foreign Legion Detachment in Mayotte =

- Détachement de Légion étrangère de Mayotte
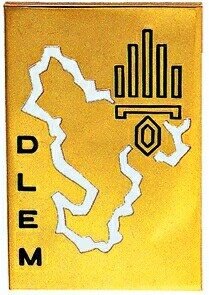
- Active: 1973 – 2024
- Country: France
- Branch: French Army
- Type: Foreign Legion
- Role: Infantry
- Garrison/HQ: Dzaoudzi, Mayotte
- Motto: Pericula ludus (To Danger My Pleasure)
- Anniversaries: Camerone Day (30 April)
- Engagements: Global war on terrorism (2001–present)
- Battle honours: Heir to the Regimental Colors of the 3rd Foreign Infantry Regiment; Regimental Colors of the 2nd Foreign Cavalry Regiment (1984 – present)

Insignia
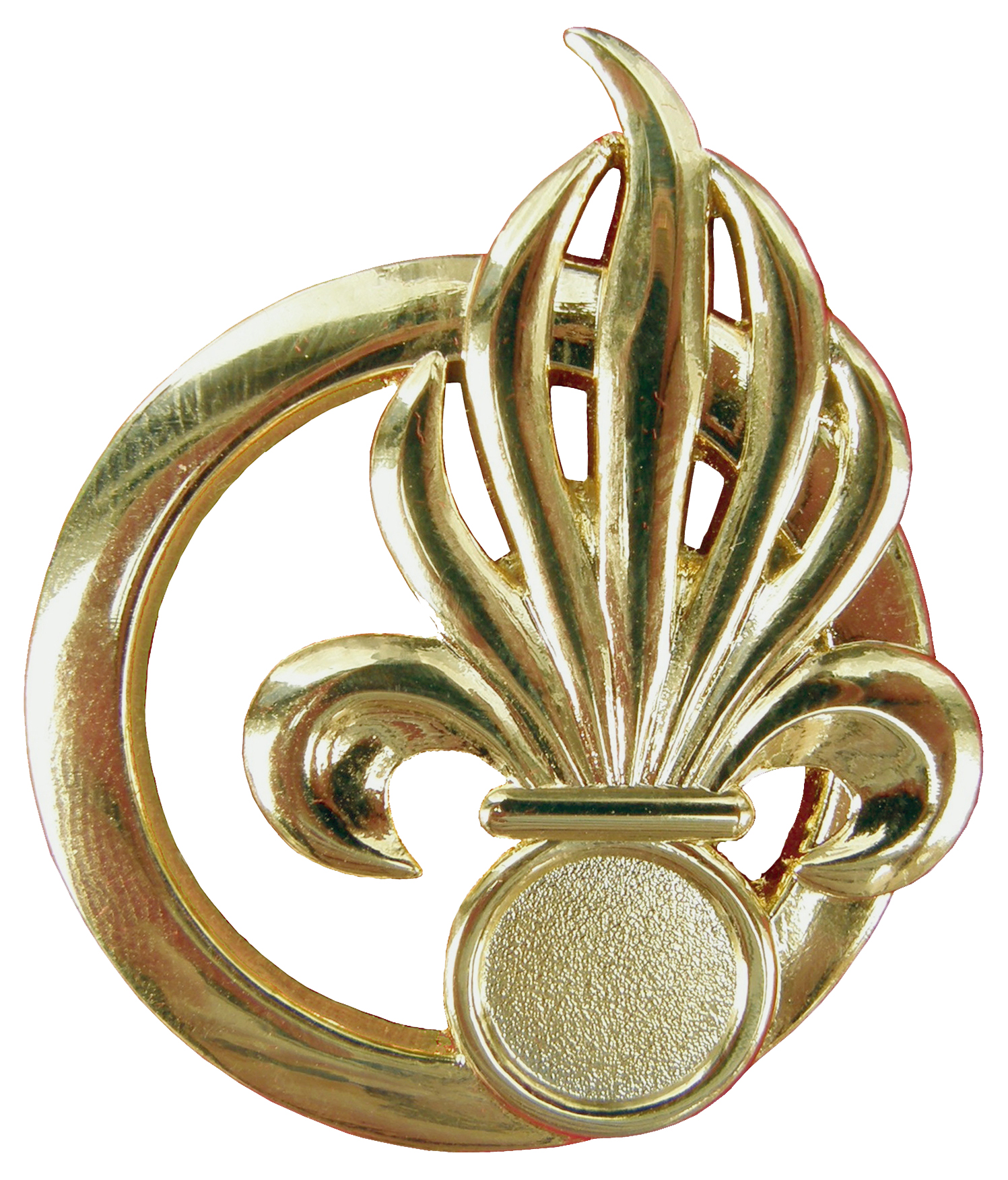
- Beret insignia of the Foreign Legion Detachment in Mayotte
- Abbreviation: DLEM

The Foreign Legion Detachment in Mayotte (French: Détachement de Légion étrangère de Mayotte, DLEM) is the former name for the detachment of the Foreign Legion based on the island of Mayotte, near Madagascar. It has been the smallest operational unit of the French Army. The main role of the detachment has been to maintain a French presence in the region, enabling the French armed forces to quickly react to events in the Indian Ocean and the east coast of Africa.

The Foreign Legion Detachment in Mayotte (DLEM) was a de facto infantry regiment of the French Army. The DLEM and all regiments of the Legion, under French command, differentiate from all armies of the world due to, that their Legion Majors, Legion Adjudant Chefs and Legion Adjudants, form both a French and non-French (Foreign) elite composition.

On June 1, 2024, the DLEM was re-designated as the reconsituted 5th Foreign Regiment (5^{e} Régiment Étranger).

== History, creation and different nominations ==
The detachment of the Foreign Legion in Mayotte (D.L.E.M) is initially heir to the 4th combat company (became in 1965 the 2nd company) of the 3rd Foreign Infantry Regiment (3^{e} R.E.I), the most decorated regimental colors in the Foreign Legion. The legion is also called Bataillon de Légion étrangère de Madagascar (BLEM).

=== Affiliation ===
In 1956, while the 3rd Foreign Infantry Regiment (3^{e} R.E.I), was engaged in combat during the Algerian War, the 3^{e} R.E.I dispatched one of its 3 battalions to constitute a marching battalion which took garrison and stationed on the « la grande île », Madagascar. This battalion was named the Foreign Legion Battalion of Madagascar, (B.L.E.M). Following the cease fire and the accords of Evian in 1962, the integrality of the 3rd Foreign Infantry Regiment 3^{e} REI leaves Algeria and regroups at Madagascar, on and around the Diégo Suarez base.

In the following years, the 4th combat company of the 3rd Foreign Infantry Regiment (then, 2nd company after being changed in 1956), periodically conducted exercise drills or nomadizations on the Comores, also was seen parading on the islands and particularly in February 1965 at Moroni in presence of the regimental commander and the music band of the 3rd Foreign Infantry Regiment. In February 1967, the 2nd company intervened in Anjouan, Moroni and Dzaoudzi, where minor troubles were produced.

=== Permanent base in the Comores and the creation of the D.L.E.C ===
In July 1967, the 2nd combat company commanded then by Captain Brissart, had set permanent garrison in the archipelago of the Comores. The 3rd section (platoon) of this company, commanded by Lieutenant Lafly, stationed at Dzaoudzi (Mayotte) while the 2nd section (platoon) commanded by Lieutenant Spillman stationed at Voivojou (7 km from Moroni on the island of Grand Comores).

In 1973, when the 3rd Foreign Infantry Regiment permanently left Madagascar to detach to French Guiana where the construction of the European Space Base of Kourou commenced, the 2nd company was placed out of ranks and maintained. A unit however forming a corps, this company on 2 August 1973 was named Foreign Legion Detachment of Comores (French: Détachement de la Légion étrangère des Comores, D.L.E.C). Accordingly, Captain François Grandjean was the first regimental commander.

=== Regrouping on Mayotte and the creation of the D.L.E.M ===
Three years later in 1976, following the referendum of independence of Comores by which the mahoraise people expressed their choice of remaining French – contrary to the 3 other islands of the Comorian archipelago – the D.L.E.C was regrouped on Mayotte and took the designation of Foreign Legion Detachment in Mayotte (D.L.E.M). Lieutenant Colonel Yves Racaud was appointed regimental commander.

Since then, the D.L.E.M maintained base at the corps of the garrison « Chef de bataillon Cabaribère », an illustrious figure of the 3rd Foreign Infantry Regiment, mortally wounded in an ambush in April 1954 at the head of his battalion, in the sector of de Ban Yan Nhan (North Vietnam). In July 1984, the D.L.E.M disposing only then a battalion fanion, receives at last an honor guard regimental color, the regimental color of the 2nd Foreign Cavalry Regiment 2^{e} REC.

=== Operation Azalée ===
On 3 October 1995; a marching company commanded by Captain Dupré composed of 80 Legionnaires of the D.L.E.M and rotating artillery of the 11th Marine Artillery Regiment, 11^{ème} RAMa, executed at 0300 in the morning an assault on the airport of Hahaya (Grand Comore), within the cadre of Operation Azalee. This armed action was followed by a tentative coup d'état led by mercenaries of Bob Denard and lasted about a week. Besides the marching company of Captain Dupré, the D.L.E.M armed an intermediary logistical platform destined to greet units and detachments of reinforcements, with less than 700 men.

=== The present D.L.E.M ===
Composed presently of 282 men, of which 162 are personnel in short duration missions, the D.L.E.M, due to a precursor system nature, has been adopted by the French Army for various formations stationed in outre mer or foreign lands and seas.

The D.L.E.M received in fact at the corps of its units in short duration since the 1970s, first, units of the Foreign Legion and mainly, the 2nd Foreign Infantry Regiment 2^{e} REI, the 1st Foreign Cavalry Regiment 1^{er} REC and then starting 1983, units of the general regime. 3 French parachute units were the first units of the French Army to integrate the D.L.E.M, the 3rd combat company of the 9th Parachute Chasseur Regiment (9^{e} R.C.P) in March 1983, the 4th combat company of the 1st Parachute Chasseur Regiment (1^{er} R.C.P) in August 1983 and the 3rd combat company of the 6th Marine Infantry Parachute Regiment, (6^{ème} RPIMa) in December 1983.

==== Regimental colors of the 2nd Foreign Cavalry Regiment ====
Guard of the regimental colors of the 2nd Foreign Cavalry Regiment, (2^{e} R.E.C), which carries the motto (« Pericula Ludus » – « To Danger my Pleasure ») 1666; the 2nd Foreign Cavalry Regiment (2ème R.E.C) was created in July 1939 on the substance of the squadron groups of Morocco issued from the 1st Foreign Cavalry Regiment 1e REC.

With the debut of World War II, the 2nd Foreign Cavalry Regiment was stationed in Morocco and part of its elements were quickly attached to the 97th Reconnaissance Group of the Infantry Division, (G.R.D 97) (French: Groupement de reconnaissance divisionnaire 97 (GRD97)) which engaged in combat on the metropolitan terrain during the German spring offensive of 1940, and which the divisionary group commander, Lieutenant-Colonel Boyer de Latour was killed leading at the bois de Noroy on 9 July of the same year. Following the armistice, the dissolution of the 2nd Foreign Cavalry Regiment, 2^{e} R.E.C was pronounced on 15 November 1940 and the regimental colors of the 2^{ème} R.E.C were entrusted to the honor guard of the 1st Foreign Cavalry Regiment.

The 2nd Foreign Cavalry Regiment was officially dissolved on 1 June 1946 at Sidi Bel Abbès, however, units forming the 2e R.E.C were recreated in November of the same year. Taking garrison at Oujda, where the regiment would remain until 1956; the regiment had for mission to instruct and train the reinforcements destined for the 1st Foreign Cavalry Regiment making way to the Far East.

Following the Paris accords in 1954 and the departure for Indochina in 1955, the 2nd Foreign Cavalry Regiment participated to the securing of Moroccan territories then, starting from 1956 to the missions of maintaining order of Algerian terrains, first in the sector of Laghouat, then, starting from 1958, the similar on the Tunisian barrage. In January 1962, the 2nd Foreign Cavalry Regiment made way on Biskra before being dissolved again following the Évian Accords.

In 5 years of campaigns in Algeria, the 2nd Foreign Cavalry Regiment, 2^{ème} REC placed outside their combat element 1022 rebel terrorists and recuperated 697 arms of which 30 automatic machine guns. In 1984, the Foreign Legion Detachment in Mayotte receives the honor guard regimental colors of the 2nd Foreign Cavalry Regiment.

== Organisation ==
Currently composed of 282 men, 162 of which are on short-term posting.

- Legion Pionniers Groups
- Compagnie de commandement et de logistique (CCL) – Command and Support Company
- Une unité PROTERRE – rotating company from either Foreign Legion or French and Foreign Airborne

== Traditions ==
(« Pericula Ludus » – « To Danger my Pleasure »).

=== Insignias ===
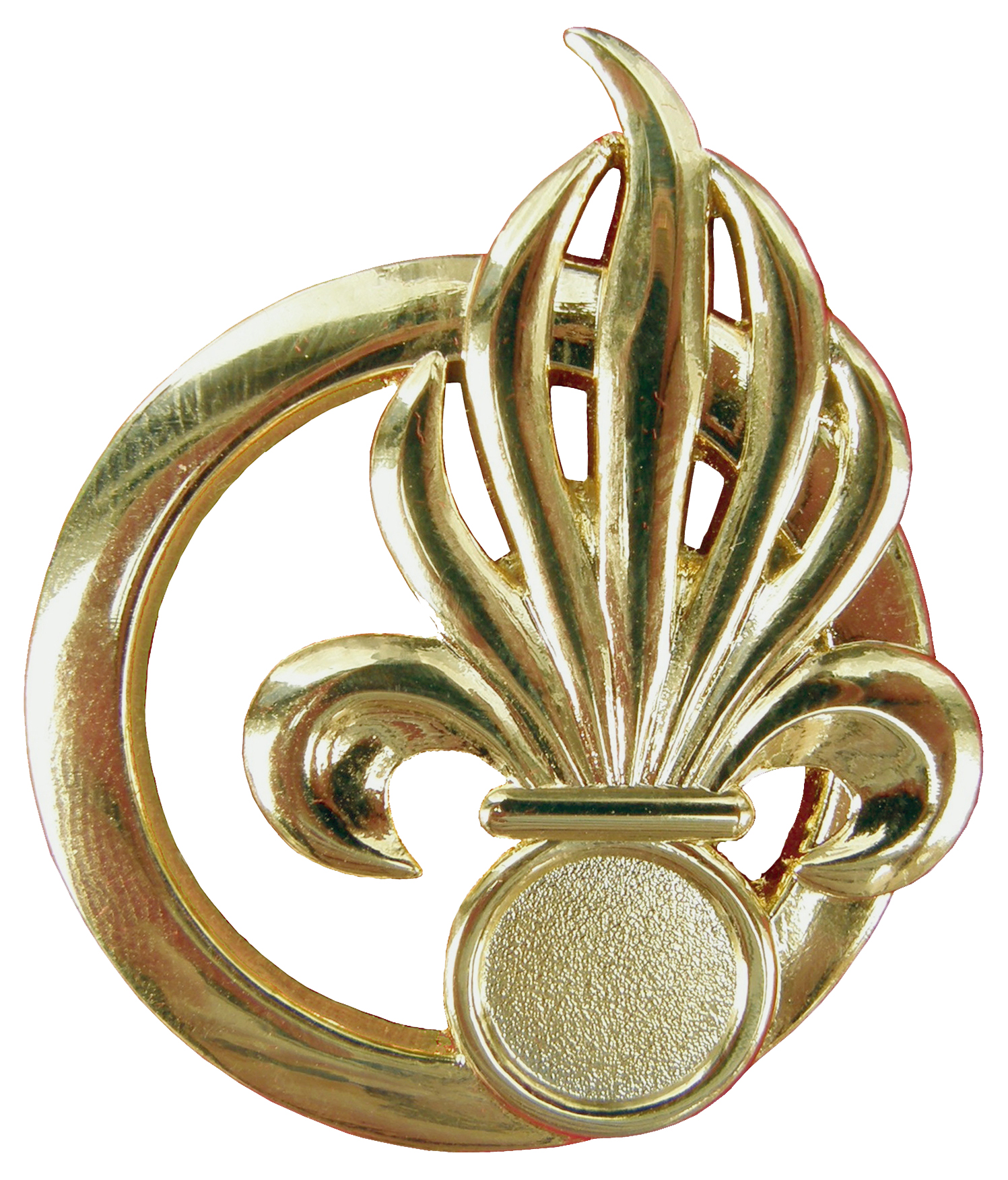
Beret insignia of the D.L.E.M

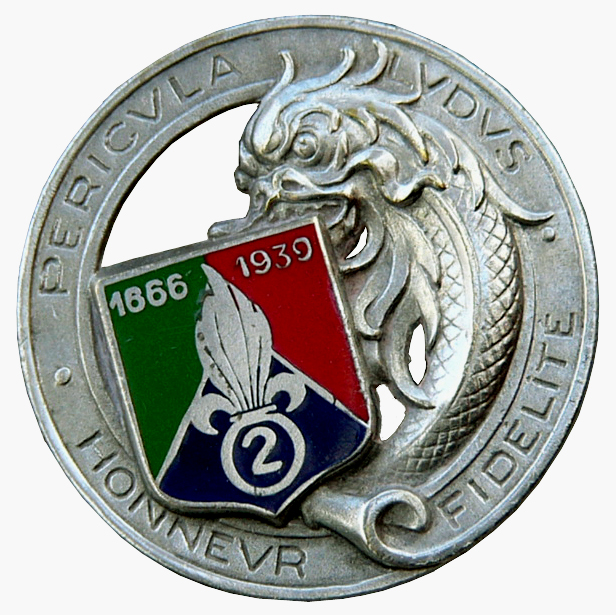
Regimental Insignia of the 2nd Foreign Cavalry Regiment, 2^{e} R.E.C

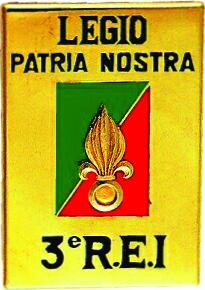
Regimental Insignia of the 3rd Foreign Infantry Regiment, 3^{e} R.E.I

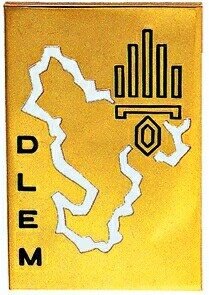
Foreign Legion Detachment in Mayotte, D.L.E.M

=== Regimental and Detachment Colors ===
- Heir to the Regimental Colors of the 3rd Foreign Infantry Regiment
- Regimental Colors of the 2nd Foreign Cavalry Regiment as of 1984

=== Decorations ===
Decorations of the 2nd Foreign Cavalry Regiment with cited decorations of the Foreign Legion Detachment in Mayotte.

=== Honours ===
==== Battle honours ====
As inscribed on the regimental colors of the 2nd Foreign Cavalry Regiment:

- Camerone 1863
- AFN 1952–1962

== Detachment Commanders ==
=== Detachment Commanders of the Foreign Legion Detachment in Mayotte ===
2nd Company of the 3rd Foreign Infantry Regiment
2ème Compagnie du 3ème Regiment Etranger d'Infanterie (2ème Co.du 3^{e} R.E.I)

- 1967–1969 : Captain Brissat
- 1969–1971 : Captain de LaJudie
- 1971–1973 : Captain Jean Mayer Dlec
- 1973–1975 : Captain François GrandJean
- 1975–1976 : Captain Yves Racaud

Foreign Legion Detachment in Mayotte
Détachement de Légion étrangère de Mayotte, DLEM (D.L.M.E)

- 1976–1977 : Lieutenant-Colonel Yves Racaud
- 1977–1979 : Lieutenant-Colonel Jean Sarrabere
- 1979–1981 : Lieutenant-Colonel Roger Bargoing
- 1981–1983 : Lieutenant-Colonel Jacques Paingault
- 1983–1985 : Lieutenant-Colonel Paul Savalle
- 1985–1987 : Lieutenant-Colonel Jean Caseneuve
- 1987–1989 : Colonel Michel Bourgogne
- 1989–1991 : Colonel Philippe Bouvattier
- 1991–1993 : Lieutenant-Colonel Bernard Dufour
- 1993–1995 : Lieutenant-Colonel Henri Cormier
- 1995–1997 : Colonel Georges Bon
- 1997–1999 : Lieutenant-Colonel André Mauguen
- 1999–2001 : Lieutenant-Colonel Patrick Esteve
- 2001–2003 : Lieutenant-Colonel Patrick Munoz
- 2003–2005 : LCL Rémi Bevillard
- 2005–2007 : Colonel Hervé Dominique Broda
- 2007–2009 : Lieutenant-Colonel François Compin
- 2009–2011 : Lieutenant-Colonel Bruno Schiffer
- 2011–2013 : Colonel Thibault O' Mahony
- 2013–2015 : Lieutenant-Colonel Jean de Mesmay
- 2015–2017 : Lieutenant-Colonel Rémi Bariety
- 2017-20** : Lieutenant-Colonel Thomas Labouche

== See also ==
- Major (France)
- French Foreign Legion Music Band (MLE)
- List of French Foreign Legion units
