= Paul Lacombe de La Tour =

French army officer

- Born: November 19, 1889; Paris, France
- Died: June 9, 1940 (aged 50); Noroy Woods, Compiègne, France
- Military career
- Allegiance: France
- Branch: (France) French Army; French Foreign Legion
- Service years: 1910 – June 9, 1940
- Rank: Lieutenant-colonel
- Commands: 97th Reconnaissance Group of the Infantry Division
- Conflicts: World War I World War II; Battle of France
- Awards: Officer of the Légion d'honneur (1923); Chevalier of the Légion d'honneur (1918)

Paul Lacombe de La Tour (November 19, 1889 – June 9, 1940) was a French army officer who served from 1910 to 1940 through both World War I and World War II. He eventually rose to the rank of lieutenant-colonel and led the 97th Reconnaissance Group of the Infantry Division into combat during the Battle of France. La Tour was killed in action while commanding a rear guard action which was covering the withdrawal of the 7th North African Infantry Division across the Oise River.

== Early life and World War I ==
La Tour entered the École spéciale militaire de Saint-Cyr in 1910, graduating in 1913. After graduation he was assigned to the 4th Regiment of Chasseurs. During the course of the war, he was wounded twice and received citations twelve times. After the Armistice he was awarded the rank of Chevalier of the Légion d'honneur.

== Interwar years ==
In 1919, La Tour was promoted to captain and was subsequently assigned to the 1st Cavalry Regiment of the Levant and later to the 1st Moroccan Spahis. In 1921, La Tour received another army-level citation for actions in Morocco. By 1923 he was awarded. In 1932 Captain La Combe La Tour was promoted to Chef de battalion and assigned to the 6th Regiment of Algerian spahis. In 1934 he served with the 1st Foreign Cavalry Regiment in which was stationed in Morocco at the time, thereby becoming a member of the French Foreign Legion. Eventually he was assigned to the 3rd Moroccan Spahis and he was assigned to 2nd Regiment of Chasseurs d'Afrique.

== World War II ==
On December 1, 1939, he took command of the 180th Divisional Reconnaissance Group which was shortly thereafter renamed as the 97th Reconnaissance Group of the Infantry Division(97th GRDI). On March 25, 1940, he took command of the 97th GRDI and was promoted to lieutenant colonel. On June 9, 1940, La Tour was killed in action as his unit covered the retreat of the 7th North African Infantry Division across the Oise River.
