= 44th Infantry Division (Wehrmacht) =

- 44. Infanterie-Division; Reichsgrenadier-Division Hoch- und Deutschmeister
- 1938–1943 & 1943–1945
- Active: 1 April 1938 – 8 May 1945
- Country: Nazi Germany
- Branch: German Army
- Type: Infantry
- Size: Division
- Motto: "Für Führer und Vaterland"
- Engagements: World War II: Poland 1939; France 1940; Eastern Front; Operation Barbarossa; Second Battle of Kharkov; Summer Offensive 1942; Stalingrad; Italy; Operation Achse; Monte Cassino; Operation Spring Awakening

Commanders
- Notable commanders: Albrecht Schubert; Franz Beyer

Insignia
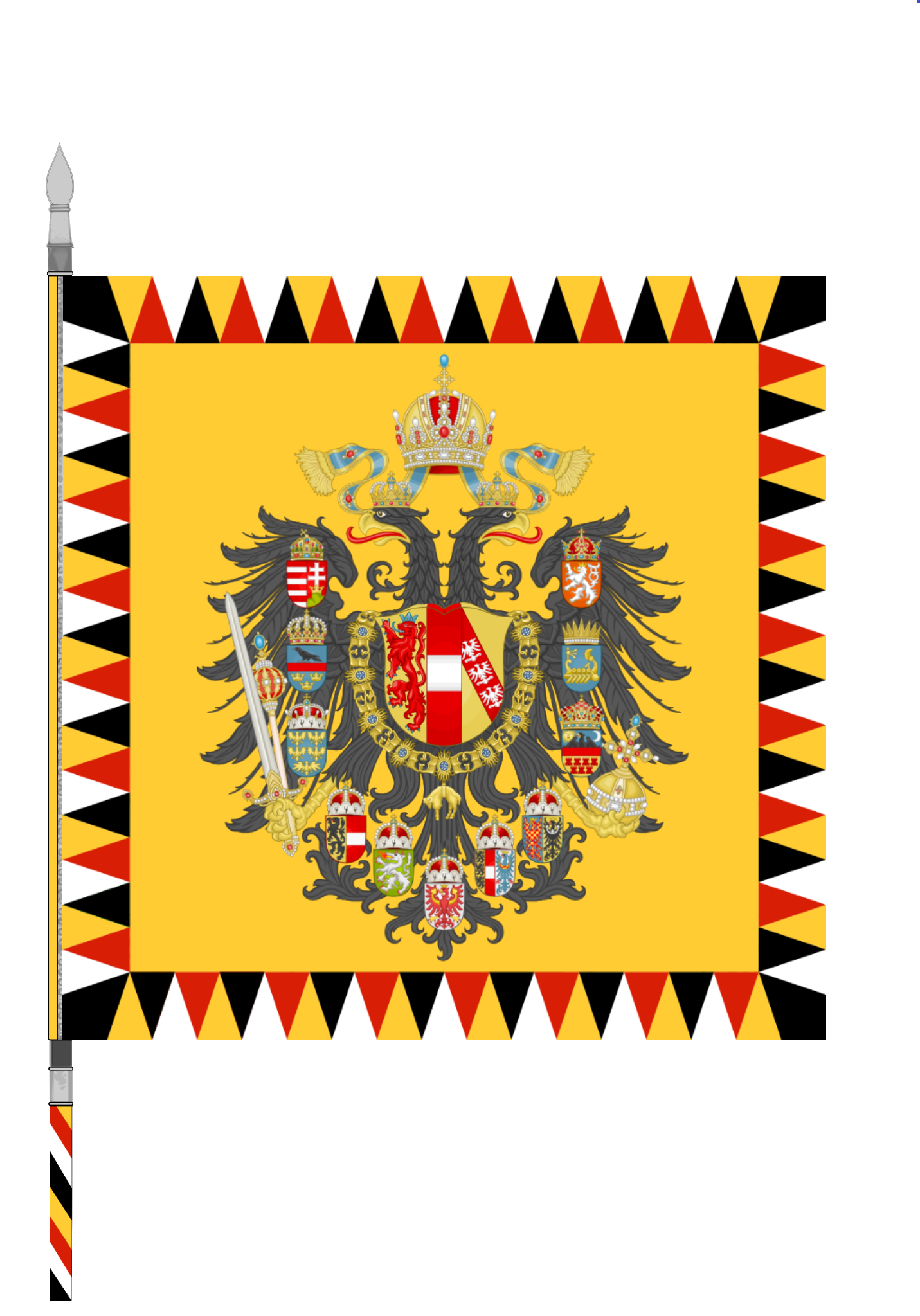
- Regimental standard

The 44th Infantry Division was formed on 1 April 1938 in Vienna, about two weeks after the Anschluss of Austria. It first saw combat at the start of the war in the Invasion of Poland, and also took part in the Battle of France in 1940. After a 9-month period of coastal defence the division was transferred East. On 22 June 1941, the division took part in the invasion of the Soviet Union, attached to Army Group South. It remained in the east after the failure of "Operation Barbarossa", taking part in defensive actions for the winter against the Soviet Army offensives near Izum and Kharkov. Refurbished, the division participated in the German summer offensive, and was subsequently destroyed with the 6th Army at Stalingrad in January 1943.

The division was rebuilt as Reichsgrenadier-Division Hoch- und Deutschmeister in Belgium when Hitler ordered the Stalingrad divisions should be reconstructed. By the summer of 1943 it was back up to strength and sent to fight in Italy, where it was heavily engaged at Monte Cassino. It withdrew up the Italian peninsula during 1944 and briefly clashed with American forces attacking the Gothic line. Withdrawn to refit, it was instead sent to oppose the Soviet breakthrough in Hungary. The division joined the efforts to recapture Budapest with the 6th SS Panzer Army, and was subsequently nearly destroyed near Lake Balaton. The remnants of the division retreated into Austria, until the final days of the war, when it marched west and surrendered to the American forces near Linz.

== Organization ==
The unit was established on 1 April 1938 shortly after the annexation of Austria from elements of the Austrian Army.

The organization followed the typical structure of a pre-war infantry division, with 3 infantry regiments of 3 battalions each, an artillery regiment of 3 battalions, and antitank, reconnaissance, pioneer, signals battalions and division services. The usual establishment called for around 15.000 men.

In January 1940 the Feldersatz Battalion was detached and became the 3rd battalion, 443rd infantry regiment, 164th infantry division, part of the 7th Wave of 14 divisions. The German Army continued to expand, in February 1940 the 10 divisions of the 8th wave were created. The 44th gave up 2nd battalion 143 Infantry Regiment which became 1st battalion 523rd Infantry Regiment, 297 Infantry Division. The battalion was replaced.

In September 1940, one third of the division was detached to form the 137th Infantry Division. The German Army formed new divisions by detaching one-third of two existing divisions, then raising the remaining parts from new recruits. In this manner only one-third of the two old and one newly created divisions were new recruits.

Like all the divisions lost in the Battle of Stalingrad, it was reformed using other formations and usually a cadre of specialists who had been evacuated by air before the 6th Army's surrender. On 17 February 1943, the division was reformed with the 887th and 888th Grenadier Regiments in Belgium. On 1 June 1943, the 134th Grenadier Regiment was added, and the division renamed Reichsgrenadier-Division Hoch- und Deutschmeister, along with the 80th Panzerjager, 46th Pioneer, 64th Signals, and 44th Divisional support units.

From August to November 1943, schwere Panzer-Kompanie/Tigergruppe Meyer, equipped with eight Tiger I tanks, was attached to the division for the disarmament of Italian formations in northern Italy. After a brief rest it was transferred to Hungary and fought the Red Army while retreating into Austria. It managed to avoid capture by the Red Army and surrendered to US forces at Hohenfurth on 10 May 1945.

== Combat history ==
=== Poland ===
In late August 1939 the 44th Infantry Division was transferred to Moravia, previously part of Czechoslovakia, assembled opposite the Polish border and attached to XVII Corps, a component of 14th Army. Nine days later, in the early hours of 1 September 1939, after a short artillery preparation, infantry waded the Olsa River into Polish territory. Soon the first prisoners were taken and the first casualties suffered. The Second World War in Europe, which, for the 44th Infantry Division would last from its first day in September 1939, to its last in May 1945, had started.

The ethnic Germans, Volksdeutsche, in the border regions greeted the invading troops with some enthusiasm, with gifts of milk and fruit which were picked up by the soldiers along the roadside.

The 14th Army pushed its forces rapidly towards Kraków and Tarnow against light resistance from the Polish 'Army of Kraków' By 6 September the division entered Kraków and captured undamaged bridges across the Weichsel. The division continued its advance, crossing the San River and pushing into eastern Poland towards Lviv (Lemburg). The last Polish troops surrendered on 6 October 1939.

The territory in eastern Poland, as had already been agreed between Hitler and Stalin, in a secret annex to the German Soviet Non Aggression Pact, would fall under the Soviet sphere of interest, so the 44th Division was withdrawn across the demarcation line and deployed along the River San. The 44th Infantry Division had lost 121 killed, 270 wounded and 44 missing; it took 300 officers and 25,000 men as prisoners and marched 540 km, in the campaign against Poland a daily average of 29 km. After the end of the Polish campaign, the division returned to its home station until it was moved to central Germany as OKH reserve, and finally shifted west for the start of the Campaign against France.

=== France 1940 ===
In May 1940, at the start of the German attack on France, the 44th Infantry Division was in OKH reserve near Hameln. Assigned to 6th Army on 15 May, it moved forward behind the main spearheads, and eventually on 29 May was inserted into a defensive sector on the Somme near Péronne, protecting the southern flank of the German breakthrough. Here it remained as the Allied armies fell back to Dunkirk and evacuated.

Realigning their forces to the south, the German High Command instigated plan red (Fall Rot), the attack into France. As part of 6th Army, the 44th Infantry Division would attack south out of its bridgehead across the Somme and strike the French forces manning the Weygand line. Striking in the early morning hours of 5 June, the infantry attack swept forward, infiltrating between the French fortified villages, but faltered as the open ground offered little in the way of concealment from enemy observation. By the afternoon, their forces were suffering from accurate French artillery bombardments, mortar and machine gun fire, directed from the French positions. One battalion, the I/134, overextended itself trying to outflank the village of Foucaucourt and became cut off, and Captain Hartmann, the commanding officer surrendered along with 216 men.

The robust defence of 5 June by the French 19th Division and the 7th North African division forced Generalleutnant Schubert, the 44th Division commander, to withdraw his attacking units in the evening. In Schubert's discussion with the XXXX Corps commander, General Stumme, additional artillery support was organised for the following day and it was agreed that the fortified villages would have to be stormed and taken before the division could continue its advance.

On the second day of attack, the 132 Infantry Regiment managed to take the village of Chuignolles and the surrounding area, and for which the battalion commander of III / 132, Oberstleutnant Karl Eibl was awarded the Knights Cross. But French resistance remained fierce, beating back the division's further assaults. The situation was about to change in the attackers' favour. On its left flank, the French line had been penetrated by tanks of 3rd and 4th Panzer divisions. The French 7th Army was left with no alternative but to withdraw, which they did by the morning of 7 June. The division now pushed forwards, occasionally clashing with enemy forces, but noting increasing signs of French disintegration.

Deciding that Paris could not be defended, the French government declared it an open city and withdrew their forces behind the Seine. By 14 June the 44th Division was already approaching the river. Once across the Seine the division's advance accelerated, pushing south until it arrived in the vicinity of Orléans by the declaration of the French surrender. The 44th Infantry Division suffered 1,730 casualties in battle of France. This was followed by coastal protection duties in La Rochelle area until the end of March 1941.

=== Invasion of the Soviet Union ===
==== Barbarossa ====
The division was part of the initial attack forces in Operation Barbarossa as part of Army Group South. On 22 June 1941, the division crossed the river Bug in rubber boats and ferries and created a 5-mile bridgehead. Overcoming resistance at the border the division marched eastward behind the more rapid mobile units of 1st Panzer Group. The division took part in the Battle of Brody, engaging the Soviet 34th Tank division, part of the Soviet 8th Mechanized Corps, in the flank. Over the next 3 days the division helped hem in the Soviet armour, the 131st Regiment's heavy infantry gun company knocking out at least 1 52 ton KV II, until the remnants of the encircled Soviet forces fought their way out to the east. After the Soviet Army counter-attacks receded, and the mechanised Corps withdrew where they could to regroup, their tank forces seriously diminished. However, the action had delayed 1st Panzer Group units and the 44th, 111th and 299th divisions would be stalled for several days greatly hampering the follow-up of infantry behind III Panzer Corps advance.

III Panzer Corps had meanwhile struck out towards Kiev driving a 40 km wide wedge between the Soviet 6th and 5th Armies. Mikhail Kirponos, commander of the Southwestern Front, ordered both armies to counterattack and close the gap. The 5th Army in the north had the protection of the Pripet marshes to its rear and still had 3 Mechanised Corps under command. Using these it moved southward cutting the supply road behind the panzer spearheads. The 44th Infantry was ordered to help clear the road and on 14 July it clashed with 9th Mechanized Corps on the Zhitomir road. The Soviet Army units, which had inflicted considerable damage on the Germans were forced gradually back towards the north-east.

==== Kiev ====
The Soviet forces had been working on the defences in front of Kiev since the German invasion began, and mobilised an additional 50,000 citizens to dig anti-tank ditches. Their fortified zone was well outside the city and stretched for 80 km, and consisted of a series of bunkers, obstacles and ditches, backed up by fortress machine gun battalions. German Armour reached the outer zone but, not wanting to get embroiled in fighting for fixed positions, waited for the arrival of the infantry of XXIX Corps. The infantry, well behind the Panzer divisions, and having to fend off Soviet counterattacks on the way, struggled to catch up but by the close of July XXIX Corps had assembled 5 infantry divisions and was ready for an attack on the city of Kiev.

Launched on 1 August, the two central divisions of the Corps smashed through the fortified bunker zone and in 7 days of fighting against determined Soviet resistance, reached the suburbs of the city.

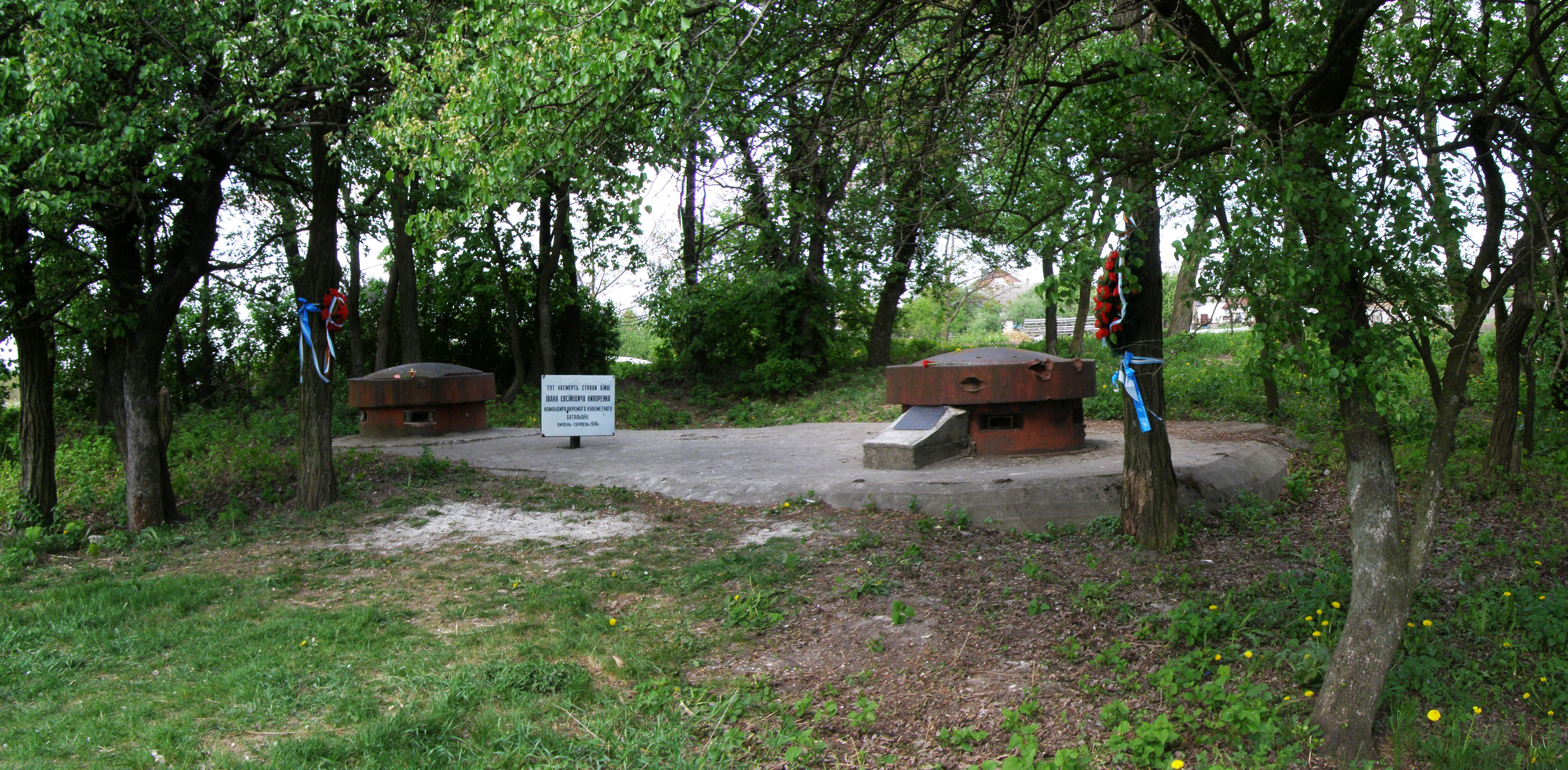
Soviet bunker in the 44th Division sector

The 44th Infantry Division providing flanking support on the right, only got as far as the outer bunkers before being hit by counterattacks from the 175th Rifle Division. The Soviet Army command threw in militia battalions and airborne troops and forced the German center back. By 11 August, XXIX Corps' attack had run out of steam with both sides suffering heavy losses. 44th Infantry was withdrawn and assigned a sector north of Kiev, where late in the month it conducted probing attacks against Soviet positions along the river Irpen, but without success.

Von Reichenau, 6th Army commander, struggled to deal with the Soviet 5th Army on his northern flank for much of July and August and it was only with the assistance of the 9th Panzer Division, loaned from von Kleist's Panzer Group 1, that he finally managed to pick up momentum, and push through to the Dnieper north of Kiev, where he formed a bridgehead. The river, a considerable obstacle at this point at over 900m, was spanned by army engineers with a pontoon bridge and 6th Army began filtering infantry forces across to the eastern bank, where they could threaten Soviet forces east of Kyiv and eventually link up with 2nd Army units coming from the north.

Meanwhile, far to the east, tanks of 1st and 2nd Panzer groups met, forming a huge cauldron and encircling elements of 5 Soviet Armies. The German command needed to break up the pocket as quickly as possible and trap and destroy the Soviet Armies inside it. The 44th Infantry Division was ordered to leave the siege lines outside of Kiev and cross the Dnieper by the pontoon bridge, from where it went forward to block Soviet forces fleeing eastward trying to escape the German trap. In the last days of September the fighting in the cauldron concluded, and the division resumed its advance eastwards, hindered more by the arrival of the autumn rains, which turned the roads to mud, than Soviet resistance. By November the division arrived in the area of Achtyrka, west of Kharkov where it went into the Army Group reserve.

==== Winter ====
During the winter of 1941/1942 the division was assigned a defensive sector south of Kharkov, still under command of the 6th Army, on the Army boundary with 17th Army to the south.

By January, 1942 Stalin wanted to capitalise on the success of the counter offensives around Moscow, and expanded the scope of the Soviet winter operations to include northern and southern sectors of the front. As part of this effort Southwestern and Southern Fronts conducted the Barvinkove-Losowaja Operation with 6, 57 & 38 Armies. German defences in the sector along the Dornets river, west of Izyum, consisted of disconnected strong points rather than a continuous line.

The attack commenced on 18 January, hit a weak section of the German line along the Dornets river, west of Izyum, and ripped away German defences along a 60-mile front. After a week the Soviets had driven 100 km into the German line, and now as well as its eastern front, the 44th division positioned on the northern edge of the breakthrough with its southern flank along the frozen Donets wide open, except for some hastily assembled reserves rushed to the area by 6th Army. The 44th bent its right flank back, basing its defence on a string of small communities readied for all round defence, most notably Balakleja. The Soviet command, eager to expand its success, ordered the 38th Soviet Army to attack, and it launched a series of furious frontal assaults attempting to dislodge the German defenders.

Unable to dislodge the 44th Divisions defences, the Soviet 38th Army regrouped and tried again in March, but with much the same result. The stubborn defence of the 44 Division contributed greatly to the 6 Army's ability to stabilise the situation and a grateful German command awarded both 131 and 134 Regimental commanders the Knights Cross The division's exploits were reported back to Berlin when a newspaper article reported that between 16 January and 7 February the division had repulsed 142 separate Russian attacks, claiming 6600 dead in front of their positions, 1300 prisoners and the capture or destruction of 27 tanks, 14 guns and much other equipment.

"Operation Blue", the summer offensive, began on 28 June with the attack of 4th Panzer Army but the start of 6th Army was delayed for several days by heavy rain which turned the roads into quagmires. Finally starting on the last day of June, the infantry, achieved success and penetrated 20 miles into Soviet defences on the first day.

The armoured divisions, in spite of sporadic fuel shortages forged ahead leaving the infantry to follow. In 18 days the division covered over 300 miles. Dust hung in the summer heat as columns of infantry and their mostly horse drawn guns and supplies laboured eastward across the open Steppe and through vast fields of sunflowers. The 6th Army drive, lacking in armour, was slowing and Russian resistance increasing when 44th Division came up hard against Soviet 62nd Army defences in the great bend of the Don.

Finally getting spearheads along the Don from the north and the south, parts of the 62nd Army were trapped near Kalash. 44th Division, holding what was now the western side of a pocket, pushed inwards and in four days helped round up the surrounded Soviets giving 6th Army a victory and netting 50.000 prisoners.(This number is incorrect since only about 28.000 Soviet soldiers were caught in the trap.)

==== Stalingrad ====
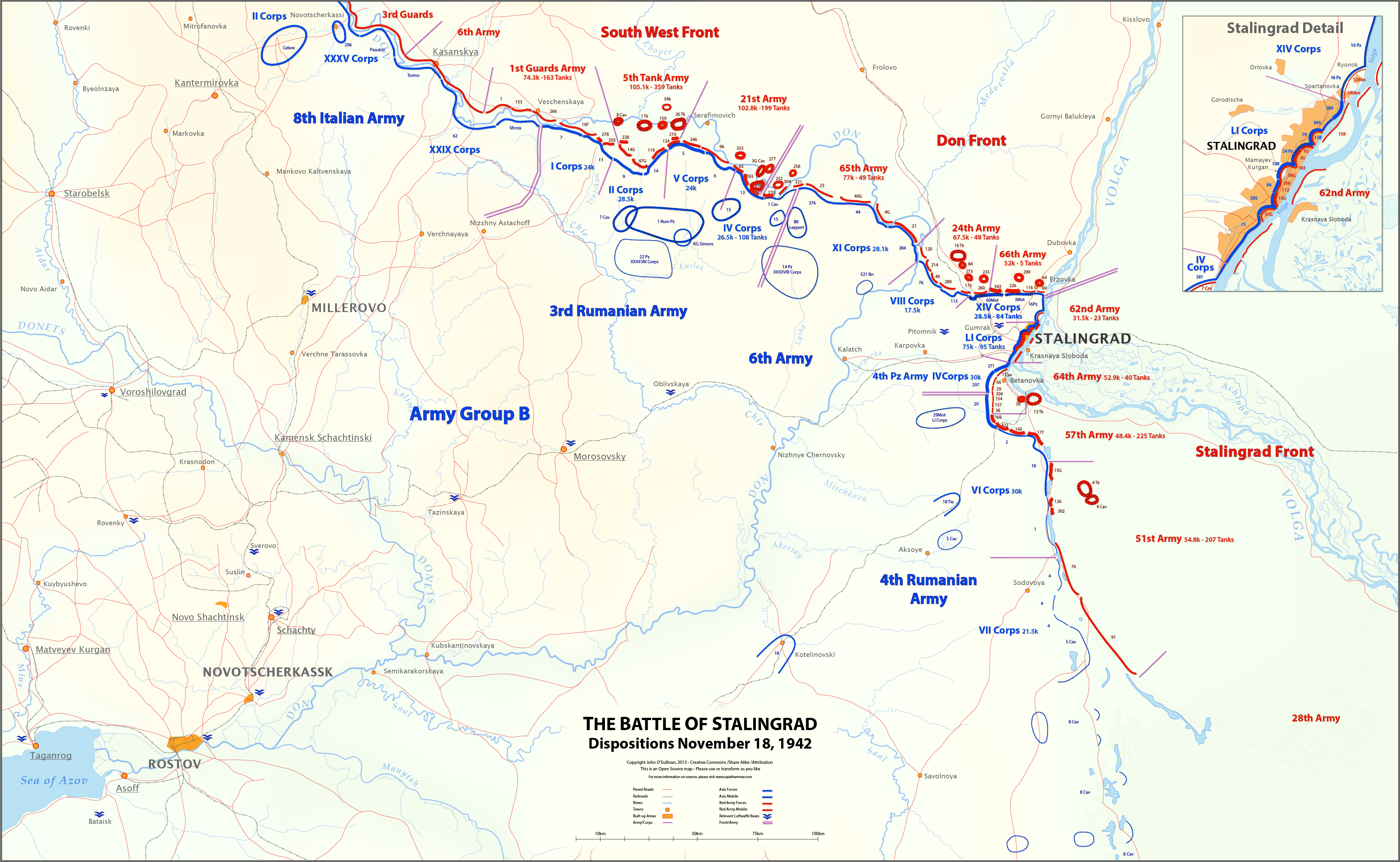
Stalingrad – Preparations for Operation Uranus

By September 1942 the division took up defensive positions on the high banks of the Don, protecting the long left flank of the 6th Army in Stalingrad. On 19 November the Soviet Army opened Operation Uranus against Romanian forces to the north. Manoilin, one of the supply bases for the division had already been attacked by Soviet armour units. An attack against this sector had not been totally unexpected by the German command, and the previous day the 6th Army authorised the 44 Infantry to release the 132 Infantry Regiment from its defensive positions along the bluffs overlooking the Don, for commitment elsewhere. The regiment was already short of men, so it dissolved one battalion (III/132) and distributed its men to the other two.

The regiment was issued movement orders to secure Verkhne-Buzinovka, 25 miles behind the Division's front line, and arrived there to find Soviet Army forces threatening weak German Army units in the area. Outflanked by Soviet units which captured Kalash on the 4th day of Operation Uranus, the division abandoned its former defensive positions and began to retreat across the steppe to the 6th Army in and around Stalingrad. Its movements were hampered by a 'catastrophic' fuel situation and the decision by 6th Army to move many of the division's horses to the west out of the combat zone. On 26 November it crossed the Don at Luchinsky, where engineers blew up the army bridge behind it, and two days later the 44th Division reached its place in the new perimeter of around Stalingrad.

The Soviet Red Army forces were quick to test the defences, mounting infantry attacks supported by armoured groups of up to 60 tanks. On 4 December the main line of resistance was over-run in an attack forcing 6th Army to commit its remaining reserves. A battle group from 384 Infantry Division, 12 tanks from 16 Panzer Division and some assault artillery managed to restore the old positions the following day.

Probing attacks continued through the month and the failure of the air transports into the German pocket meant that shortages were now beginning to be really felt. The artillery was limited to 5 shots per day and the bread ration was cut to 200g per day, then to 100 and finally on 26 December to 50 grammes. The combat strength of the infantry battalions were rapidly sinking: combat, persistent harassing mortar and artillery fire, and also cold and illness were taking their toll. To keep up numbers, artillerymen and even construction workers, as well as soldiers from disbanded units and Romanians, were turned into infantrymen. As the fighting continued through December and into January an increasing number of support personnel were used in the front line. By 2 January all the horse meat had been eaten and the physical condition of the troops was rapidly deteriorating while replacements combed from the service units were found to be willing but lacking in basic infantry training.

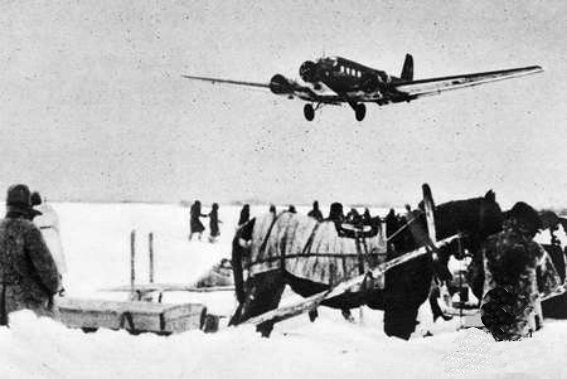
Ju 52 approaching Pitomnik Airfield in Stalingrad. The 44th Infantry Division defended the approaches in January 1943

On 10 January 1943 the Red Army unleashed their attack on the pocket, the 65th and 21st armies overwhelmed the 44th divisional defenses on the first day. By 12 January the western protuberance of the pocket, the karpovka nose, was eliminated, and groups of German units had to retreat. The remnants of the division were pushed back into Stalingrad. Now only a single gun was left to the divisional artillery, and the infantry regiments formed battle groups with their few remaining men mixed with a variety of other combat and service troops, and equipped with only rifles and a few light machine guns. All the other heavy weapons had been abandoned in the retreat, or had no ammunition.

On 27 January General Deboi, the divisional commander, joined the 131 Battle Group to 'be with the infantry' at the end. Finally, with no more food or ammunition, resistance ended, the surviving officers joined their last troops in surrender, and the 44 Infantry Division ceased to exist.

=== Italy ===
On 25 July 1943 Mussolini was removed from Office by King Victor Emmanuel and replaced as prime minister by Marshal Badoglio Although Badoglio publicly declared a continuation of the war and the pact with Germany Hitler immediately suspected that he would seek to make peace with the Allies. The German military forces in Italy remained weak, most combat capable combat units were fighting in Sicily, with very little on the mainland, capable of dealing with a swift Italian defection.

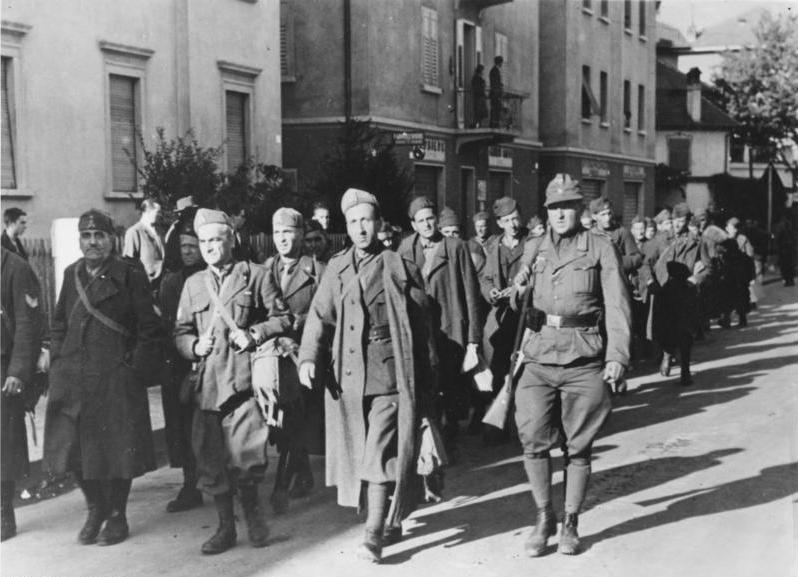
Captured Italian soldiers parade through Bolzano.

Hitler recalled Rommel to Berlin and ordered him to take on the problem of securing German interests in Northern Italy and to use his newly set up Army Group B headquarters to control the new forces that would soon be moved into the area. Orders for these troop movements soon began to be issued, but to get the troops into the theatre, first the vital communications route through the mountains had to be secured. On 26 July, Field Marshal von Rundstedt, at OB West Headquarters was ordered to move 2 divisions immediately to secure the Alpine passes, the 305th went towards Nice and the 44th towards the Brenner pass. Divisional units of the 44th Infantry Division began arriving in Innsbruck, Austria on 27 July, and by the month's end it was on the border at the Brenner pass. Its admission into Italy proper, however, now became a matter of political debate between the higher political and military establishments of Italy and Germany.

The new Italian leadership did not want more German units to enter the country as that would enable the Germans to take control. However, they were not ready to openly oppose the Germans at this time and they could not deny the logic of the German argument, that more military units would be needed to repel the Allied armies, so eventually permission was granted. The 44th quickly took control of the rail line as far as Bolzano, and by the next day infiltration of Army group B units was in full swing.

On 8 September Badoglio announced an armistice between the Italian Forces and the Allies on Radio Rome. The Italian defection, had long been foreseen by Hitler who had instructed the OKW to develop contingency plans to deal with it. Operation Achse would see the disarming and disbanding of the military of the former German ally, and the take over of the Italian State by Germany, using force if necessary. But, in the event, little force would be required as the Italian Armed forces, lacking any clear leadership began to dissolve and capitulation ensued. The 44th Division, still in the South Tyrol, quickly seized the Italian XXXV Corps Headquarters in Bolzano, and a huge haul of prisoners, including 1783 officers, amongst which were 18 Generals, and 50,000 men.

With the Italian military no longer policing its territory, Yugoslavian partisan activity flared up in Istria and Carniola. This area had mixed populations of Italians, Slovenians and Croatians, and Carniola, part of Yugoslavia in 1939, had only recently been annexed by Italy in 1941. OKW ordered Army Group B to safeguard vital interests and communications routes in the area, and Rommel complied. Tasking II SS Panzer Corps to lead, and utilising the considerable forces at the disposal of Army Group B, several sweeps were conducted from late September to mid November, claiming success and the killing or capturing of thousands of partisans and capturing of much materiel.

==== The Bernhardt Line ====
In November 1943 Kesselring went to Berlin to meet with Hitler. He told the German leader that he believed the Allies could be held south of Rome at the winter line for six months. Shortly after Kesselring was given overall command of the armies in Italy, and Rommel relinquished his command of Army Group B. Now with access to an extra eight and a half divisions, including the 44th Infantry Division, Kesselring had the additional forces he needed to attempt to fulfil his promise to Hitler. He wanted to relieve his mobile divisions to rebuild their strength and use them as a mobile reserve against likely landings behind the German line

Meanwhile, the American-led 5th Army had broken out of the Salerno beachhead, joined with the British 8th Army, which had entered the boot of Italy from Sicily and were pushing the German forces back northward as they fought delaying actions through successive defensive lines. Kesselring wanted to delay their advance as long as possible to gain time to build up the defences of the Gustav line, also called the winter line. The 44th Infantry Division would bolster these efforts and was ordered to entrain and move south to the front.

At the end of November 1943, 44th HuD units began to arrive and the most advanced battalions were sent forward to relieve units of the 26th Panzer Division, which were to be redeployed. The division took over its new positions including numerous protected shelters, pill boxes, and mortar positions built on reverse slopes, on a series of high mountain peaks dominating the road to St Elia and the Rapido Valley. Also in its sector was the village of Lagon, whose houses had been fortified. These positions were soon under attack by the US VI Corps, which pushed its units into the mountains, attempting to draw German reserves away from the main effort that would occur further to the south, in the Mignano Gap.

In spite of the inherent defensive advantages of mountainous terrain and the harsh winter weather, the soldiers of the 44th division realised that they were not correctly equipped for either winter or mountain warfare. They had the wrong clothing and their horse drawn supply units were found to be useless in the mountain trails. The division quickly had to swap some of its wagons for mule trains, and some artillery for mountain guns. Moreover, it was now inserted into major combat, for the first time since it was rebuilt, against a well resourced enemy, including air power. Indeed, several units had already suffered attacks from Allied fighter bombers, known as 'jabo's', upon retraining north of Cassino and on the way to the Bernhardt line.

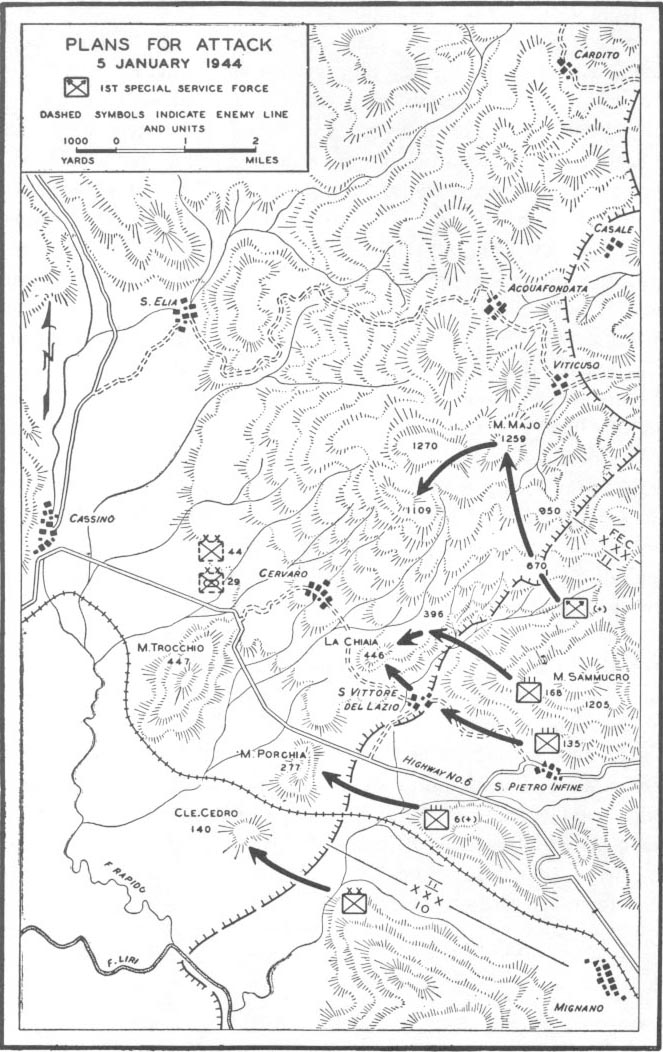
Map of US Plans for Attack, 5 January 1943 on German position in front of the Gustav line

The US 45th Division's objectives were to be the village of Lagon and several of the peaks that dominated the village and the road to St Elia. Key to these was peak 769, and several days of combat around peak 769 followed, between elements of the 179th US Infantry Regiment and 2 Kompanie 131 Regiment, with the summit changing hands. Finally the Americans secured the summit for good and the 2/131 withdrew from its last positions on the reverse slopes with only 12 men and one officer remaining in the company. On 9 December the US Division attacked the Germans in Lagon, capturing the village two weeks later.

When the 5th Mountain division became available, the 10th Army replaced the 44th Division in the mountains and shifted it south to cover the more likely approach to the Liri valley, at the M gap. It would cover a wide sector with its units interspersed with those of the 29th Panzer Grenadier division. The defence was based on a series of low hills on either side of Highway 6, with the landscape rising dramatically on its left flank to the 1270 m high mount Majo. The US Fifth Army had used the short lull in operations since mid-December to freshen its forces, and plan for the renewed attack. The attack would use a task force from 1st Armoured Division, plus some British support on the left, two regiments of the 34th US Infantry Division, the 168th and the 135th, on the right and some special service troops on the high peaks of Mount Majo. The 1st Special Service Regiment had a battalion of specifically trained mountain troops, and these were used to cross the difficult terrain and seize the summit of Mt Majo on 4 January. The summit was in the sector of the 44th's 132 Infantry Regiment, who mounted repeated counterattacks but failed to regain the lost ground and suffered badly at the hands of American artillery of the US 93rd Armoured Field Artillery Battalion fired in support of the special service troops. The Special Service troops went on to secure the neighbouring peaks. With the high peaks secured the US forces launched their drive along highway 6. The attack started well when forces from 168th lead battalion were ambushed by elements of III/132 under Lt Prandl who captured 2 officers and 68 men. The Americans, however, went on into the village of Venafro with the 135th US Regiment, and after two days of difficult fighting, captured it, taking 170 prisoners from the 44th Division.

The US forces then pressed on to the ridge behind the village, La Chinia, one of their major objectives, which at that point was still held by the III/132. The German battalion was forced off the summit after 2 days of fighting. The 44th Division had suffered heavy casualties and had everywhere been driven from its defences. von Senger, the korps commander, then brought up fresh forces to slow the Allied advance and allowed the 44th to fall back into the Gustav positions in and around Cassino for a few days' rest and replenishment.

1st Battle of Cassino

==== Cassino ====
British 10 Corps were the first to attack the Gustav line proper, in the coastal sector, and with some success, necessitating Kesselring to commit his mobile reserves down from Rome to stop them. This allowed the US VI Corps to land successfully and virtually unopposed at Anzio on 22 January 1944 and form a beach head. With the Anzio landings in full swing but the British drive now almost completely stopped, General Clark, commander of the US 5th Army needed to keep the pressure up on the Gustav line to prevent the Germans shifting reserves back to Anzio. A crack in the Gustav line, together with the threat of the Anzio beachhead would render the whole of the German defensive position south of Rome untenable. The attack by the 36 US infantry division across the Rapido in the Liri valley was a costly failure, so General Clark now launched Juin's French expeditionary force, and the US 34 US ID against the Cassino Massif itself. The French would attack from the village of St Elise at the head of the Rapido, across the Belmonte valley and up and onto Mt Belvedere and beyond that Colle Abate, which, at 919 m high, dominated the whole area. The US division would attack across the flooded Rapido, capture the hills beyond, wheel left and take the town and monastery hill.

===== German dispositions =====
The renewed Allied attack would crash straight into the 44th division defences around Cassino. The division had 3 battalions of 132nd Infantry Regiment positioned in prepared positions along the Rapido valley, and 2 further battalions of 131st Infantry Regiment in the village of Caira and on Mt Belvedere. Units of 71st Division 191st Infantry Regiment were under command in the Belmonte Valley, linking into 5th Mountain Division on the left flank. Most of the 143rd Infantry regiment was in reserve, rebuilding after heavy losses in the Bernhardt line fighting.

===== The French attack =====
The first to test the 44th defenses in the Gustav line were the French. The French Expeditionary Corps under the highly capable General Juin, had already been pushing forward against the defenses of the 5th Mountain Division on the left flank of the 44 Infantry. They had captured the village of St Elisa in the Rapido valley from which an assault against the Cassino massive, and a push up the Secco valley could be launched.

On 25 January 1944 2 battalions of 4th regiment of Tunisian Tirailleurs (4RTT), part of the 3rd Algerian Infantry crossed the valley and scaled Mt Belvedere using a steep ravine as cover. This was a considerable feat in itself as the French units had not been allocated any mules and the soldiers had to carry huge loads up the precipitous ravine, but it gave the attack cover and allowed access to the summit without suffering any substantial losses.

Upon arrival a fierce firefight developed with elements of 131 infantry regiment, but the end of the day the French prevailed and pushed the Germans from most of the summit of Mt Belvedere. During the night, the French managed to get some reinforcements onto the summit and the following day continued their advance and through great effort and bravery of their troops captured the high points on Mt Abate.

This feature, 919 m high, was the dominant peak in the area and in good weather could give the allies a commanding view of the whole area, including many German rear areas.

By dawn of 27 January the French had reached their objectives, but their position was precarious, some of the attacking companies had been reduced by casualties to individuals, or mere handfuls of men mainly from incessant German artillery and mortar fire. Moreover, resupply of the troops was almost impossible, and they were soon running out of ammunition, food and water. Von Senger, seeing the danger to the whole German position from the French success, reacted swiftly, throwing in the entire reserves of the 44th Infantry Division, a battalion of the 131st, the whole of the 134th Regiment, and a battalion from the 191st infantry regiment under command. To these he added a few companies from assorted units and some pioneers and concentrated them on the slopes of Mt Abate and in the Secco valley.

For 3 days the Germans now mounted incessant counter-attacks on the exposed French positions

===== The 34 US Division attack =====
Thick minefields and rows of barbed wire had been laid in the marshes and on the gently rising ground at the base of the mountains to prevent the passage of tanks or foot troops. A chain of bunker positions, stronger than any encountered before, had been built, some reinforced with concrete, some with railroad ties from the ruined station at Cassino, but all of them dug and blasted out from the rock of the Cassino hills. Not content with natural fortifications the enemy had installed portable steel pillboxes, half-buried in the ground, each containing a machine gun. Every man and every weapon had shelter from artillery fire. In support of their infantry positions, emplacements were prepared for self-propelled guns which could mount the trails on the northwest side of a hill without being observed by us, fire a few rounds, and disappear. A large concentration of gun positions had been constructed close to the hills behind Cassino and close to Highway 6 where they had good protection from our counter-battery fire.

— The Story of the 34th Infantry Division Book I • Louisiana to Pisa,
Chapter XIII • CASSINO • Storming

Attacking across the Rapido, infantry from the 133 Infantry Regiment, 34 US Division found the river in its upper reaches fordable, but the flooded banks, compounded by German minefields caused its armoured support to bog down. The infantry that managed to get across were met by accurate artillery and heavy weapons fire from German 132 Infantry Regiment units, shielded from the US artillery preparation in their deep bunkers, so that the Americans were forced back to their starting positions. The next night the 34 Division tried again but with the same result.

For the first four days the American attack stalled at the river line, the infantry unable to capitalise on their gains until 29 January when the US 168 Infantry Regiment found a weak spot and managed to get tanks across in greater numbers. Working in tandem, the American tanks suppressed the German bunkers, allowing the infantry to overrun the German positions in the valley and push on to the low hills, taking the village of Caira and capturing the staff of 1 Battalion, 131 Infantry Regiment into the bargain.

On 1 February, the Italian Barracks at the base of the hills, still in the hands of the 44 Division, was stormed by troops of US 133 Infantry Regiment and the area was finally cleared by the Americans on the following day after fierce fighting.

At the beginning of February the positions of the 132 Infantry Regiment in the Rapido were mostly over run and its battalions decimated. It was clear to the corps commander von Senger that the 44 Division could not hold on its own. Its divisional reserves had already been committed against the French and fresh forces would be needed to bolster its sector around Cassino. These were soon to arrive; the 211 Infantry Regiment went into Cassino town and the first two battalions of 90 Panzer Grenadier Division arrived shortly after, followed by the first of the parachute units that would become synonymous with the Cassino defence. On 2 February General Baade, commander of the 90 Panzer Grenadiers took over the vital Cassino sector and the 44 Division's 132 Regiment was withdrawn to rebuild.

=== Hungary ===
In the autumn of 1944 the Soviet 2nd Ukrainian Front broke through the Transylvanian Alps and into the central Hungarian plain and by the end of October had already reached the Danube river below Budapest. The Danube, with high water levels from recent rains and swampy banks was potentially a major barrier, and could have acted as a formidable break to the Soviet advance, and a considerable defensive asset if the Axis powers had forces enough to man it. But the bulk of German major formations in the country were falling back into northern Hungary to protect the capital, and Army Group F, given responsibility for lower Hungary had little with which to stop the Soviet Red Army advance. The Soviet 57th Army reached the river and quickly threw 2 bridgeheads across at Mohács and Baja. Army Group F could only erect a fragile screen around the Soviet bridgeheads, and call for reinforcements.

The 44th Infantry Division had just settled into its refreshment area around Udine, in Italy, when this latest crisis on the eastern front led to the OKW issuing orders on 7 November for its transfer to Hungary. The division hurriedly boarded 60 trains heading for Pecs in lower Hungary.

The Soviet 57th Army continued a slow buildup on the west bank, until Tolbukhin, the 3rd Ukrainian Front commander, committed substantial additional forces. The 57th and 4th Guards Armies launched a drive in the last week of November that broke through the thin German defences heading for both ends of Lake Balaton. Pecs (Funfkirchen) fell on 30 November and German resistance started disintegrating, with the 44th Division's northern neighbour, 31 SS Division, retreating 'westwards'.

2nd Panzer Army, after receiving considerable reinforcements, managed to stabilise the front, anchored on Lake Balaton and forwards of Nagykanizsa, one of the last sources of oil available to Germany. By the first week in December the 44th was seen as having only limited defensive capabilities, and its fighting spirit was strongly diminished, but the now static front remained quiet for several weeks allowing the 44th division to rebuild its strength and absorb replacements.

After the failed German relief attempt of Budapest, Soviet Army forces still controlled a sizeable area on the west bank of the Danube at the confluence of the Gran, just north west of Budapest. The German command viewed this bridgehead as a major threat. To eliminate the Gran bridgehead, Army Group South would mount Operation Southwind, with the combined forces of I SS Panzer Corps and Panzer Corps Feldherrnhalle attacking. The 44 HuD, already in transit to the area would attack on the right flank, with the heavy tanks of Feldherrnhalle armoured group attached, Tiger IIs from 503rd Heavy Panzer Battalion.

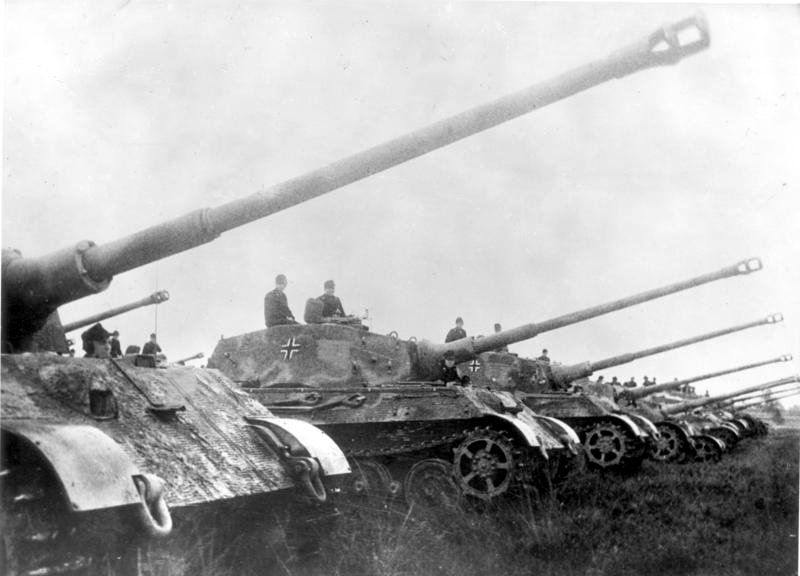
Tiger II's of s.H.Pz.Abt. 503 'Feldherrnhalle', attached to the 44th division during the elimination of the Gran bridgehead

On 17 February the attack began, and by the second day the 44 HuD had gone halfway to the Danube. In four days of fierce fighting the Soviet army bridgehead was cleared except for two villages on the west bank. The Germans reorganised their forces and the 44th Division helped the LSSAH clear the last resistance from the village of Kemet. Southwind was over and declared a success, the 44th reported the destruction of 6 tanks, the capture of 43 guns as well as much other equipment.

Army Group South now turned to new offensive plans. Ordered by Hitler to regain control of areas of central Hungary up to the Danube river, operation Operation Spring Awakening (Frühlingserwachen) aimed to recapture ground that already had seen much fighting during the Budapest relief attempts. The main thrust would occur north of Lake Balaton, conducted by 6 SS Panzer Army, with secondary thrusts to the south.

The lead up to the attack did not go smoothly, the inadequate road network, exacerbated by poor staff work, caused difficulties for the attack formations whilst forming up, 44th division units became entangled with the 9 SS Panzer Division and the II Panzer Corps started one day late.

On 7 and 8 March the Panzer divisions of I SS Panzer Corps had gone 20 miles into the Soviet Defenses but progress in the 44th sector was slow. By 13 March it had almost 500 casualties, but still lagged well behind the mobile divisions, and 3rd Ukrainian Front commander Tolbukhin began to launch a series of counter-attacks backed up by tanks.

With the German offensive all but halted, the Soviets resumed their general offensive on 16 March to the west of Budapest. Attacking across the Vertes Mountains, a sector held by relatively weak Hungarian forces, German reaction was sluggish. Hitler vetoed the transfer of 16 SS division from the 2nd Pz Army, or the 352nd Infantry Division from the 6th Pz Army to the threatened sector, Army Group South was ordered to defend 'every inch' with what it had. The Soviet forces, initially slowed as much from the difficult terrain as the opposition, emerged from the mountain passes, having pushed through the Hungarian defences and the few reserve German battalions. Their timings were good, the difficult road conditions of the earlier part of the month were improving daily as the ground started to dry out.

By 20 March the German offensive gains of Operation Spring Awakening were moot as units of the 6 SS Panzer Army were finally shifted to oppose the Soviet breakthrough, and the bulge into the Soviet lines was closing fast.

The position of the German offensive units still east of Lake Balaton was precarious. The Soviet 9th Guards Army had already covered half the distance between lakes Velence and Balaton, their only possible escape route. Another strong push by the Soviet forces and the 44 and panzer divisions of 6 Panzer Army would be trapped. The 6th Panzer Army was now struggling to keep an escape route open; the 3rd and 23rd Panzer divisions managed to retreat and were holding the Soviet forces off at Veszprem, but 1 Panzer division, 5th SS Viking and 44th were still in a box with Soviet Army forces attacking from in front and behind them.

Late on 22 March the three German divisions assembled at Jeno, a town midway between lakes Velence and Balaton and 12 km from safety. A narrow gap still existed, through which the Germans intended to break out, but the Soviet units had brought up anti-tank guns into blocking positions and could sweep the entire corridor with artillery, mortar and machine gun fire. The German units created mixed columns, with the few remaining tanks in the lead, followed by armoured infantry, the divisional commands, artillery, supply units and rearguards, with more infantry on the flanks. In the darkness the columns set off and finally reached friendly lines by dawn. Disaster had been averted but for the 44th the cost had been heavy; the division commander, van Rost, was killed along with some of his staff, when the armoured half-track he was travelling in was hit by an anti-tank shell and destroyed. Overall 65 officers from the division, had in two days fighting been killed, captured or badly injured, and the infantry had suffered severe losses overcoming the Soviet units blocking positions. Intact but badly mauled, the division retreated rapidly back towards Radkersburg on the Austrian frontier.

== War crimes ==
The division has been implicated in a number of war crimes in Italy between March and September 1944, with up to thirty-three civilians executed in each incident.

== Service and Area of Operations ==
Date	Korps	Army	Army Group	Operational Area
September 1939	XVII	14th Army	South	Krakau-Lemberg, Poland
December 1939	OKH-Reserve			Einbeck, Germany
January 1940	OKH-Reserve	6th Army	B	Einbeck, Germany
June 1940	XXXI	7th Army	B	France
July 1940	XXXI	7th Army	B	France
September 1940	XXXI	7th Army	C	France
November 1940	VI	7th Army	D	France
January 1941	VI	7th Army	D	France
March 1941	LIX	7th Army	D	France
April 1941	XVII	17th Army	B	General Government
May 1941	XVII	6th Army	A	General Government
June 1941	XVII	6th Army	South	General Government
July 1941	XXIX	6th Army	South	Zhitomir
August 1941	LV	6th Army	South	Kiev
September 1941	XVII	6th Army	South	Kiev
October 1941	LI	6th Army	South	Karkov
November 1941	LV	6th Army	South	Karkov
January 1942	LI	6th Army	South	Karkov
August 1942	LI	6th Army	B	Stalingrad
September 1942	XI	6th Army	B	Stalingrad
December 1942	VIII	6th Army	Don	Stalingrad
January 1943	VIII	6th Army	Don	Stalingrad
April 1943	in formation	15th Army	D	Belgium
June 1943	LXXXXIX	15th Army	D	Belgium
July 1943	Gruppe Feuerstein (LI. Geb. AK)		B	North Italy
August 1943	Gen.Kdo. Witthöft		B	North Italy
September 1943	II SS		B	Istria
November 1943	XIV	10. Army	C	Cassino
January 1944	XIV	10. Army	C	Cassino
May 1944	LI	10. Army	C	Cassino
October 1944	z. Vfg.	10. Army	C	Apennines
November 1944	LXXXXVII		C	Udine
December 1944	LXVIII	2. Panzer Army	F	Fünfkirchen
January 1945	LXVIII	2. Panzer Army	South	Fünfkirchen
February 1945	FH (IV)	8. Armee	South	Gran
March 1945	z. Vfg.		South	Lake Balaton
April 1945	I. Kav.	2. Panzer Army	South	Radkersburg, Graz
May 1945	XXXXIII	8. Armee	South	NW Linz

== Strength and losses ==
On 1 May 1942 the average infantry division in Army Group South was 2400 understrength and lacking about 50% of their infantry

The 132 Infantry Regiment had been particularly hard hit in the defence of the Rapido valley, and the hills behind it. Its battalions had been 'bled white' and were sometimes down to platoon strength. For example, when relieved the I/132 had only a dozen men in each company left and no company officers, the only officers in the whole battalion were the battalion commander and his adjutant. The 8/132, when relieved by a paratrooper unit on the Cassino Massif was down to only 9 men. Von Senger noted that battalions in the front line were led by very young officers commanding around 100 men.

General Clark, commander of the 5th Army claims the division was "practically eliminated", and the 5th Army records show that 1303 men were captured from the 44th Division between 16 January and the end of March, with 540 men from the 132 Infantry Regiment alone.

Although the attrition of front line infantry ate away at a division's combat strength to a point where it would be no longer effective, the overall headcount could remain little changed with over ten thousand men. The low numbers reported of German battalions often excluded service and support elements, such as supply, medical, communications and even staff troops, who served as a base, together with the few surviving combat troops around which infantry battalions could be rebuilt. As a case in point, the decimated units of 132 Infantry Regiment were withdrawn from action at the beginning of February, refreshed and the regiment was able to go back into line in March with all three battalions deployed in the new divisional sector, around the village of Terrel.

== Commanding officers ==
- Generalleutnant Albrecht Schubert (1 April 1938 – 1 October 1939)
- Generalleutnant Friedrich Siebert (1 October 1939 – 2 May 1942)
- Generalleutnant Heinrich-Anton Deboi (2 May 1942 – 29 January 1943)

After recreation:

- Generalleutnant Dr. Franz Beyer (1 March 1943 – 1 January 1944)
- Generalleutnant Dr. rer. pol. Friedrich Franek (1 January 1944 – 1 May 1944)
- Generalleutnant Bruno Ortner (1 May 1944 – 25 June 1944)
- Generalleutnant Hans-Günther von Rost (25 June 1944 – 23 March 1945)
- Oberst/Generalmajor Rudolf Langhaeuser (25 March 1945 – 8 May 1945)

== Sub Units ==
- Infantry Regiment 131
- Infantry Regiment 132
- Infantry Regiment 134
- Artillery Regiment 96
- Reconnaissance Battalion 44
- Field Replacement Battalion 44
- Anti-Tank Battalion 44 (Motorised)
- Pioneer Battalion 80
- Signals Battalion 64
- Divisional Supply Troops 44

== Bibliography ==
- Nafziger, George F. (31 March 2000). German Order of Battle: Infantry in World War II. Greenhill Books. ISBN 978-1-85367-393-1.
- Dunn, Walter Scott (February 2009). Second Front Now – 1943: An Opportunity Delayed. ISBN 978-0-8173-5547-0.
- Chapman, Guy (1969). Why France fell;: The defeat of the French Army in 1940. Holt, Rinehart and Winston. ISBN 978-0030724909.
- Kamenir, Victor (2008). The Bloody Triangle: The Defeat of Soviet Armor in the Ukraine, June 1941. Zenith Press. ISBN 978-0760334348.
- Glantz, David M. (2009). To the Gates of Stalingrad. University Press of Kansas. ISBN 978-0700616305.
- Earl F. Ziemke, & Magna E. Bauer (March 1989). Moscow to Stalingrad: Decision in the East. Hippocrene Books. ISBN 978-0880292948.
- Friedrich Dettmer, Otto Jaus, Helmut Tolkmitt (2004). Die 44. Infanterie-Division. Reichs-Grenadier-Division Hoch- und Deutschmeister 1938–1945. Nebel-Verlag. ISBN 3-89555-177-5.
- Ellis, John (2003). Cassino: The Hollow Victory – The Battle for Rome, January–June, 1944. Aurum Press Ltd. ISBN 1854109162.
- von Senger Und Etterlin, Frido (31 December 1989). Neither Fear Nor Hope. Presidio Press. ISBN 978-0891413509.
- Maier, Georg (2004). Drama Between Budapest and Vienna, the Final Fighting of the 6th Panzer-Armee. Fedorowicz (J.J.). ISBN 0921991789.

Sources

- Kesselring: An Analysis of the German Commander at Anzio – Bitner, Teddy D., CPT, USA
- Fifth Army at the Winter Line
- The Canadians in Italy, 1943–1945
