= 2nd Foreign Cavalry Regiment =

2nd Foreign Cavalry Regiment (2^{e} Régiment Étranger de Cavalerie)
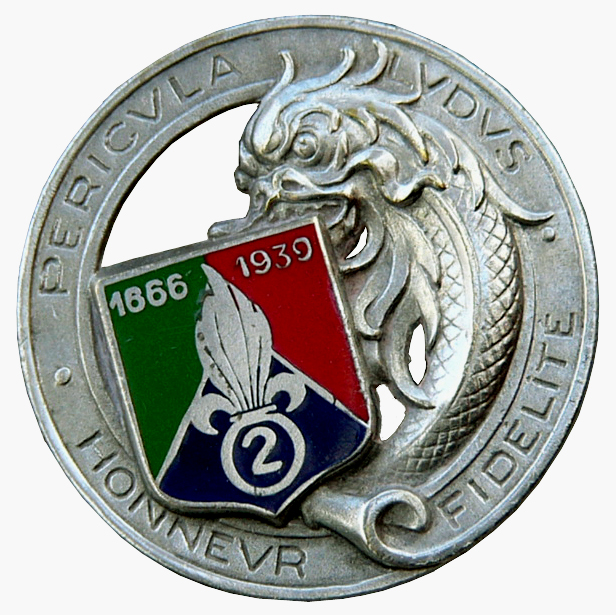
- Regimental Insignia of the 2 REC
- Active: July 1939 – January 1, 1946; November 1946 – January 1962
- Disbanded: The Regiment: Regiment 1st dissolve, January 1, 1946; Regiment 2nd dissolve, January 1962; The Regimental Colors Active: entrusted to the Foreign Legion Detachment in Mayotte (1984–present)
- Country: France
- Branch: French Army
- Type: Cavalry
- Nickname(s): Dauphin
- Motto(s): Pericula Ludus; Dangers game - for the regiment; Danger is my Pleasure
- Colors: Green & Red
- Engagements: World War II; First Indochina War; Algeria War; Suez Crisis
- Battle honours: Camerone 1863; AFN 1952-1962; Regimental Colors of the Foreign Legion Detachment in Mayotte as of 1984

The 2nd Foreign Cavalry Regiment (French: 2^{e} Régiment Étranger de Cavalerie, 2^{e} REC) was a cavalry regiment of the Foreign Legion in the French Army. the regiment was dissolved twice, in 1946 and 1962; the regimental colors have been entrusted to the Foreign Legion Detachment in Mayotte since 1984.

== History ==
=== Pre-World War II ===
The 2nd Foreign Cavalry Regiment (2^{e} R.E.C) was created in July 1939 from the squadron groups of Morocco which had been formed from the 1st Foreign Cavalry Regiment.

=== World War II ===
At the outbreak of World War II, the 2nd Foreign Cavalry Regiment was stationed in Morocco and part of it were quickly attached to the 97th Reconnaissance Group of the Infantry Division, which engaged in combat in France during the German spring offensive of 1940, and whose commander, Lieutenant-Colonel Boyer de Latour, was killed leading at the bois de Noroy on 9 July. Following the armistice, the regiment was dissolved on November 15, 1940, and the regimental colours were entrusted to the honor guard of the 1st Foreign Cavalry Regiment.

=== Indochina ===
The 2nd Foreign Cavalry Regiment was officially dissolved on June 1, 1946, at Sidi Bel Abbès, but was recreated that November, garrisoned at Oujda, where the regiment remained until 1956. The mission of the regiment was to instruct and train reinforcements destined for the 1st Foreign Cavalry Regiment in the Far East.

=== North Africa and Algerian War ===
Following the Paris accords in 1954 and the departure for Indochina in 1955, the 2nd Foreign Cavalry Regiment participated to the securing of Moroccan territories, then from 1956 maintained order in Algeria, first in the sector of Laghouat, and from 1958 along the Tunisian border. In January 1962, the 2nd Foreign Cavalry Regiment made way on Biskra, but was dissolved again following the Evian accords.

In 5 years of campaigning in Algeria, the 2nd Foreign Cavalry Regiment eliminated more than 1022 rebels and captured 697 arms, including 30 machine guns. The 2nd Squadron (2^{e} Esc) was attached to the 1st Foreign Parachute Regiment when deployed to take part in the operations of the Suez Canal Crisis.

=== Foreign Legion Detachment in Mayotte ===
In 1984, the Foreign Legion Detachment in Mayotte received the honor guard regimental colors of the 2nd Foreign Cavalry Regiment.

== Traditions ==
=== Insignias ===
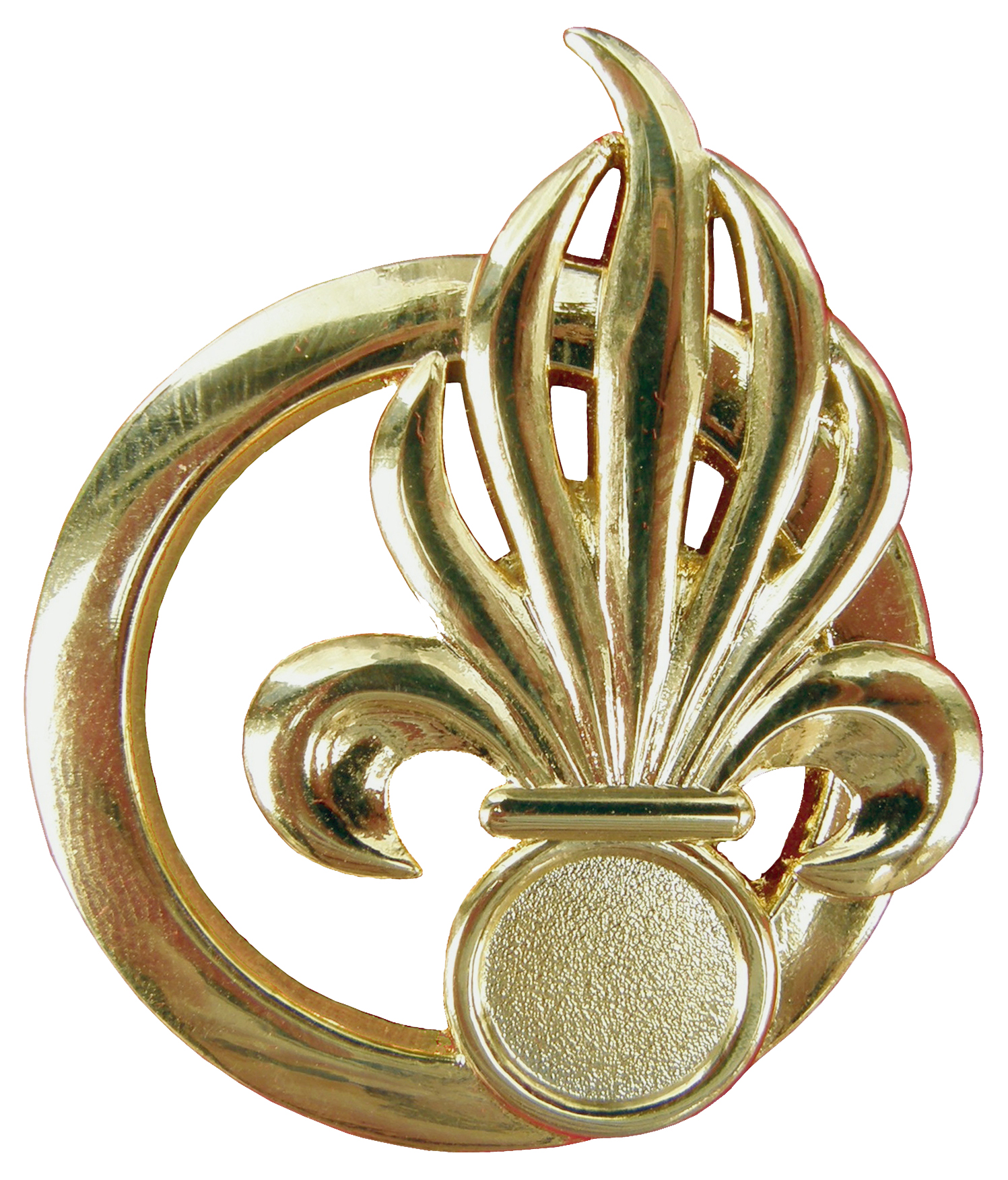
Beret Insignia of the D.L.E.M

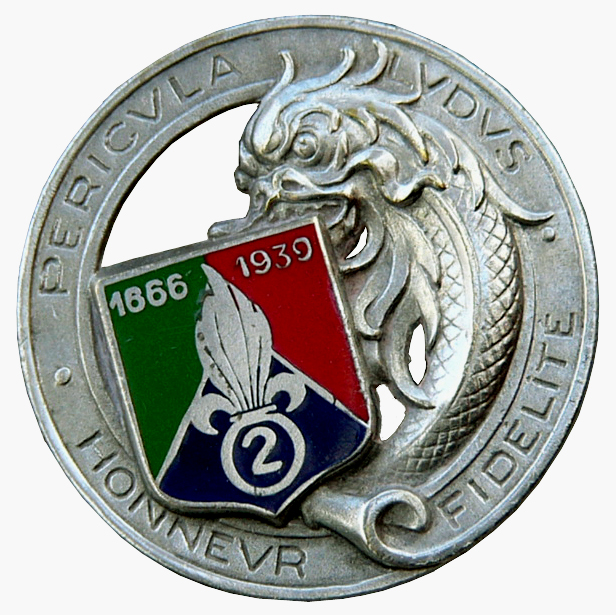
Regimental Insignia of the 2nd Foreign Cavalry Regiment, 2^{e} R.E.C

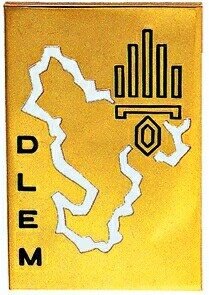
Foreign Legion Detachment in Mayotte, D.L.E.M

=== Regimental Colours ===
Regimental Colours of the 2nd Foreign Cavalry Regiment were entrusted to the Foreign Legion Detachment in Mayotte in 1984.

=== Decorations ===
Decorations of the 2nd Foreign Cavalry Regiment with cited decorations of the Foreign Legion Detachment in Mayotte as of 1984.

=== Honours ===
==== Battle honours ====
As inscribed on the regimental colors of the 2nd Foreign Cavalry Regiment:

- Camerone 1863
- AFN 1952–1962

== Regimental commanders ==
- 1939–1940 Colonel Farine
- 1940–1940 Chef d'escadrons Billon
- 1946–1948 Lieutenant colonel Lennuyeux
- 1948–1952 Lieutenant colonel de Chazelles
- 1952–1953 Lieutenant colonel Berchet
- 1953–1955 Lieutenant colonel Renucci
- 1955–1957 Lieutenant colonel Legendre
- 1957–1960 Lieutenant colonel Ogier de Baulny
- 1960–1961 Lieutenant colonel de Coatgoureden
- 1961–1962 Lieutenant colonel Baldini

|}

== See also ==
- Major (France)
- French Foreign Legion Music Band (MLE)
- Paul Gardy
- René Lennuyeux
- 1st Mounted Saharan Squadron of the Foreign Legion
- Armored Train of the Foreign Legion
- Passage Company of the Foreign Legion
- 5th Heavy Weight Transport Company
