= LXXIII Army Corps =

The LXXIII Army Corps for special deployment (German: LXXIII. Armeekorps z. b. V.) was an army corps of the German Wehrmacht during World War II.

== History ==
The LXXIII Army Corps z.b.V. was formed on 25 November 1944 in Northeast Italy. It was placed under the supervision of the 10th Army under Army Group C throughout the war. The commander of the LXXIII Army Corps throughout its lifetime was Anton Dostler. Between November 1944 and February 1945, the 114th Jäger Division (Ehlert) was part of the corps. It was the only division of the corps both in November and in February, and only briefly joined in late December and early January by the 356th Infantry Division (Kleinhenz) and the 16th SS Panzergrenadier Division Reichsführer-SS (Baum).

On 7 April 1945, the LXXIII Army Corps still served under 10th Army, along with the I Parachute Corps, the LXXVI Panzer Corps and the LXXXXVII Army Corps. By now, all major formations at the brigade and division level had been pulled away from the corps, and only minor garrison forces remained.

== Structure ==
Organizational structure of the LXXIII (73rd) Army Corps
Year	Date	Subordinate units
1944	26 November	114th Jäger
1944	31 December	114th Jäger, 356th Infantry, 16th SS Panzergrenadier
1945	19 February	114th Jäger
1945	1 March	Various minor units
1945	12 April	Various minor units

== Noteworthy individuals ==
- Anton Dostler, corps commander of LXXIII Army Corps throughout its lifetime. Executed for war crimes after Germany's surrender.
