= 57th Infantry Division (Wehrmacht) =

- 57. Infanterie-Division
- Active: 26 August 1939 – July 1944
- Country: Nazi Germany
- Branch: Army
- Type: Infantry
- Size: Division
- Engagements: World War II: Invasion of Poland; Battle of France; Operation Barbarossa; Battle of Uman; Battle of Kiev (1941); First Battle of Kharkov; Battle of Voronezh (1942); Battle of Kursk; Cherkassy Pocket; Operation Bagration; Bobruysk Offensive

Commanders
- Current commander: N/A - Division Disbanded
- Notable commanders: Oskar Blümm

The 57th Infantry Division (German: 57. Infanterie-Division) was a German division in World War II. It was formed on 26 August 1939 in Landshut.

== History ==
The 57th Infantry Division was formed in August 1939 as part of the second wave of German infantry divisions. During the German-Soviet invasion of Poland, the division remained in the Saarland.

The division was moved into Poland as an occupational force in August 1940 until the initiation of Operation Barbarossa in June 1941. The division took part in the campaign as part of Army Group South, where it assaulted Kiev.

== Orders of Battle ==
1939

- 179th Infantry Regiment
- 199th Infantry Regiment
- 217th Infantry Regiment
- 157th Artillery Regiment
- 157th Engineer Battalion
- 157th Reconnaissance Battalion
- 157th Anti-tank Detachment
- News department
- 157th Troops supply

1944

- 164th Grenadier Regiment
- 199th Grenadier Regiment
- 217th Grenadier Regiment
- 57th Fusilier Battalion
- 157th Artillery Regiment
- 157th Field-replacement Battalion
- 157th Engineer Battalion
- 157th Anti-tank detachment
- News department
- 157th Troops supply

== Commanding officers ==
- Generalleutnant Oskar Blümm, 1 September 1939 – 26 September 1941
- General der Infanterie Anton Dostler, 26 September 1941 – 10 April 1942
- Generalleutnant Oskar Blümm, 10 April 1942 – 10 October 1942
- General der Infanterie Friedrich Siebert, 10 October 1942 – 20 February 1943
- Generalleutnant Otto Fretter-Pico, 20 February 1943 – 1 September 1943
- Generalleutnant Vincenz Müller, 1 September 1943 – 19 September 1943
- Generalmajor Adolf Trowitz, 19 September 1943 – 7 July 1944
