= Oskar Blümm =

German general (1884–1951)

- Born: 26 June 1884; Zwiesel
- Died: 12 December 1951 (aged 67); Ursberg
- Military career
- Allegiance: German Empire; Weimar Republic; Nazi Germany
- Branch: Army
- Service years: 1905–1945
- Rank: Generalleutnant
- Commands: 57th Infantry Division
- Conflicts: World War I World War II
- Awards: Knight's Cross of the Iron Cross

Oskar Blümm (26 June 1884 – 12 December 1951) was a general in the Wehrmacht of Nazi Germany during World War II who commanded the 57th Infantry Division. He was a recipient of the Knight's Cross of the Iron Cross.

== Awards and decorations ==
- Knight's Cross of the Iron Cross on 23 November 1941 as Generalleutnant and commander of 57. Infanterie-Division

Military offices
Preceded by none	Commander of 57. Infanterie-Division; 1 September 1939 – 25 September 1941	Succeeded by Generalmajor Anton Dostler
Preceded by Generalmajor Anton Dostler	Commander of 57. Infanterie-Division; 10 April 1942 – 9 October 1942	Succeeded by Generalleutnant Friedrich Siebert
