= Heinrich-Anton Deboi =

German general (1893–1955)

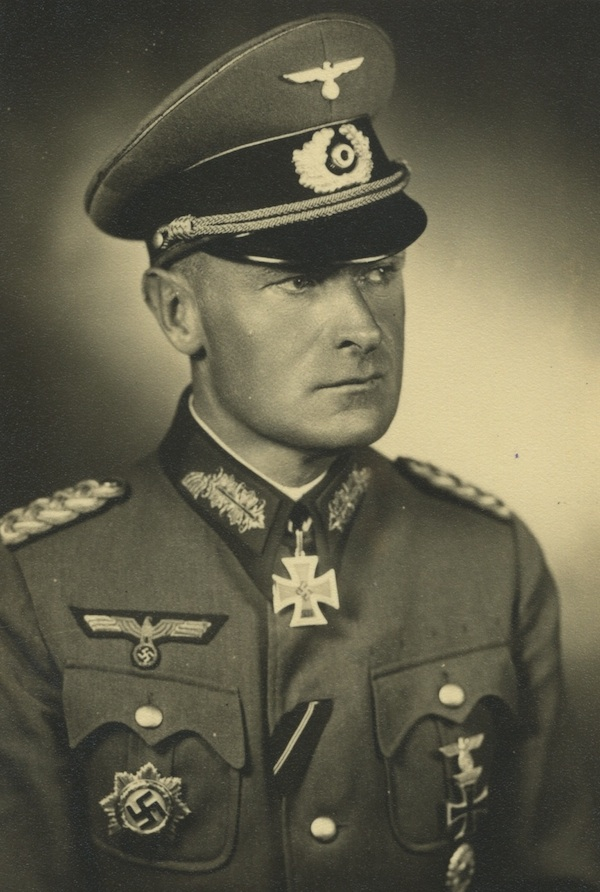
- Born: 6 April 1893; Landshut, Kingdom of Bavaria, German Empire
- Died: 20 January 1955 (aged 61); Cherntsy, Russian SSR, USSR
- Military career
- Allegiance: German Empire; Weimar Republic; Nazi Germany
- Branch: Army
- Rank: Generalleutnant
- Commands: 44th Infantry Division
- Conflicts: World War II: Battle of Stalingrad
- Awards: Knight's Cross of the Iron Cross

Heinrich-Anton Deboi (6 April 1893 – 20 January 1955) was a German general in the Wehrmacht of Nazi Germany during World War II who held several commands at the divisional levels. He was a recipient of the Knight's Cross of the Iron Cross.

Deboi surrendered to the Red Army at the conclusion of the Battle of Stalingrad in 1943. Convicted as a war criminal in the Soviet Union, he died in captivity in January 1955.

== Awards and decorations ==
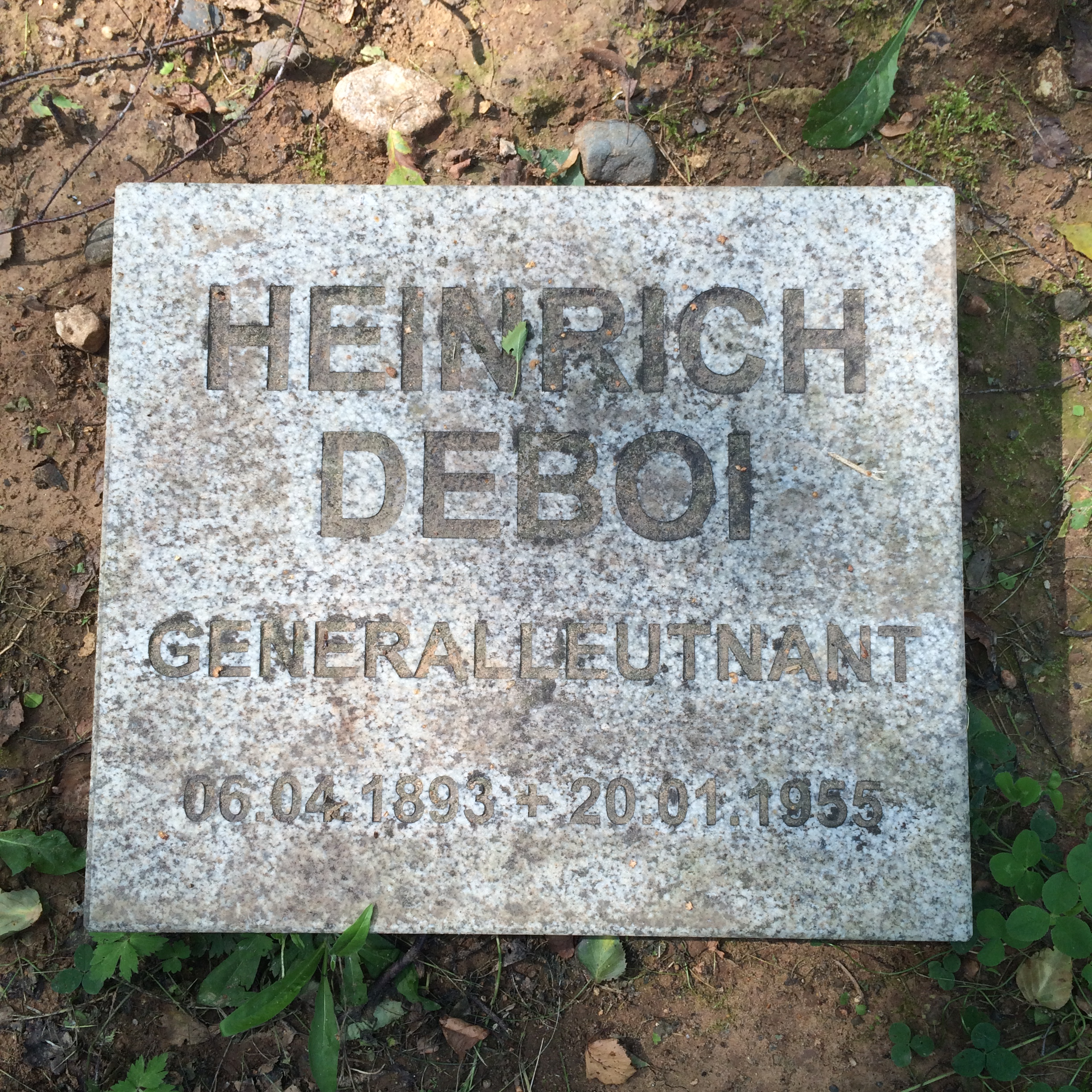

- Knight's Cross of the Iron Cross on 10 September 1942 as Generalmajor and commander of 44. Infanterie Division

Military offices
Preceded by Generalleutnant Friedrich Siebert	Commander of 44. Infanterie-Division; 2 May 1942 – 29 January 1943	Succeeded by Generalleutnant Dr. Franz Beyer
