= Friedrich Siebert =

- Born: 7 July 1888; Ludwigshafen, German Empire
- Died: 13 May 1950 (aged 61); Würzburg, West Germany
- Relatives: Ludwig Siebert
- Military career
- Allegiance: German Empire (to 1918); Weimar Republic (to 1933); Nazi Germany
- Branch: Army (Wehrmacht)
- Service years: 1907–1945
- Rank: General of the Infantry
- Commands: 44th Infantry Division; 57th Infantry Division; XIII Army Corps
- Conflicts: World War I World War II
- Awards: Knight's Cross of the Iron Cross

Friedrich Siebert (7 July 1888 – 13 May 1950) was a general in the Wehrmacht of Nazi Germany who commanded the XIII Corps during World War II. He was a recipient of the Knight's Cross of the Iron Cross. Siebert was a member of the Nazi Party.

== Awards and decorations ==
- Iron Cross (1914)
  - 2nd Class
  - 1st Class
- Iron Cross (1939)
  - 2nd Class
  - 1st Class
- German Cross in Gold (13 May 1944)
- Knight's Cross of the Iron Cross on 18 November 1941 as Generalleutnant and commander of 44. Infanterie Division

Military offices
Preceded by Generalleutnant Albrecht Schubert	Commander of 44. Infanterie-Division; 1 October 1939 – 2 May 1942	Succeeded by Generalmajor Heinrich-Anton Deboi
Preceded by Generalleutnant Oskar Blümm	Commander of 57. Infanterie-Division; 10 October 1942 – 19 February 1943	Succeeded by Generalmajor Otto Fretter-Pico
Preceded by General der Infanterie Erich Straube	Commander of XIII. Armeekorps; 20 February 1943 – 7 September 1943	Succeeded by Generalleutnant Arthur Hauffe
