= Albrecht Schubert =

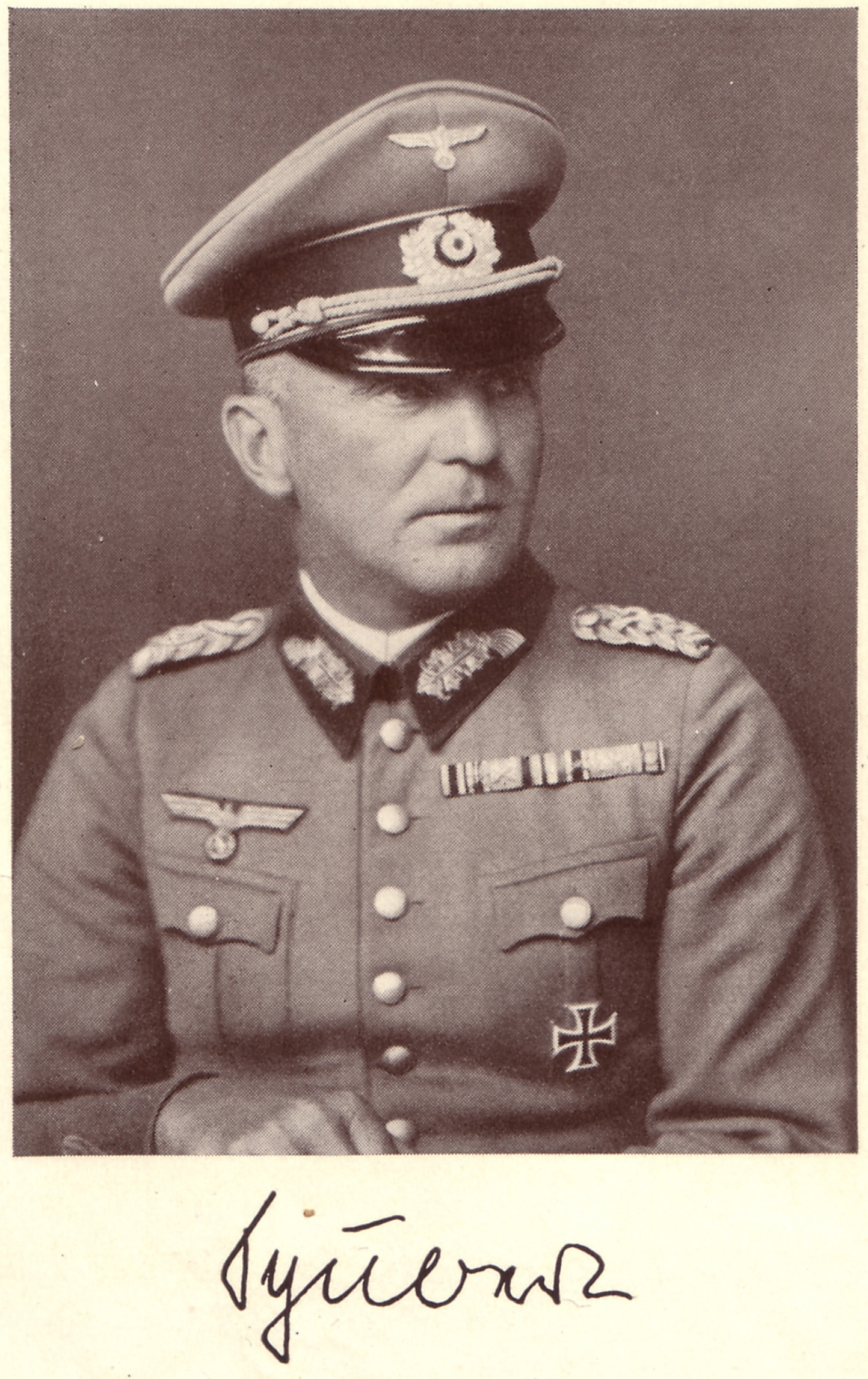
- Born: 23 June 1886; Glatz, Province of Silesia, Kingdom of Prussia, German Empire
- Died: 26 November 1966 (aged 80); Bielefeld, North Rhine-Westphalia, West Germany
- Relatives: ∞ 21 June 1913 Käthe Zimmer; 3 children
- Military career
- Allegiance: Kingdom of Prussia; German Empire; Weimar Republic; Nazi Germany
- Branch: Prussian Army; Imperial German Army; Reichsheer; German Army
- Service years: 1904–1945
- Rank: General of the Infantry
- Commands: 44th Infantry Division; XXIII Army Corps
- Conflicts: World War I World War II: Invasion of Poland; Battle of France; Operation Barbarossa; Battle of Smolensk (1941); Battle of Moscow; Battles of Rzhev
- Awards: Knight's Cross of the Iron Cross

Albrecht Ernst Eduard Max Otto Hermann Schubert (23 June 1886 – 26 November 1966) was a German general during World War II. He was a recipient of the Knight's Cross of the Iron Cross of Nazi Germany. His son Klaus Schubert (1914–1994) was an artillery officer of the Wehrmacht and Major General of the Bundeswehr.

== Life and career ==
Born 23 June 1886 in Glatz (modern Kłodzko, Poland, then in German Silesia), in a family of long Silesian ancestry. His father was Major Paul Schubert, his mother Olga Thekla, née Freiin von Reißwitz und Kadersin.

In 1904, he joined the Prussian Army and initially served with the Magdeburg-based Infantry Regiment "Prince Louis Ferdinand of Prussia" (2nd Magdeburg) No. 27. By the time of the outbreak of World War I he rose to the rank of lieutenant.

Promoted to the rank of captain in 1914, during the war he served with the Grenadier Regiment "King Frederick William II" (1st Silesian) No. 10, 21st Reserve Brigade, 4th Landwehr Division, 11th Infantry Division and as a staff officer in the 202nd Infantry Division. After the war, he served with the Freikorps "Grenzschutz Westpreußen" and then was accepted into the Reichswehr. He served in Stettin in the 2nd Division, and then in the 8th 'Prussian' Infantry Regiment. Promoted to major in 1926, to lieutenant colonel in 1931 and to full colonel in 1933. Three years later he became the commanding officer of the 12th Infantry Regiment. Following Adolf Hitler's rise to power, Schubert's career was fast-tracked. In April 1936 he was promoted to the rank of major general and already in March 1938 he became a lieutenant general. The following month he became the commanding officer of the 44th Infantry Division, with which he took part in the initial stages of World War II.

During the joint Nazi and Soviet invasion of Poland in 1939 his unit took part in the fights as part of the 14th Army. After the end of hostilities in October 1939 he was temporarily withdrawn to the personal reserve of the OKH, but was soon reinstated to active service as a provisional commanding officer of the XXIII Army Corps, with which he took part in the battle of France of 1940.

Shortly before the start of Operation Barbarossa, Schubert was promoted to the rank of General of the Infantry and his corps was relocated to East Prussia. In September 1941 he was awarded the Knight's Cross of the Iron Cross (Ritterkreuz). In May 1942 he temporarily commanded the entire 9th Army, but was again withdrawn from active service in the summer of that year. It was not until the following year that he was given the command over the Hannover-based XI Army Corps. Until the end of World War II he served on various staff positions in Vienna, away from the front.

From 9 May to 1 June 1945, after the capitulation on 8 May 1945 in the Mauerkirchen discharge camp, he was given command of the 6th Army. On 30 May and 1 June 1945, Schubert awarded five Knight's Crosses based on earlier nominations and announced promotions to members of the 1st Mountain Division: Eisgruber, Göller, Groth, Starl, and Vögtle. On 10 May 1945, the commander of the troops in the American occupation zone, General Harry John Collins, arrived in Mauerkirchen. In a speech broadcast over the camp's loudspeaker, he assured the camp inmates that they would be released as soon as enough paper could be found to print the release certificates. However, he had to admit that the administration was unable to provide food for the thousands of prisoners. The Germans were starving.

== Promotions ==
- 27 February 1904 Fähnrich (Officer Cadet)
- 27 January 1905 Leutnant (2nd Lieutenant) with Patent from 23 June 1903
- 19 June 1912 Oberleutnant (1st Lieutenant)
- 28 November 1914 Hauptmann (Captain)
- 1 February 1926 Major
- 1 February 1931 Oberstleutnant (Lieutenant Colonel)
- 1 April 1933 Oberst (Colonel)
- 20 April 1936 Generalmajor (Major General) with effect and RDA (Rank Seniority) from 1 April 1936
- 28 February 1938 Generalleutnant (Lieutenant General) with effect and RDA (Rank Seniority) from 1 March 1938
- 17 May 1940 General der Infanterie (General of the Infantry) with effect and RDA (Rank Seniority) from 1 June 1940

== Awards and decorations ==
- Iron Cross (1914), 2nd and 1st Class
  - 2nd Class on 17 September 1914
  - 1st Class on 10 April 1915
- Austro-Hungarian Military Merit Cross, 3rd Class with the War Decoration (ÖM3K) on 31 October 1914
- Saxe-Meiningen Cross for Merit in War (SMK) on 9 April 1915
- Württemberg Friedrich Order, Knight's Cross 1st Class with Swords (WF3aX) on 27 November 1915
- Hamburg Hanseatic Cross (HH) on 26 February 1917
- House Order of Hohenzollern, Knight's Cross with Swords (HOH3X) on 18 July 1918
- Honour Cross of the World War 1914/1918 with Swords on 1 January 1935
- Wehrmacht Long Service Award, 4th to 1st Class
- Anschluss Medal
- Sudetenland Medal with the “Prague Castle” clasp
- Repetition Clasp 1939 to the Iron Cross 1914, 2nd and 1st Class
  - 2nd Class on 18 September 1939
  - 1st Class on 29 September 1939
- Winter Battle in the East 1941–42 Medal
- German Cross in Gold on 20 January 1943
- Knight's Cross of the Iron Cross on 17 September 1941 as General der Infanterie and commander of XXIII. Armeekorps

== Notes ==
Military offices
Preceded by None	Commander of 44th Infantry Division; 1 April 1938 – 1 October 1939	Succeeded by Generalleutnant Friedrich Siebert
Preceded by General of the Infantry Erich Raschick	Commander of XXIII. Army Corps; 26 October 1939 – 25 July 1942	Succeeded by General of the Infantry Carl Hilpert
