= 5th Heavy Weight Transport Company (CTGP) =

5th Heavy Weight Transport Company 5^{e} Compagnie de Transport Gros Porteurs, 5^{e} CTGP
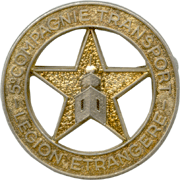
- Insignia of the 5^{e} CTGP
- Active: May 1, 1965 - July 1, 1967
- Country: France
- Branch: (France) French Army
- Type: Heavy Weight Transport
- Gold Crown, Minaret, Star: « 5^{e} COMPAGNIE TRANSPORT - LÉGION ETRANGERE »

The 5th Heavy Weight Transport Company (French: 5^{e} Compagnie de Transport Gros Porteurs, 5^{e} CTGP) was a heavy weight transport company of the Foreign Legion in the French Army. On April 30, 1964, following the dissolution of the 4th Foreign Regiment 4^{e} RE, the 6th Mounted Company of the 4th Foreign Infantry Regiment 4^{e} REI (French: 6^{e} Compagnie Portée du 4^{e} Régiment Etranger d'Infanterie, 6^{e} CP 4^{e} REI) became the 5th Mounted Company of the 2nd Foreign Regiment 2^{e} REI (French: 5^{e} Compagnie Portée du 2^{e} Régiment Etranger d'Infanterie, 5^{e} CP 2^{e} REI). On May 1, 1965, the company was designated as the 5th Heavy Weight Transport Company (French: 5^{e} Compagnie de Transport Gros Porteurs, 5^{e} CTGP). Transformed into a Military Train Unit (French: Train Militaire), the activities of the company revolved mainly, around the evacuation of the Sahara.

The 5th Heavy Weight Transport Company 5^{e} CTGP of the 2nd Foreign Infantry Regiment was divided in several platoons corresponding to the different types of vehicles and missions. The commandment, the GLR and GBO Berliet platoons were based at Reggane; the Willeme platoon at Béchar.

The vehicles of the company circulated from the confines of the in-between of the Sahara and the Mediterranean Sea, on the Mers El Kébir axis - In Amguel (French: In Amguel).

The 5th Heavy Weight Transport Company of the 2^{e} REI was dissolved on July 1, 1967, during the implantation of the regiment at Bou-Sfer.

== Insignia ==
Golden crown bearing the inscription : « 5^{e} COMPAGNIE TRANSPORT - LÉGION ETRANGERE »; in the center, a Silver Minaret (Fire Lighthouse Tower at origin, then would be found adjacent in numbers, to Mosques) (French: Minaret) centered in a five branched golden Star. Heir to the traditions of the 6th Mounted Company of the 4^{e} REI., the 5^{e} CTGP has retaken the symbols (Star and Minaret). The insignia was created for Camerone 1966, by Captain Oui, Commandant of the company.
