= 97th Infantry Division Reconnaissance Group =

Motorized cavalry unit of the French Foreign Legion

97th Reconnaissance Group of the Infantry Division
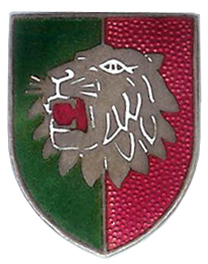
- 97th Reconnaissance Group of the Infantry Division Unit Insignia
- Active: December 1, 1939 – September 30, 1940
- Disbanded: September 30, 1940
- Country: France
- Branch: French Army
- Type: Cavalry
- Role: Reconnaissance
- Size: 630 men total
- Part of: 7th North African Infantry Division
- Engagements: World War II: Battle of France
- Battle honours: Camerone 1863

The 97th Reconnaissance Group of the Infantry Division (French: 97e groupe de reconnaissance de division d'infanterie, 97e GRDI) was a motorized cavalry unit composed of members of the French Foreign Legion which existed briefly at the beginning of the Second World War. The unit was involved in the Battle of France until France's surrender to Germany; the 97th GRDI remained intact for a few months after the surrender until it was disbanded on September 30, 1940.

== History ==
Originally established as the 180th Reconnaissance Group of the Infantry Division on December 1, 1939, at Sousse, Tunisia as part of the French military mobilization at the beginning of World War II. Formed from elements of the 1st Foreign Cavalry Regiment and the 2nd Foreign Cavalry Regiment in addition to elements drawn from the 4th Cavalry Depot of Africa (4e Dépôt de Cavalerie d'Afrique). The 180th GRDI was a part of the 180th North African Infantry Division under the command of General Rochas.

On January 2, 1940, the 97th GRDI was transferred to Pont-du-Fahs in northern Tunisia and the unit was again transferred on February 3, 1940, to Bizerte also in northern Tunisia. On February 3, Lieutenant Colonel Paul Lacombe de La Tour was placed in command of the 97th Reconnaissance Group. On March 21, 1940, the 97th GRDI arrived at Marseille and by March 24 the unit was transferred to Carcassonne where it was attached to the 16th Cavalry Division.

The 97th GRDI was sent to Camp Valdahon in Doubs on April 23, 1940, but its stay there was interrupted by the German offensive. On May 17, the 97th Reconnaissance Group moved towards Montdidier by rail and quickly thereafter found itself fighting a rear guard delaying action from May 19 to May 25. From June 5 to the 10th, the 97th Reconnaissance Group was engaged in combat as part of the French effort to defend their positions along the rivers Somme and Avre. On June 9, Lieutenant Colonel Paul Lacombe de La Tour was killed in action in the fighting around the woods around Noroy as the 97th GRDI, serving as a rear guard, attacked German panzer forces in an attempt to cover the 7th Division's retreat across the river Oise. In the assault, the 97th lost half of its fighting vehicles within minutes. The 97th then regrouped and charged again, suffering heavy casualties and losing the remainder of its vehicles to German fire.

After de la Tour's death, command of the unit was assumed by Captain de Guiraud, which he held until the French surrender. From June 11, 1940, to June 22, the 97th GRDI, now fighting largely as infantry, participated in continual delaying actions as part of the 7th North African Infantry Division along a path of retreat running from Luzarches to Saint-Jory-de-Chalais. On June 13, the 97th GRDI with the assistance of Moroccan tirailleurs, was able to prevent German forces from crossing the river Seine. On June 22, 1940, the Second Armistice at Compiègne was signed leading to a cessation of hostilities for the French. On September 7 the 97th Reconnaissance Group was repatriated back to Tunisia and by the months end the unit as a whole was disbanded. By the time of its disbandment, only 256 of the original 650 men were alive, the rest having been killed or captured.

== See also ==
- Major (France)
- French Foreign Legion Music Band (MLE)
