= 7th North African Infantry Division =

- Active: 16 March – 25 June 1940
- Country: France
- Branch: Terre
- Type: Division
- Role: Infantry
- Engagements: World War II: France 1940

The 7th Infantry Division North African ( 7 e DINA) was an infantry division of the French Army that participated in the Second World War.

== Combat history ==
The Division formed at Camp Valdahon from March 16 to April 20, 1940, as part of the General Headquarters Reserve. The 97th Reconnaissance Group was a motorized cavalry unit composed of members of the French Foreign Legion. The regiments of Tirailleurs were infantry formed from native North Africans led by French officers.

At the end of May the division was attached to the 1 Army Corps, 7 Army The 7th Army, itself newly formed, was intended fill a gap on the flank of the long German penetration, and perhaps take advantage of the apparent vulnerability of the panzer divisions, which, so far ahead of their other units might be attacked in the flank and rear. However its forces were assigned from the reserve and other areas that were some distance from the new army sector, and would take some time to arrive. The time lag was compounded by French staffs, who fearing panzer raids where units were unloading, moved retraining points 'absurd distances' from potential jump off points. The 7 na began arriving by train on 20 May, with two battalions alighting at St Just en Chausee, 40 km from Amiens, and other units even further. Its assembly was not complete until four days later, by which time the Panzers along the Somme had been replaced by Motorised Infantry, and the German marching infantry were not far behind.

On 9 June, attempting to cover the retreat of the division, the 97th Reconnaissance Group defended the village of Quesnel, and launched repeated counterattacks against German armour, but in the process lost half their vehicles and suffered serious casualties. By the end of June the unit had lost half of its officers and two thirds of its men.

By 25 June the division had suffered such high losses that it was disbanded.

== Commanders ==
- 1940: Général Barré

== Composition ==
- 97th Reconnaissance Group of the Infantry Division
- 20th Regiment of Tunisian Tirailleurs (20th RTT)
- 31st Regiment of Tirailleurs Algerians (31e RTA)
- 10th Regiment of Moroccan Tirailleurs (10th RTM)
- 81st Artillery Regiment North African (81e RANA)
- 281st Regiment Heavy Artillery (81st RAL)
