= Jean-Claude Coullon =

French army general (1929–2024)

Jean-Claude Coullon
- Born: 7 December 1929; Maves, France
- Died: 27 November 2024 (aged 94); L'Haÿ-les-Roses, France
- Military career
- Allegiance: France
- Branch: French Army; French Foreign Legion
- Service years: 1942–1990
- Rank: Général d'armée
- Commands: 13th Demi-Brigade of Foreign Legion; 13^{e} DBLE; 31st Brigade; Foreign Legion Groupment; Commandement de la Légion Étrangère
- Other work: FSALE Honorary President (1991–2001)

Jean-Claude Coullon (7 December 1929 – 27 November 2024) was a Général d'armée of the French Army and Commandant of the French Foreign Legion.

== Biography ==
As a trooper enfant (French: Enfant de troupe) in 1942, he frequented the military institutions of Billom, Autun, and Prytanée where he prepared his candidate access to the grand military institutions (French: grandes écoles militaires). He subscribed to an engagement of 8 years at the Special Military Inter-arm School (French: Ecole Special Militaire Interarmes) as of 1 October 1950. In reason of the curriculum of the époque, he was detached to the 19th Mounted Chasseurs Battalion (French: 19^{e} Bataillon de Chasseurs Portées) at Landau. He was designated as a Caporal-Chef (Senior Corporal) on 1 February 1951. On the 13, he joined Coetquidan. He was designated as a Sergent (Sergeant) on 1 April.

Coullon was nominated to the rank of Sous-lieutenant, on 1 September 1952 and joined the Infantry Application School (French: école d'application de l'infanterie) on 1 October.

As soon as he made his sortie, on 1 October 1953, he was assigned to the 3rd company of 20th Mounted Chasseur Battalion (French: 20^{e} Bataillon de Chasseurs Portées) at Tübingen at the FFA, in quality as a section (platoon) chief (French: chef de section) and an elevated platoon ranking chief student (French: Chef de peloton des élèves gradés, CPEG). Designated to Legion reinforcement for Indochina, he joined the DCLE at Sidi bel Abbes, on 22 June 1954, to embark from the camp of Nouvion, on the S/S Jamaique. Disembarked in Saigon on 7 September, the war being finished, the young officers of the Legion reinforcement were spread in various units, and Lieutenant Coullon, promoted since seven days, was assigned to the 13th company of the 4th battalion of the 5th Moroccan Tirailleurs Regiment (French: 5^{e} Regiment de Tirailleurs Marocains). The 4th battalion of the 5th Moroccan Tirailleurs Regiment (IV/5^{e} RTM) became the 2nd battalion of the 9th Moroccan Tiraillieurs Regiment (II/9^{e} RTM) on 1 October. He served in quality of section chief and adjoint (French: assistant) to the battalion chief. Repatriated with his unit to North Africa, he benefitted from a leave at the end of the campaign to count from 10 September 1955. Following the leave, he joined his unit garrisoned at El Hajeb, on 4 November, then he followed the unit to Algeria, at Mostaganem, Tebessa and Ras el Ench, as of January 1956. The 2nd battalion of the 9th Moroccan Tirailleurs Regiment was repatriated to metropolis and garrisoned at the camp de Souge in Gironde, on 11 March 1956. He assumed command of a company in March 1957. On 1 April 1958, he was assigned to the 4th mounted company (French: compagnie portée) of the 2nd Foreign Infantry Regiment 2^{e} REI in North Africa in quality as a platoon chief of AM8, then on 16 August he transferred to the 5th mounted company at Ain Sefra, to assume the functions of second officer in charge. He was cited at the orders of the division and at the orders of the armed forces. On 30 April 1959, he succeeded the command of the unit, following the death of Captain Allombert-Maréchal.

Coullon was promoted to the rank of Captain, on 1 January 1960. He was awarded two more citations, one at the order of the armed forces and the chevalier of the Legion of Honour. On 1 April 1961, he was assigned to Prtyanée Military Institution to command the services company and the 3rd student company. Admitted to the Superior War School (French: Ecole supérieur de guerre) in 1965, he wasn't retained at the admittance candidacy and prepared a license in Law by substitution. In July 1965, he joined the general staff headquarters of the commander-in-chief of the FFA at Baden Oos, where he successively served in the 3rd and 4th bureau. He was promoted to the rank of Chef de bataillon (Commandant - Major) on 1 July 1967. On 1 August 1969, he returned to the French Foreign Legion as commandant in second of the Instruction Group of the Foreign Legion GILE at the corps of the CCS at Corte in Corsica. On 1 July 1971, he joined the first regiment at Aubagne for an affectation at the GLE, in quality as a chief of the BPLE, a post which he occupied until 31 May 1973. He then joined the Directorate of Military Personnel of the French Army, as section chief of the infantry bureau, then as assistant (French: assistant) to the bureau chief. He was promoted to the rank of Lieutenant-colonel, on 1 October.

Designated to take command of the 13th Demi-Brigade of the Foreign Legion 13^{e} DBLE, he joined the territory of Afars and Issas on 4 August 1976. On the 16, he received the regimental colors of the 13^{e}. He was promoted to the rank of colonel on 1 December 1976. During his commandment time, the TFAI sees the passage to the independence and became the Republic of Djibouti in June 1977. Repatriated on 20 August 1978, at end of tour and a leave affectation of end of deployment to the 53^{e} GDSOM, he joined in November the Superior School of the French Army (French: Ecoles Supérieures de l'Armée de Terre) and the Superior War School (French: Ecole Supérieur de guerre) at Paris in quality of a group professor. On 1 September 1979, he pursued, in quality as an auditor, the 29th session of the Centre of High Military Studies (French: Centre des Hautes Etudes Militaires) and remained at the corps of CHEMM as a cadre. During that period, he participated to several study voyages: South America from 13 to 27 March 1980, in Turkey and in Yugoslavia from 11 to 22 June 1980. Recalled to the cabinet of the minister of defense (French: Cabinet du Ministre de la Défense), on 9 June 1981, as assistant chief to the chief of the military cabinet, he was designated in title for being a government missions chargé (French: chargé de mission de government) to participate from July to August 1982, to the mise en place of the 2nd Foreign Parachute Regiment 2^{e} REP through Operation Épaulard spearheaded by Lieutenant-colonel Bernard Janvier, at Beirut, Lebanon. Mission led in particular by the 2nd Foreign Parachute Regiment 2^{e} REP. He was cited at the orders of the armed forces for his action preponderant in the preparation of the deployment of the Multinational Force in Lebanon FMSB. He was nominated to the 1st section of officer generals, on 1 September 1982. He rejoined the Foreign Legion Groupment and the 31st Brigade, on 10 October, to assume command.

Designated to command the French contingent of the Multinational Security Force in Beirut, he toured in Lebanon from May to September 1983 and was awarded an ultimate citation at the orders of the armed forces.

Following, he reassumed command of his commandment post at the Foreign Legion Groupment GLE, relieved in the meantime during his mission by Colonel Forcin.

On 1 July 1984, the GLE became the Commandement de la Légion Étrangère and Général Coullon oversaw the extended prerogatives in exercising the ensemble of applicable attributions of the French Foreign Legion in principle at the title of personnel administration. In addition, Général Jean-Claude Coullon, presided over the patronization and enacting of the 6th Foreign Engineer Regiment 6^{e} REG, which became the 1st Foreign Engineer Regiment 1^{e} REG fifteen years later, on July 1.

On 1 July 1985, he was designated as Director of Personnel of the French Army. He was promoted to the rank of Général de division on 1 August 1985, then elevated to the rank and designation of Général de corps d'armée on 1 June 1987. Member of the Superior Council of the French Army from 1985 to 1988, which he would be a Legal Council Member when he left the DPMAT to take the functions of Inspector General of the French Army (IGAT), on 1 January 1989, date in which he was elevated to the rank and designation of Général d'armée.

On 8 December 1990, he was admitted to the 2nd section of officer generals.

On 11 May 1991, he was elected as President of the Federation Societies of the Veterans of the Foreign Legion, a post which he left in July 2001, however was nominated as an Honorary President. He was also nominated to the Council Administration of the Musée de l'Armée as Vice-President from 1990 to 1995, and Council President of Perfection of the ESM from 1992 to 1998. Titled of BQMS and of a DT.

Coullon died in L'Haÿ-les-Roses on 27 November 2024, at the age of 94.

== Recognitions and honours ==

- Grand Officier of the Légion d'honneur, 1989
- Croix de la Valeur militaire (4 palms, 2 stars)
- Medaille d'Outre-Mer (agrafe « Liban » (Lebanon)
- Médaille commémorative de la campagne d'Indochine
- Médaille commémorative des opérations de sécurité et de maintien de l'ordre en Afrique du Nord (agrafes « Algérie » (Algeria) and « Morocco » (Morocco))
- Commandeur of the National Order of the Cedar (Lebanon)

== See also ==
- Major (France)
- French Foreign Legion Music Band (MLE)
- Pierre Jeanpierre
- Jacques Lefort, regimental commander 2nd Foreign Parachute Regiment 2^{e} REP (1958)
- Pierre Darmuzai, 2^{e} REP (1960)
- Saharan Méharistes Companies (méharistes sahariennes)
- Paul Arnaud de Foïard, 2^{e} REP (1965)
- Jeannou Lacaze, 2^{e} REP (1967)
- Bernard Goupil, 2^{e} REP (1972)
- Jean Brette, 2^{e} REP (1974)
- Philippe Erulin, 2^{e} REP (1976)
- Jean Louis Roué, 2^{e} REP (1978)
- Raymond Le Corre
- Bruno Dary, 2^{e} REP (1994)
- Benoît Puga, 2^{e} REP (1996)
- Hervé Charpentier
- French Navy
- Édouard Guillaud
