= Jean Brette =

Jean-Louis Brette
- Born: 23 June 1929; Maizilly, France
- Died: 20 November 2018 (aged 89); Dijon, France
- Military career
- Allegiance: France
- Branch: French Army; French Foreign Legion
- Service years: 1949 – 1989
- Rank: Général de corps d'armée
- Commands: 51st Infantry Regiment; 51^{e} RI; 2nd Foreign Parachute Regiment; 2^{e} REP; 64^{e} DMT; 11th Parachute Division; 11^{e} DP; 44^{e} DMT; Deputy Chief EMA; Commander-in-chief FFA; Commander-in-chief 2nd Army Corps

Jean-Louis Brette (23 June 1929 – 20 November 2018) was a Général de corps d'armée of the French Army, who served in the French Foreign Legion and was the regimental commander of the 2nd Foreign Parachute Regiment 2^{e} REP in 1974.

== Military career ==
Jean-Louis volunteered for eight years at the title of ESMIA, he integrated the promotion "Garigliano" and joined the 5^{e} BCP in Germany on October 1, 1949. In reason of his excellent performance allure, he was nominated as a Caporal-chef (Senior Corporal) on February 1, 1950, then to the rank of Sergent (Sergeant) on April 1. Nominated to the rank of Sous-lieutenant, he joined the infantry application school on October 1, 1951. Following, he was assigned to the Legion and disembarked in North Africa in quality as a section (platoon) chief of the 1st combat company of the 1st Battalion of the 1st Foreign Regiment 1^{e} RE, On October 10, 1952. He was promoted to the rank of lieutenant on October 1, 1953. He participated to the operations of maintaining order with 2^{e} BM/1st Foreign Infantry Regiment 1^{e} REI, at Berkane in Morocco from August 19 to August 28, 1953.

Destined to serve in the Far East (French: Extrême-Orient), he disembarked in Saigon. Assigned to the 13th Demi-Brigade of the Foreign Legion 13^{e} DBLE, he served successively in the 2nd Battalion on November 17, in the 2nd company of bennes trucks (CCB) as of December 11, a unit which he received the provisionary commandment on December 25, then passed to the cannon section without recoil of the 6th company, on January 25, 1954, in quality as a section chief. He then served in the general staff headquarters of the regiment as a reconnaissance artillery officer in June before being detached to the transport group 516, in August. Hen then received the commandment of the 2nd Battalion of the CCB, on November 1. During his tour deployment, he distinguished capability on February 7, 1954, at Phu Lao and on March 25, at Xa-Dong Tang and Truc-Dong in North of Vietnam. Repatriated at the end of deployment, he disembarked in Marseille on May 27, 1955. Following his end of tour leave, he joined the 2nd battalion of the 13^{e} DBLE at Zeralda in Algeria, on August 9 to occupy the functions of ordinary officer, transmission officer and security assistant (French: adjoint) officer, a duty in assignment in which he distinguished himself Touount in the Nemencha, on February 15, 1957. He then followed the courses at the subversive war center of Philippeville.

Furthering his savoire-faire, he passed the candidacy entry at the general staff headquarters, on June 22, 1958, and served in the military institution in quality as a commandant of students company. He was promoted to the rank of Captain on April 1, 1959. He integrated the 20th promotion of the general staff headquarters in July.

Following, he was brevetted as a paratrooper, then assigned to the 2nd company of the 51st Infantry Regiment (French: 51^{e} Régiment d'Infanterie) which he received the commandment on April 13, 1960. In quality as a Recon Commando Chief (French: Chef de Commando de Chasse) or unit Commandant, he distinguished himself at mechtas Krelif, Si Halal, in the sector of Mila in December 1960, at mechta Bailloul in 1961, at mechta Sanita, at mechta El Massa in the sector of Mila in 1962.

Following the independence, he was repatriated with his unit to the camp Sissone on September 6, 1962, and followed the courses at the center of Germanic studies from October 1, 1962, until August 3, 1963. He was then assigned to the general staff headquarters of the French Forces in Germany FFA (French: Forces françaises en Allemagne) in September 1963, the integrated the 80th promotion of the Superior War School and the general staff headquarters school, on June 1, 1966. He was promoted to Chef de bataillon (Commandant - Major) on October 1. In June 1968, he was assigned to the 1st Parachute Chasseur Regiment 1^{e} RCP at Pau Idron in quality as an Instructor Director. He then served in the infantry inspection, as an officer of the general staff headquarters, from July 1, 1970. He was promoted to the rank of Lieutenant-colonel on December 1, 1972. Designated to command a troop corps, he received the regimental colors of the 2nd Foreign Parachute Regiment 2^{e} REP, on June 29, 1974. He was promoted to the rank of Colonel on October 1, 1975. During this calm operational period, he dedicated himself to decorate camp Raffali, notably by conducting a campaign of planting trees and vegetation around the regiment. In February 1976, one of his turning units at TFAI, intervened with success in the Children Hostage Rescue Affair of Loyada (French: Prise d'otages de Loyada). Following his commandment tenure, he was assigned to the general staff headquarters of the 3rd Armored Division of the French Forces in Germany, FFA (French: Forces françaises en Allemagne) at Fribourg on July 1, 1976. In 1978, he was auditor (French: auditeur) at the 28th session of the Institute of High Studies of National Defense at the Center of High Military Studies. Designated as land assistant (French: adjoint terre) of the Commandant of the 15^{e} DI and the 43^{e} DMT, he was assigned to administration at the 15^{e} RCS, on July 1, 1979. He was admitted to the 1st section of officers generals on March 1, 1980. He received the commandment of the 64^{e} DMT on August 1, 1981, then the commandment of the 11th Parachute Division 11^{e} DP and the commandment of the 44^{e} DMT on May 1, 1983. He was accordingly promoted to the rank of Général de division on November 1. He participated to two exterior assistant missions, in Lebanon from December 30, 1983, until January 5, 1984, and in Tchad from August 21 to August 29, 1984. Deputy Chief (French: Sous-Chef) of the general staff headquarters of the Armies (French: État-Major des Armées, EMA) on June 1, 1985, he was elevated to the rank designation of Général de corps d'armée on March 1, 1987. He was then nominated at the Commander-in-Chief of the French Forces in Germany, FFA (French: Forces françaises en Allemagne) and the 2nd Army Corps (French: 2^{e} Corps d'Armée) on May 13.

Attained by the age limit, he was admitted to the 2nd section of officers generals on June 24, 1989.

== Recognitions and Honors ==

- Commandeur of the Légion d'Honneur (October 1, 1986)
- Officier of the Légion d'Honneur (1977)
- Chevalier of the Légion d'Honneur (1966)
- Commandeur of Ordre national du Mérite) (July 13, 1983)
- Croix de guerre des Théatres d'Opérations Exterieures (cited at the orders of the Army Corps)
- Croix de la Valeur Militaire (3 citations, out of which one at the orders of the Army and one at the orders of the Army Corps)
- Chevalier of the Ordre du Mérite Agricole
- Médaille Coloniale (agrafe « Extrême-Orient ») - Médaille d'Outre-Mer (agrafe « Liban » (Lebanon), agrafe « Tchad»)
- Médaille commémorative de la campagne d'Indochine
- Médaille commémorative des opérations de sécurité et de maintien de l'ordre en Afrique du Nord (agrafes « Algérie » )
- Authorized to wear the insignia of the Commandeur de l'ordre national du Merite de la Republique Gabonasie ( Commander degree of the National Order Merit of Gabon - February 6, 1987).

== See also ==
- Pierre Jeanpierre
- Jacques Lefort, 2^{e} REP (1958)
- Pierre Darmuzai, 2^{e} REP (1960)
- Saharan Méharistes Companies (méharistes sahariennes)
- Paul Arnaud de Foïard, 2^{e} REP (1965)
- Jeannou Lacaze, 2^{e} REP (1967)
- Bernard Goupil, 2^{e} REP (1972)
- Philippe Erulin, 2^{e} REP (1976)
- Jean Louis Roué, 2^{e} REP (1978)
- Jean-Claude Coullon
- Bernard Janvier, 2^{e} REP (1982)
- Bruno Dary, 2^{e} REP (1994)
- Benoît Puga, 2^{e} REP (1996)
- Hervé Charpentier
