= Jean Louis Roué =

Jean Louis Roué
- Born: January 8, 1933; France
- Died: January 20, 2011 (aged 78)
- Military career
- Allegiance: France
- Branch: French Army
- Service years: 1953 – 1993
- Rank: Général de corps d’armée
- Commands: 2nd Foreign Parachute Regiment; 2^{ème} REP; Chief of French elements UNIFIL Commandement de la Légion Étrangère

Jean Louis Roué was a Général de corps d’armée of the French Army and Commandant of the Foreign Legion.

== Military career ==
Called up to serve his military obligations, he was assigned to the 71st Infantry Battalion (French: 71^{e} Bataillon d'Infanterie) on November 3, 1953, where he was nominated as a Caporal (Corporal), on April 16, 1954, and was promoted to Caporal-chef (Senior Corporal) on May 1.

Selected to become an officer, he was sent to the infantry application school on May 7 in quality of a reserve officer student. He was promoted to the rank of Sergent (Sergeant) on August 1, 1954.

He joined the 12th company of the 3rd battalion of the 51st Infantry Regiment (French: 51^{e} Régiment d'Infanterie) in Tunisia with the rank of reserve Aspirant on November 1 of the same year. He was nominated as reserve Sous-lieutenant on May 1, 1955. It was with this rank that he was assigned to the 57th Infantry Regiment (French: 57^{e} Régiment d'Infanterie) on August 31, 1956, after being cited on July 28 for his action throughout the course of an operation in the forest of Mouias in the department of Constantine.

Having made his engagements, he was presented to the 20th preparatory platoon series at the entry of ESMIA of Strasbourg on October 1, 1956. Successful, he subscribed to an engagement with the active rank of Sergent, from the same date. One year later, he integrated the ESMIA Coetquidan. Nominated to Sous-lieutenant on October 1, 1958, he was assigned to the 71st Infantry Regiment (French: 71^{e} Régiment d'Infanterie) and detached to the Polytechnic School of Dinan in quality as an Instructor.

On December 1, he passed to the EAI. Following, he was assigned to the Legion and joined the CPCIP of the GILE, a unit of the 1st Foreign Regiment 1^{e} RE, Saida on November 27, 1959. Section platoon chief (French: chef de section) of grenadiers-voltigeurs, he contributed to the operational successes won by the principal regiment in the massif of Ahmar-Kraddou in the sector of Arris in the Zone South Constantinois in October 1960 and in March 1961 as well throughout the course of operations led in October 1961 in the Beni-Sbihi of Collo sector in Zone North Constantinois.

On October 1, 1960, he was assigned to the 2ème REP at Philippeville and was promoted to the rank of Lieutenant, on the same date. In January 1962, he joined the 6th company of the 5th Moroccan Tirailleurs Regiment (French: 5^{e} Régiment de Tirailleurs Marocains) at Dijon in quality of a section chief then commandant of elementary unit. On June 1, 1963, he joined the 2ème REP at Bou Sfer and was promoted to the rank of Captain on January 1, 1964.

He conducted a TAP officer candidacy and received the Para Instructor (French: moniteur) Brevet.

His professional cursus brought him to the 27th promotion of the school of the general staff headquarter on February 1, 1965, then joined the 42 Infantry Regiment (French: 42^{e} Régiment d'Infanterie) at Radolpzell at the corps of the French Forces in Germany FFA, where he commanded a unit starting August 1. Returned to France, he was assigned as an assistant (French: adjoint) to the chief of the 2nd bureau, at the general staff headquarters of the 3rd Military Region at Rennes on September 5, 1967. Assigned on August 5, 1968, he was designated as a reserve instructor section chief of the 14th Divisionary Company of the 44th Military Division at Toulouse, then passed to the Technical and Instruction Arms Directorate in July 1970, as a section chief of technical studies.

He was promoted to the rank of Chef de bataillon (Commandant - Major), on October 1, 1971. He entered as a candidate at the 86th promotion of the Superior War School and the school of general staff headquarters on September 1, 1972.

He went back to the 2nd Foreign Parachute Regiment 2^{e} REP, on August 1, 1974, and was assigned to the post of Director of operations and instruction bureau.

He joined the Inspection of the Infantry, two years later. He was promoted to the rank of Lieutenant-colonel on October 1, 1976.

Designated to take a commandment post, he received the regimental colors of the 2ème REP on July 24, 1978. He was promoted to the rank of Colonel on October 1, 1979.

Designated to assume the head of the Infantry Bureau of the Directorate of Military Personnel of the French Army, he joined the post on July 29, 1980.

During the crisis of Lebanon, he commanded in second then became the Chief of the French elements of general staff headquarters of the United Nations Interim Force in Lebanon UNIFIL on June 25, 1983. He was cited for his action in this post.

He was admitted to the 1st section of officer generals on May 1, 1984, date in which he joined the general staff headquarters of the French Army EMAT to assume the functions of the cabinet chief of the Chief of Staff of the French Army CEMAT on July 1.

On July 1, 1985, he assumed the command tenure of the Foreign Legion. He was promoted to the rank of Général de division on April 1, 1987. Two years later, he was the assistant general of the Military governor of Paris.

In 1989, he was designated as Director of Military Personnel of the French Army, and was elevated to the rank designation of Général de corps d’armée, on October 1, 1989.

He was admitted to the second section of officers generals in 1993.

Jean Louis Roué died on January 20, 2011.

== Recognitions and Honors ==

- Commandeur of the Légion d'Honneur
- Officier of the Légion d'Honneur (1985)
- Chevalier of the Légion d'Honneur (1972)
- Commandeur of the Ordre national du Mérite
- Officer of the Ordre national du Mérite (1985)
- Croix de la Valeur militaire (3 citations)
- Medaille d'Outre-Mer (agrafe « Liban » (Lebanon))
- Médaille commémorative des opérations de sécurité et de maintien de l'ordre en Afrique du Nord (agrafes « Algérie » (Algeria) and « Tunisie » (Tunisia))
- Médaille de la Jeunesse et des Sports de 1976 (Youth and Sports Medal of 1976)
- Médaille Chevalier de l'ordre du Mérite de security national de l'ONU ( Authorized to wear the Knight Order Medal of the National Security of the United Nations since 1985 )

== See also ==
- Major (France)
- French Foreign Legion Music Band (MLE)
- Pierre Jeanpierre
- Jacques Lefort, regimental commander 2nd Foreign Parachute Regiment 2^{e} REP (1958)
- Pierre Darmuzai, 2^{e} REP (1960)
- Saharan Méharistes Companies (méharistes sahariennes)
- Paul Arnaud de Foïard, 2^{e} REP (1965)
- Jeannou Lacaze, 2^{e} REP (1967)
- Bernard Goupil, 2^{e} REP (1972)
- Jean Brette, 2^{e} REP (1974)
- Philippe Erulin, 2^{e} REP (1976)
- Bernard Janvier, 2^{e} REP (1982)
- Bruno Dary, 2^{e} REP (1994)
- Benoît Puga, 2^{e} REP (1996)
- French Navy
- Édouard Guillaud
- Hervé Charpentier
