= Bernard Goupil =

French commandant

Personal details
- Born: 16 January 1925 Paris, France
- Died: 3 April 2013 (aged 88)
- Education: École spéciale militaire

Military service
- Allegiance: (France) French Republic
- Branch/service: French Army: Infantry; Foreign Legion
- Years of service: 1946 – 1985
- Rank: Général d'armée
- Unit: 2nd Foreign Parachute Regiment
- Commands: Cabinet chief of the 1st Army Corps; 2nd Foreign Parachute Regiment; Foreign Legion Groupment
- Battles/wars: First Indochina War

Bernard Goupil (1925 – 2013) was a Général de division of the French Army and Commandant of the Foreign Legion.

== Military career ==
On October 1, 1946, he was admitted to the selection entry of Saint-Cyr and subscribed an engagement at the title of the EMIA and joined the 152nd Infantry Battalion (French: 152^{e} Bataillon d’Infanterie, 15^{e} BI) at Mutzig in quality of an instructor candidate. He was promoted to Caporal-chef (Senior Corporal) on February 6, 1947, date in which he joined the 31st Chasseur Battalion à Pied (French: 31^{e} Bataillon de Chasseurs à Pied, 31^{e} BCP).

He was promoted to the rank of Sergent (Sergeant) on May 1, and on the 8, he passed to the 4th Chasseur Battalion à Pied (French: 4^{e} Bataillon de Chasseurs à Pied, 4^{e} BCP) where he followed the 9th course series of the ESMIA. On April 16, 1948, he passed to the 29th Chasseur Battalion à Pied (French: 29^{e} Bataillon de Chasseurs à Pied, 29^{e} BCP) at Coulommiers, however, remained attached to the ESMIA.

He integrated the promotion of « Général Philippe Leclerc de Hauteclocque » (1946–1948) on June 1, the rejoined the EAI at Auvours, on October 1.

He was promoted to the rank of Sous-lieutenant before heading to Coetquidan on October 31. He was detached to the 4th Infantry Regiment from January 5 to February 5, 1949. After his leave in application, he was assigned to the 1st battalion of the 1st Foreign Infantry Regiment 1^{e} REI at Saida on June 18. Designated in reinforcement « Extrême-Orient », he disembarked at Saigon on April 19, 1950, to be assigned to the 14th company of the IV/2nd Foreign Infantry Regiment 2^{e} REI. He passed to the 16th company on May 1. He was promoted accordingly to the rank of Lieutenant on October 1.

=== 1950s ===
On January 22, 1951, he was assigned to the 3rd company of the marching battalion of the 1st Foreign Infantry Regiment 1^{er} REI. Thus unit became the 11th company of the III/1^{er} REI on March 1. During his séjour, he combat engaged at Ben Tam, April 4 and 5 1951; at Vu Nong, on October 27 where was wounded twice by bullets; at Phu Yen, on January 14, 1952. He received 3 citations with attribution of the Croix de Guerre des Théâtres d’Opérations Extérieures, with one at the orders of the armed forces. Towards the end of the deployment, he disembarked in Marseille and received an assignment at the regional administrative company for his tenure at the end of campaign deployment, in October 1952. He served then at the 1st Foreign Regiment 1^{e} RE in quality as a platoon chief of élève gradé, from February 16, 1953. Again reassigned to the Extrême-Orient, he disembarked at Saigon, on July 18, 1954, and rejoined the 3rd Foreign Infantry Regiment 3^{e} REI. Repatriated with his unit, he disembarked at Bône. He assumed command of the 8th company of the II/3^{e} REI stationed in the Aurès, on December 16.

He was promoted to the rank of Captain in July 1956. On January 1, 1957, he became the chief of the 2nd bureau of the 1^{er} RE. Then in 1958, he integrated the general staff headquarters school (French: l’Ecole d’état-major) and conducted his qualification at Philippeville. Returned to the 1^{e} RE, he assumed the officer function of psychological action of urban sous-sector of Sidi bel Abbès, starting February 1, 1959. He was cited twice with attribution of the Croix de la Valeur militaire. On July 1, he was a selected candidate at the 20th promotion of the general staff headquarters (French: 20^{e} promotion de l’Ecole d’état-major).

=== 1960s ===
On March 10, 1960, he was assigned to the command of the 2nd company of the 121st Infantry Regiment in Algeria. He was slightly wounded on October 14, 1960, in Grande Kabylie. He was cited at the orders of the armed forces for his decisive action. On May 8, 1961, he was assigned to the inter-arm bureau of the 11th Light Infantry Division (French: 11^{e} Division Légère d’Infanterie, 11^{e} DLI). The 11^{e} DLI rejoined the metropolis at Nancy. He was promoted to the rank of Chef de bataillon (Commandant - Major) on April 1, 1963. He was made chevalier of the Légion d’honneur on August 26, 1963, for exceptional war service in the Extrême-Orient (French: « Pour services exceptionnels de guerre en Extrême-Orient »). The 11th Light Infantry Division became the 11th Division of December 1.

On April 6, 1965, he was assigned to the 2nd Foreign Parachute Regiment 2^{e} REP at Bou Sfer, ion quality of instructor chief of the operation bureau. On August 1, 1967, he commanded the Qualification Group of Sous-Officiers (NCO) at the Infantry Application School (French: groupe de qualification des sous-officiers à l’Ecole d’application de l’infanterie) at Montpellier. He was promoted to the rank of Lieutenant-colonel on July 1, 1969. Nominated as chief of the cabinet of the commandant général of the 1st Army Corps (French: Chef de cabinet du général commandant le 1^{er} Corps d’Armée), he was assigned for administration at the 101st squadron of QG at Nancy on October 1.

=== Later life ===
On February 15, 1972, he assumed the functions of Chief cabinet of the Military Governor of Metz and Commandant of the 6^{e} RM. On August 8, 1972, he received the regimental command of the 2nd Foreign Parachute Regiment 2^{e} REP at Calvi. He was promoted to the rank of Colonel on October 1, 1973. Following this command tenure, he became the Inspector General of general staff headquarters of the French Army (French: Chef d’état-major de l’inspection général de l’Armée de Terre) on August 12, 1974.

He rejoined the 28th session at IHEDN and the 25th sessions of the CHEMM, on September 1, 1975, in quality of an auditor. On August 1, 1976, he was assigned to the 1st Foreign Regiment 1^{e} RE for administration and became the Commandant of the Foreign Legion Groupment on October 29. He was nominated to the 1st section of officer generals on December 1, 1978. In October 1980, he rejoined the EMAT in quality of mission delegate near the Chief of Staff of the French Army CEMAT, then Chief of the Cabinet. On October 1, 1982, he was elevated to the dignity of Général de division and received the functions of Governor of Marseille on January 16. He was admitted to the second section of officer generals, by reaching the age limit, on January 17, 1985.

Général de division Bernard Goupil died on April 3, 2013.

== Honours and decorations ==
=== National honours ===
Ribbon bar	Honour
	Grand Officer of the National Order of the Legion of Honour
	Grand Cross of the National Order of Merit

=== Military decorations ===
Ribbon bar	Honour
	War Cross for foreign operational theatres - Three citations
	Cross for Military Valour - Three citations
	Overseas Medal - Clasp Extrême-Orient
	Indochina Campaign Commemorative Medal
	North Africa Security and Order Operations Commemorative Medal - One citation
	Medal for the War Wounded - Wounded three times

== See also ==
- Major (France)
- French Foreign Legion Music Band (MLE)
- Jacques Lefort, regimental commander 2nd Foreign Parachute Regiment 2^{e} REP (1958)
- Pierre Darmuzai, 2^{e} REP (1960)
- Saharan Méharistes Companies (méharistes sahariennes)
- Paul Arnaud de Foïard, 2^{e} REP (1965)
- Jeannou Lacaze, 2^{e} REP (1967)
- Jean Brette, 2^{e} REP (1974)
- Philippe Erulin, 2^{e} REP (1976)
- Jean Louis Roué, 2^{e} REP (1978)
- Bernard Janvier, 2^{e} REP (1982)
- Bruno Dary, 2^{e} REP (1994)
- Benoît Puga, 2^{e} REP (1996)

== Sources ==
- Répertoire des chefs de corps
- Centre de documentation de la Légion étrangère
- Répertoire des citations (BCAAM)
