= 3rd Foreign Parachute Regiment =

- 3^{e} Régiment Étranger de Parachutistes
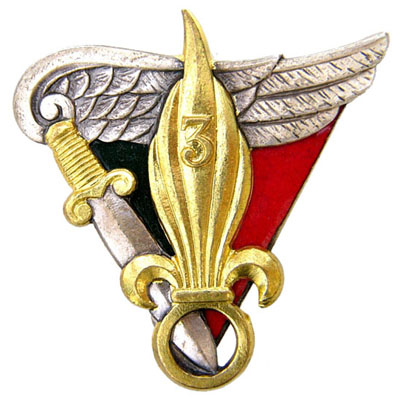
- Regiment Insignia
- Active: September 1, 1955 – December 1, 1955
- Disbanded: December 1, 1955
- Country: France
- Branch: French Army
- Type: Airborne forces
- Part of: 3^{e} B.E.P I Formation, 1949; 3^{e} B.E.P II Formation, 1951; 3^{e} B.E.P III Formation, 1954; 3^{e} B.E.P IV Formation, 1954; 3^{e} R.E.P, 1955; 2^{e} R.E.P from 3^{e} R.E.P and 2^{e} B.E.P Merger
- Garrison/HQ: Batna; Philippeville

Insignia
- Abbreviation: 3^{e} REP

The 3rd Foreign Parachute Regiment (French: 3^{e} Régiment Étranger de Parachutistes, 3^{e} R.E.P) was a parachute regiment of the Foreign Legion in the French Army and previous 3rd Foreign Parachute Battalion, (3^{e} BEP) from September 1, 1955, to December 1, 1955.

Based at Batna, the regiment becomes operational but then is dissolved on December 1, 1955; the legionnaires constituting the regiment are merged with the 2^{e} BEP to form a new unit, the 2^{e} REP.

== Insignias ==
The insignia of the Foreign Legion Paratroopers of France represents a closed "winged armed dextrochere", meaning a "right winged arm" armed with a sword pointing upwards. The Insignia makes reference to the Patron of Paratroopers. In fact, the Insignia represents "the right Arm of Saint Michael", the Archangel which according to Liturgy is the "Armed Arm of God". This Insignia is the symbol of righteous combat and fidelity to superior missions.

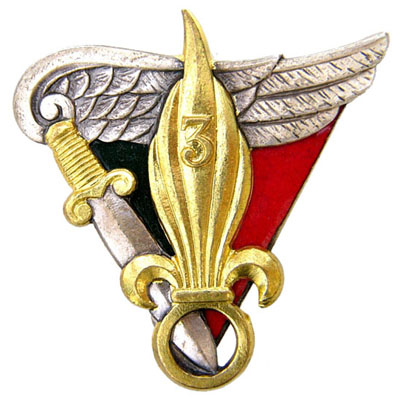
3^{e} B.E.P then 3^{e} R.E.P Insignia

== Regimental Commanders ==
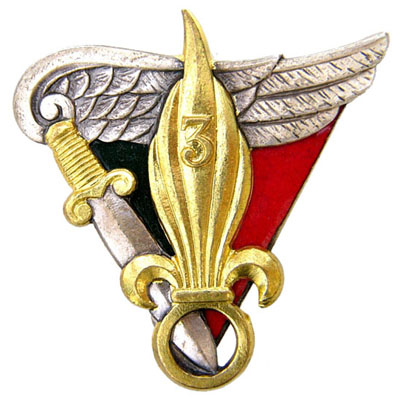
3^{e} Regiment Etranger de Parachutistes 3^{e} REP Tenure ( September 1, 1955- December 1, 1955 )

- September 1, 1955 - December 1, 1955 : captain Pierre Darmuzai

== Notable Officers and Legionnaires ==
- Paul Arnaud de Foïard
- Pierre Jeanpierre
- Hélie de Saint Marc
