= 2nd Foreign Parachute Regiment =

Coordinates: 42.5536°N 8.8006°E

- 2e Régiment Étranger de Parachutistes
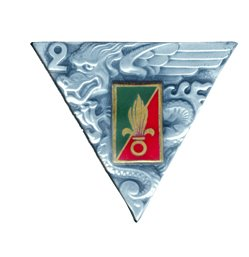
- Regimental Badge
- Active: 2nd Foreign Parachute Battalion; 1948–1955; 2nd Foreign Parachute Regiment; 1 December 1955 – present
- Country: France
- Branch: French Army
- Type: Paratrooper; Airborne Light Infantry
- Role: Primary tasks: Airborne warfare; Special Reconnaissance; Raids; CQB; Specialised roles: Urban Warfare (1st CIE); Mountain warfare (2nd CIE); Amphibious warfare (3rd CIE); Sniping and demolitions (4th CIE); Desert warfare (5th CIE); Groupement Commando de Parachutistes(CA)
- Size: ~ 1,310
- Part of: 11th Parachute Brigade; Commando Parachute Group
- Garrison/HQ: Calvi, Corsica, France
- Mottos: More Majorum; à la manière de nos Anciens (fr) (in the manner, ways and traditions of our veterans foreign regiments)
- Colour of Beret: Green
- March: La Légion Marche (The Legion Marches)
- Anniversaries: Camerone Day (30 April), Saint-Michael Day (29 September)
- Engagements: First Indochina War: Battle of Route Coloniale 4; Battle of Hòa Bình; Battle of Nà Sản; Battle of Dien Bien Phu; Algerian War; Shaba II 1978: Battle of Kolwezi 1978; Lebanese Civil War 1975–1990: Operation Épaulard I 1982; Multinational Force in Lebanon 1982–1984; Kuwait 1990–1991; Kosovo; Ivory Coast; War on terror (2001–present): Afghan conflict; Operation Enduring Freedom; Afghanistan; Northern Mali conflict

Commanders
- Current commander: Colonel De La Chappelle
- Notable commanders: Rémy Raffalli; Jacques Lefort; Pierre Darmuzai; Paul Arnaud de FaradDa; Jeannou Lacaze; Bernard Goupil; Jean Brette; Philippe Erulin; Jean Louis Roué; Bernard Janvier; Bruno Dary; Benoît Puga; Alain Bouquin; Éric Bellot des Minières; Paulo Dameto

The 2nd Foreign Parachute Regiment (French: 2e Régiment étranger de parachutistes, 2e REP) is the only airborne regiment of the Foreign Legion in the French Army. It is one of the four infantry regiments of the 11th Parachute Brigade and part of the spearhead of the French rapid reaction force.

Since the regiment's arrival from Algeria in 1967, it has been stationed at Camp Raffalli near the town of Calvi on the island of Corsica, south of mainland France. The regiment is also equipped with Véhicule de l'Avant Blindé.

== History ==
Descended from the 2nd Foreign Parachute Battalion which served in Indochina, it fought in Algeria, and more recently in Kolwezi (Zaïre) during the Battle of Kolwezi in 1978. Having participated in all French exterior operations since 1970, the regiment has operated in Chad, Lebanon, and the former Yugoslavia since 1992, at Djibouti, Rwanda, in Central Africa and even Gabon. In 1997, the regiment was engaged in the Congo-Brazzaville during Operation Pelican (French: Opération Pélican). From 2002 to 2003, at the beginning of Opération Licorne, the regiment was engaged in the Ivory Coast. More recently in 2010, the regiment fought in Afghan theatre as part of the Brigade La Fayette (or Task Force La Fayette) as GTIA Surobi, code Battle Group Altor.

The Parachute Company of the 3rd Foreign Infantry Regiment was created on April 1, 1948. The command of the company was given to a 23-year-old Lieutenant, Jacques Morin. He commanded the company from April 31, 1948, to May 31, 1949. Volunteers filled in the ranks from the foreign regiments present already in Indochina. Part of the 3rd Foreign Infantry Regiment, the parachute company operated under different battalions. Following a series of combat action operations in the most exposed sectors of the high regions and airborne operations in the Delta, the company was dissolved on May 31, 1949. At the time the company disbanded, it comprised three Legion officers, 14 Sous-officiers, and 92 corporals and legionnaires, all of whom were transferred to the 1st Foreign Parachute Battalion which had just disembarked in Indochina.

=== 3rd Foreign Parachute Battalion (1948–1955) ===
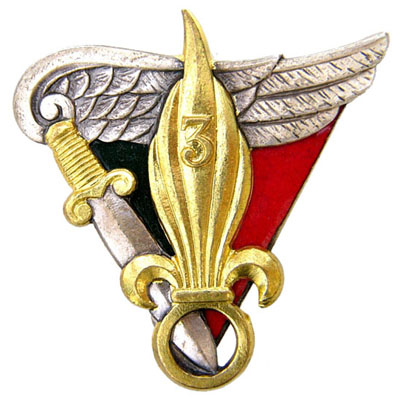

The 3rd Foreign Parachute Battalion (3e BEP) was created in April 1949 at Mascara. The 7th combat company of paratrooper training of the 1st Foreign rejoined Sétif 7 months later, starting November 15, 1949, becoming officially the 3rd Foreign Parachute Battalion. The mission of the 3e B.E.P was to instruct the legionnaires destined to relieve the 1st and 2nd Foreign Parachute Battalions. It also participated in operations to maintain order in Tunisia from January to June 1952.

On May 4, 1954, as the Battle of Dien Bien Phu was underway, the battalion began travelling to Indochina. On May 25, 1954, the battalion was at Haïphong. On June 1, the men forming the 3e B.E.P were transferred to the 2nd Foreign Parachute Battalion as the 2 BEP was reconstituted. The 3rd Foreign Parachute Battalion merged with the injured of annihilated foreign battalions while in the meantime, owing to numerous volunteers, the 3e B.E.P. was seen reconstituted at Sétif. Back to Algeria, the three foreign paratrooper battalions (the 1st Foreign Parachute Battalion, 2nd Foreign Parachute Battalion, 3rd Foreign Parachute Battalion) would be seen filling the ranks of the foreign paratrooper regiment. On September 1, 1955, the 3e B.E.P. became the 3rd Foreign Parachute Regiment (3e REP). Based at Batna, the regiment became operational but then was dissolved on December 1, 1955; the men constituting the regiment were merged with the 2nd Foreign Parachute Battalion to form a new unit, the 2nd Foreign Parachute Regiment.

The insignia of the 3rd Foreign Parachute Battalion was created in 1950 by Captain Pierre Darmuzai, the battalion commander (Chef de Bataillon).

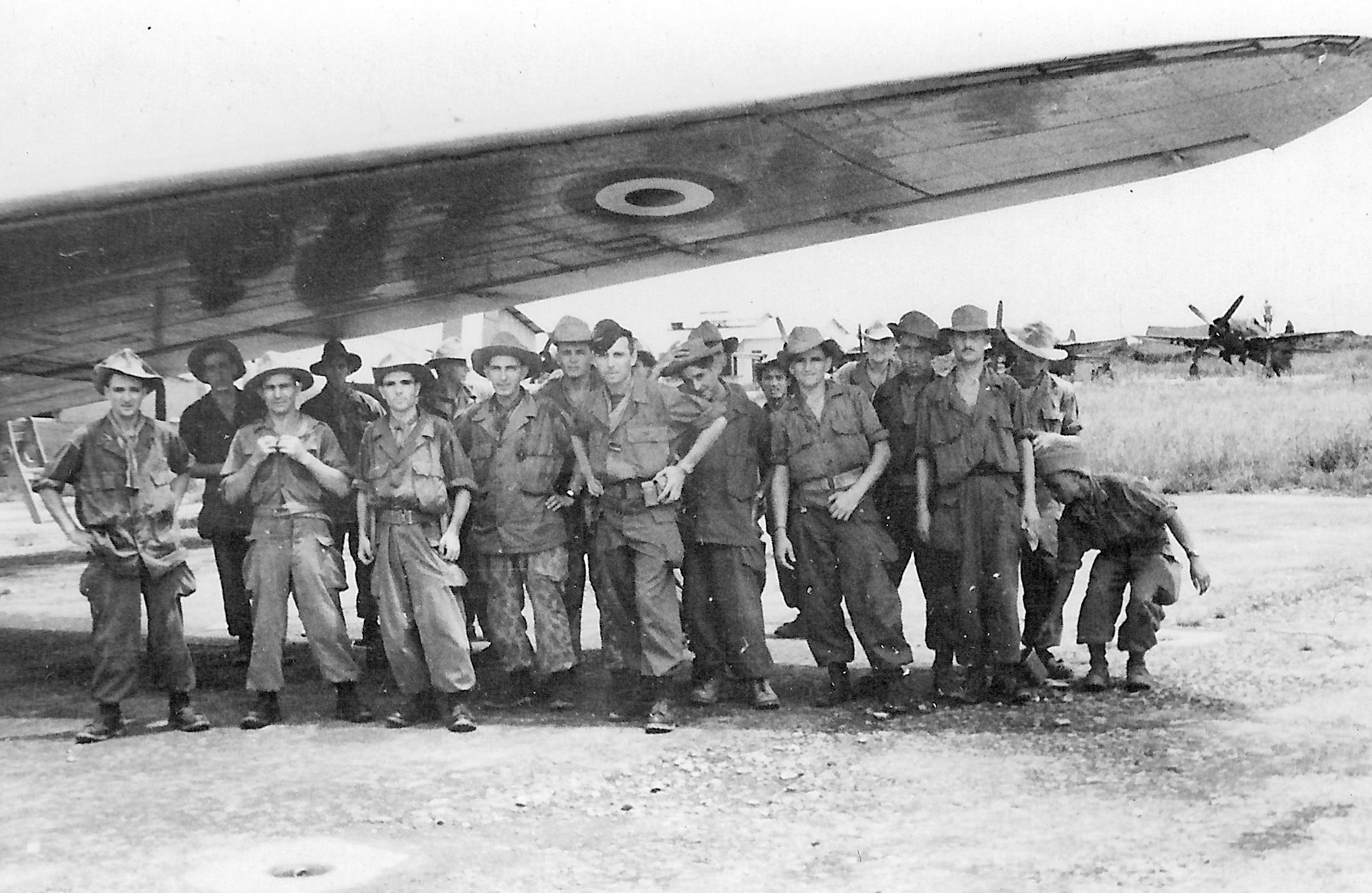
Elements of the 2nd Foreign Parachute Battalion during the First Indochina War.

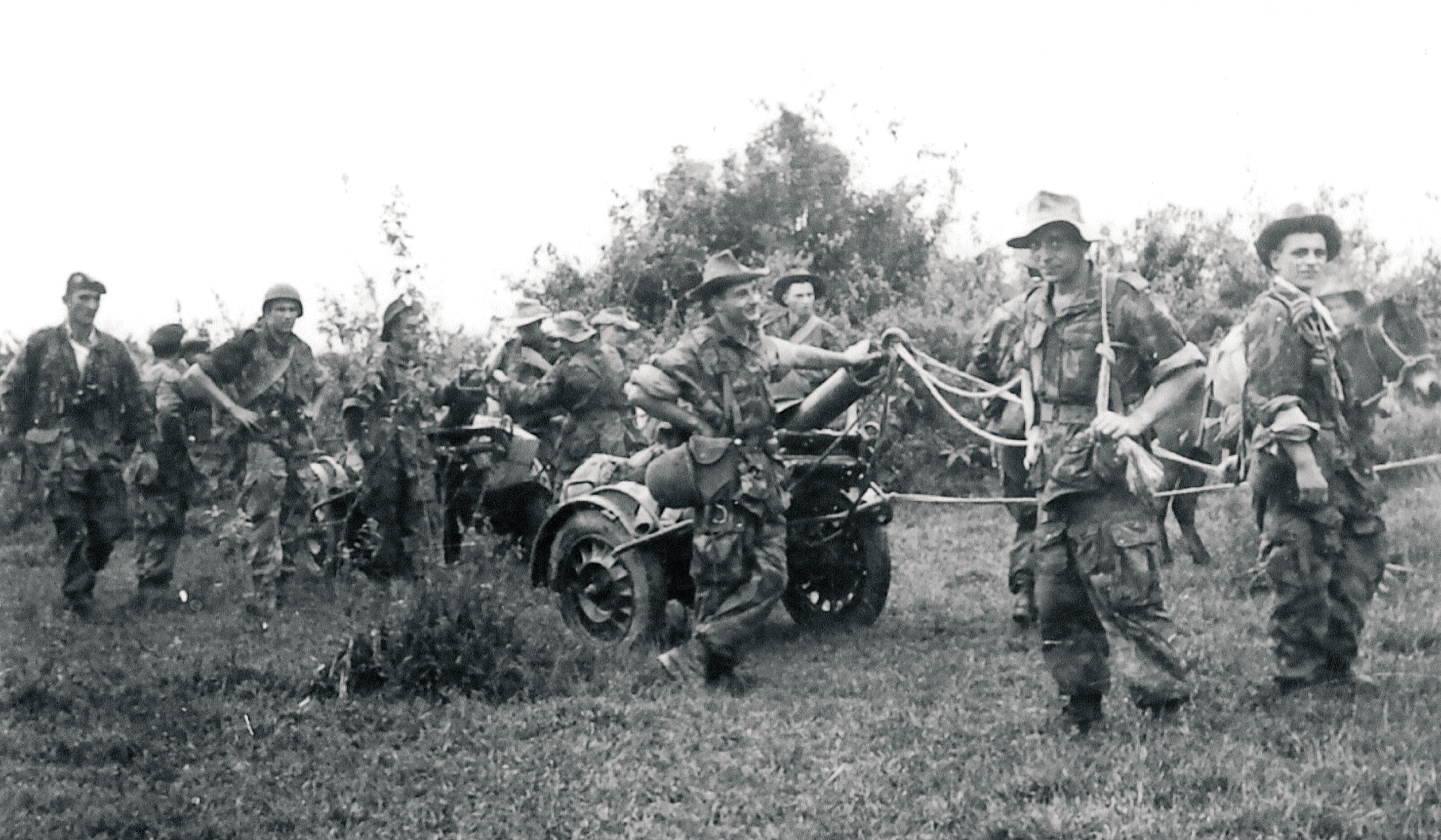
Legionnaires of the 1st Foreign Parachute Heavy Mortar Company in Indochina.

=== 2nd Foreign Parachute Battalion (1948–present) ===
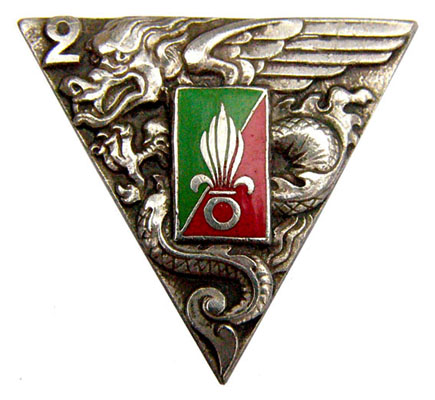
The 2nd Foreign Parachute Battalion (2e Bataillon Etranger de Parachutistes, 2e B.E.P) was created on October 1, 1948, in accordance with a ministerial prescription dating to March 27, 1948. The combat companies of the 2e B.E.P were formed by the 4th Demi-Brigade of the Foreign Legion in Morocco and the depot of the foreign regiments in Sidi-bel-Abbès, were assigned by the 25th Airborne Division Element. Made up of one command company and three fusiliers-voltigeurs type combat companies, the battalion cleared way to Oran on January 19, 1949, destined for Indochina. Disembarked in Saïgon on February 9, the battalion was directed to Kép (Cambodia) by land route. In November 1949, the battalion took base in Quan Thé.

The first combat engagements of the 2e B.E.P. have for theatre of operations, Cambodia, Cochinchine and Annam. In October 1950, the battalion was summoned to Tonkin. Reinforced by a heavy mortars company, the battalion engaged in all military operations in the Delta, in Thaï lands, Mékong and the plains of Jarres. The impressive series of combat engagements were earned at the battle of Nghĩa Lộ, colonial route N°6 (RC6), Hòa Bình and the defence of the camp by an airborne operation on Langson. Crowned of a magnificent epoque, the 2e B.E.P cleared the way to Dien Bien Phu on April 9 and 10 of 1954 in the middle of the furnace. Following the couter-attack of supporting point "Huguet", led by a rare determination during the night of the 22 and 23 of April; the 2e B.E.P and the 1st Foreign Parachute Battalion (1^{er} B.E.P) merged to form a single Foreign Marching Battalion. On May 7, the Foreign Marching Battalion was dissolved and the 2e B.E.P was recreated by members of the 3rd Foreign Parachute Battalion. On June 1, 1954, the 2e B.E.P. left Asia on November 1, 1955.

The colors of the battalion were decorated with 6 citations at the orders of the armed forces and the Fourragère of the colors of the Legion of Honor. The losses of the 2e B.E.P included 1500 Legion Officers, Sous-Officiers and Legionnaires killed along with their "chef de corps", Legion Commandant Barthélémy Rémy Raffali leading and heading tradition. Returned to Algeria, the 2nd Foreign Parachute Battalion (2^{e} B.E.P) became the 2nd Foreign Parachute Regiment on December 1, 1955.

The insignia of the 2nd Foreign Parachute Battalion was created in 1949, in Cambodia. The battalion insignia represents an Eastern winged Dragon making reference to the original implementation in Asia. The three point triangular shape of the insignia represents the form of an open parachute; centered by the flag colors of the Legion; and is symbol of the perfection that is expected of the men that may serve this regiment. The battalion was commanded at the time by commandant Solnon (1948–1950).

=== Algeria (1954–1962) ===
On December 1, 1955, the 2nd Foreign Parachute Battalion was enlarged to a full regiment, the 2nd Foreign Parachute Regiment (French: 2e Régiment étranger de parachutistes, 2e R.E.P). The regiment served throughout the Algerian War and suffered a total of 741 casualties.

When the 2nd Foreign Parachute Battalion left the Far East on November 1, 1955, the fanion of the battalion included six palms and the Fourragère with colors of the Légion d'honneur. The battalion had lost 1500 Officers, Sous-Officiers and Legionnaires including a battalion commander. On December 1 the 2e BEP became the 2nd Foreign Parachute Regiment (2e REP). During their first combat engagement, on January 5, the regiment lost its first fatality, while their opponents lost 22 of theirs. Regrouping at Philippeville, the companies covered appropriate sectors.

From March to June, two units operated in the Aurès Mountains. April 30 was marked with hard combat engagements. The regimental colors were received on June 5. In November, the regiment changed sectors. The command post set camp at Tébessa. In operational reserve, the regiment had for mission to run surveillance of the Algeria-Tunisia border. The year of 1956 ended with 900 rebels killed, 500 prisoners and significant war material recuperated. The foreign regiment had endured the loss of 38 men killed in combat.

In April 1957, the regiment returned to Philippeville. On May 30, the regiment left garrison and made way to El Milia (French: El Milia) in order to ensure the security of the almost island looking Collo and the region of Jijel (French: Jijel). In August, the regiment returned to Tébessa for a series of operations on the border where 35 rebels where placed out of combat at the expense of the lives of six Legionnaires. On December 18, the foreign regiment destroyed an opposing battalion size in the Hamimat Guerra. The rebels deplored 45 fatalities. In 1960, the regiment was spread in different garrisons : Chekfa, Tleta, Chahna, Siar and Philipeville at camp Pehau. During the 1st trimester, « Opération Turquoise » occupied the regiment which deplored four fatalities, eight wounded, however, the enemy left 24 outlaws (French: Hors La Loi, HLL), 2 prisoners, 5 defeated escapees, and 17 arrested suspects. One type 20 mm cannon recuperated, 1 PM, 10 war rifles and numerous munitions were destroyed. A couple of secondary operations were mounted such as « Saxophone » on January 26 and 27, "Clarinette" (3 HLL killed and one prisoner), « Basson I » on February 20 and 21, « Basson II » on March 8 and 9, (six HLL killed and 24 suspects arrested), « Zacharie » (1 leading figure died committing suicide and 2 defeated escapes) from March 15 to 17, « Victorien » (four defeated escapees), then in the 2nd trimester, « Turquoise » with secondary operations « Poisson » (two HLL killed, eight suspects arrested) on April 1 and 2, « Basson III » (three HLL killed and defeated escapees, on April 19, one Officer and two Legionnaires were killed in an ambush). After « Turquoise », followed « Opaline » in June.

In the first days of 1958, the regiment saw accelerated combat. On April 26 and 27, the foreign regiment placed out of combat 209 HLL (outlaws) in the region of Sbihi, seizing a strong arsenal including three machine-guns. On the 30, during the celebration of Camarón, a series of locations seals were placed into effect in order to intercept a band of rebels making way towards Ahras. 84 of them were killed. In January 1959, the foreign regiment made way towards Guelma, as operational reserve for the zone East Constantine. On March 1, the foreign regiment annihilated a battalion size force at Gambetta. On June 23, another battalion size rebel force was dismantled. 29 HLL were killed and 10 were made prisoners. During the 3rd trimester, the operations "Pierres précieuses" were launched. West Constantine was racked. The casualty results were heavy: 229 HLL killed, 99 prisoners, and the foreign regiment endured the loss of 11 Legionnaires. In January 1960, the 2e REP, now part of the 25th Parachute Division operated in the sector of Djidjelli. It's operation "Turquoise" again, secondary operation of operation "Pierres précieuses". On September 23, the foreign regiment returned to its rear base in Philipeville before rejoining Hammama where operation "Ariège" was commencing and which concerned the regions of Biskra and Kenchela. Before leaving the Aurès, the 2e REP inflicted another defeat on the rebels in Chelia, finishing with 53 HLL killed. On December 28, the foreign regiment made movement towards Oran then Tlemcen where the regiment arrived on December 30.

On May 1, 1961, following the dissolution of their brother regiment, 1st Foreign Parachute Regiment, the 2e REP remained the only heir of all Foreign Legion parachute units created since 1948.

Coming under the orders of the Western Oran Zone to reinforce the Algerian-Moroccan Barrage, the regiment remained until January 28, date where the later was found in the rear base. The operations, police rounds and presence rounds followed each other in the regions of Calle, Milia, Philipeville until March 18, 1962, date of the ceasefire which the foreign regiment learned of at Telergma. In less than seven years, more than 4000 rebels were placed out of combat and nearly 4000 individual arms and more than 200 collective arms were ceased.

The foreign regiment left Constantine, on August 30, 1962, after a continuous quasi presence for 6 years in the same region. On September 16, the foreign regiment regrouped at Bou-Sfer in the enclave of the Strategic Base of Mers El Kébir.

=== 2nd Foreign Paratrooper Regiment ===
==== The transition (1962–1967) ====
Starting 1962 and at the signature of the Évian Accords, the French Armed Forces progressively left Algeria for metropolitan France. For the first time in Legion history, Legion regiments would be garrisoned in mainland France.

For the 2e REP, this move would be made progressively between 1965 and 1967. From the former garrison at Bou-Sfer, the last French Base on Algerian territory, the Regiment sent units to start preparing the new garrison, situated in Calvi, in Corsica. This garrison was the former garrison of the 1st Parachute Choc Battalion of the 11th Parachute Choc Demi-Brigade, dissolved in 1963. The complete move would be effective in June 1967 and the regiment joined the 11th Parachute Division.

That period, the first period of peace in the history of the regiment after 14 years in existence, was accompanied with various challenges, significant for the legionnaires. The legionnaires had to face political decisions which were hard to comprehend. The dissolution of their "brother regiment", the 1st Foreign Parachute Regiment following the generals putsch left the regiment in significant disarray.

In addition, the foreign regiment was in a null phase of operations activity. The Regiment was garrisoned in camp, and stuck with no permission to move out of the designated area while being encircled by the local Algerian army, with whom the foreign regiment had been fighting against for eight years. Accordingly, the training and routine affected deeply the esprit de corps of the legionnaires.

It was during this périod, under Colonel Caillaud, that the companies started to specialize in a particular task: Anti-tank combat (1st company), Mountain combat (2nd company), Amphibious combat (3rd company) and Destruction explosive activities (4th company).

This regrouping reformed the R.E.P into an elite para-commando force. In June 1967 the regiment was moved to its current base at Camp Raffalli, Calvi on the island of Corsica. It was assigned to the 11th Division and became part of France's rapid intervention forces.

==== (1967–1978) ====
- Chad: (in 1969, Operations Pout, Manta, Sparrowhawk): Elements of the regiment were deployed to Chad in April 1969 as part of a French force to support the government against two rebel forces. Returning at the end of 1970. Individual companies were deployed again in 1978–79 to protect French lives and again in 1984.
- French Territory of the Afars and the Issas: (1976 Loyada, 1992 Operation Iskoutir).
- Zaire: In May 1978, a force of gendarmes katangais entered the Katanga province of Zaire from Angola and occupied the mining town of Kolwezi. They began to loot the town and kill government soldiers and civilians (including several Belgian and French employees of a mining company). At the request of the government of Zaire, 2 REP was airlifted to Kinshasa and dropped on Kolwezi. The operation was a success and the town was quickly recaptured with minor casualties in the ranks of the paratroopers. Some 120 civilian hostages died in the occupation.

==== (1978–2015) ====
In 1994, the parachute company which the REP had provided for the 13th Demi-Brigade of Foreign Legion (13e DBLE) was dissolved. Nevertheless, the 2e REP continued each year to supply a company on 4-month rotations until the departure of the 13e DBLE on June 13, 2011.

Operations:

- 1982 Lebanon: (Operation Épaulard I spearheaded by Lieutenant Colonel Bernard Janvier from August to September 1982 under command of Général de brigade Jean-Claude Coullon, in preparation for the Multinational Force in Lebanon and then United Nations Interim Force in Lebanon ) along with the 31st Brigade which included the Operational Group of the Foreign Legion.
- 1990-91 Kuwait: in Division Daguet part of Opération Daguet, Reconnaissance and Deep Action Commandos (French: Commandos de renseignement et d'action dans la profondeur), and contingents of 1st Marine Infantry Paratroopers Regiment in Saudi Arabia under the command of Général de brigade Bernard Janvier
- 1990, 1992 Rwanda: Operation Noroit
- 1990 Gabon: Operation Shark
- 1992 Somalia: (French: opération Oryx)
- 1996 Central African Republic: Operation Almandine
- 1997 Congo-Brazzaville: Operation Pelican
- 1993 to 2003 Former Yugoslavia: 1993 Sarajevo; 1995, 1996 and 1999 KFOR: 2001 and 2003 Kosovo
- 2002, 2004, 2006, 2010 Côte d'Ivoire: Opération Licorne

==== 2008–2015 ====
The regiment served in Afghanistan with the International Security Assistance Force sending OMLTs in 2008 and 2012: GTIA (Altor in 2010) and SGTIA (Ba cum in 2011) as part of Brigade La Fayette (Operation Pamir). Three Legionnaires, Nepali Kisan Thapa, Pole Konrad Rygiel and Slovak Robert Hutník were killed in action.

There were structural changes from 2010. In January 2011, a defense base in Calvi was created. Colonel Plessy was the first commandant of the designated defense base, while being the regimental commander of the 2e REP.

2e REP continued to be deployed on short duration missions: in Djibouti until the departure of the 13th Demi-Brigade of Foreign Legion in 2011; to Gabon; to New Caledonia; and as of 2012, in the United Arab Emirates as a deployed company of the 13e DBLE, alternating with Legion infantry units from metropolitan France.

In 2012, a subunit from the United Arab Emirates deployment protected the French Military Hospital in Jordan during Operation Tamour (fr:opération Tamour).

During the night of January 27 and 28, 2013, a company of the 2e REP was parachuted into the city of Timbuktu as part of Operation Serval in Mali. This was the regiment's first parachute drop since Kolwezi in 1978.

In 2015, a fifth combat company was formed, specialized in desert warfare.

==== Global war on terror from 2015 until present ====
Operation Serval in Mali having been replaced by Operation Barkhane in the Saharan Sahel in August 2014, 3 combat sections of the regiment parachuted in the north of Niger between April 7 and April 13, 2015.

The war on terror in France and Opération Sentinelle means the regiment operates in mainland France.

== Selection ==
Promo Parachutiste is the selection course which Legionnaires intending to join 2ème REP undergo at Camp Raffalli in Calvi, Haute-Corse. Following selections, a Legionnaire's training begins with 12 months of physical, mental and psychological tests across all terrain and weather conditions including special operations.

2e R.E.P is the only regiment of the 11th Parachute Brigade which trains their own paratroopers. The Legionnaires spend their parachute training in Calvi TAP within the walls of the regiment. All other French Army paratrooper units are trained at the École des troupes aéroportées (ETAP) in Pau.

Stringent Training Practices – The Slovak recruit Joszef Tvarusko, who was part of the 2e R.E.P of the French Foreign Legion, died from heatstroke during a rigorous exercise in Djibouti in May 2008, leading to the trial of four of his superiors over alleged harsh treatment.

== Organization ==
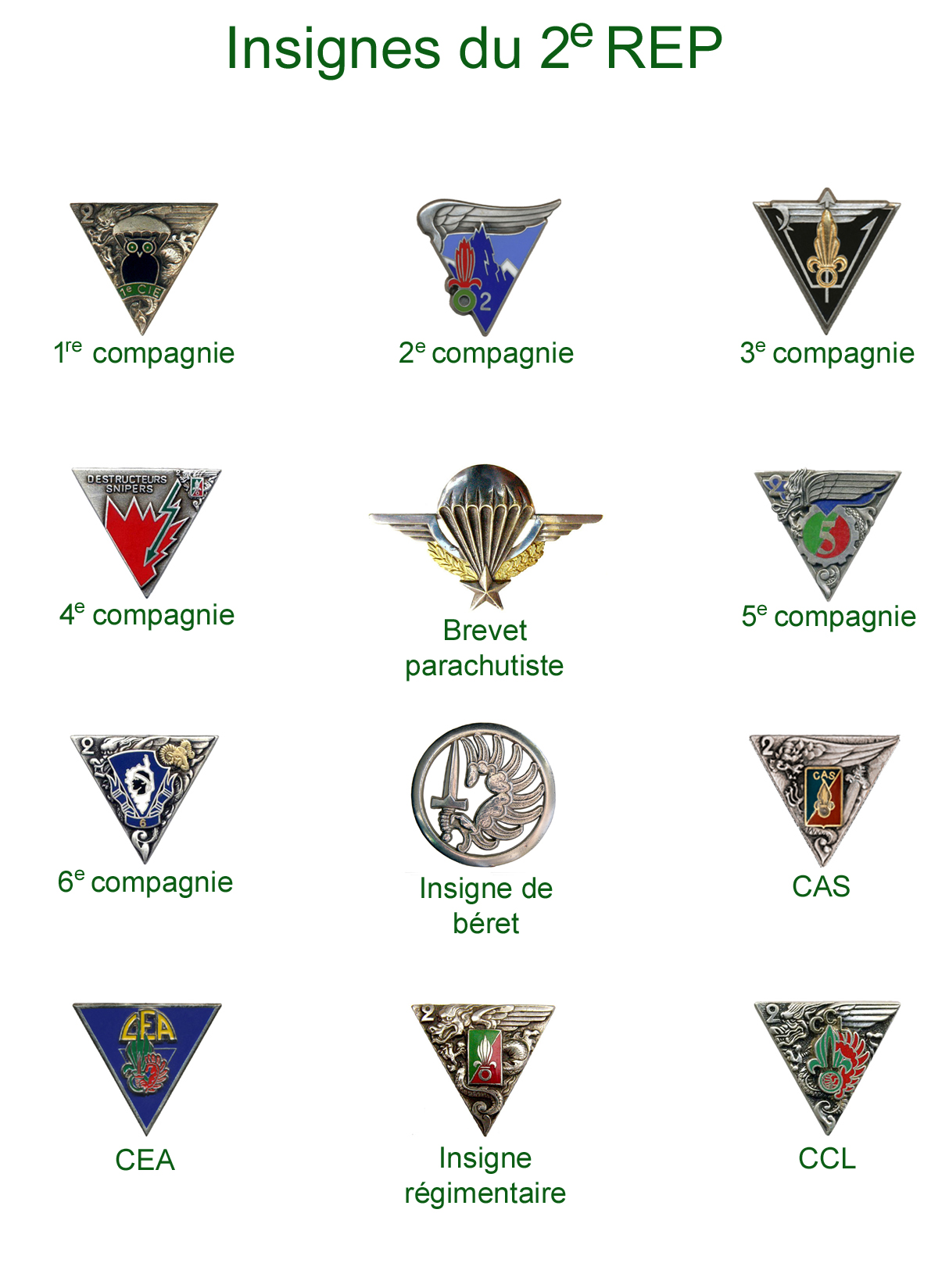
Insignias of the 2nd Foreign Parachute Regiment.

The regiment is composed of around 1310 men organized into 10 companies and a reserve unit of 60 men. As of 2018, the structure of the 2nd Foreign Parachute Regiment consisted of:

- Compagnie de Commandement et de Logistique (CCL) – Command and Logistics Company
- Compagnie d'Administration et de Soutien (CAS) – Administrative and Support Company
- 1^{re} CIE – 1st Company (specialises in urban warfare) (a command section and 4 combat sections - a French section is equivalent to a platoon in Anglophone armies)
- 2^{e} CIE – 2nd Company (specialises in mountain warfare) (a command section and 4 combat sections)
- 3^{e} CIE – 3rd Company (specialises in amphibious warfare) (a command section and 4 combat sections)
- 4^{e} CIE – 4th Company (specialises in woodland warfare) (a command section and 4 combat sections)
- 5^{e} CIE – 5th Company (specialises in desert warfare) ( a command section and 4 combat sections)
- 6^{e} CIE – 6th Company (reserve company), formed in July 2001 upon the dissolution of the 173rd Infantry Regiment of Corsica
- Compagnie d'Appui (CA) (then known as Compagnie d'éclairage et d'appui – CEA) – Combat Support Company
  - Section de Reconnaissance Régimentaire (SRR) – Motorised Reconnaissance Platoon
  - Section d'Appui Direct (SAD) – Portable Medium-range Missile Platoon
  - Section d'Appui Mortier (SAM-120) – Heavy Mortar Platoon
  - Section de Tireurs d'Elite (STE) – Elite Snipers Platoon
  - Groupement des Commandos Parachutistes (GCP) – Parachute Commando Group
- Compagnie de Maintenance Régimentaire (CMR) (then known as 5^{e} Compagnie de maintenance – 5^{e} CM) – Regimental Maintenance Company (formed August 1994)

Consisting similarly to the DINOPS, PCG, GCM of the Legion REGs, the 2^{e} REP operates more specialized action teams than other Legion regiments. These include the GCP of the Commando Parachute Group – Groupement Commando Parachutiste which is a special forces unit of the 11th Parachute Brigade of the French Army. While GCP members of other specialized regular units wear the parachutist's red beret, the 2^{e} REP GCP members wear the green beret.

== Traditions ==
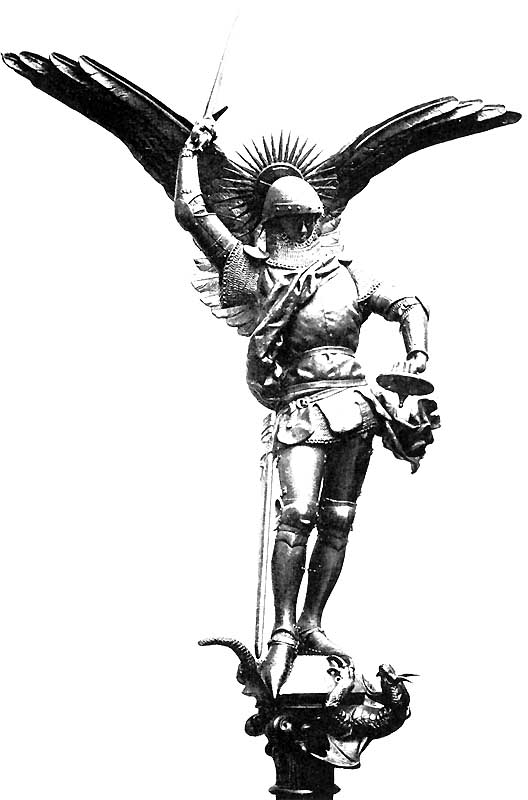
The Archangel Michael featured in Mont Saint-Michel and the Insignia of the 9th Parachute Chasseur Regiment.

Except for the Legionnaires of the 1^{er} REG, 2^{e} REG, 2^{e} REP that retain the green beret; the remainder of the metropolitan French army and marine paratroopers, of the 11th Parachute Brigade, wear the red beret.

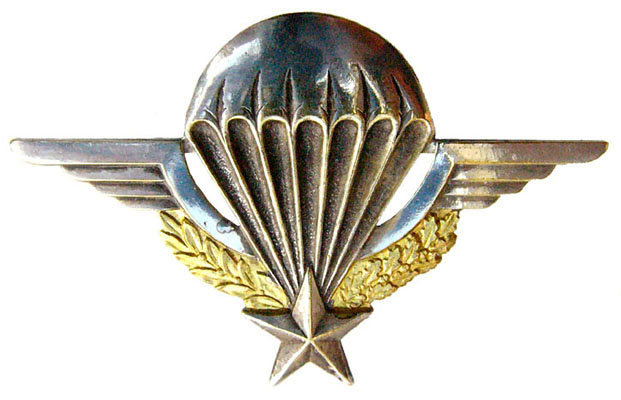
French parachute brevet.

=== Insignias ===
The insignia of the French metropolitan Paratroopers represents a closed "winged armed dextrochere", meaning a "right winged arm" armed with a sword pointing upwards. The Insignia makes reference to the Patron of Paratroopers. In fact, the Insignia represents "the right Arm of Saint Michael", the Archangel which according to Liturgy is the "Armed Arm of God". This Insignia is the symbol of righteous combat and fidelity to superior missions.

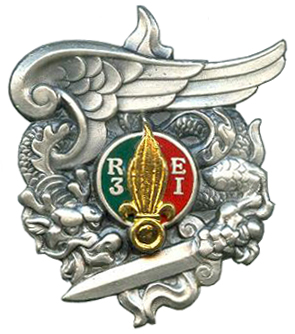
Co. Para du 3^{e} R.E.I in the 1^{er} B.E.P and 1^{er} R.E.P

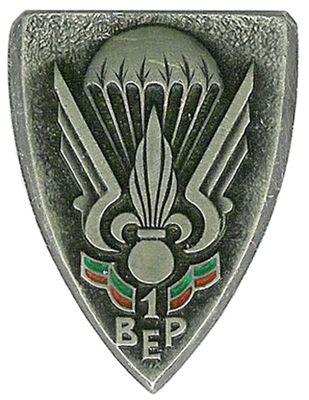
1^{er} B.E.P

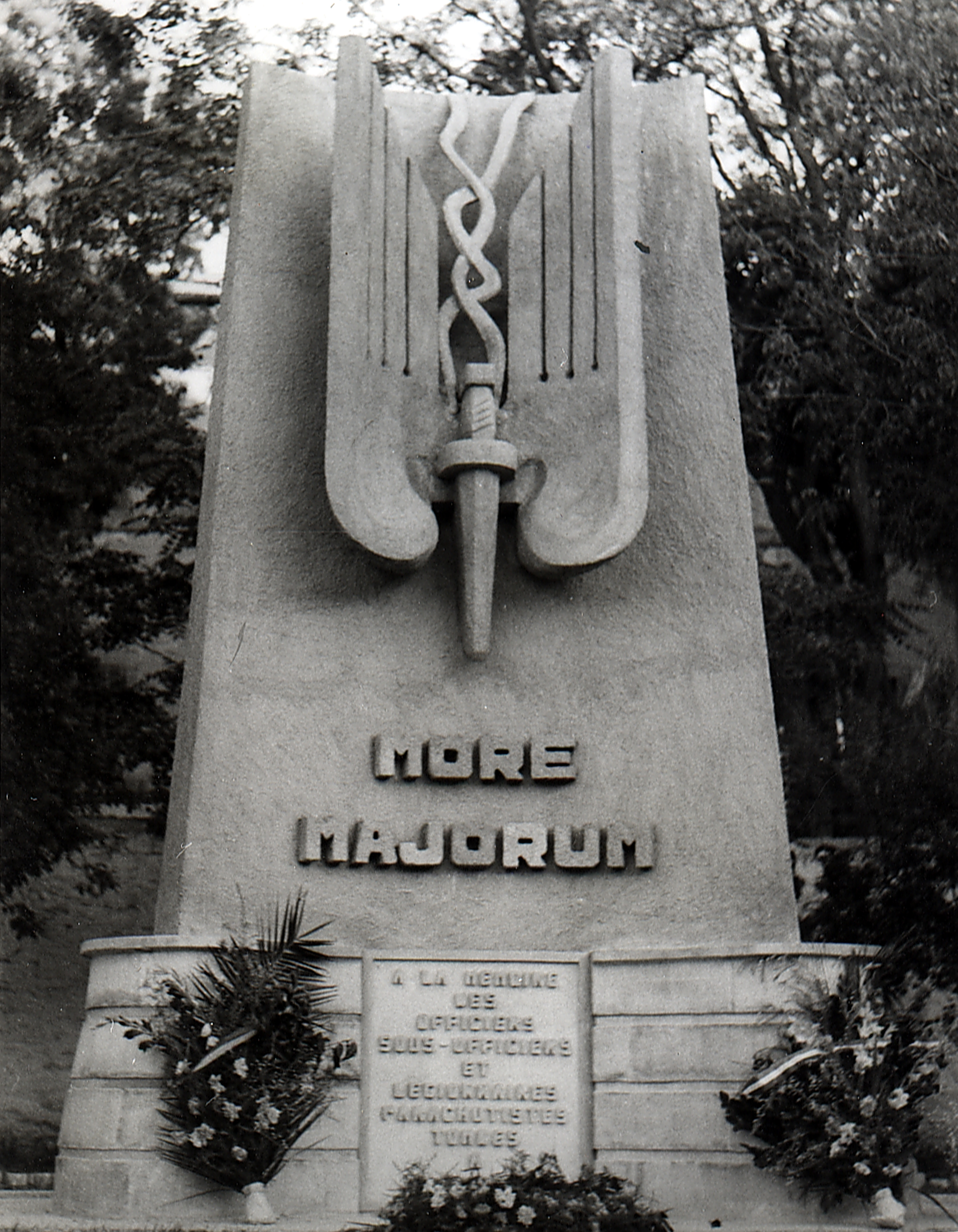
Officers, Sous-Officiers and Legionnaires of the C.E.Ps, B.E.Ps and R.E.Ps

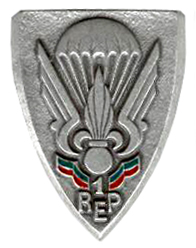
1^{er} R.E.P

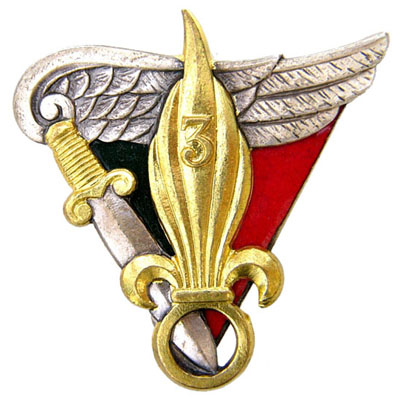
3^{e} B.E.P & 3^{e} R.E.P
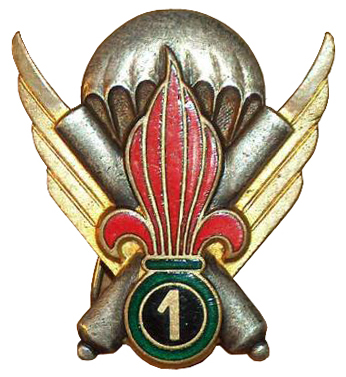
1^{re} C.E.P de M.L

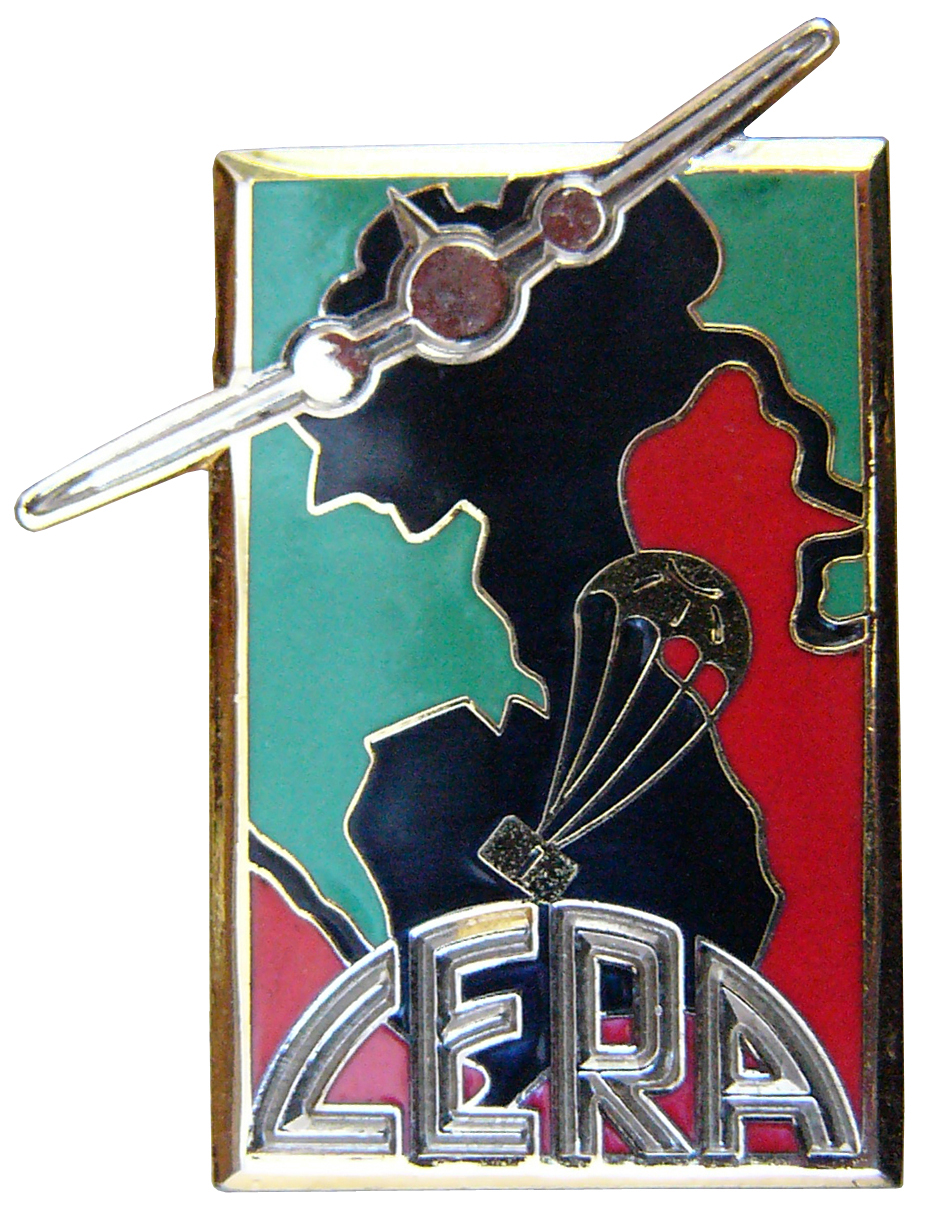
C.E.R.A

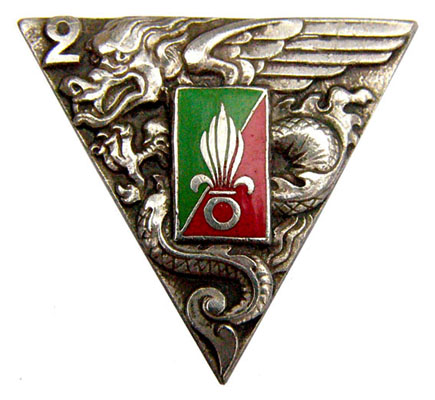
2^{e} B.E.P

==== Regimental Colors ====
Colors of the 2nd Foreign Parachute Regiment

Bearing stitched in golden letters, the following inscriptions.

==== Regimental Songs ====
Chant de Marche : La Légion marche featuring:

La Légion marche vers le front,
En chantant nous suivons,
Héritiers de ses traditions,
Nous sommes avec elle.

(Refrain)
Nous sommes les hommes des troupes d'assaut,
Soldats de la vieille Légion,
Demain brandissant nos drapeaux,
En vainqueurs nous défilerons,
Nous n'avons pas seulement des armes,
Mais le diable marche avec nous,
Ha, ha, ha, ha, ha, ha, ha, car nos aînés de la Légion,
Se battant là-bas, nous emboîtons le pas.

Pour ce destin de chevalier,
Honneur, Fidélité,
Nous sommes fiers d'appartenir
Au 2^{e} REP.

==== Decorations ====
The regimental colors are decorated with:

- Croix de guerre des théâtres d'opérations extérieures with:
  - 6 palms obtained during the campaigns of the First Indochina War. The 6 palms obtained during the same campaign allows the regiment to wear the red fourragère.
- Fourragère with:
  - ruban colors of the Légion d'honneur, only two regiments (2^{e} R.E.P & 1^{er} R.C.P) earned this fourragère for participating in military campaigns in Indochina. The 2^{e} REP has received a second fourragère Valeur Militaire in July 2013
- Cross for Military Valour with 4 palms for the following citations:
  - Intervention at Loyada ( Djibouti, frontier with Somalia) in 1976 and the Battle of Kolwezi in 1978.
  - Interventions in Afghanistan with the contingents of ISAF(2 palms).
  - Airborne operations on Timbuktu during Operation Serval in 2013.
- Fourragère with:
  - the attribution of the two citations for the same operation theatre confers the right to wear the fourragère with colors of the Croix de la Valeur militaire (as of July, 2013) and the olive colors of the Médaille militaire for the ensemble of the four conferred citations.
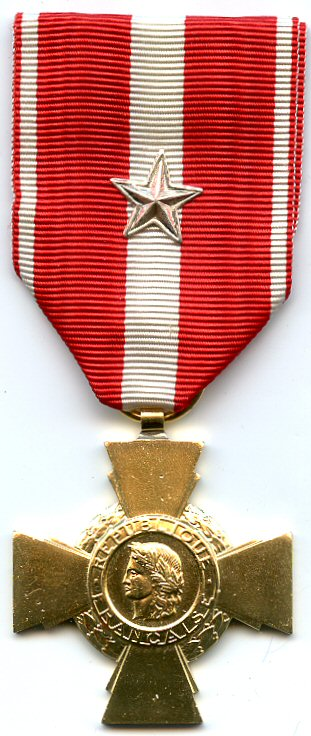
Croix de la Valeur militaire

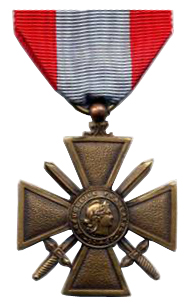
Croix de guerre des théâtres d'opérations extérieures

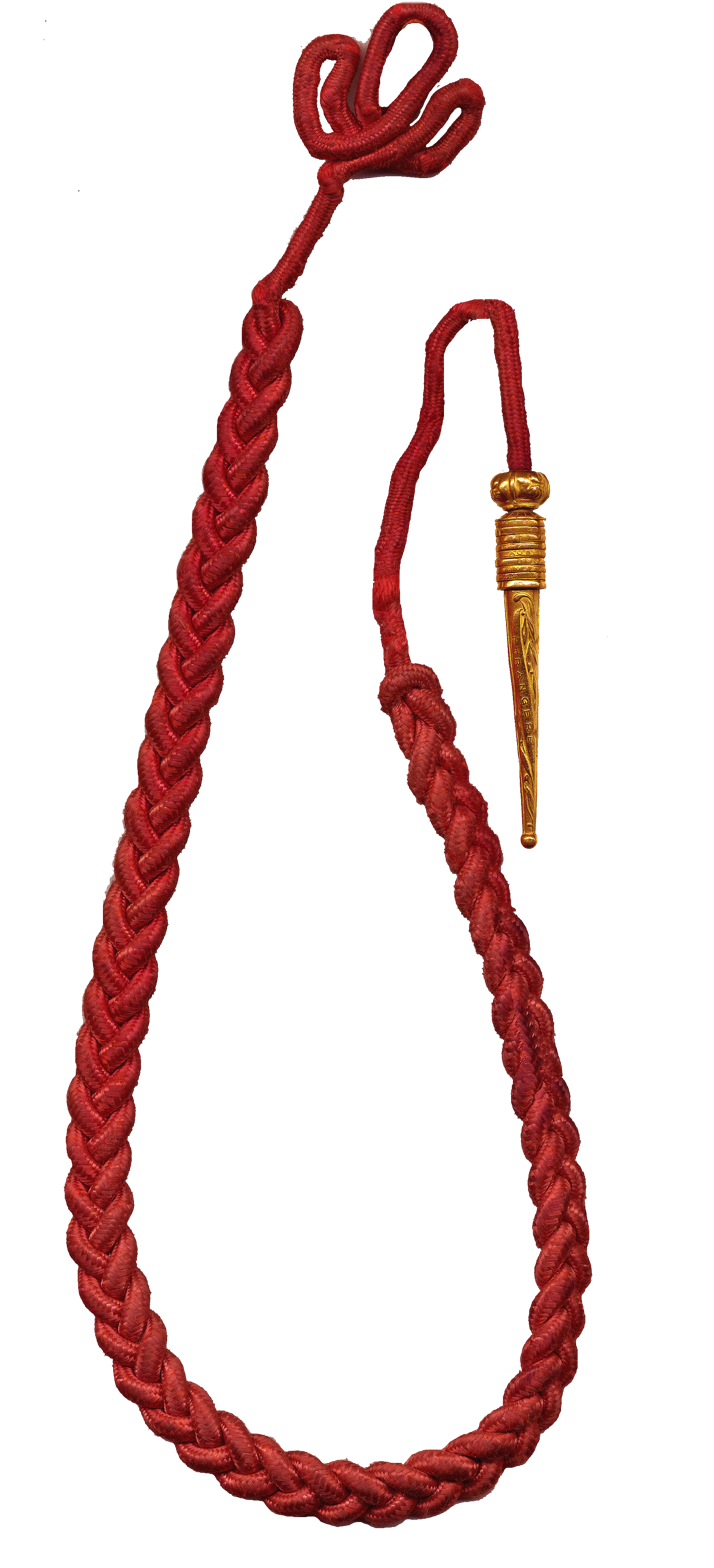
Fourragère with color ruban of the Legion of Honor

==== Honours ====
===== Battle honours =====
- Camerone 1863
- Indochine 1949–1954
- AFN 1952–1962

== Company, Battalion & Regimental Commanders ==
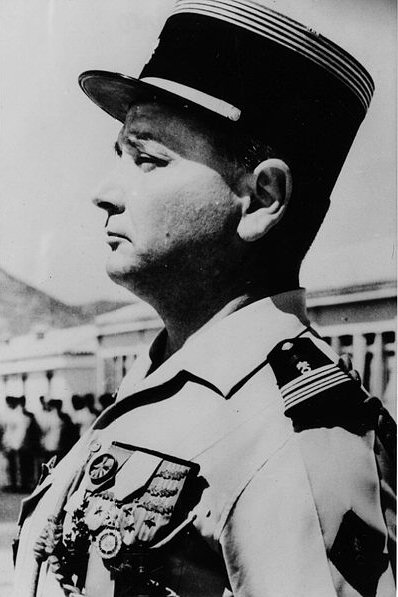
Colonel Paul Marie Félix Jacques René Arnaud de Foïard (1921–2005).

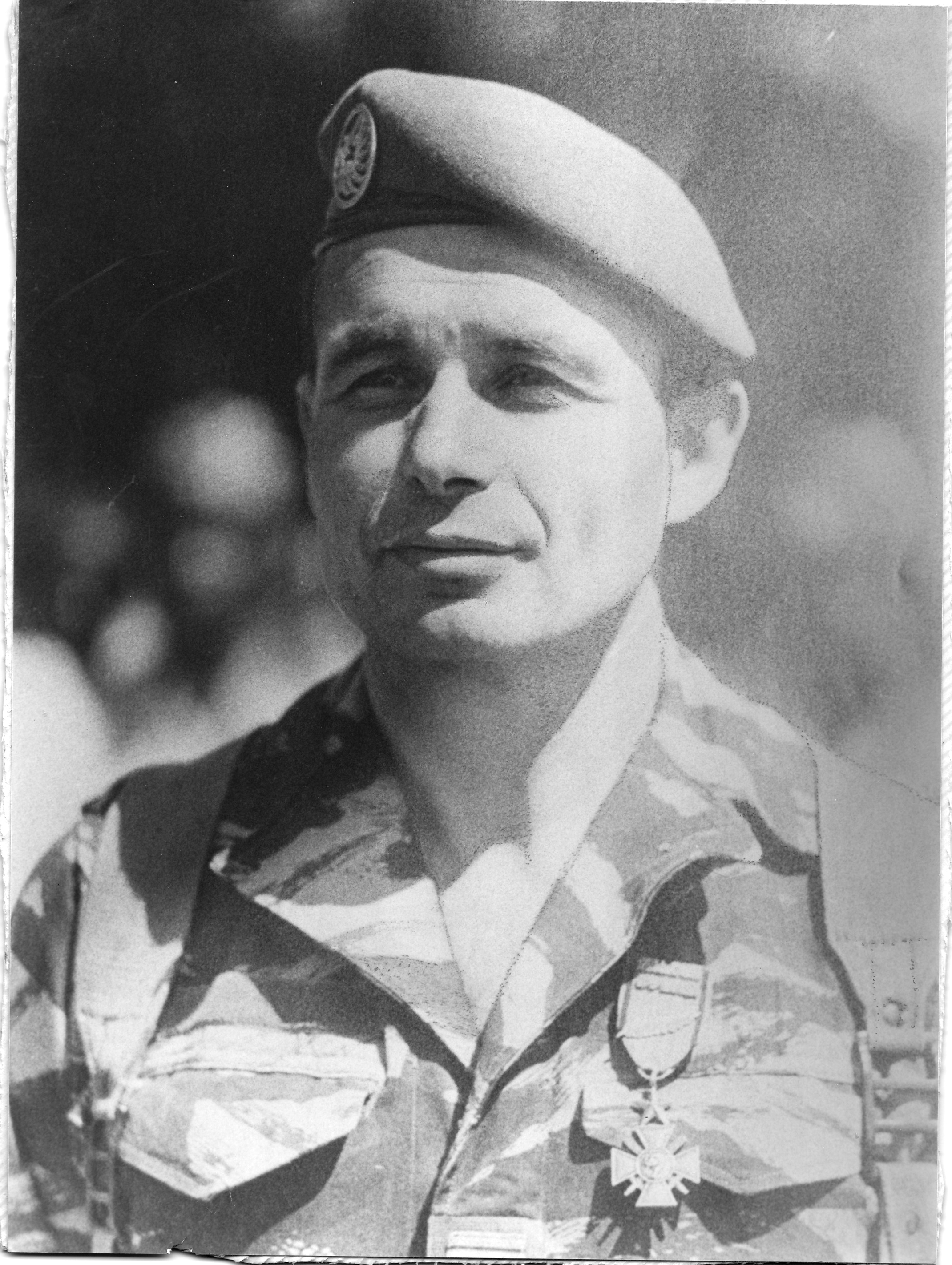
Colonel Philippe Louis Edmé Marie François Erulin (1932–1979).

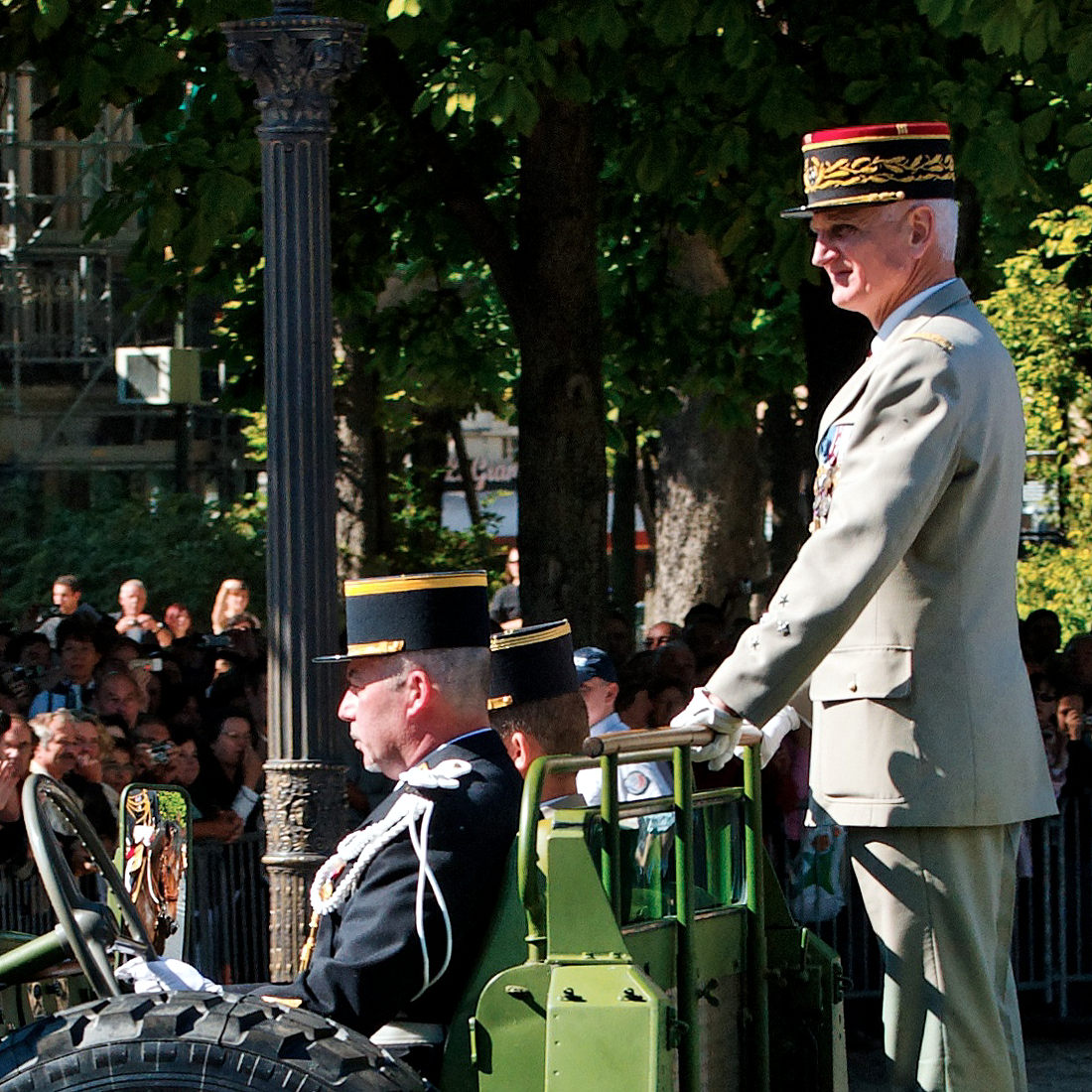
Colonel Bruno Dary

Note (* †): Legion officers killed leading their battalions and regiments

=== 2nd Foreign Parachute Battalion (1948–1955) ===
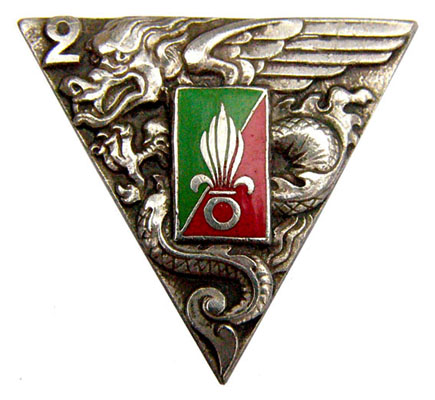
2^{e} Bataillon Etranger de Parachutistes Tenure ( 1948–1955 )

- 1948 : captain Solnon
- 1950 : captain Dussert
- 1950 : Chef d'escadrons Commandant Barthélémy Rémy Raffali (* †)
- 1952 : chef de bataillon Bloch
- 1953 : captain Merglen
- 1953 : chef de bataillon Liesenfelt
- 1954 : captain Vial
- 1954 : chef de bataillon Masselot

=== 2nd Foreign Parachute Regiment 1955–present ===
Commanding Officers 1955–1975

- 1955 : lieutenant-colonel Alfred de Vismes
- 1958 : chef de bataillon Georges Masselot
- 1958 : colonel Jacques Lefort
- 1960 : lieutenant-colonel Pierre Darmuzai
- 1961 : lieutenant-colonel Charles Maurice Chenel
- 1963 : lieutenant-colonel Robert Caillaud
- 1965 : lieutenant-colonel Paul Arnaud de Foïard
- 1967 : lieutenant-colonel Jeannou Lacaze
- 1970 : lieutenant-colonel Jean Dupoux
- 1972 : lieutenant-colonel Bernard Goupil
- 1974 : lieutenant-colonel Jean Brette

Commanding Officers 1975–1995

- 1976 : colonel Philippe Louis Edmé Marie François Erulin
- 1978 : lieutenant-colonel Jean Louis Roué
- 1980 : colonel Michel Guignon
- 1982 : lieutenant-colonel Bernard Janvier
- 1984 : colonel Raymond Germanos
- 1986 : colonel Jean Michel Wabinski
- 1988 : colonel Stephane Coevoet
- 1990 : colonel Gausserès
- 1992 : colonel Michel Poulet
- 1994 : colonel Bruno Dary

Commanding Officers 1995–present

- 1996 : colonel Benoît Puga
- 1998 : lieutenant-colonel Philippe Prevost
- 2000 : colonel Alain Bouquin
- 2002 : colonel Emmanuel Maurin
- 2004 : colonel Paulet
- 2006 : colonel Houdet Brice
- 2008 : colonel Éric Bellot des Minières
- 2010 : colonel François Plessy
- 2012 : colonel Benoît Desmeulles
- 2014 : colonel Jean-Michel Meunier
- 2016 : colonel Jean de Monicault

== Notable Officers, Sous-Officiers and Legionnaires ==
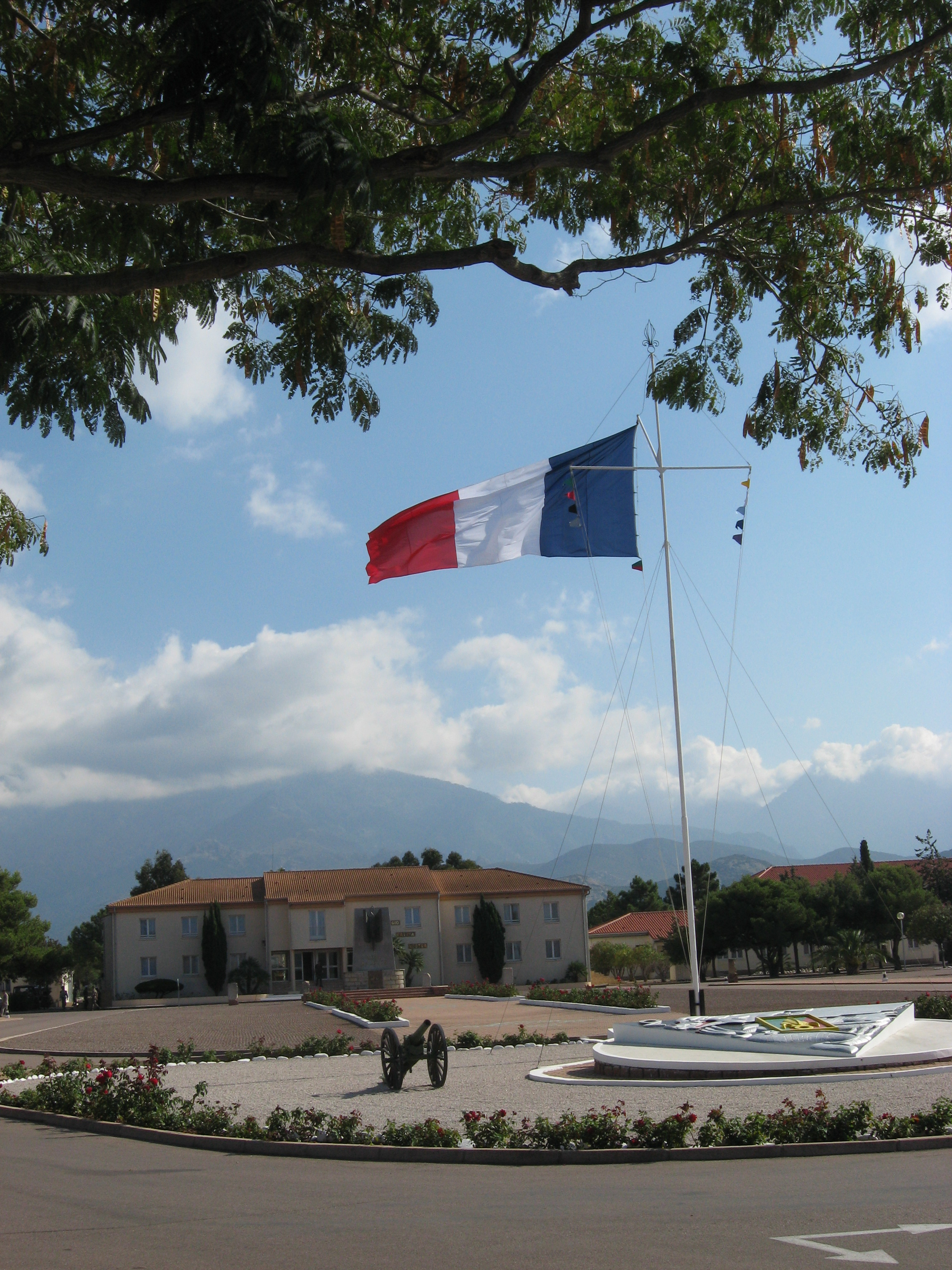
Regimental Colors of the 2nd Foreign Parachute Regiment flying at the regiment's barracks at Calvi, Corsica

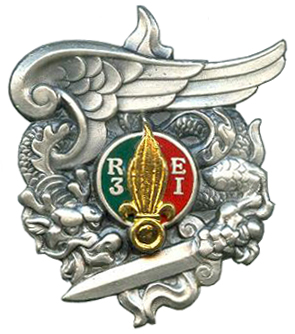
Co. Para du 3e REI

- Jacques Morin ( 3^{e} REI; [[Co. Para du 3^{e} REI]], 1er BEP; 1er REP, 10^{e} D.P)
- Paul Arnaud de Foïard (Co. Para du 3^{e} REI; [[2^{e} REP]]; [[11th Parachute Division

(France)|11^{e} DP]])

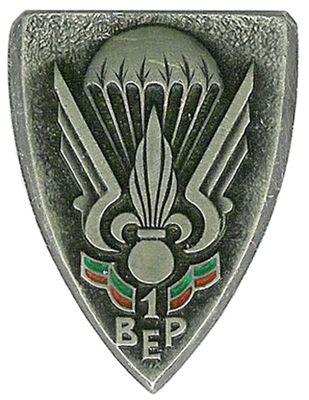
1st Foreign Parachute Battalion

- Pierre Côme André Segrétain ( 1^{er} RE; 2^{e} REI; 1^{er} RCP; 1^{er} BEP )
- Pierre Paul Jeanpierre ( 1^{er} RE; 6^{e} REI; 2^{e} REI; [[1^{er} BEP]]; 1^{er} REP)
- Pierre Darmuzai
- Pierre Marie Guy Sergent ( 1st Foreign Regiment; 1er BEP; 1er REP)
- Hélie Denoix de Saint Marc ( 3^{e} REI, 1^{er} BEP; 1^{er} REP; 2^{e} BEP )
- Roger Faulques ( 3^{e} REI, 1^{e} BEP; 1^{e} REP; 2^{e} REP)

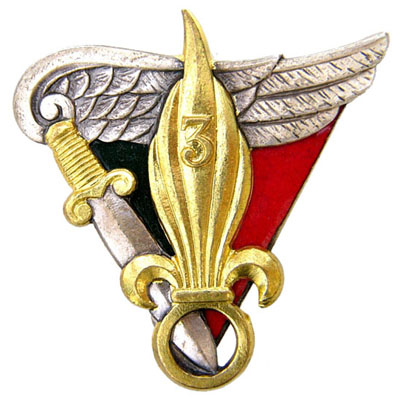
3^{e} B.E.P & 3^{e} REP

- Pierre Darmuzai (3^{e} BEP)
- Claude Barrès ( French SAS, 2^{e} RCP SAS, 2^{e} BCCP, GCMA, 3^{e} BEP, 9^{e} RCP)

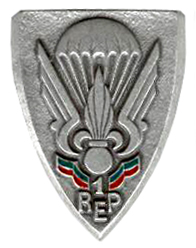
1^{er} R.E.P

- Pierre Paul Jeanpierre ( 1^{er} RE; 6^{e} REI; 2^{e} REI; 1^{er} BEP, 1^{er} REP )
- Pierre Marie Guy Sergent ( 1^{er} RE; 1^{er} BEP; 1^{er} REP )
- Hélie Denoix de Saint Marc ( 3^{e} REI, 1^{er} BEP; 1^{er} REP; 2^{e} BEP )
- Guy Rubin de Cervens ( 3^{e} BPV, 1^{er} REP, 10^{e} DP, 11^{e} Choc )
- Roger Faulques ( 3^{e} REI, 1^{e} BEP; 1^{e} REP; 2^{e} REP )
- Adjudant Szuts (1^{er} REP, 3^{e} REI)
- Adjudant Tasnady (1^{er} REP)
- Adjudant Chef Valko, (1^{er} REP, 5^{e} REI)

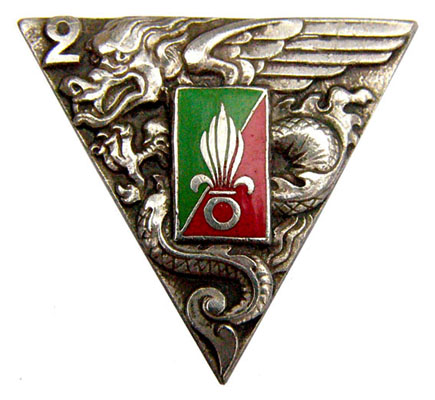
2^{e} B.E.P

- Barthélémy Rémy Raffali (1^{er} RE, 3^{e} BEP, 1^{er} BEP, 2^{e} B.E.P)
- Georges Hamacek ( 3^{e} REI, 3^{e} BEP; 2^{e} BEP, 4^{e} Company )
- Hélie Denoix de Saint Marc ( 3^{e} REI, 1^{er} BEP; 1^{er} REP; 2^{e} BEP )

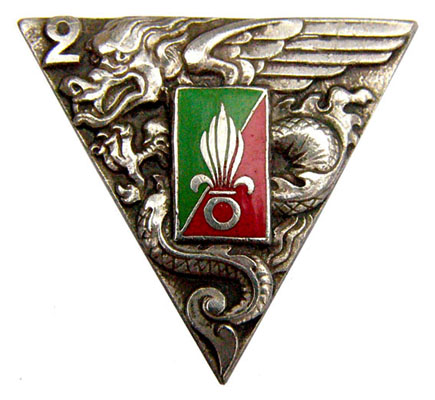
2^{e} R.E.P

- Jacques Lefort ( 1^{er} CHOC; 2^{e} REP; ITLE )
- Pierre Darmuzai ( 1^{er} BEP; 3^{e} BEP; 3^{e} REP; 2^{e} REP )
- Paul Arnaud de Foïard ( Para company of 3^{e} REI; 2^{e} REP; 11^{e} DP )
- Bernard Goupil ( 2^{e} REP, GLE )
- Jean Brette ( 2^{e} REP )
- Erwan Bergot ( 6^{e} BPC; 1^{er} BEP; 2^{e} REP )
- Roger Faulques ( 3^{e} REI, 1^{e} BEP; 1^{e} REP; 2^{e} REP )
- Pierre-Eugene Bourgin (2^{e} REC; 2^{e} REP)
- Michel de Courrèges ( 2^{e} REP; 9^{e} RCP; 11^{e} DP )
- Philippe Louis Edmé Marie François Erulin ( 2^{e} REP, 1^{er} RCP )
- Bernard Janvier ( 2^{e} REP )
- Adrian Cristian Danciu ( 2^{e} REP )
- Ante Gotovina ( 2^{e} REP )
- Simon Murray ( 2^{e} REP )
- Dominique Vandenberg ( 2^{e} REP )
- Akihiko Saito ( 2^{e} REP )
