= Alain Bouquin =

French general

Alain Bouqin
- Born: 1958 (age 67–68)
- Military career
- Allegiance: France
- Branch: French Army
- Service years: 1979–2015
- Rank: Général de corps d'armée
- Units: 4th Foreign Regiment; 4^{e} RE; 2nd Foreign Parachute Regiment; 2^{e} REP
- Commands: 2nd Foreign Parachute Regiment; 2^{e} REP Commandement de la Légion Étrangère

Alain Bouquin (born 1958) was a Général of the French Army and the Commandant of the Foreign Legion.

== Military career ==
Saint-Cyrien of the promotion of « Général Paul-Frédéric Rollet » (1978–1980), he was assigned after one year at Montpellier, to the 4th Foreign Regiment 4^{e} RE in 1980. One year later in 1981, he was assigned to the 2nd Foreign Parachute Regiment 2^{e} R.E.P until 1990, occupying the functions of section (platoon) chief, assistant officer, Commandant (Major) of a combat company, then officer in charge of the instruction and operations bureau.

After one year at the general staff headquarters of the 3rd Corps, he integrated in 1991 National Superior Technical Advanced School (French: l'Ecole Nationale Supérieure des Techniques Avancées) as a trainee of the technical brevet of the EMSST. Graduate in 1993 of the 107th promotion of the Superior Course of the general staff headquarters, he joined one year later, the 2nd promotion of the Interarm Defense College (French: Collège interarmées de Défense, CID).

From 1995 to 2000, he served successively at the general staff headquarters of the Armies (French: l'état major des Armées, EMA) at the bureau of study then at the general staff headquarters staff of French Forces stationed in Djibouti as division chief of operations.

In 2000, he was designated as the regimental commander of the 2ème REP. During his command tenure, he rejoined the Interarm Defense College (French: Collège interarmées de Défense, CID) as the chief cell of operational simulations, before being the auditor of the 54th promotion of CHEM and the 57th promotion of the Institute of Superior National Defense Studies (French: l'Institut des Hautes études de la Défense Nationale, IHEDN).

Prior to assuming the command of the French Foreign Legion, général Bouquin was assigned since 2005 at the general staff headquarters of the French Army (EMAT) where he occupied in his last year the post of Secretary General Council of Systems Forces.

Général de brigade since 1 August 2008, he assumed the command of the Foreign Legion in 2009, a post which he held till 2011. During his career, général Bouquin participated to numerous exterior operations, most notably in Chad and Central African Republic (1984, 1986, 1988, 1989) as well as Kosovo in 2001.

On 1 April 2011, général Bouquin was promoted to the rank of Général de division and while in function, he was subsequently promoted to Général de corps d'armée.

== Recognitions and honors ==

- Officier of the Legion of Honour
- Officier of the Ordre national du Mérite
- Croix de la Valeur Militaire (1 bronze star)
- Croix du combattant
- Médaille d'Outre-Mer
- Médaille de la Défense nationale (médaille d'argent)
- Medaille de Reconnaissance de la Nation (d'Afrique du Nord)
- Médaille commémorative française

== See also ==
- Major (France)
- French Foreign Legion Music Band (MLE)
