= Camp Raffalli =

French Army military camp

- Calvi, Corsica, France
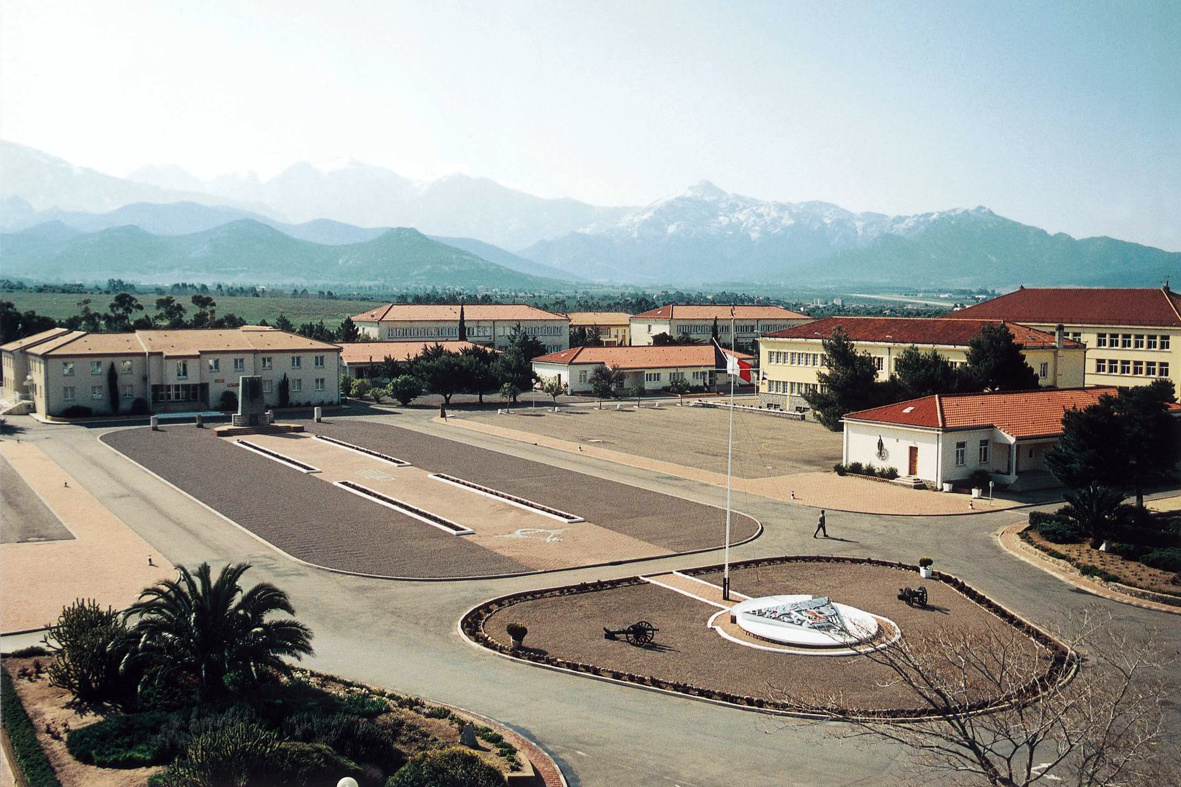

Site information
- Type: Barracks
- Owner: Ministry of Armed Forces
- Controlled by: French Army
- Condition: Occupied by 2^{ème} REP

Location
- Coordinates: 42.5578°N 8.7998°E

Camp Raffalli is a military camp of the French Army. It is located in the municipalities of Calenzana and Calvi, Haute-Corse. It serves as a garrison and training ground for the 2nd Foreign Parachute Regiment (2^{ème} REP) and the Calvi defense base support group.

== Gallery ==
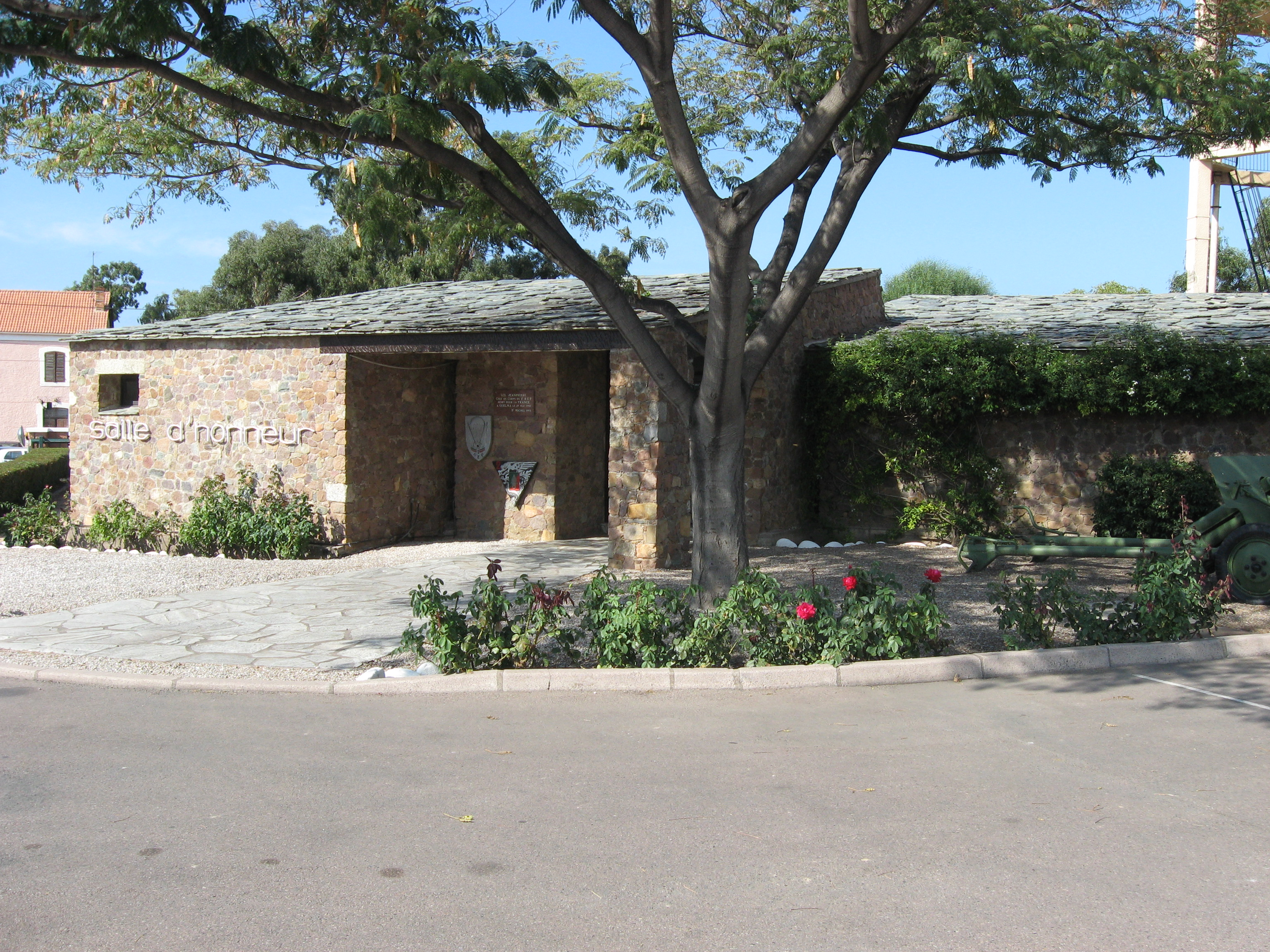
2ème REP museum

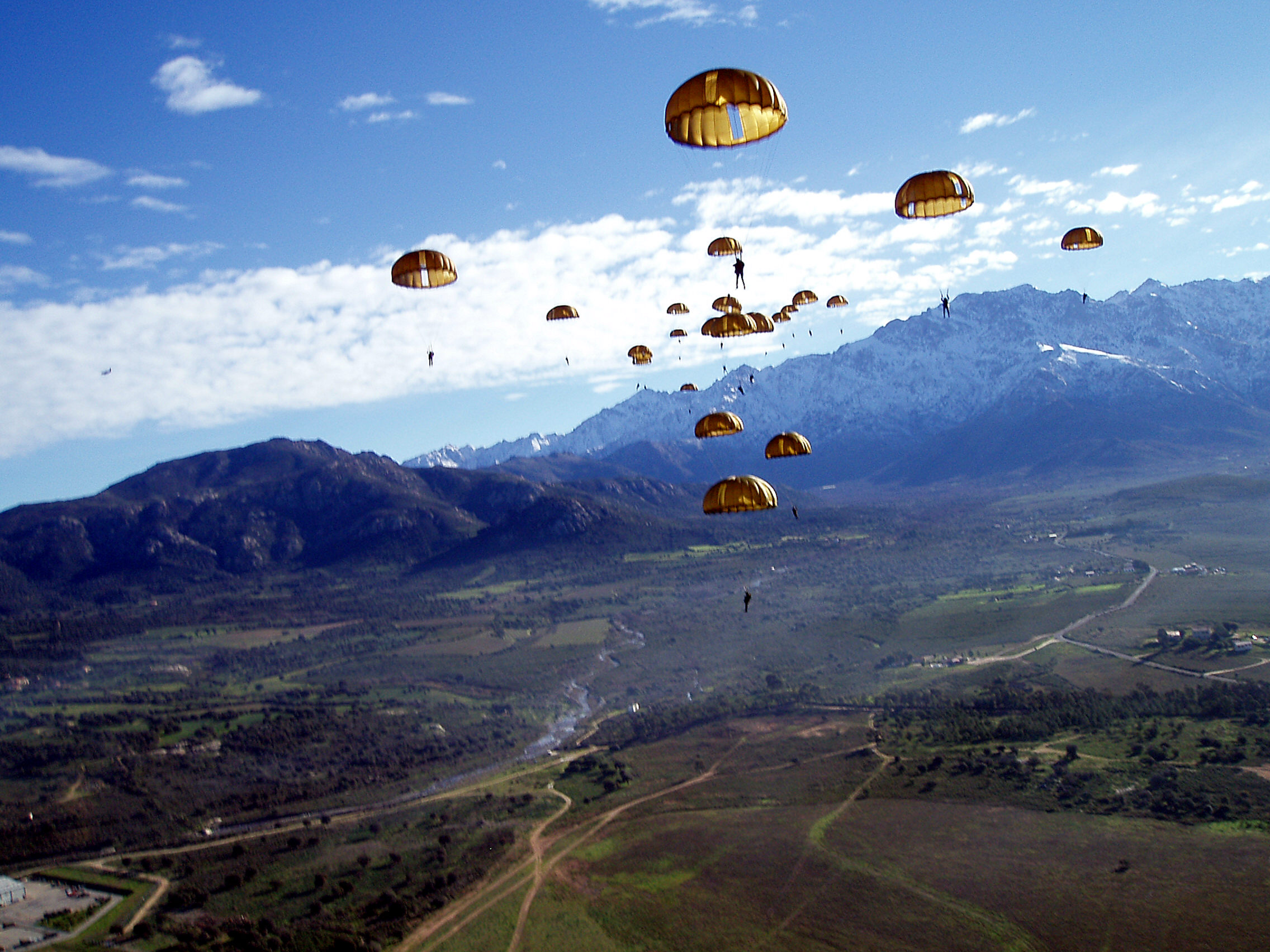
2ème REP paratroopers jumping over Calvi Drop Zone

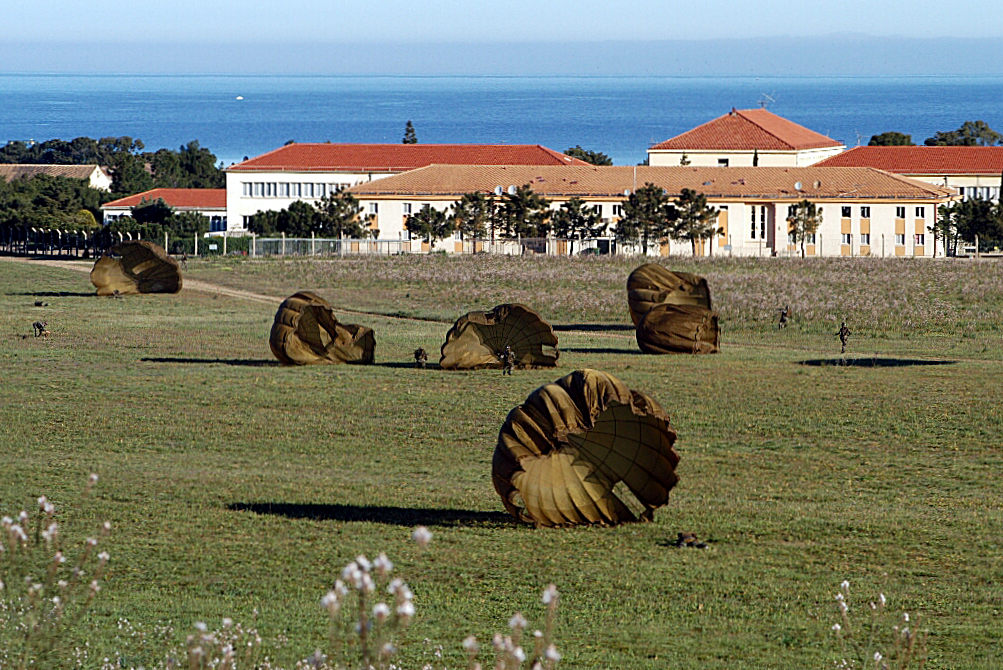
2ème REP paratroopers landing on Calvi Drop Zone during a training course

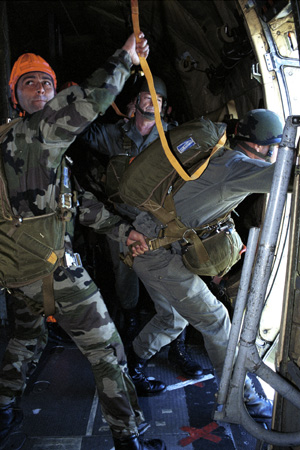
2ème REP paratroopers jumping from a C-160
