= Operation Épaulard I =

French military operation during the Lebanese Civil War

Operation Épaulard 1 (Operation Orca 1) was a military operation undertaken on the behalf of the 2nd Foreign Parachute Regiment to land soldiers in Beirut, Lebanon on 21 August 1982, during the Lebanese Civil War.

They were part of the Multinational Force in Lebanon, a multinational force including United States Armed Forces, Italian Armed Forces and British Armed Forces, which aimed to intervene in the widening conflict in Lebanon and protect French assets and civilians.

== See also ==
- 31st Brigade (France)
- Foreign Legion Groupment
- List of French paratrooper units
