= French Forces in Germany =

French military occupational forces in post-WWII Germany and West Germany

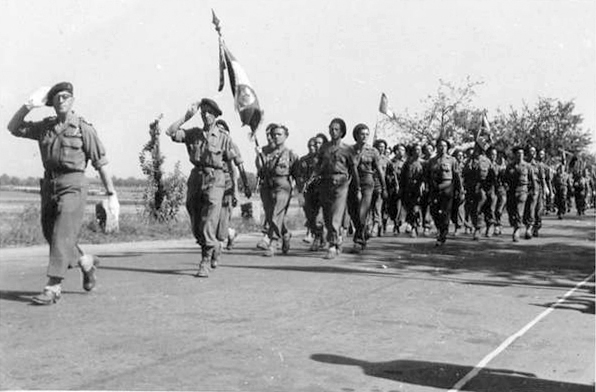
Paratroopers of the 1er groupement de choc parading in Ravensburg, French-occupied Germany, in the summer of 1945.

French military forces were stationed in Germany after the surrender of Germany after the end of World War II; France was one of four Allied powers allocated an occupation zone. The French occupation zone (French: Troupes d'occupation en Allemagne [TOA], lit. 'occupation troops in Germany') existed from the end of the war until 10 August 1949. Subsequently, the French military stationed forces in West Germany (French: Forces Françaises en Allemagne [FFA]) with its headquarters in Baden-Baden during the Cold War.

== History ==
The makeup of the FFA from 1950 to 1990 varied according to the demands being made on French military forces serving elsewhere. For example, the presence of large numbers of Algerian Muslims, both volunteers and conscripts, in the French Army at the beginning of the Algerian War, in 1954, raised increasing concerns regarding divided loyalties and the danger of defection with weapons. Accordingly, the majority of Algerian tirailleur (infantry) units were deployed to West Germany, replacing Metropolitan French troops for service in North Africa.

The Franco-German Brigade was created on 12 January 1989.

On 30 August 1993, with the end of the Cold War and the collapse of the Soviet Union, the designation of these forces changed to "French Forces stationed in Germany" (FFSA) and most of the forces were withdrawn to France or disbanded. Following another reorganization in 1999, the designation of the forces changed again and became known as the "French Forces and Civilian Elements stationed in Germany" (FFECSA).

== See also ==
- British Army of the Rhine
