= Bernard Janvier =

French general

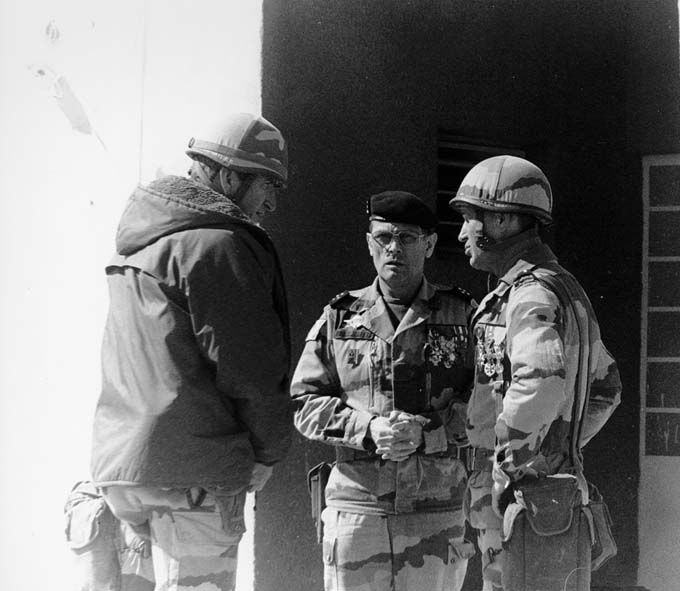
- Janvier (right) with Général de corps d'armée Michel Roquejoffre (centre) at As Salman, Iraq, on 10 March 1991
- Born: 16 July 1939 (age 87); La Voulte-sur-Rhône, France
- Military career
- Allegiance: France
- Branch: French Army; French Foreign Legion
- Service years: 1957–1999
- Rank: Général d'armée
- Commands: United Nations Protection Force; Division Daguet; 2nd Foreign Parachute Regiment 2^{e} REP
- Conflicts: Algerian War; Lebanese Civil War; Operation Épaulard I Multinational Force in Lebanon; Gulf War; Bosnian War
- Awards: Grand Officer of the Legion of Honour; Commander of the National Order of Merit; Croix de guerre des théâtres d'opérations extérieures Cross for Military Valour

Bernard Janvier (born 16 July 1939) is a former general of the French Army who served in the French Foreign Legion, primarily spearheading and putting in place effective resolving forces.

Janvier first took part in the Algerian War. He then spearheaded at the head of the 2nd Foreign Parachute Regiment 2^{e} REP in a peacekeeping mission in Lebanon. He was later designated as the commander of Division Daguet during the Gulf War. Four years later, he was assigned to UNPROFOR in charge of peacekeeping during the Bosnian War.

== Early life ==
Janvier's father Pierre, was an officer in the gendarmerie. Bernard conducted his studies at the Orange College, at schools in Nice and Algeria and the University of Rennes.

== Military career ==
Admitted to the École militaire interarmes at Coetquidan, on 1 October 1958, in quality of a Saint-Cyrien, « Général Bugeaud », he conducted his course application at the infantry school in Nîmes, on 15 September 1960.

On 1 December 1960 he joined the center of perfection of the infantry cadres 2 at Philippeville in Algeria, then was assigned on 1 January 1961 to the 1st battalion of the 1st Tirailleurs Regiment in quality as a commando chief.

Assigned to the 1st Foreign Regiment 1^{e} RE during July 1962, he was assigned on 1 August 1962 to the 2nd Foreign Parachute Regiment 2^{e} REP, regiment with which he conducted a tour in North Africa from August 1962 to September 1964. From 1964 to 1967, he served in Madagascar and at the Comoros at the corps of the 3rd Foreign Infantry Regiment 3^{e} REI, successively as assistant officer in a combat unit then a corps general staff headquarters officer (French: officier d'état-major au corps). He was promoted to the rank of Captain on 1 January 1967. Repatriated, he followed the Captain's course at the infantry application school, then the 33rd promotion of the generals staff headquarters school in quality as a candidate, as of 1 December 1968.

He commanded from 1968 to 1970, a company of the 9th Parachute Chasseur Regiment 9^{e} RCP, then from 1970 to 1972, as a company officer at the École spéciale militaire de Saint-Cyr at Saint-Cyr Coëtquidan. Following, he occupied at the corps of the school, the functions of assistant chief of general information and general military formation during two years. Candidate at the 88th promotion of superior war school, from September 1974 to May 1976, he served later, from June 1976 to August 1978, as an officer treating the bureau of personnel effectifs of the general staff headquarters of the French Army. He was promoted to Chef de bataillon (Commandant – Major) on 1 October 1974.

Successively, assigned as bureau chief of instruction and operations, then second commanding officer at the 2nd Foreign Parachute Regiment 2^{e} REP, from August 1978 to September 1981, he participated to « Operation Tacaud » (French: Opération Tacaud) in Tchad in quality as the inter-arm group commandant « Phœnix », from November 1979 to April 1980. He received his Lieutenant-colonel rank ("galons") on 1 October 1978.

In 1981, he was assigned as general staff headquarters officer of the general inspection of the French Army (French: officier d'état-major à l'inspection générale de l'armée de terre). Designated as regimental commander of the 2nd Foreign Parachute Regiment 2^{e} REP at Calvi, in 1982, he spearheaded the regiment in « Operation Épaulard I », within the cadre force of the Multinational Force in Lebanon from August to September 1982, in Beirut, Lebanon, charged in repatriating President Arafat. He was accordingly promoted to the rank of Colonel on 1 October 1982. He then participated to « Operation Manta » (French: Opération Manta) in Tchad, as commandant in the inter-arm group from January to May 1984.

From 1984 to 1987, he exercised the functions of section chief of personnel, in the bureau of personnel-effectif at the general staff headquarters of the French Army. On 1 August 1987 he was the assistant general commanding officer of the 6th Light Armoured Division 6^{e} DLB, at Nîmes, and on 1 March 1988 he was admitted to the 1st section of officer generals.

On 1 July 1989 he was the chief of the division of the organization and logistics at the general staff headquarters of the Armies (French: l'état-major des armées).

In May 1990, he commanded « Operation Requin » (French: Requin) at Port-Gentil in Gabon. From 7 February to 30 April 1991 he commanded Division Daguet in Saudi Arabia, then Iraq. At this title, he had under his commandment 4300 U.S. soldiers. He was promoted the Général de division on 1 April 1991.

On 1 May 1991 he was designated in charge of missions near the chief of the general staff headquarters of the Armies (French: général chef d'état-major des armées) before assuming command of the 6th Light Armoured Division 6^{e} DLB, at Nîmes, from 1 June 1991 until 5 September 1993.

He was designated as chief of the general staff headquarters of the inter-arm operational planning (French: Chef de l'état-major interarmées de planification opérationnelle), on 6 December 1993. He was accordingly elevated to the rank designation of Général de corps d'armée on 1 July 1994.

On 1 February 1995 he was placed at the disposition of the Chief of Staff of the French Army (French: Chef d'état-major de l'armée de terre) and received on 1 March 1995 the chief commandment of the peacekeeping force of the united Nations for ex-Yugoslavia and simultaneously, assured the in second commandment functions of the force placed for the peace plan in Bosnia (Implementation Force, IFOR).

Towards the end of the mission, he was placed at the disposition of Chief of Staff of the French Army, on 19 February 1996. In July 1996 he was nominated as a member of the superior council of the French Army (French: membre du conseil supérieur de l'armée de terre).

On 1 September 1996 he was nominated as director of the Institute of High Studies of National Defense (French: Institut des hautes études de la défense nationale, IHEDN) and of the Center of High Military Studies (French: centre des hautes études militaires, CHEM), of the superior military teachings. He received his 5th Star on 1 July 1998 and joined the 2nd section of officer generals on 1 January 1999.

== Role in events surrounding the Srebrenica massacre ==
On 16 November 1995, the International Association for the Prevention of Genocide, Crimes Against Humanity and War Crimes (AICG) applied to indict General Janvier for:

repeatedly and systematically impeding the necessary assistance to protect both the safe area of Srebrenica and the populations present there since 1992
and, for failing to support the Dutch peacekeeping forces that were stationed around Srebrenica.

It has been alleged that an agreement was reached in June 1995, during a meeting between General Janvier and Ratko Mladić, that airpower would not to be used if the Serbs freed the dozens of UN soldiers taken hostage a month earlier.

«Je n'ai jamais entendu parler d'un tel accord» – En Français

"(I have never heard of such an accord)" – Translated to English

In 2001, he was interrogated by the French Investigative Commission (French: Commission d'Enquête Française) on the Srebrenica massacre for his role in refusing the use of airpower requested by the Dutch Battalion charged with defending the enclave.

== Recognitions and honours ==

- Grand Officier of the Légion d'Honneur (1996)
- Commandeur of the Légion d'Honneur (1991)
- Officier of the Légion d'Honneur (1986)
- Chevalier of the Légion d'Honneur (1997)
- Commandeur de l'ordre national du Mérite (1990)
- Officier de l'ordre national du Mérite (1980)
- Croix de guerre des théâtres d'opérations extérieures (1 citation at the orders of the entire army)
- Croix de la Valeur militaire (5 citations out of which one at the orders of the entire army)
- Chevalier of the Ordre du Mérite Agricole (1984)
- Medaille d'Outre-Mer (agrafe « Liban » (Lebanon), « Tchad » Tchad, « Moyen-Orient » Middle East)
- Médaille commémorative des opérations de sécurité et de maintien de l'ordre en Afrique du Nord (agrafes « Algérie »)
- Médaille commémorative française

On another hand, he is decorated with numerous Foreign decorations out of which:

- Legion of Merit (U.S.)
- Medal of King Faisal – Saudi Arabia (1991)
- Kuwait Liberation Medal (Kuwait)
- NATO Medal
- United Nations Medal
- Chevalier de l'Etoile de la Grande Comores (Knight Star of the Grande Comores – 1966)
- Croix du service méritoire canadien (Canadian Meritorious Service Cross)
- Order of the Croatian Trefoil

He was wounded on 14 December 1961 at Aïn Ogra (Algeria) by a mine blast.
