= Jeannou Lacaze =

Jeannou Lacaze
- Born: 11 February 1924; Huế, French Indochina
- Died: 1 August 2005 (aged 81)
- Military career
- Allegiance: France
- Branch: (France) French Army; French Foreign Legion
- Service years: 1944–1985
- Rank: Général d'armée
- Commands: 2nd Foreign Parachute Regiment; 2^{e} REP (1967); 11th Parachute Division; 11^{e} DP; CEMA (1981–1985)
- Wars/Campaigns: World War II; First Indochina War; Algerian War

Jeannou Lacaze (February 11, 1924 – August 1, 2005), was a French Général d'armée of the French Army and Chef d'État-Major des armées (1981–1985), who also served in the French Foreign Legion.

== Biography ==
=== Preliminary years ===
Jeannou Lacaze was born in French Indochina, the son of a colonial functionary and an annamite of Chinese origin. He studied in a French school in Bordeaux.

== Military career ==
=== 1944 to 1950 ===
At the age of twenty, in 1944, he joined the French Forces of the Interior FFI and participated to the liberation. Received at Saint-Cyr in 1945, he pursued the infantry school application at Auvours where he graduated in 1947.

Detached at from his commencement, he was assigned to the 1st Foreign Infantry Regiment at Kef in Tunisia, he then joined the 2nd Foreign Infantry Regiment 2^{e} REI in Indochina, where he served until 1951. Section chief of the 3rd battalion, he was severely wounded at the head of his section during an assault on the village of Ho Chi Minh, on 5 January 1948. Repatriated sanitary, he returned to the 2nd Foreign Infantry Regiment 2^{e} REI and was deployed for a second tour in Indochina War.

=== 1951 to 1979 ===
Returned to France in 1951, he was assigned to the Moroccan Tirailleurs Regiment (French: régiment de tirailleurs marocains). Following an assignment at the technical section of the French Army, he assumed command of the 129th Line Infantry Regiment in 1958 in Algeria.

In 1959, he was assigned the 11^{e} Régiment Parachutiste de Choc (French: 11^{e} Régiment Parachutiste de Choc).

Following a passage at the war school, he assumed command of the 2nd Foreign Parachute Regiment 2^{e} REP after colonel Paul Arnaud de Foïard (regimental commander of the 2^{e} REP in 1965) on 18 July 1967. He led his regiment to Tchad during Opération Épervier (French: Opération Épervier) in 1969. He operated equally in Togo and in the Ivory Coast, in order to ensure the permanence of the « pré carré » of France in Africa.

Having left the French Foreign Legion, je joined the secret service before assuming command of the 11th Parachute Division from 1977 to 1979. During his commandment, the 2nd Foreign Parachute Regiment 2^{e} REP intervened in Kolwezi in Zaire, and the French Army launched exterior theatre operations in Lebanon and Mauritania.

=== 1980 to 1985 ===
He won the confidence of the President of France Valéry Giscard d'Estaing who named him Military governor of Paris in 1980, and Chief of the general staff headquarters of the Armies on 1 February 1981, a couple of months before the election of François Mitterrand. The new President maintained him in his post until his legal retiring age at retirement in 1985, while he totalized forty one years of service.

Titular of the Volunteer combatant's cross and the Combatant's Cross, général Jeannou Lacaze is a Grand Officer of Légion d'honneur. He is decorated with the Cross for Military Valour with three stars and the Croix de guerre des théâtres d'opérations extérieures with one palm and two stars.

=== 1986 to 2005 ===
In 1986, he became the special counselor near the ministre français de la Défense for the military relations with the African countries having signed defense accords. He became the counselor of the several African Presidents : (Mobutu Sese Seko, Denis Sassou Nguesso and Félix Houphouet-Boigny) He went several times to Iraq before the Invasion of Kuwait in 1991 to sustain the promotion of French armament and French savoir-faire to the regime of Saddam Hussein.

He acted as a "character witness" during the trial of mercenary Bob Denard in 1999.

In 1989, he launched himself into politics. He was a European deputy from (French: député européen) from 1989 to 1994, under the etiquette of the National Centre of Independents and Peasants CNIP (French: Centre national des indépendants et paysans) before creating his own political party of the Independent Union (French: Union des indépendants) UDI. He exercised as well the honorary presidency association Paris solidarité métro (struggle against social exclusion). He was surnamed the « le sphinx », from the fact that barely rarely spoke and kept numerous intelligences from him. In 1995, he founded the Franco-Iraqi commercial Council, for armament promotion to Saddam Hussein.

He died on Monday 1 August 2005 at the age of 81, his funeral procession took place on 4 August in the cours d'honneur at Les Invalides in Paris.

== Recognitions and Honors ==
- Grand Officier of the Légion d'Honneur
- Grand Officier de l'ordre national du Mérite
- Volunteer combatant's cross
- Croix de guerre des théâtres d'opérations extérieures
- Combatant's Cross
- Croix de la Valeur Militaire
- Medaille d'Outre-Mer (clasps « Lebanon », « Tchad » )
- Médaille commémorative de la campagne d'Indochine
- Médaille commémorative des opérations de sécurité et de maintien de l'ordre en Afrique du Nord

Jeannou Lacaze was cited 6 times out of which one was at the orders of army. He is also the author of a book that appeared in 1991 "Le Président et le champignon" (The President and the "Mushroom"), where he exposed his conception of the defense of France, after the fall of communism.
