= Indochina Campaign Commemorative Medal =

French armed services medal honoring participation in the Indochina Campaign

Indochina Campaign commemorative medal
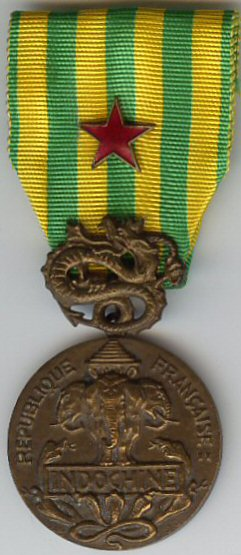
- Indochina Campaign commemorative medal (obverse) with single wound insignia
- Type: Campaign medal
- Awarded for: 90 days service between 16 August 1945 and 27 July 1954
- Presented by: France
- Eligibility: French citizens and foreign nationals fighting under the French flag
- Campaign: Indochina War
- First award: August 1, 1953

Highlights
- Total recipients: Coloniale Aloyse Rodolphe kennel
- Ribbon of the Indochina Campaign commemorative medal

Precedence
- Next (higher): 1943–1944 Italian campaign medal
- Next (lower): North Africa Security and Order Operations Commemorative Medal

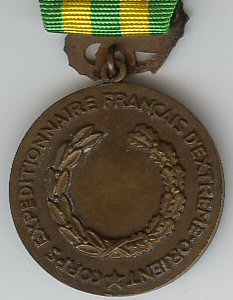
Reverse of the Indochina Campaign commemorative medal

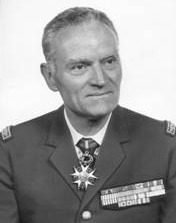
Brigadier General Pierre Vincent, a recipient of the Indochina Campaign commemorative medal

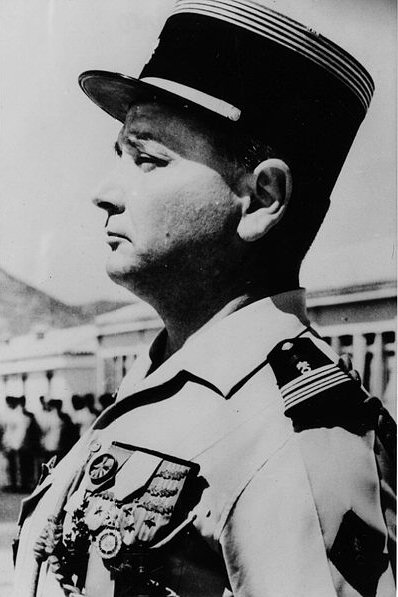
General Arnaud de Foiard, a recipient of the Indochina Campaign commemorative medal

The Indochina Campaign commemorative medal (French: Médaille commémorative de la campagne d'Indochine) was a French military decoration established on 1 August 1953 by decree 53-722 to recognize participation in the Indochina War by the members of the French Far East Expeditionary Corps, regular and reserve.

== History ==
The conflict in French Indochina started right after the end of World War II with the French forces initially under the command of general Philippe Leclerc. During the first eight years of the conflict, French and colonial troops received the Colonial Medal with the "EXTRÊME-ORIENT" (English: "FAR EAST") clasp, unfortunately, this award couldn't be earned by all in theater and outright excluded indigenous personnel. Politicians and generals alike petitioned the government for a dedicated commemorative award available to all participants under French command.

Even after the award was established, French soldiers still received the Colonial Medal with "EXTRÊME-ORIENT" clasp in addition to the Indochina Campaign commemorative medal.

== Statute ==
The Indochina Campaign commemorative medal was awarded to soldiers of the army, navy and air force involved, for a minimum of ninety days, in a regular or supplementary unit in the Indochina campaign between 16 August 1945 and 11 August 1954.

The medal could also be awarded to civilians, citizens of France or of the French Union, members of the Merchant navy or civil aviation, on board ships or as part of aircrews of air navigation aircraft, having ensured for a minimum period of ninety consecutive days, between the same aforementioned dates, troop or military equipment transport to or within Indochina.

The ninety-day minimum period of service in theater was waived for personnel injured during operations in theater or mentioned in dispatches during the campaign.

== Description ==
The Indochina Campaign commemorative medal was a 36mm in diameter circular medal struck from bronze. On its obverse at lower center, a 24mm wide by 5mm high rectangular panel bearing the relief inscription "INDOCHINE" (English: "INDOCHINA") supported by a seven headed naja, five of its heads being below the panel, two being above the upper corners, one on each side. Atop the panel, a three headed elephant surrounded by the relief semi circular inscription "RÉPUBLIQUE FRANÇAISE" (English: "FRENCH REPUBLIC") along the medal circumference.

On the reverse in relief, a 25mm in diameter wreath of laurels and oak leaves surrounded by the inscription "CORPS EXPÉDITIONNAIRE FRANÇAIS D'EXTRÊME-ORIENT" (English: "FRENCH FAR EAST EXPEDITIONARY CORPS") running along the entire medal circumference.

The ribbon suspension ring was adorned with a 20mm high by 25mm wide bronze twisted dragon. The ring passed through a loop atop the medal which hung from a 39mm wide green ribbon bearing four 5mm wide yellow stripes set 5mm apart starting 2mm from the edges.

== Notable recipients ==
- General Marcel Alessandri
- Surgeon General Valérie André
- Lieutenant Paul Brunbrouck
- Admiral Georges Cabanier
- General Paul Arnaud de Foïard
- General Paul Arnault
- General Marcel Bigeard
- Major Rudolf Eggs
- Master sergeant Marc Flament
- Lieutenant colonel Albert Fossey-François
- Lieutenant colonel Jules Gaucher
- General Maurice Henry
- Colonial Aloyse Rodolphe Kennel
- General Pierre Langlais
- General Paul Lardry
- General Philippe Leclerc de Hauteclocque
- General Renaud de Corta
- Major Hélie de Saint Marc
- General Raoul Salan
- Chief warrant officer Jean Trescases
- Major René de Salins
- General Maurice Schmitt
- Chief warrant officer Jo Sohet
- Lieutenant colonel Léo Vidou
- General Pierre Vincent

== See also ==
- Tonkin Expedition commemorative medal: French campaign medal for the Tonkin campaign
