= Jean-Pierre Bosser (army general) =

French military personnel

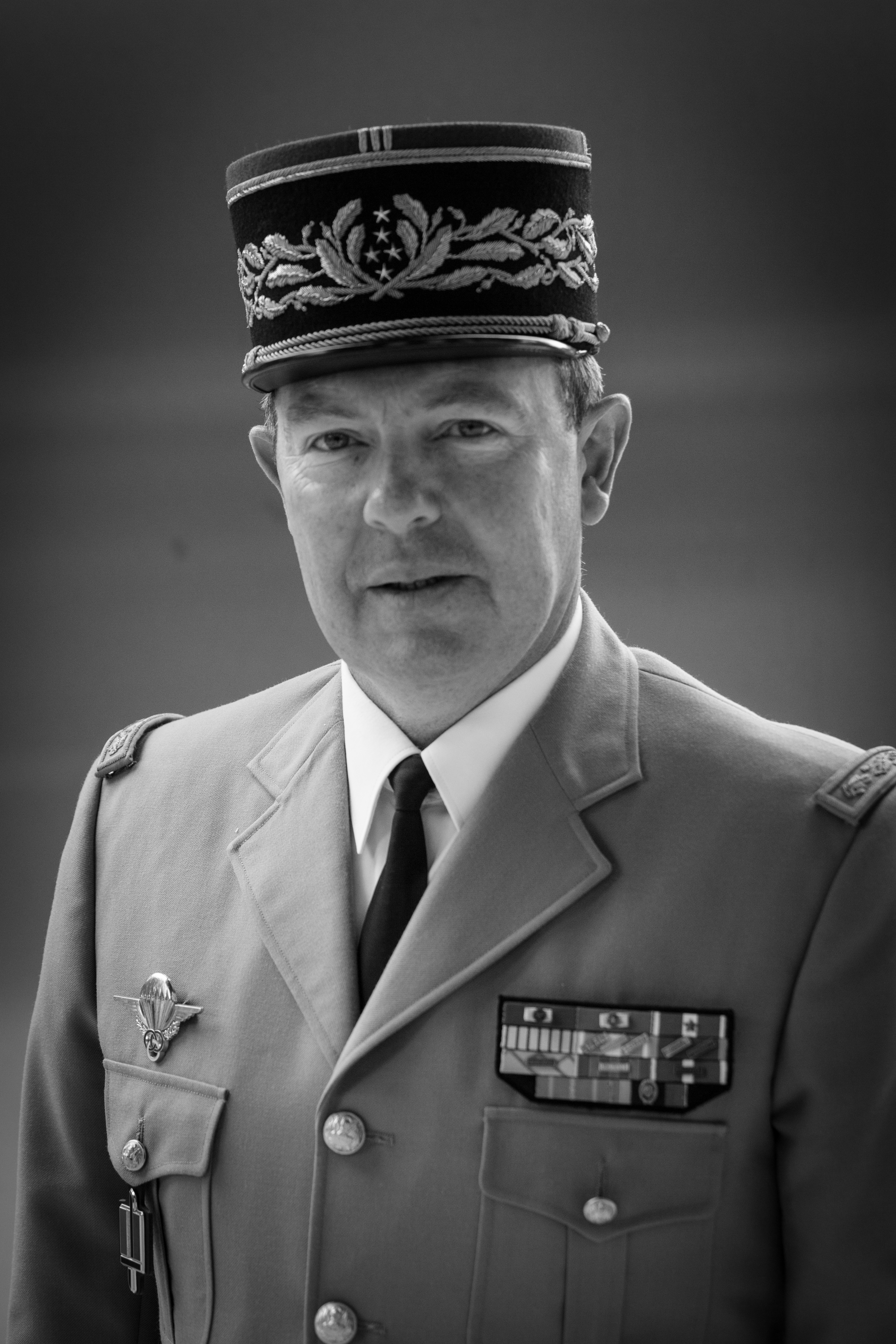
- General Bosser in September 2015

Chief of Staff of the Army
- In office 1 September 2014 – 31 July 2019
- Preceded by: Bertrand Ract-Madoux
- Succeeded by: Thierry Burkhard

Personal details
- Born: 14 November 1959 (age 66) Versailles, France
- Children: 2
- Education: École Spéciale Militaire; École de l'infanterie

Military service
- Allegiance: (France) French Republic
- Branch/service: French Army: Troupes de marine
- Years of service: 1979–2019
- Rank: Army general
- Unit: 8th Marine Infantry Parachute Regiment
- Commands: 8th Marine Infantry Parachute Regiment; 11th Parachute Brigade
- Battles/wars: Lebanese Civil War; Multinational Force in Lebanon; Chadian–Libyan conflict; Operation Manta; Opération Épervier; Kosovo War; Operation Trident; First Central African Civil War; Operation Boali

Jean-Pierre Bosser (born 14 November 1959) is a French Army General. He was Chief of Staff of the French Army from 1 September 2014 to 31 July 2019.

== Military career ==
Student of the Lycée militaire de Saint-Cyr, then the École spéciale militaire de Saint-Cyr (promotion Général Lasalle 1979-1981), he chose then the infantry application school at Montpellier.

He served in the 8th Marine Infantry Parachute Regiment 8^{e} RPIMa at Castres on three different occasions, as a section (platoon) chief and paratrooper instructor from 1982 to 1985, assistant officer then commandant of a company between 1986 and 1990, and finally after being nominated to colonel on 1 October 2000, in quality as a regimental commander from 2003 to 2011. Jean-Pierre Bosser was particularly renowned for becoming a paratrooper instructor, particularly at the 8th Parachute Regiment of the Troupes de marine, and participated to a dozen of exterior operations.

Between 1982 and 1990, he deployed to Lebanon at the corps of the Multinational Force in Lebanon since creation in September 1982, to Tchad for the launching of Operation Manta in 1983 then within the cadre of Opération Épervier in 1989, to Central African Republic in 1984 and 1986, and to Gabon in 1990 for the evacuation of French citizens from Port-Gentil. He also conducted simultaneously a technical military assistance mission for one year as a counselor of the para-commando battalion of Mauritania in 1985.

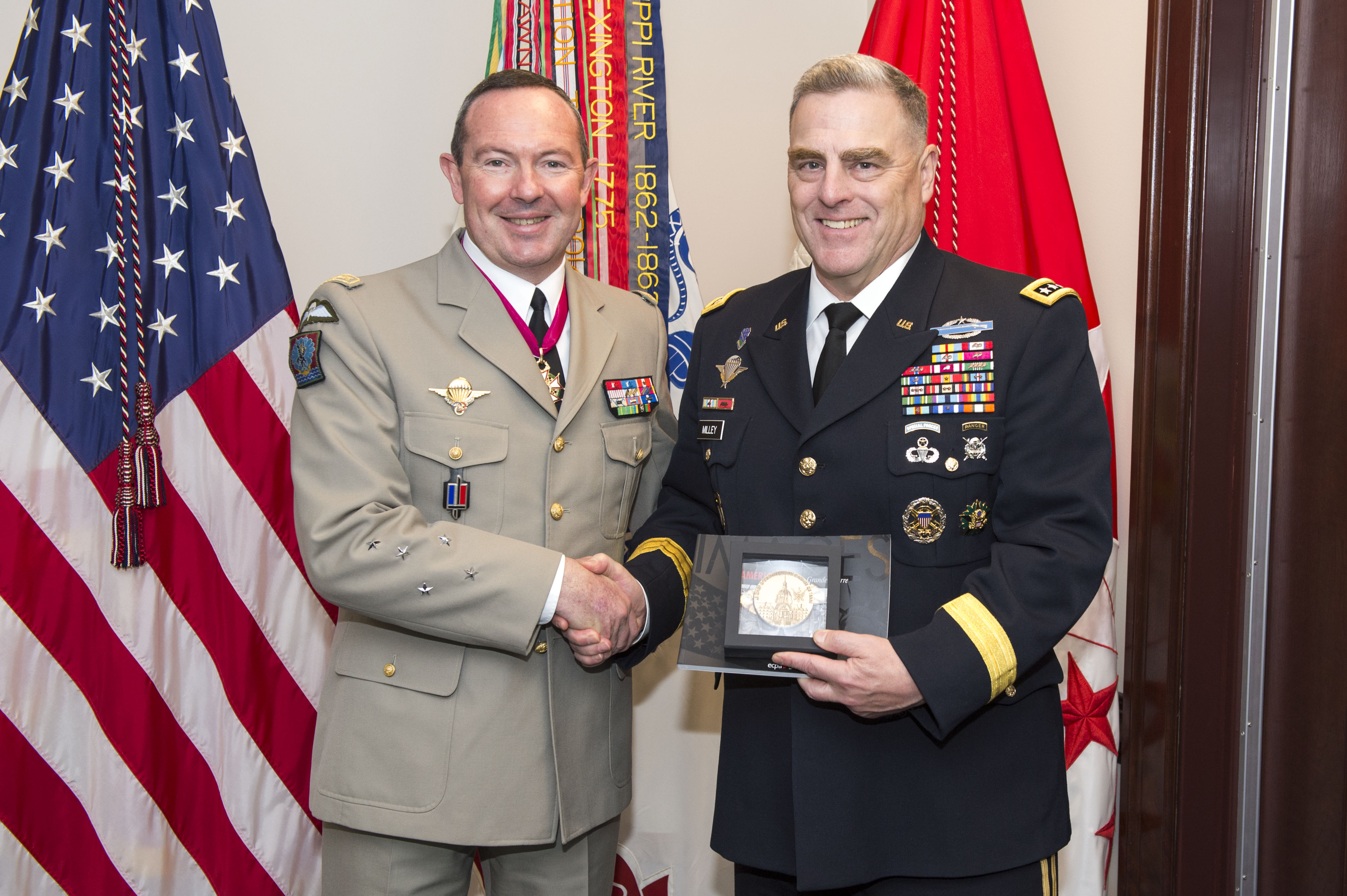
CSA General Mark A. Milley hosts CEMAT Général d'armée Jean-Pierre Bosser.

From 1990 to 1992, he occupied the post of chief of the operational center of the inter-arm general staff headquarters of the superior commandment of the New Caledonian Armed Forces (FANC). He was then engaged at the head of his regiment in Kosovo within the cadre of Operation Trident in 2002, then Central African Republic to open Operation Boali in 2003. Brevetted at the École de guerre in 1996, he served for five years at the bureau « études générales » of the Directorate of Military Personnel of the French Army (DPMAT) before assuming the command of the 8^{e} RPIMa. Then, from 2003 till 2005, he was designated as director of the student formations (DFE) of Écoles de Saint-Cyr Coëtquidan ESCC.

He joined again the DPMAT in quality as a bureau chief « Arme de mêlée », then bureau chief « études générales ». Nominated to Général de brigade on 1 August 2007, he became the assistant to the deputy chief of the general staff headquarters « ressources humaines » at the general staff headquarters of the French Army where he was confined with the functions of deputy chief of the general staff headquarters « performance-synthèse ». Elevated to the rank designation of général de corps d’armée, he became on 29 November 2012, the director of the Protection and Defense Security Directorate DPSD, while being responsible for one of the French Military Intelligence Subsidiaries.

On 9 July 2014, he was nominated by the Council of Ministers Chief of Staff of the French Army CEMAT, the highest function in the chain of command of the French Army. He assumed this post responsibility on 1 September 2014 along with the rank elevation designation of Général d'armée.

== Military ranks ==
Ranks attained in the French Army
Élève-officier (Note: First year of ESM Saint-Cyr)	Aspirant (Note: Second year of ESM Saint-Cyr)	Sous-lieutenant (Note: Third year of ESM Saint-Cyr)	Lieutenant (Note: Upon leaving ESM Saint-Cyr)	Capitaine	Chef de bataillon
1979	1980	1981	1982	?	?
Lieutenant-colonel	Colonel	Général de brigade	Général de division	Général de corps d'armée (Note: Not a rank, but a position and style)	Général d'armée
1 August 1995	1 October 2000	1 August 2007	1 August 2010	29 November 2012	1 September 2014

== Honours and decorations ==
Honours and decorations
National honours
Ribbon bar	Name	Date	Source
	Grand Officer of the National Order of the Legion of Honour	25 June 2019	
	Commander of the National Order of the Legion of Honour	13 July 2014	
	Officer of the National Order of the Legion of Honour	12 July 2009	
	Knight of the National Order of the Legion of Honour	7 September 1998	
	Commander of the National Order of Merit	4 November 2013	
	Officer of the National Order of Merit	26 November 2004	
	Knight of the National Order of Merit	28 July 1995	
Military decorations
Ribbon bar	Name		Source
	Cross for Military Valour - One bronze star (regiment level citation)		-
	Combatant's Cross		-
	Overseas Medal		-
	National Defence Medal - Gold grade		-
	Medal of the Nation's Gratitude		-
	French commemorative medal		-
	NATO Medal - Kosovo clasp		-
Foreign honours
Ribbon bar	Name	Country	Source
	Commander of the Legion of Merit	United States	
	Knight of the National Order of Merit	Mauritania	-
	Commander's Cross of the Order of Merit of the Federal Republic of Germany	Germany	-
	German Sports Badge - Gold grade, military	Germany	-
	Unidentified award	-	-
	Grand Cross of the Military Merit Order	United Arab Emirates	-
	Medal of Military Merit - 1st class	Portugal	-
Badges
Insignia	Name		
	Parachutist Monitor Badge		
	British Parachutist Badge		

Jean-Pierre Bosser is an Honorary Corporal (bestowed) of the French Foreign Legion.

== See also ==
- Hervé Charpentier
- Chief of the Defence Staff
- Bruno Dary
- Elrick Irastorza
- François Lecointre
- Benoit Puga
- 31st Brigade (France)
- Pierre de Villiers
