= Hervé Charpentier =

Hervé Charpentier

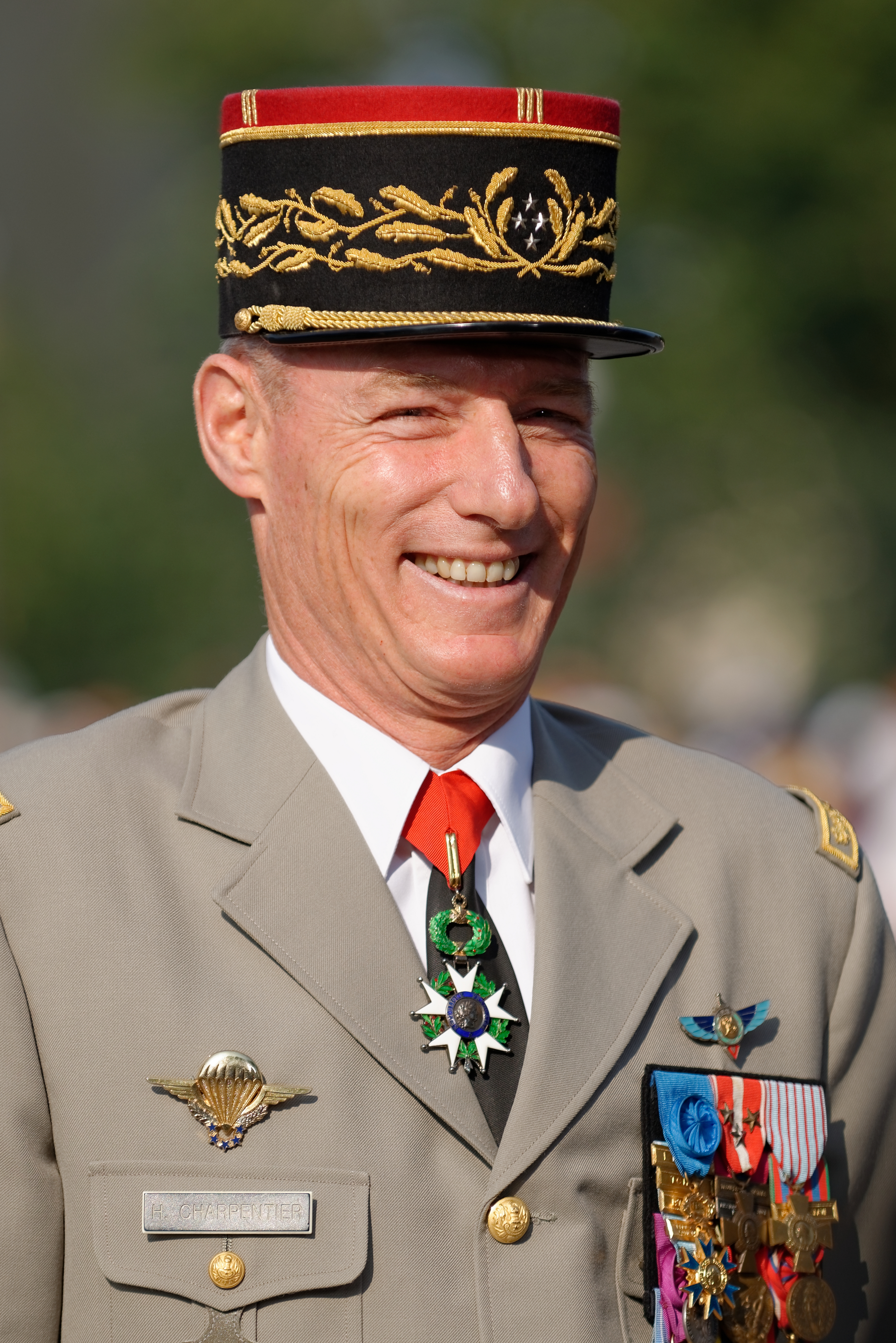
- Born: 19 September 1955 (age 71); Meknes, Morocco
- Military career
- Allegiance: France
- Branch: French Army; Marine Troops
- Service years: 1978 – 2015
- Rank: Général d'armée
- Units: Troupes de marine: 8th Marine Infantry Parachute Regiment 8^{e} RPIMa; 1st Marine Infantry Parachute Regiment 1^{er} RPIMa
- Commands: 6th Marine Infantry Battalion; 6^{e} BIMa; 9th Light Armoured Marine Brigade; 9^{e} B.L.B.Ma; Infantry School Application; Commandement des Forces Terrestres; CFT; Military governor of Paris
- Conflicts: Ex-Yugoslavia; Rwanda; Lebanon; Ivory Coast...

Hervé Charpentier is a Général d'armée of the French Army.

He is the 137th Military governor of Paris (French: Gouverneur militaire de Paris) from 1 August 2012 until 31 July 2015.

== Military career ==
he was admitted to Saint-Cyr in 1975, promotion « Captain Henri Guilleminot » (French: Henri Guilleminot). At the end of his scholarity, he chose to serve in the Marine infantry.

Nominated as a lieutenant in 1978 at the end of the Infantry Application School, he served first in the 8th Marine Infantry Parachute Regiment 8^{e} RPIMa until 1981, in quality as a section (platoon) chief (French: chef de section) of High Altitude Operational Operator (French: Chuteur Opérationnel). He accordingly participated to Operation Barracuda in the Central African Republic (1979) and Operation Saintonge at Vanuatu (1980).

He joined then the 23rd Marine Infantry Battalion (French: 23^{e} Bataillon d'Infanterie de Marine) of Dakar as a section (platoon) chief then assistant (French: adjoint) officer of the infantry company. He was promoted to a captain in 1982.

Assigned in 1983, he returned to the metropolis and joined the 3rd Marine Infantry Parachute Regiment 3^{e} RPIMa where he served as an operations officer during Operation Diodon 4 in Lebanon then as commanding officer of the 2nd infantry company from 1984 to 1986. He then joined Zaire as a counselor of the commandant of the 312th battalion of the 31st Zairian Parachute Brigade.

Promoted to Chef de bataillon (Commandant - Major) in 1988, he was assigned to the general staff headquarters of the French Army (French: l'état-major de l'Armée de Terre) at Paris before being admitted to the French War School (French: école de guerre) in 1991.

Designated as a lieutenant-colonel, he joined from 1993 to 1995, the 1st Marine Infantry Parachute Regiment 1^{er} RPIMa as an operations bureau chief. He participated accordingly to Operation Balbuzard in ex-Yugoslavia and Opération Turquoise in Rwanda.

In June 1997, he assumed the command of the 6th Marine Infantry Battalion 6^{e} BIM (French: 6^{e} Bataillon d'Infanterie de Marine) and was promoted to colonel in December. He was admitted as auditor (French: auditeur) at the CHEM (French: Centre des Hautes études Militaires) and the Institute of IHEDN (French: Institut des Hautes études de la Défense Nationale) in 2001.

This career made him knowledgeable about the African Continent. Accordingly, in July 2002, he joined the Military Cabinet of the Minister of Defense (French: Cabinet Militaire du Ministre de la Défense) to manage the « Africa and Middle East » department cell.

Nominated to Général de brigade on 1 July 2005, he assumed on the same date the commandment of the 9th Light Armoured Marine Brigade 9^{e} B.L.B.Ma and was engaged at this title, as operations assistant during Opération Licorne in the Ivory Coast. Two years later, he assumed command of the Infantry Application School then was nominated to Général de division in 2008.

He was elevated to the rank designation of Général de corps d'armée on 1 July 2010 and assumed command of the Commandement des Forces Terrestres.

He was nominated on 1 August 2012 as officer General of the Defense and Security Zone of Paris, Military governor of Paris and Commandant of the zone terre Île-de-France.

Général Charpentier is the President of the Administrative Council of the Musée de l'Armée and member of the Administration Council of the Saint-Cyrienne.

On 1 July 2015 he was elevated to the rank designation of Général d'armée. He replaced Général de corps d'armée Bruno Le Ray (French: Bruno Le Ray) on the following 31 July.

== Recognitions and Honors ==
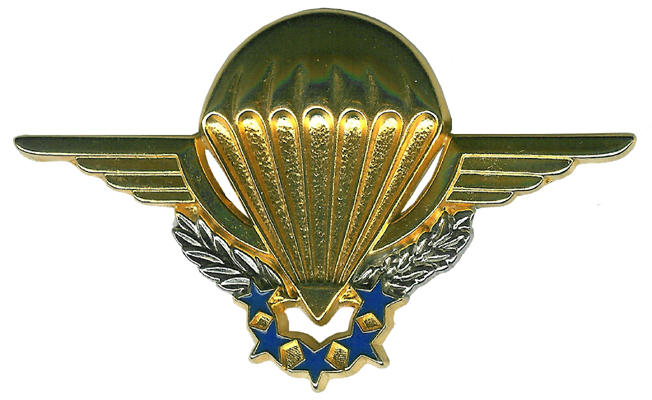

- French HALO Operator Badge (Chuteur Opérationnel)
- Commandeur de la Légion d'honneur
- Grand Officer de l'ordre national du Mérite
- Croix de la Valeur militaire (2 étoiles en argent et 1 en bronze)
- Croix du combattant
- Médaille d'Outre-Mer
- Médaille de la Défense nationale (silver medal)
- Médaille de reconnaissance de la Nation
- Médaille commémorative française
- Officier de l'ordre de Léopold (Belgium)
- Chevalier de l'Order of the Equatorial Star (Gabon)
- Officier de l'ordre de mérite de Centrafrique
- Médaille MISAB
- Médaille de la gendarmerie du Gabon
- Croix d'honneur de la Bundeswehr (gold)
- Grand Croix de l'ordre du mérite militaire espagnol (white ribbon)
- About twelve other awards and decorations.

== See also ==
- Jean Brette
- Jean-Claude Coullon
- Jean Louis Roué
- 31st Brigade
- Elrick Irastorza
- Bruno Dary
- Benoit Puga
- Jean-Pierre Bosser
- Pierre de Villiers
- François Lecointre
