= Philippe Erulin =

French military officer

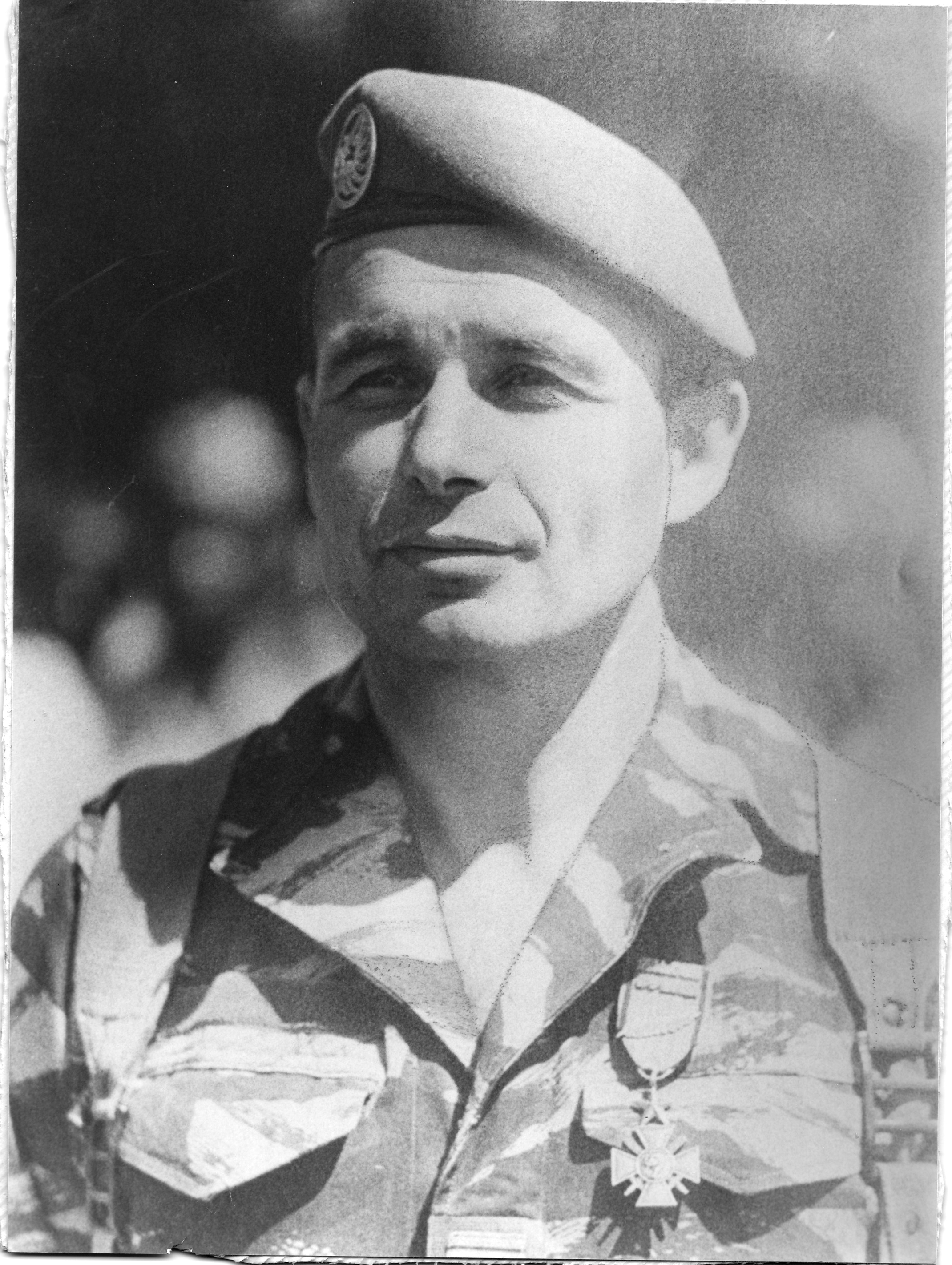
- Born: 5 July 1932; Dole, France
- Died: 26 September 1979 (aged 47); Paris, France
- Military career
- Allegiance: France
- Branch: French Army; French Foreign Legion
- Service years: 1952–1979
- Rank: Colonel
- Commands: 2nd Foreign Parachute Regiment 2^{e} REP
- Conflicts: Algerian War; Shaba II; Battle of Kolwezi
- Awards: Commander of the Légion d'honneur Croix de la Valeur militaire

Philippe Louis Edmé Marie François Erulin (5 July 1932 – 26 September 1979) was a senior French military officer. He is best known as the Colonel Commandant of the 2nd Foreign Parachute Regiment 2^{e} REP, who directed the military intervention in Zaïre during the Shaba II conflict against rebels of the Congolese National Liberation Front (FLNC).

His regiment was the success in the Battle of Kolwezi which resulted in the rescuing of hostages who were held hostage by the FLNC rebels. However, Erulin was later accused of having used torture during the Algeria War; an accusation that remains unsubstantiated and controversial. He came from a family of renowned officers and military traditions.

== Early life ==
=== Family ===
His grandfather, Lieutenant-colonel Louis-Joseph Erulin, as well as his father, Lieutenant-colonel André Erulin, were both officers, both having graduated from Saint-Cyr, having each served in a World War. His father received the Croix de Guerre 1939-1945, Croix de guerre des théâtres d'opérations extérieures, Resistance Medal with rosette, and was appointed a Commandeur of the Legion of Honour. He was killed in Indochina in 1951 at the head of Mobile Group 4 under the orders of Général Jean de Lattre de Tassigny who stated while presiding over pronouncing the Military Honours:

He left us a big example. Because he was not only the one whom one can immediately trust, he was one of those rare men who are totally true - who give confidence in man's greatness, in his virtue.

His brother Dominique stated that his parents gave them a very strict education and that at the death of his father, Philippe Erulin inherited a part of the family responsibilities.

== Military career ==
=== Officer of the 1^{er} RCP ===
Engaged for 8 years at the ESMIA promotion « French Union » on September 29, 1952, Philipe Erulin followed the course of the school of infantry application (French: École d’application de l’infanterie) until January 1955. He was assigned to the 1^{e} RCP from 1954 to 1959 first at Bône, then at Philippeville, with the rank of lieutenant.

He served with the 1^{e} RCP in the Algerian War (French: guerre d'Algérie) and Operation Musketeer (French: Opération Mousquetaire). In Algeria, he commanded a section which served mainly in the Aurès and in Kabylie. He was wounded twice, once seriously, and was cited 4 times. He was made a Chevalier of the Legion of Honor at the age of 26.

He participated in the Battle of Algiers (French: bataille d'Alger) in which his regiment was engaged in 1957. He was with André Charbonnier, one of the two officers that arrested Maurice Audin (French: Maurice Audin), Algerian militant communist whose party was engaged in the armed struggle with the FLN, on June 10, 1957.

He was assigned to the 6th company of the 153rd Motorized Infantry Regiment 153^{e} RIM at Bône in Algeria and assumed command of the company on June 1, 1962. The 153^{e} RIM was repatriated from Algeria and became mechanized and garrisoned at Mutzig on January 4, 1963.

On July 1, 1964, he joined the general staff headquarters of the 6th Mechanized Brigade.

Destined for a deployment overseas, he was assigned as a quality chief at the operations bureau of the 3rd Foreign Infantry Regiment 3^{e} REI at Diego Suarez on August 2, 1966, as well as the general staff headquarters of the regiment. He was promoted to the rank of chef de bataillon on July 1, 1968. Repatriated by end of tour on August 12, 1968, he was assigned to the ninth administrative regional company.

In November, he joined the inspection of the infantry then integrated the 84th promotion of the Superior War School on September 1, 1970.

==== Controversy on assumed acts of torture ====
Henri Alleg (French: Henri Alleg), a communist militant, director of Alger républicain (French: Alger républicain), stopped right after Audin in the same operation, accused Charbonnier and Erulin of having tortured him under the orders of Captain Roger Faulques. He published in 1958 La Question (French: La Question), a testimony denouncing torture during the Algerian war of independence (French: torture pendant la guerre d'Algérie). On the services which were applicable on him, Henri Alleg talked about a « torturing lieutenant », trying to refer to Philippe Erulin.

Pierre Vidal-Naquet (French: Pierre Vidal-Naquet) reported the testimony of Georges Hadjad, another communist militant, who was trying to confirm having seen « lieutenant Erulin » and other officers with Audin in the space where the latter was tortured. All denied torture.

In 1978, the guest of the television broadcast Les Dossiers de l'écran (French: Les Dossiers de l'écran), René Andrieu (French: René Andrieu), also editor chief of L'Humanité (French: L'Humanité), profited from the resounding of Operation Kolwezi, to accuse Philippe Erulin to have been the torturer of Henri Alleg, the latter, still insisting as mentioned in his book. The Ministre de la Défense Yvon Bourges (French: Yvon Bourges), announced in a statement that he was scandalized by the behavior of René Andrieu, while the rescue intervention in Shaba was still on going in action. A little later, Jean Planchais (French: Jean Planchais) profited from the death of Colonel Philipe Erulin to criticize the amnesty and silence on the torture during that war (French: la torture durant cette guerre). René Andrieu was condemned for defamation (without compensation for the offence of, the Court, establishing accordingly case-law (French: établissant ainsi une jurisprudence)), and the affair inspired the film A Captain's Honor (French: L'Honneur d'un capitaine). The family of Colonel Erulin launched accordingly several legal accusations while winning some.

In 2014, Jean-Charles Deniau (French: Jean-Charles Deniau), who obtained the undisclosed topics of général Paul Aussaresses (French: Paul Aussaresses) confirmed that Audin and Alleg were tortured, but did not cite or mention Philipe Erulin as a torturer of these last two.

=== Commandant of the 2^{e} REP ===
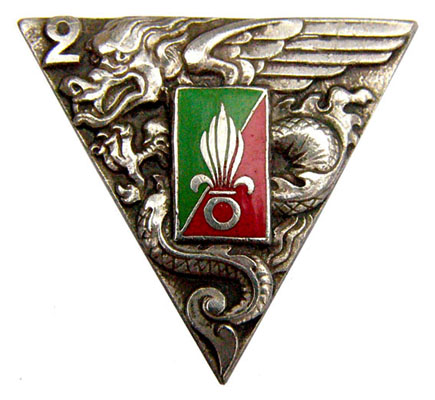
2nd Foreign Parachute Regiment, 2^{e} REP

On July 9, 1976, Philipe Erulin assumed the command of the 2nd Foreign Parachute Regiment at Calvi with the designated rank of Colonel.

==== Battle of Kolwezi ====
On May 17, the President of France Valéry Giscard d'Estaing (French: Valéry Giscard d'Estaing) decided on an operation on Zaïre where Katanga rebels were committing massacres and apprehending hostages.

Making his way out of Calvi with his regiment on May 19, 1978, after a transit in Kinshasa, he jumped spearheading 700 paratroopers organized in two waves on Kolwezi (French: Kolwezi). The town which consisted of 2000 European civilians (principally Belgian and French), was liberated after violent combats with the rebels. The regiment endured the loss of 5 men, twenty legionnaires being wounded. On June 6, the President of Zaïre Mobutu Sese Seko (French: Mobutu Sese Seko) gave the accolade to colonels Yves Gras (French: Yves Gras) (military attaché of Zaire) and Philippe Erulin: the Franco-Belge intervention equally permitted to consolidate his regime.

On June 7, they returned to Calvi. The following week, Valéry Giscard d'Estaing rendered them a visit to congratulate the operation during an arms ceremony at Bastia. Under his orders, during this battle, served notably Benoît Puga, Bruno Dary and Ante Gotovina, who according to L'Humanité, also served to drive Erulin. The same journal confirmed that his brother Dominique (who associated later with Ante Gotovina) participated to the battle, while the latter had already left the army, following the Algerian War.

Assigned to the general staff headquarters of the French Army EMAT in July 1978, he died on September 26, 1979, from a ruptured aneurysm in Paris.

==== Hommages to the operation of Kolwezi ====
Thirty years later, Valéry Giscard d'Estaing returned to Calvi and confirmed that the operation of Kolwezi has become a reference, a school for all, military and political directors, which would have to prepare what is referred today as exterior operations. The operation of Kolwezi is actually taught in military schools. For Jean Guisnel (French: Jean Guisnel), this operation also marked the end of defiance of the political power towards the French Foreign Legion following the general's putsch.

== Citations and homages ==
Philipe Erulin was cited at the orders of the Armed forces, on July 17, 1978:

Commandant of the 2nd Foreign Parachute Regiment, conducted from May 19 to May 27 with a total success of airborne operations related to protection rescue of populations of Kolwezi (Republic of Zaire). Dropped in difficult conditions, he trained his regiment vigorously on the assault and attained all objectives in less than an hour, liberating by a coup of this remarkable notion the imprisoned European populations held for a week and saving hundreds of human lives. The following day, he pursued with caution and exceptionally swiftly the clearing operations in the region of Kolwezi, delivering and rescuing as well other hostages. Due to his military values, he allowed the 2nd Foreign Parachute Regiment to inscribe a magnificent victory which honors the French Foreign Legion and the paratroopers.

The Commandeur of the Légion d’honneur was personally awarded to him on September 29, 1978, by the President of the Republic Valéry Giscard d’Estaing.

On May 21, 2008, the President of the Republic Nicolas Sarkozy pronounced the following at the occasion of a commemorative arms ceremony marking 30 years of exterior operations in the Honor courtyard of the Invalides:

30 years ago almost day to day, the legionnaires of the 2^{e} REP commanded by Colonel Philipe Erulin, wrote at Kolwezi, one of the most beautiful pages of military history of our country, by taking part to an airborne operation of a grand scale, one of the most important surely since World War II... The events of Kolwezi were moments of truths for all, from the Chief of the Armed Forces to the paratroopers on the ground engaged in operations theatre. All were up to the task. All were dutiful to their country. All front faced the situation. None abandoned (..).

The extract by Général de division Jeannou Lacaze, Inspector of the Infantry, and future Chef d'état-major des armées (CEMA) during the pronunciation of Colonel Erulin's Military Honors:

Madame, the Armed Forces also here in mourning, today, and in particular all these parachute units and the French Foreign Legion which your husband constituted one of the prow figures....Remain assured that, like you, like your children, we will keep of Philippe Erulin the souvenir of a generous man and also the image of the French officer which he incarnated all his life, and which he very well symbolized for millions of personnel in the military operation on Kolwezi to which his name will forever remain attached to. Colonel Erulin, generations of officers, despite your brief career, were marked by your example. I know that they will not forget it.

=== State of service ===
- September 29, 1952 - promotion Union française of the EMSIA
- February 1, 1953 - caporal
- April 1, 1953 - sergent
- October 1, 1954 - sous-lieutenant
- October 1959 to April 1960 - Infantry application school of Saint-Maixent (1st company, 2nd section)
- January 20, 1955 - assigned to the 1st Parachute Chasseur Regiment at Bône then Philippeville
- October 1, 1956 - lieutenant
- April 1, 1961 - captain
- June 1, 1962 - received the commandment of the 6th company of the 153rd Motorized Infantry Regiment
- 1963 - 1964 - commandant of the 1st company of the 153rd mechanized infantry regiment - quartier Moussy at Mutzig
- July 1, 1968 - chef de bataillon
- October 1, 1973 - lieutenant-colonel
- July 1, 1976 - Colonel
- July 1, 1976 - received commandment of the 2nd Foreign Parachute Regiment 2^{e} REP

=== Recognitions and Honors ===
- Commandeur of the Légion d'Honneur (1978)
- Officier of the Légion d'Honneur (1975)
- Chevalier of the Légion d'Honneur (1959)
- Croix de la Valeur militaire (4 citations)
- Croix du combatant
- Overseas Medal with agrafe « Zaïre »
- Chevalier of the Ordre du Mérite Agricole
- Médaille commémorative du Moyen-Orient (1956)
- Médaille commémorative des opérations de sécurité et de maintien de l'ordre en Afrique du Nord with agrafe « Algérie » (1958)
- Insigne des blessés militaires (2 stars)
- Médaille de bronze de la Jeunesse et des Sports
- Croix de la bravoure militaire zaïroise avec palme (Cross of the military bravery of Zaire with palm)

== See also ==
- Pierre Segrétain
- Rémy Raffalli
- Pierre Jeanpierre
- Jacques Lefort, regimental commander 2nd Foreign Parachute Regiment 2^{e} REP (1958)
- Pierre Darmuzai, 2^{e} REP (1960)
- Saharan Méharistes Companies (méharistes sahariennes)
- Paul Arnaud de Foïard 2^{e} REP (1965)
- Jeannou Lacaze, 2^{e} REP (1967)
- Bernard Goupil, 2^{e} REP (1972)
- Jean Brette, 2^{e} REP (1974)
- Bernard Janvier, 2^{e} REP (1982)
- Jean Louis Roué, 2^{e} REP (1978)
- Bruno Dary, 2^{e} REP (1994)
- Benoît Puga, 2^{e} REP (1996)
- Hélie de Saint Marc
- Christian Piquemal

== Bibliography ==
- Zaïre : sauver Kolwezi, by Philipe Erulin, Édition Montbel (Photo album)
