= Elrick Irastorza =

French general

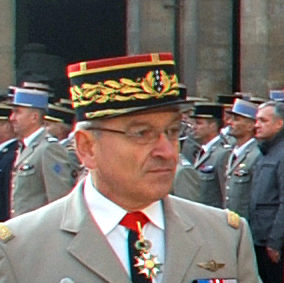
- General Elrick Irastorza, France; 12th Chief of Staff of the French Army
- Born: 29 September 1950 (age 75)
- Allegiance: France
- Branch: French Army
- Service years: 1972 – 2011
- Rank: Army general
- Commands: Chief of the French Army Staff; Lieutenant-Colonel of the 8th Marine Infantry Parachute Regiment
- Conflicts: Operation Tacaud (Chad); Operation UNTAC (Cambodia); Opération Licorne (Ivory Coast)
- Awards: Commander of the National Order of the Legion of Honour; Commander of the National Order of Merit; Cross of Military Valour; Overseas Medal; National Defense Medal Bronze level; Recognition Medal of the Nation; Combatant Cross

General Elrick James Martial Irastorza (born 29 September 1950 in Maillezais) is a French general, formerly Chief of Staff of the French Army. He has served a career in marine paratrooper infantry, notably in oversea operations.

== Biography ==
After studying at military preparatory high schools in Autun and Aix between 1961 and 1970, Irastorza joined the École spéciale militaire de Saint-Cyr in September 1970. He graduated in 1972, obtaining the rank of lieutenant and opting for service in the Troupes de marine.

=== Junior officer ===
From 1973, Irastorza commanded a combat section of the 3rd Marine Infantry Regiment. Later, he joined the paratroopers by transferring to the 2nd Marine Infantry Parachute Regiment, with the same rank. In 1979, he took part in Opération Tacaud, in Chad.

In 1980, promoted to captain, Irastorza was given command of a company of the 8th Marine Infantry Parachute Regiment.

From 1982, he taught at the instruction centre for military preparation in Montpellier, until 1985 when he joined the general staff of the 3rd military region in Rennes as officer for logistics.

=== Senior officer and higher studies ===
Irastorza then completed his studies and oriented himself towards a high-ranking career by attending the École d'application de l'infanterie, obtaining a Master of Advanced Studies in Defence and international relations in 1986 and attending the École supérieure de guerre the next year.

In 1989, he obtained the degree that validates training in command and general staff duties. He then joined the RIMAP as chief of operations.

Promoted to lieutenant-colonel, Irastorza assumed command of the 8e RPIMa in 1991. The next year, he supervised the 1st French battalion of the UNTAC.

From 1993 to 1996, Irastorza was desk officer and second in command at the complement officer of the general staff of the Army, in Paris. He then moved on to serve at the office of military personnel of the Army (DPMAT); from 2000, he was under-director of the DPMAT in charge of recruitment.

=== General officer ===
Irastorza was promoted to brigadier general on 1 October 2000.

In 2002, Irastorza went to supervise the École d'application de l'infanterie. From 2004, he served as aid to the head of the chief of the Force d'action Terrestre.

From 15 June 2005 and June 2006, he commanded the Force Licorne in the Ivory Coast.

Irastorza has served as Chief of Staff of the French Army since 2 July 2008. He retired from the army on the 31 August 2011.

== Decorations and medals ==

- Commander of the Legion of Honour
- Commander of the Order of National Merit
- Cross of military valour
- Croix du Combattant
- Overseas Medal
- Medal of National Defence
- Medal of National gratitude d'Afrique du Nord
- Honorary Member of the Order of Australia (General Division)

== See also ==
- Jean-Pierre Bosser
- Hervé Charpentier

== Sources and references ==
- Biography, French ministry of Defence
