= Bertrand Ract-Madoux =

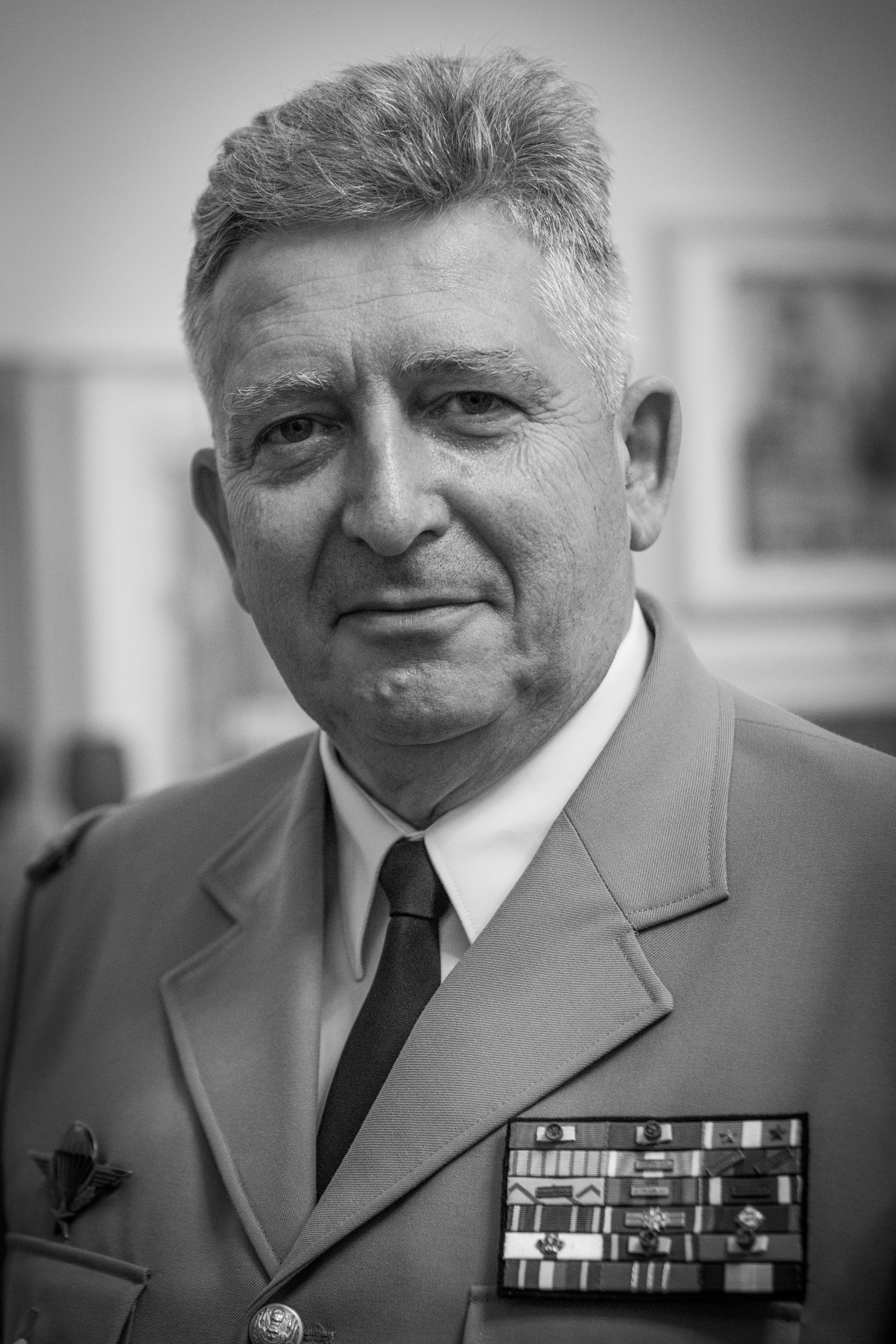
- Bertrand Ract-Madoux in 2014

Chief of Staff of the French Army
- In office 1 September 2011 – 31 August 2014
- Preceded by: Elrick Irastorza
- Succeeded by: Jean-Pierre Bosser

Personal details
- Born: 9 February 1953 (age 73) Saumur, France
- Party: The Republicans
- Education: Prytanée national militaire
- Alma mater: École Spéciale Militaire de Saint-Cyr

Bertrand Ract-Madoux (born 9 February 1953) is a retired general in the French Army and a political candidate. He served in Bosnia and Herzegovina and the Ivory Coast. He was The Republicans candidate for the 1st constituency of Drôme in the 2017 French legislative election.

== Early life ==
Bertrand Ract-Madoux was born on 9 February 1953 in Saumur. His father served in the French Army. He graduated from the École spéciale militaire de Saint-Cyr in 1972.

== Career ==
Ract-Madoux began his military career in the Armoured Cavalry Arm of the French Army. He was appointed as the head of the 1st Spahi Regiment in Valence in July 1995, and he was promoted to the rank of Colonel on 1 October 1995. He commanded a battalion of the NATO-led Implementation Force in Sarajevo, Bosnia and Herzegovina in February–June 1996. He served in the Opération Licorne in the Ivory Coast from October 2004 to February 2004.

Ract-Madoux was promoted to the rank of brigadier general on 1 September 2002, divisional general on 1 June 2005, army corps general on 1 September 2007, and army general on 22 June 2011. He was nominated as Governor of Les Invalides in 2014.

Ract-Madoux is a member of The Republicans. He was their candidate in the 2017 French legislative election to represent the first district of Drôme in the National Assembly.

Ract-Madoux is a grand officer of the Legion of Honour and a commander in the National Order of Merit. He has been listed in Who's Who in France since 2007.
