= North Africa Medal =

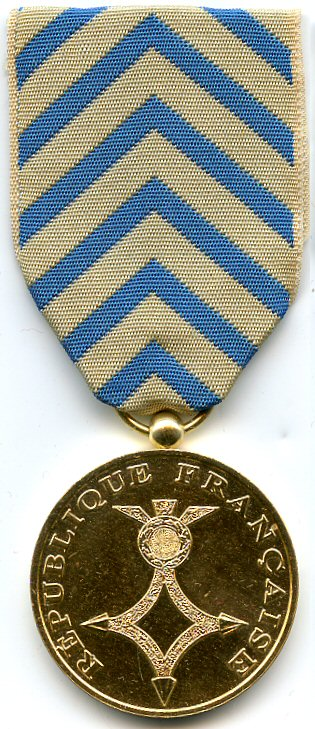
- North Africa medal (obverse)
- Type: Commemorative Medal
- Awarded for: 90 days service in Morocco, Tunisia and Algeria
- Presented by: France
- Eligibility: French citizens and foreign nationals serving in the ranks of the French Foreign Legion
- Status: No longer awarded
- Established: 29 April 1997
- Final award: 12 April 2002
- Ribbon of the North Africa medal

Precedence
- Equivalent: Medal of the Nation's Gratitude
- Next (lower): French commemorative medal

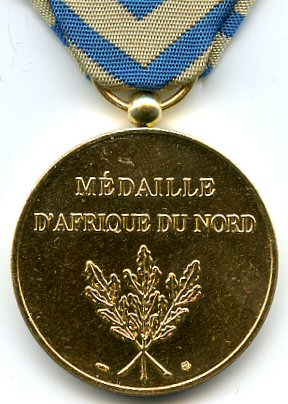
Reverse of the Médaille d'Afrique du Nord

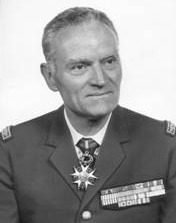
General Pierre Vincent, a recipient of the North Africa medal

The North Africa Medal (French: Médaille d'Afrique du Nord) was a French commemorative medal established on 29 April 1997 by French President Jacques Chirac via decree 97-424, following an initiative of Pierre Pasquini, Minister for veterans' affairs and victims of war who expressed "the importance that an exceptional decoration be established for those who had fought in North Africa". Already in 1996, Minister Pasquini, President Chirac and Prime Minister Alain Juppé had requested that the existing "Title of the Nation's Gratitude" in the form of an official scroll already awarded to soldiers and civilians having served in North Africa between 1952 and 1962, finally be linked to the award of a specific medal.

Not all veterans awarded the "Title of the Nation's Gratitude" met the new medal's award prerequisites and almost immediately, new pressures were placed on the government for new medals or for a single one encompassing all bearers of the Title. It took five years for the new award to be established on 12 April 2002 by decree 2002-511. The "Medal of the Nation's Gratitude" would finally satisfy all involved parties.

The North Africa medal ceased to be awarded that very day following barely five years of existence. It was replaced by the Medal of the Nation's Gratitude with the clasp "AFRIQUE DU NORD" (English: NORTH AFRICA").

== Award statute ==
The North Africa medal was bestowed to French civilians and military personnel, as well as to foreign nationals serving in the ranks of the French Foreign Legion, who held the "Title of the Nation's Gratitude" (French: Titre de la Reconnaissance de la Nation) for at least ninety days service in:

- Algeria between 31 October 31, 1954 and 2 July 1962;
- Morocco between 31 June 1953 and 1 March 1956;
- Tunisia between 1 January 1952 and 19 March 1956.

The ninety-day period of service could be waived for personnel evacuated for treatment of wounds received during these operations. Award of the medal granted the bearer the same rights as the "Title of the Nation's Gratitude", namely the right to a collective pension fund and to have the French flag draping one's coffin upon death.

None can wear this medal that has been condemned to a fixed prison term of one year or more for a crime he committed.

== Award description ==
The North Africa medal was a 34mm in diameter gilded medal struck from bronze. The obverse bore the relief image of an Agadez cross (Southern cross) surrounded by the inscription also in relief "RÉPUBLIQUE FRANÇAISE" (English: "FRENCH REPUBLIC"). The reverse bore the relief inscription on two lines "MÉDAILLE" "D'AFRIQUE DU NORD" (English: "MEDAL" "OF NORTH AFRICA") over the relief image of a sprig of three oak leaves.

The medal hung from a ribbon passing through a ring through the medal's ball shaped suspension loop. The 34mm wide sand coloured silk moiré ribbon bore inverted 34mm wide and 3mm thick blue chevrons. The undress ribbon bore three such chevrons.

== Notable recipients (partial list) ==
- General Pierre Vincent
- General Denis Mercier
- General Benoît Puga
- General Bruno Dary
- General Marcel Valentin
- Captain Hubert Clément
- Sergeant Gilles Mourey

== See also ==
- Scramble for Africa
- French protectorate of Tunisia
- French protectorate in Morocco
- French Algeria
- Algerian War
