= Raymond Chabanne =

French military officer (1924–2022)

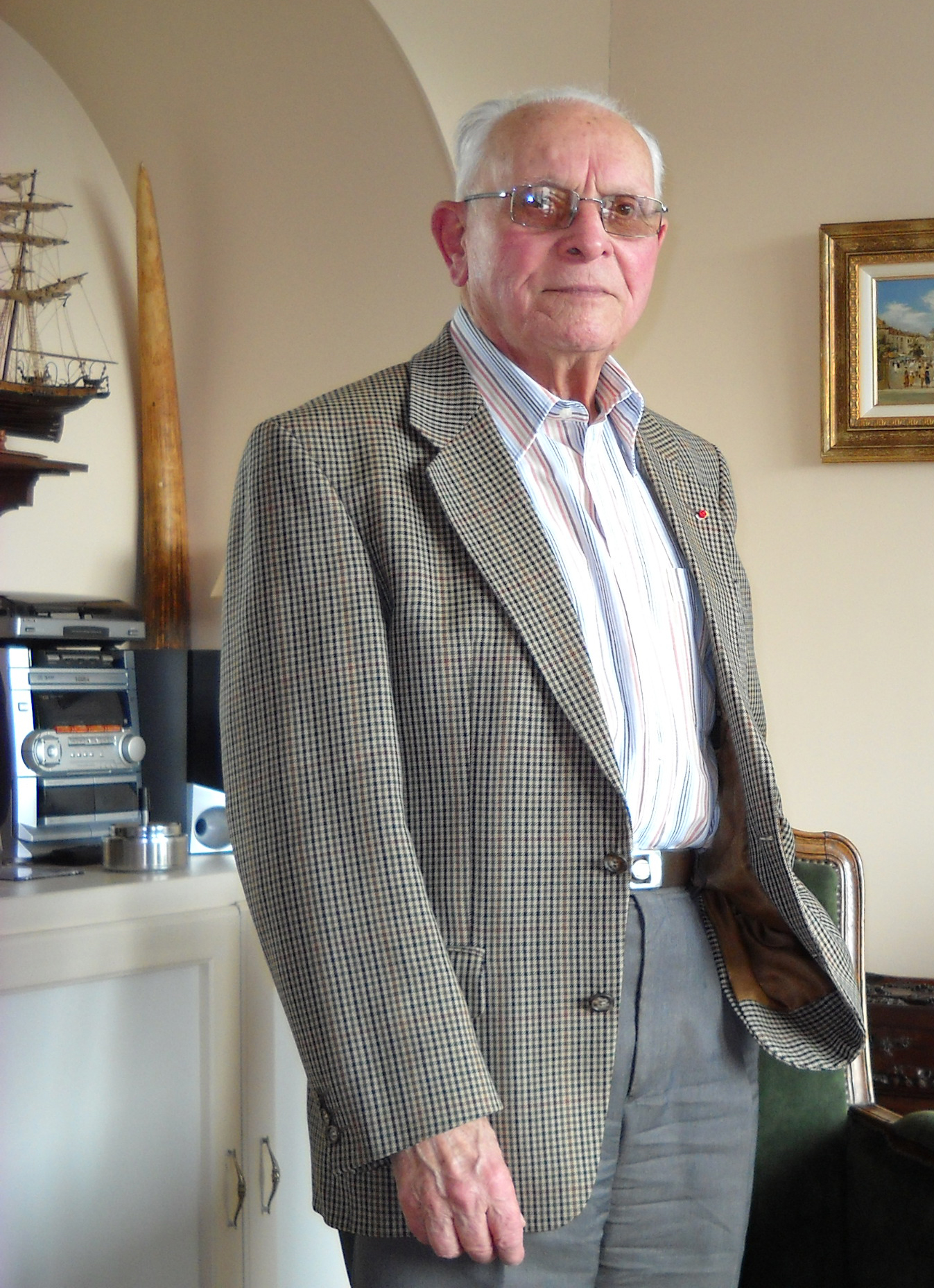
- Chabanne in 2011
- Born: 27 March 1924; Clermont-Ferrand, France
- Died: 3 June 2022 (aged 98); Fontainebleau, France
- Education: École militaire interarmes École de l'infanterie
- Occupation: Military officer

Raymond Chabanne (27 March 1924 – 3 June 2022) was a French military officer who achieved the rank of general. He was commanding officer of the 3rd Marine Infantry Parachute Regiment from 1972 to 1974.

== Biography ==
Chabanne was born in Clermont-Ferrand in 1924. He left home at age 15 and worked as a bellboy and cinema projectionist before joining the Compagnons de France. He left the Compagnons in March 1942 and enlisted in the Free French Forces. Following the invasion of the Zone libre, he was placed on leave and returned to Clermont-Ferrand to work as an intelligence officer for the Office national interprofessionnel des grandes cultures, of which he became departmental director at age 19.

Fully immersed in the French Resistance, Chabanne joined the 4th Regiment of Senegalese Riflemen in Montpellier. After World War II, he graduated from the École militaire interarmes and earned a parachuting certificate from the École de l'infanterie.

Chabanne was appointed second lieutenant in 1948 and was sent to French Indochina aboard the MS Pasteur. After disciplinary problems, he was sent to the 6th colonial infantry regiment in Hanoi. Here, he met Captain Marcel Bigeard at the Hôtel Métropole. He returned to France in 1951 but was sent back to Indochina to oversee the Commandos Nord Viet-Nam. He once again returned to France in 1954 before deployment to Bône in August 1955 to fight in the Algerian War.

Captain Chabanne, assisted by Lieutenant Maurice Schmitt, was sent to instruct at the Centre d'instruction à la pacification et à la contre-guérilla in Philippeville. On 13 May 1958, he was sent to Constantine, where he created the Commando Parachute Group. He was then sent to Aïn Séfra and later Oran, where he was arrested and charged with conspiracy against the French Republic for communications with Algerian freedom fighters.

After three weeks of arrest, Chabanne was sent to Madagascar at the time of the Algiers putsch of 1961. After his return from Madagascar, he was assigned to the 8th Infantry Division in Compiègne, led by General Goujon. In July 1972, he was appointed commanding officer of the 3rd Marine Infantry Parachute Regiment in Carcassonne, despite the fact that he had not attended the École de guerre. After his leadership ended in 1974, he was assigned to the Caserne Lourcines in Paris. In 1975, he was named an advisor to President Omar Bongo. He remained in Gabon for two years before his assignment as Deputy Chief of Staff of the 2nd military region in Lille. He was appointed Général on 28 March 1981.

Raymond Chabanne died in Fontainebleau on 3 June 2022 at the age of 98.

== Decorations ==
- Grand Cross of the Legion of Honour (2017)
