= Medal of the Nation's Gratitude =

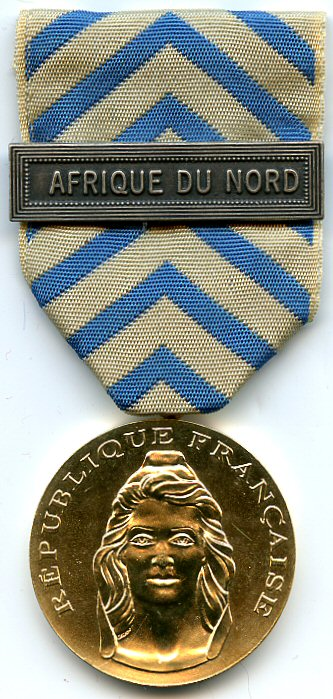
- Medal of the Nation's Gratitude with North Africa clasp
- Type: Civil and Military Award
- Awarded for: Recipients of the Certificate of the Nation's Gratitude
- Presented by: France
- Status: Currently Awarded
- Established: 12 April 2002
- Ribbon of the Medal of the Nation's Gratitude

Precedence
- Equivalent: North Africa medal
- Next (lower): French commemorative medal

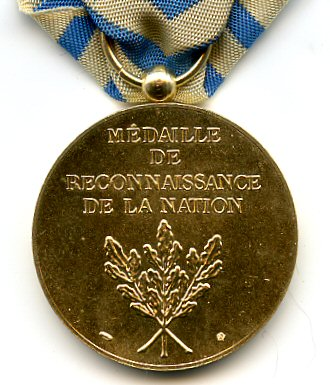
Reverse of the Medal of the Nation's Gratitude

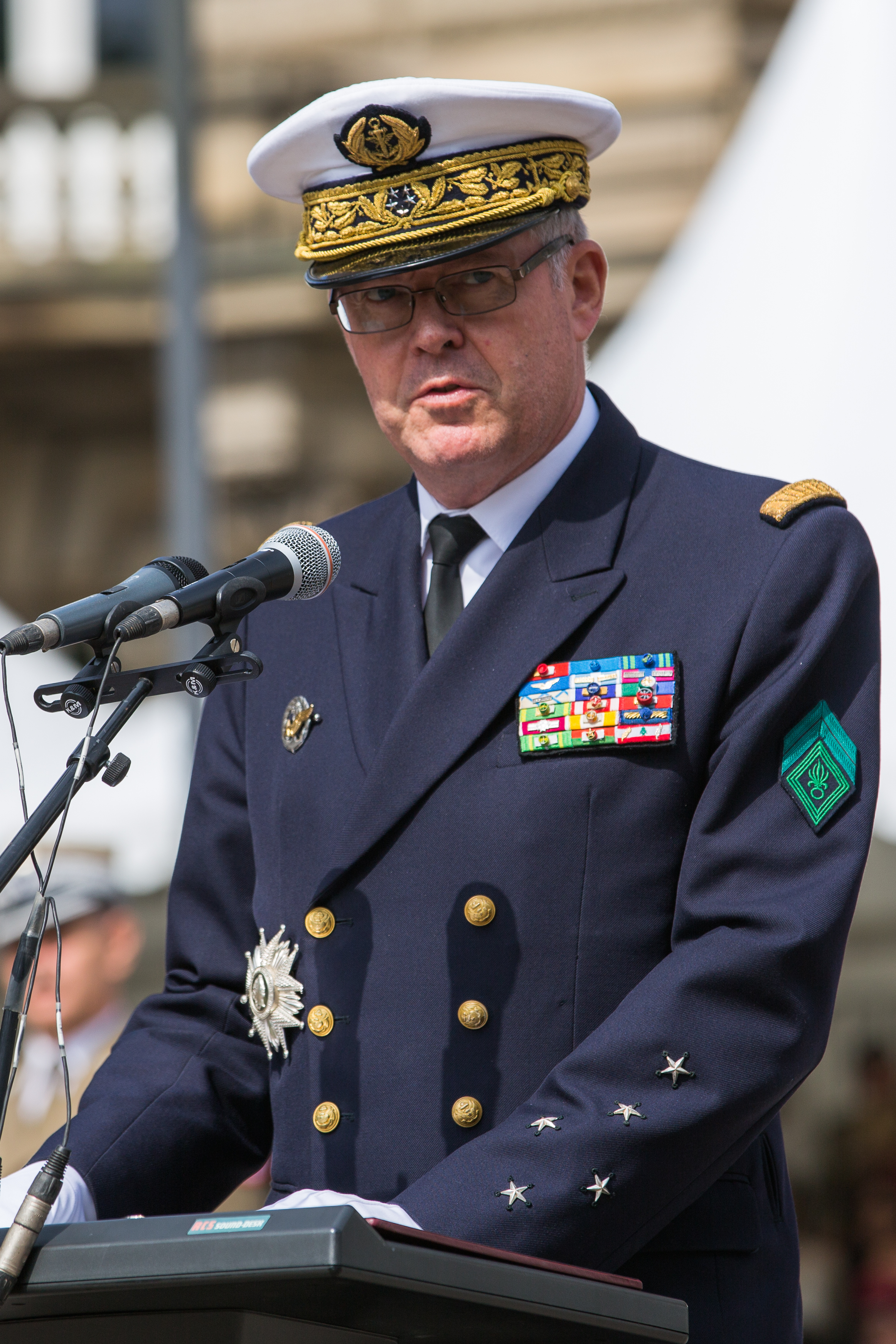
Admiral Édouard Guillaud, a recipient of the Medal of the Nation's Gratitude

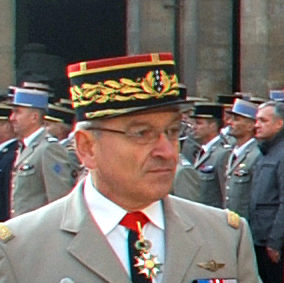
General Elrick Irastorza, a recipient of the Medal of the Nation's Gratitude

The Medal of the Nation's Gratitude (French: "Medaille de Reconnaissance de la Nation") is a French state decoration established on 12 April 2002 by decree 2002-511 and awarded to civilians, veterans of civil or military service, and to members of the French armed forces previously awarded the "Title of the Nation's Gratitude", a governmental scroll certifying to honorable service abroad.

The medal was primarily established to replace the North Africa medal with broader and more inclusive prerequisites following years of pressure on the French government by veterans' organizations.

== Award statute ==
The Medal of the Nation's Gratitude is awarded to persons who have previously been awarded the Title of the Nation's Gratitude, its particular award criteria were fixed by law No. 93-7 of 4 January 1993. Potential recipients must meet the following conditions:

- People who, as members of the military, and for at least 90 days, consecutive or not, served in a formation of the French army or who were detached to a foreign army during the time periods and in the theatres of operation determined by the law;
- Civilians of French nationality who were involved in these conflicts, operations or missions and meeting the prerequisites set by the Minister of Defence.

The Title of the Nation's Gratitude is automatically bestowed to personnel prematurely evacuated due to injuries suffered or diseases caught while in theatre.

The list of theatres of operations determined by the laws of eligibility for the Title of the Nation's Gratitude are:

- First World War;
- Operations between 1918 and 1939;
- Second World War;
- Indochina War;
- The fighting in Tunisia between 1 January 1952 and 2 July 1962;
- The fighting in Morocco between 1 June 1953 and 2 July 1962;
- The Algerian War between 31 October 1954 and 2 July 1962;
- Military operations on the territory of Algeria between 3 July 1962 and 1 July 1964;
- Armed conflicts and operations and missions conducted in accordance with international obligations and commitments of France since 1945. The complete list is contained in the amended order of 12 January 1994.

== Award description ==
The Medal of the Nation's Gratitude is a 34mm in diameter circular medal struck from bronze and gilded. Its obverse bears the effigy of the Republic on surrounded by the relief inscription "RÉPUBLIQUE FRANÇAISE" (English: "FRENCH REPUBLIC"). The reverse bears the relief inscription on four lines "MÉDAILLE" "DE" "RECONNAISSANCE" "DE LA NATION" (English: "MEDAL" "OF" "GRATITUDE" "OF THE NATION") over the relief image of a sprig of three oak leaves.

The medal hangs from a ribbon passing through a ring through the medal's ball shaped suspension loop. The 34mm wide sand coloured silk moiré ribbon bears inverted 34mm wide and 3mm thick blue chevrons. The undress ribbon bears three such chevrons.

The medal is always awarded with a clasp and may be awarded with multiple clasps. Five clasps are currently approved for wear on the ribbon of the Medal of the Nation's Gratitude:

- 1914–1918
- 1939–1945
- INDOCHINE (English: INDOCHINA)
- AFRIQUE DU NORD (English: NORTH AFRICA)
- OPERATIONS EXTERIEURES (English: FOREIGN OPERATIONS)

== Notable recipients (partial list) ==
- General Denis Mercier
- General Marcel Valentin
- General Bruno Dary
- Admiral Édouard Guillaud
- General Philippe Houbron
- General Elrick Irastorza
- General Bertrand Ract-Madoux
- Sergeant Gilles Mourey
- French Resistance heroine Andrée Peel
- French Resistance member Léopold Rabinovitch
- World War 2 intelligence operative Marthe Cohn

== See also ==
- World War I
- World War II
- Indochina War
- Algeria War
- French Armed Forces
