= Bruno Dary =

French general (born 1952)

Bruno Dary

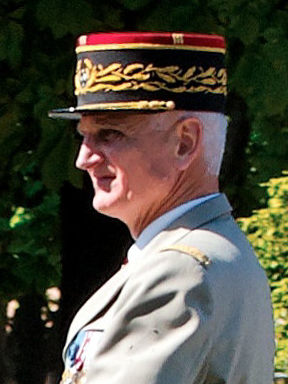
- Bruno Dary in 2008
- Born: 21 December 1952 (age 73); Barcelonnette, France
- Military career
- Allegiance: France
- Branch: French Army
- Service years: 1972–2012
- Rank: Général d'armée
- Units: 2nd Foreign Regiment; 2nd Foreign Parachute Regiment; 5th Mixed Pacific Regiment; 4th Foreign Regiment; 11th Parachute Division; 13th Demi-Brigade of the Foreign Legion
- Commands: 2nd Foreign Parachute Regiment; 6th Light Armoured Brigade; Commandement de la Légion Étrangère; Military governor of Paris
- Conflicts: Battle of Kolwezi; Ivory Coast Conflict 2002-2007; Ivory Coast Conflict 2010-2011

Bruno Dary (born 21 December 1952 in Barcelonnette, Alpes-de-Haute-Provence) is a former Général d'armée of the French Army and commandant of the Foreign Legion. He was the 136th Military governor of Paris (French: Gouverneur militaire de Paris) from 1 August 2007 until 2012, and is the current president of the Committee of the Flame under the Arc de Triomphe de l'Étoile, the association in charge of maintaining the eternal flame of the Tomb of the Unknown Soldier.

== Military career ==
Bruno Dary studied at the Prytanée national militaire and was admitted to the École spéciale militaire de Saint-Cyr in 1972. He then graduated part of the promotion of the « Général de Linares ». At the end of his studies, he chose to serve in the infantry.

Designated a sous-lieutenant in 1973, he opted at the completion of the Infantry Application School to serve in the Foreign legion, where he served first in the 2^{e} R.E. at Corte between 1975 and 1976, as a combat section (platoon) chief (French: chef de section). Promoted to lieutenant in 1975, he then served in the 2ème REP at Calvi from 1976 to 1979 as a combat section chief. During this period, he took part in the airborne operation of the Battle of Kolwezi in May 1978.

Promoted to captain in 1979, he joined the 5th Mixed Pacific Regiment, 5^{e} RMP at Moruroa, where he served as a detachment commander and security officer. Assigned in 1980 to the 4^{e} RE of Castelnaudary, he commanded the regiment's instructor cadre between 1982 and 1984, whose mission is to form all cadres and Non-Commissioned Officers (NCO) of the Foreign Legion.

Dary was assigned to the headquarters of the 11th Parachute Division 11^{e} DP at Toulouse in 1984, and named chef de battalion the same year. He was in charge of all forms and phases of airborne training. At the same time, he pursued a Diploma of Depth Studies (French: Diplôme d'Etudes Approfondies, DEA) of Political Sciences and was admitted in 1988 to the École supérieure de guerre in Paris as a candidate (French: stagiaire) of the 102nd class.

Dary subsequently held the posts of chief of operations and instruction bureau at the 13^{e} DBLE at Djibouti, which he would finished service in 1992 as a lieutenant-colonel. During that tenure, he participated in several operations in the Horn of Africa.

Assigned as the regimental commander of the 2ème REP between 1994 and 1996, he was tasked with commanding the French operational assistance element in the Central African Republic from December 1994 to May 1995 and the IFOR 2nd Infantry Battalion in the former Yugoslavia from November 1995 to April 1996, with almost the entire of the regiment.

He was an instructor at the All-Arms Defense College (French: Collège Interarmées de Défense) of Paris in 1996 during 4 months, then responsible officer of theAfrica cell at the center of the interarm operations of the general staff headquarters for almost 3 years. He was then assigned as the auditor of the Center of the Superior Studies of the National Defense and the Institute of Superior Studies of National Defense (French: Institut des Hautes études de Défense Nationale) in 1999. He then served as section chief doctrine at the general staff headquarter of the Armies (French: État-Major des Armées, EMA).

Promoted to Général de brigade in 2002, Dary assumed command of the 6th Light Armoured Brigade 6^{e} BLB with headquarters stationed at Nîmes. He was subsequently engaged for 4 months as the brigade's commander in the Ivory Coast.

In August 2004, Dary, now a Général de division, assumed command of the Foreign Legion, a post which he held until 2006. In 2006, the 75th Anniversary of the Commandement de la Légion Étrangère was celebrated during his tenure. In September 2006, he was appointed as a function inspector at the corps of Inspection of the French Army.

Promoted to Général de corps d'armée, Dary was designated as Military governor of Paris, Commandant of the Ile-de-France region and General Officer Commanding of the Defense and Security Zone of Paris starting 1 August 2007. On 16 October 2007, he was appointed as a founding member of the Administration Council of the Armed Forces Museum of France. He was promoted to Général d'armée on 1 June 2012, and retired from active duty on 31 July 2012.

In December 2012, in the capacity of a 2nd section officer general, he assumed the Presidency of the Committee of the Flame under the Arc de Triomphe, the association which is in charge of organising the lighting of the eternal flame of the Tomb of the Unknown Soldier. On 30 August 2013, mainly accompanied by French paratroopers, he presided over the military funeral of Commandant Helie de Saint Marc at Place Saint-Jean.

== Recognitions and honors ==
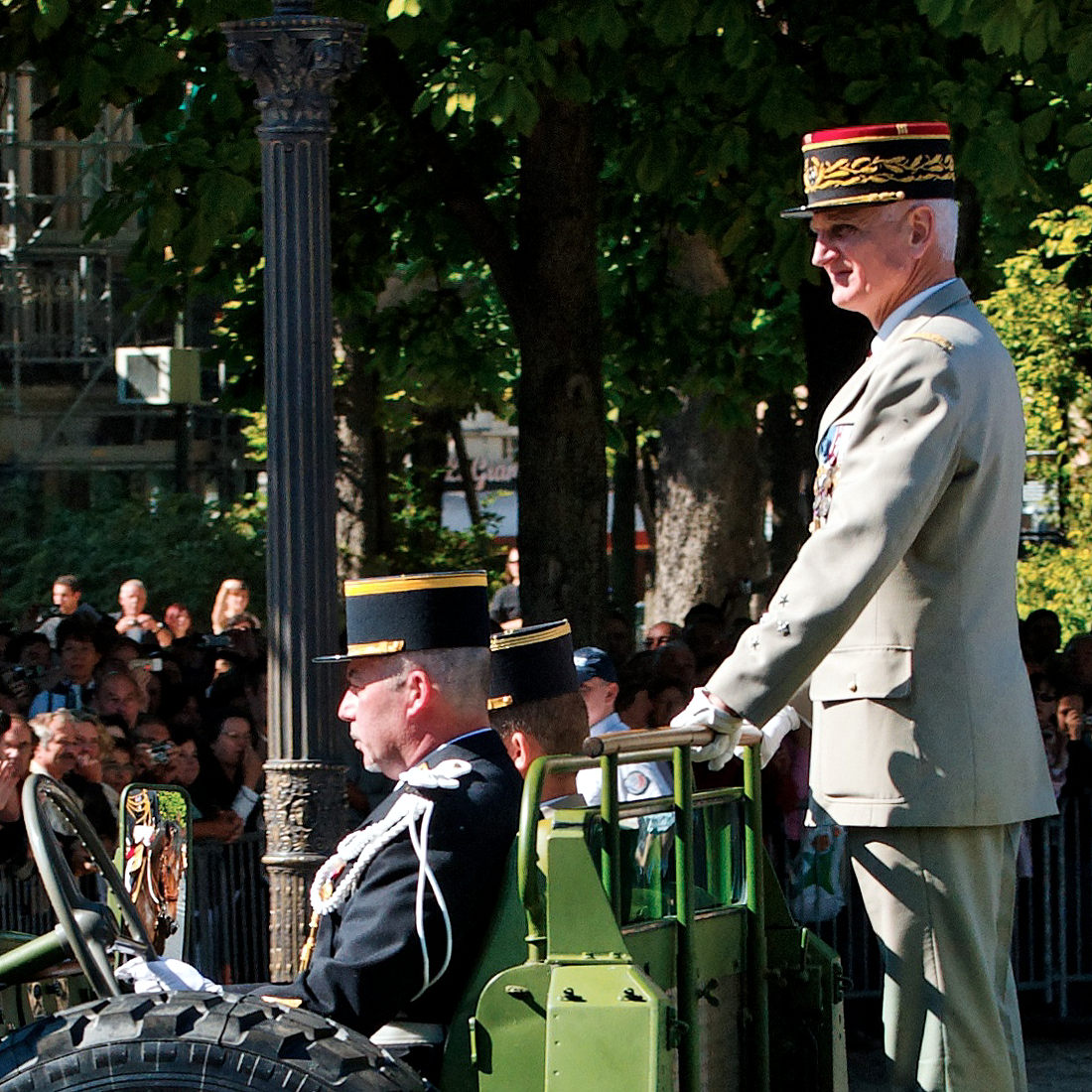
général Bruno Dary, Military governor of Paris (2007-2012), in revue passage.

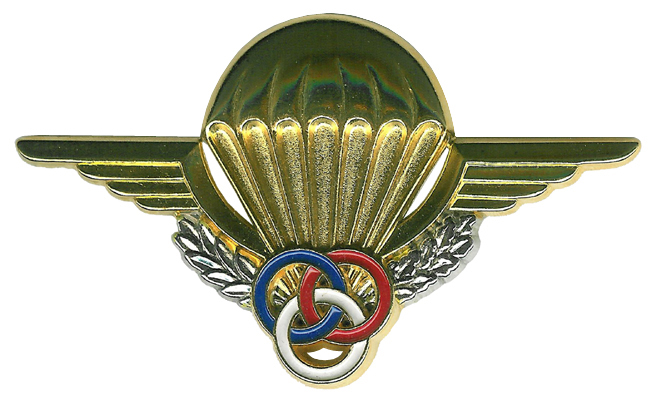

- Badge d'Instructeur de Parachutisme
- Commandeur de la Légion d'honneur
- Grand officier de l'ordre national du Mérite
- Croix de la Valeur militaire (3 citations)
- Croix du combattant
- Médaille d'Outre-Mer
- Médaille de la Défense nationale (médaille d'argent)
- Medaille de Reconnaissance de la Nation (d'Afrique du Nord)
- Médaille commémorative française
- Cross of Military Bravery of Zaire with bronze palm (1978)
- UNPROFOR Medal
- NATO Medal (former Yugoslavia)
- MINURCA Medal
- Polish Army Medal in bronze
- Order of Merit, Commander (Côte d'Ivoire)
- Unidentified

== See also ==
- French Foreign Legion Music Band (MLE)
- Pierre Segretain
- Pierre Jeanpierre
- Jacques Lefort, regimental commander of the 2nd Foreign Parachute Regiment, 2^{e} REP, (1958)
- Pierre Darmuzai, 2^{e} REP (1960)
- Paul Arnaud de Foïard, 2^{e} REP (1965)
- Jeannou Lacaze, 2^{e} REP (1967)
- Helie de Saint Marc
- Roger Faulques
- Bernard Goupil, 2^{e} REP (1972)
- Jean-Claude Coullon
- Jean Brette, 2^{e} REP (1974)
- Philippe Erulin, 2^{e} REP (1976)
- Jean Louis Roué, 2^{e} REP (1978)
- Bernard Janvier, 2^{e} REP (1982)
- Christian Piquemal
- Benoît Puga, 2^{e} REP (1996)
- Éric Bellot des Minières, 2^{e} REP (2008)
- Hervé Charpentier

Military offices
Preceded by Xavier de Zuchowicz	Military governor of Paris; 2007–2012	Succeeded by Hervé Charpentier
