= North Africa Security and Order Operations Commemorative Medal =

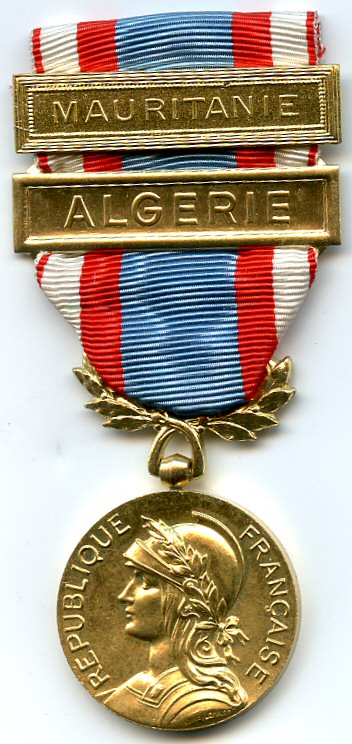
- North Africa Security and Order Operations Commemorative Medal with clasps "ALGÉRIE" and "MAURITANIE"
- Type: Commemorative Medal
- Awarded for: Military service in North Africa between 1952 and 1964
- Presented by: France
- Eligibility: French citizens and foreign nationals serving in the ranks of the French Foreign Legion
- Status: No longer awarded
- Established: 11 January 1958
- Ribbon of the North Africa Security and Order Operations Commemorative Medal

Precedence
- Next (higher): Indochina Campaign commemorative medal
- Next (lower): Middle East operations commemorative medal

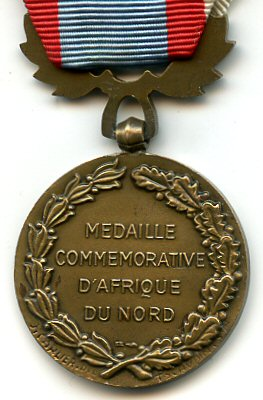
Reverse of the pre January 1958 variant

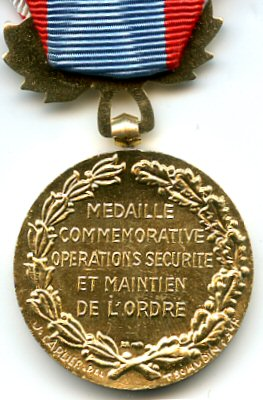
Reverse of the post January 1958 variant

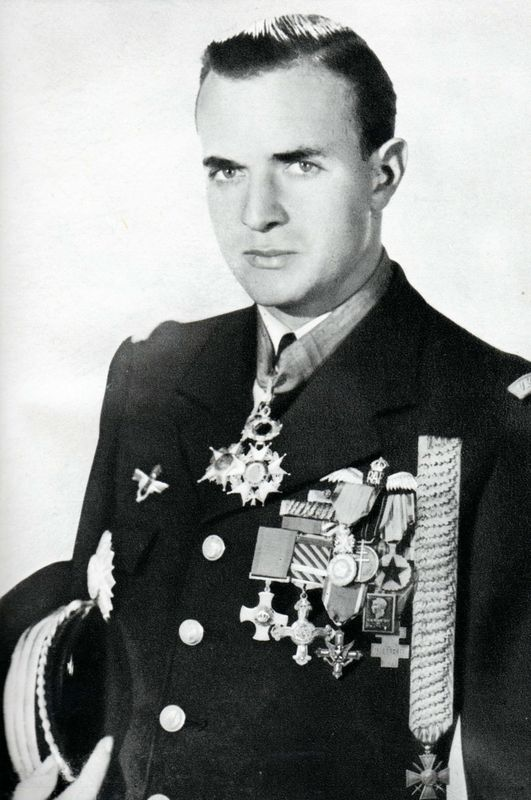
Fighter ace Pierre Clostermann, a recipient of the Commemorative Medal for Security Operations and Maintenance of Order

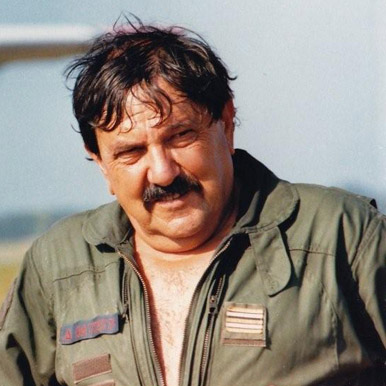
Colonel Antoine Battesti, a recipient of the Commemorative Medal for Security Operations and Maintenance of Order

The Commemorative Medal for Security Operations and the Maintenance of Order (French: "Médaille Commémorative des Opérations de Sécurité et de Maintien de l'Ordre en Afrique du Nord") is a French commemorative medal established in the late 1950s for award to members of the French armed forces and French civil servants under military authority for service in French North Africa during the hectic years that would become the end of French colonialism in the region.

== Award history ==
The war in Algeria was and remains a sensitive subject for France, the events were only first openly officially identified as a war in 1999. The Médaille Coloniale ("Colonial Medal") or Médaille d'Outre-Mer ("Overseas Medal") were for service overseas and the Croix de Guerre ("War Cross") was for service in wartime against an exterior enemy. There was no award at the time to recognize and reward combat service on what was essentially French soil. A medal was initially created by decree 56-1032 of 12 October 1956 and called the Médaille Commémorative des Opérations de Sécurité et de Maintien de l'Ordre en Afrique du Nord (English: "Commemorative Medal for Security Operations and Maintenance of Order in North Africa"). It was designed to fill this void and recognize their service in what was officially called a "police action" to quell disorder, rather than a military campaign against an armed and organized enemy. Decree 58-24 of 11 January 1958 modified the design and renamed the award to "Médaille Commémorative des Opérations de Sécurité et de Maintien de l'Ordre" (English: "Security and Order Operations Commemorative Medal").

Under pressure for years by veterans' organizations and from the personnel who served during the handovers in Tunisia and Morocco to get commemorative medals of their own, the French government finally ceded by a decree dated 26 July 2004 with an amendment to the 1958 decree governing the award. Rather than design a new medal for each operation in North Africa, the government decided to extend the eligibility, the existing medal could then be awarded to anyone who had served in North Africa during the 1950s and 1960s.

== Award statute ==
The North Africa Security and Order Operations Commemorative Medal was awarded to:

- members of the French armed forces for 90 days or more service in security and order operations in regular or reserve formations. The time factor is waived for those cited with the Cross for Military Valour or wounded as a result of these operations;
- governmental civil servants and of police services as well as those personnel placed under the authority of the military authority, or that participated in the operations proper as a result of their responsibilities or specialty, that met the aforementioned military prerequisites;
- sailors of the French navy placed under the orders of the IV region's naval prefect for missions of at least 90 days in a 24-month period (added by a decree of 17 October 1960).

Five different gilt clasps could be earned and worn simultaneously when awarded.

- ALGÉRIE (English: Algeria) for 90 days service between 31 October 1954 and 1 July 1964
- TUNISIE (English: Tunisia) for 90 days service between 1 January 1952 and 2 July 1962
- MAROC (English: Morocco) for 90 days service between 1 June 1953 and 2 July 1962
- SAHARA (English: Sahara) for 90 days service between 31 October 1954 and 27 June 1961
- MAURITANIE (English: Mauritania) for 90 days service between 10 January 1957 and 1 January 1960

== Award description ==
North Africa Security and Order Operations Commemorative Medal is a 30mm in diameter circular medal struck from bronze and gilded. The obverse, engraved by Georges Lemaire, bore an allegorical image of the warrior French Republic wearing a helmet adorned with and oak leaf wreath and surrounded by the relief inscription along the medal circumference "RÉPUBLIQUE FRANÇAISE" (English: "FRENCH REPUBLIC"). On the reverse, the relief inscription on five lines "MÉDAILLE" "COMMÉMORATIVE" "OPÉRATIONS SÉCURITÉ" "ET MAINTIEN" "DE L'ORDRE" (English: "MEDAL" "COMMEMORATIVE" "SECURITY OPERATIONS" "AND MAINTAINING" "ORDER") surrounded by a wreath of oak and olive leaves along the medal circumference. The pre January 1958 variant had the reverse inscription on four lines "MÉDAILLE" "COMMÉMORATIVE" "D'AFRIQUE" "DU NORD" (English: "NORTH" "AFRICA" "COMMEMORATIVE" "MEDAL").

The medal hung from a ribbon passing through a wreath shaped ring through the medal's suspension loop. The red silk moiré ribbon was 36mm wide with a 14mm central light blue stripe and two 5mm wide white stripes each 1mm from the edge.

== Noteworthy recipients (partial list) ==
- General Raoul Salan
- General Pierre Langlois
- General Paul Lardry
- General Maurice Henry
- General Jean Simon
- General Maurice Schmitt
- General Henri Amiel
- General Paul Arnault
- General Renaud de Corta
- General Gérard Lecointe
- General Bernard Janvier
- General Marcel Bigeard
- General Michel de Courrèges
- Colonel Fred Moore
- Colonel Antoine Battesti
- Colonel Roger Faulques
- Colonel André Salvat
- Lieutenant colonel Pierre Clostermann
- Lieutenant colonel Léo Vidou
- Lieutenant colonel Albert Fossey-François
- Lieutenant colonel Marius Guyot
- Major Bernard Cabiro
- Captain Hubert Clément
- Chief warrant officer Jo Sohet
- Master sergeant Marc Flament
- François d'Orléans son of Henri d'Orléans

== See also ==
- Algerian War
- French Algeria
- French protectorate of Tunisia
- Scramble for Africa
