= Middle East Operations Commemorative Medal (1956) =

Middle East operations commemorative medal (1956)
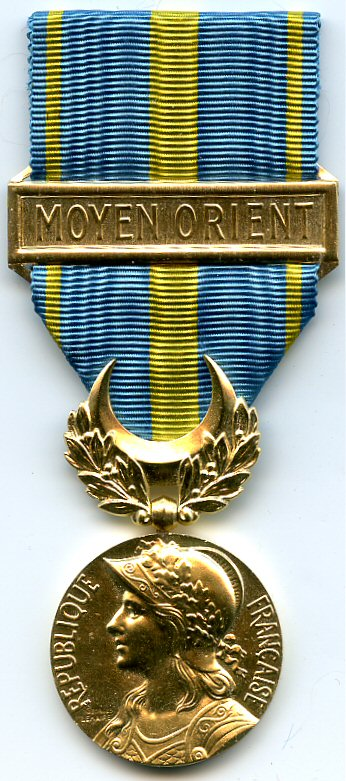
- Middle East operations commemorative medal (1956) (obverse)
- Type: Campaign medal
- Awarded for: Service in the Middle East between 1 September and 22 December 1956
- Presented by: France
- Eligibility: French citizens
- Status: No longer awarded
- Established: 22 May 1957
- Ribbon of the Middle East operations commemorative medal (1956)

Precedence
- Next (higher): North Africa Security and Order Operations Commemorative Medal
- Next (lower): French commemorative medal

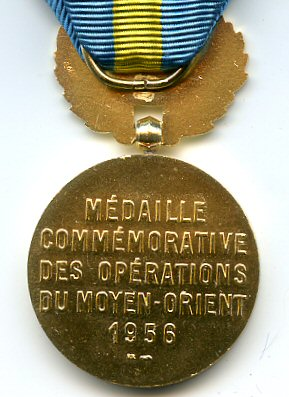
Reverse of the medal

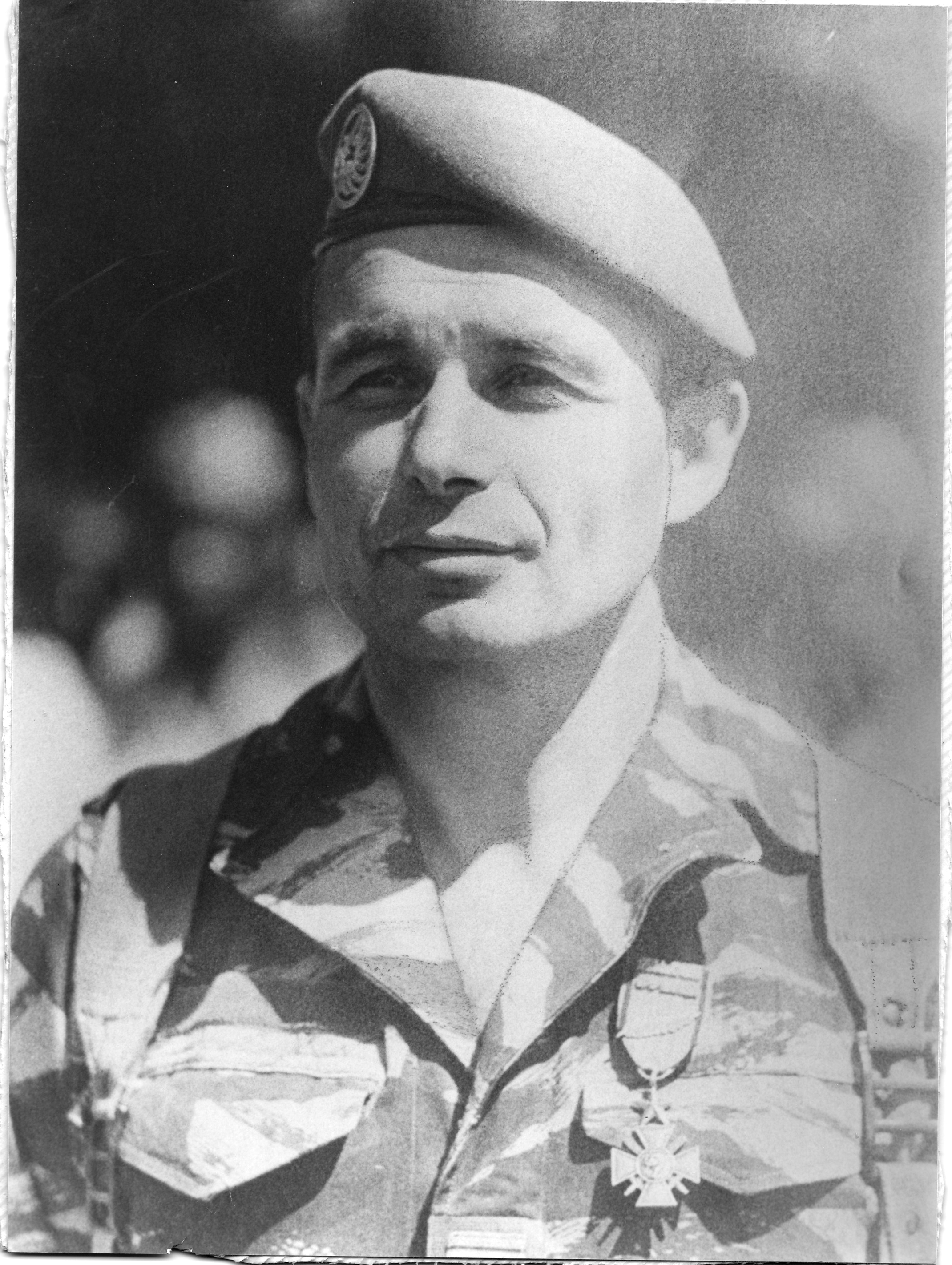
Colonel Philippe Erulin, a recipient of the Middle East operations commemorative medal

The Middle East operations commemorative medal (French: Médaille commémorative des opérations du Moyen-Orient) was a French commemorative medal established on 22 May 1957 to recognize the participation of French nationals in the military operations conducted during the Suez Crisis of 1956.

== Historical background ==
In 1956, Egyptian President Nasser decided to nationalize the Suez Canal Company, this action was against French and British interests in the region leading to a military intervention by both countries. For its part, France decided to send a 10,000 man strong expeditionary force under the command of Admiral Pierre Barjot and General André Beaufre.

Under heavy diplomatic pressure from both the United States and the USSR, the Franco-British forces withdrew from the retaken territories and the entire expedition was abandoned after barely four months. The French forces had suffered fifteen dead.

== Award statute ==
The Middle East operations commemorative medal was awarded to French soldiers from all three services and civilians (including the crews of merchant vessels and civilian airliners) for participation in the operations that took place in the geographical area lying between the 20th and 36th Northern parallels and the 24th and 40th Eastern meridians between 1 September and 22 December 1956.

The medal is not issued with a certificate and the right to wear it is justified by the possession of a military document confirming participation in the operations. No one can claim the right to wear this medal if condemned to a prison term or severe punishment for reprehensible actions carried out during the operation. Applications for the award are made at the office of the French Ministry of Defence.

== Award description ==
The Middle East operations commemorative medal is a 30mm in diameter circular medal struck from bronze, it may be gilt. The obverse bears the relief image of the "warrior republic" in the form of the left profile of a helmeted woman's bust, the helmet being adorned by a crown of oak leaves. On either side, the relief inscription along the circumference "RÉPUBLIQUE FRANÇAISE" (English: "FRENCH REPUBLIC").

On the reverse, the relief inscription on five lines "MÉDAILLE COMMÉMORATIVE DES OPÉRATIONS DU MOYEN-ORIENT 1956" (English: "MIDDLE EAST OPERATIONS COMMEMORATIVE MEDAL 1956").

The medal hangs from a ribbon through a ring passing through the medal's suspension loop. The ring is adorned by a 24mm in diameter bronze laurel wreath and half crescent. The silk moiré ribbon is 37mm wide and is light blue with a yellow central 7mm wide and 2mm wide stripes 2mm from the edges.

A gilt clasp bearing the relief inscription "MOYEN-ORIENT" (English: "MIDDLE EAST") is worn on the ribbon.

== Notable recipients (partial list) ==
- Admiral Pierre Barjot
- Admiral Jacques Lanxade
- General André Beaufre
- General Jean Simon
- Colonel Philippe Erulin
- Major Hélie de Saint Marc
