= René Andrieu =

French Resistance fighter (1920–1998)

René Andrieu (Beauregard, 1920 - 1998) was a French Communist Resistance fighter, journalist and politician. He served in the Francs-Tireurs et Partisans during World War II, and headed the Communist newspaper l'Humanité from 1958 to 1984. He was also part of the Central Committee of the French Communist Party.

== Biography ==
René Andrieu's father was a farmer in Beauregard, Lot, while his mother ran a restaurant in the town , which was open once a month on the day of the village's monthly fair. He is an altar boy at the village church, and his 90-year-old great-grandfather is the Churchwarden there.

As a scholarship student, he entered the Lycée Gambetta in Cahors as an intern in 1931. After obtaining his high school diploma in 1938, he continued his studies at a preparatory class in Toulouse to prepare for the competitive entrance exam to the École normale supérieure (Paris). He attended the lectures of Georges Canguilhem, whom he greatly admired. He had to give up taking the exam in 1939, after France declared war on Germany and student grants were abolished. He then became a boarding school supervisor at a secondary school in Figeac, while studying for a bachelor's degree in literature at the University of Toulouse. He received his mobilization order in the spring of 1940 but was quickly sent home without having fought, due to France's surrender. He continued his studies in literature during the German military administration in occupied France during World War II.

== Works ==
- Les communistes et la révolution, Julliard, 1968
- Du bonheur et rien d'autre, Robert Laffont, 1975
- Choses dites, Editions Sociales, 1979
- Stendhal ou le bal masqué, J. C. Lattès, 1983
- Un rêve fou ? Un journaliste dans le siècle, L’Archipel, 1996
