= École de l'infanterie =

- Active: 1946 – Present
- Country: France
- Branch: French Army
- Type: Training
- Role: Infantry Training
- Garrison/HQ: Draguignan

The École de l'infanterie (English: "Infantry School"), formerly known as École d'application de l'infanterie, is a French military academy that trains commissioned officers, non-commissioned officers, and some enlisted personnel having special aptitudes and roles. It is located in Draguignan.

The École de l'infanterie offers over 70 different courses (either generalist, specialist or adaptation) to around 1500 trainees yearly. Five hundred additional trainees from foreign armies or from French ministries other than that of Defence, attend annual courses there.,

== History ==
The École d'application de l'infanterie was created on 30 January 1946 in Auvours, as a post-graduate course for young officers freshly graduated from Saint-Cyr.

On 15 October 1948, the school was moved to Coëtquidan, next to Saint-Cyr itself. In October 1951, it was moved again to Saint-Maixent-l'École, and opened to non-commissioned officer promoting to officer, to élèves-officiers de réserve, and to non-commissioned officers in active service.

On 15 January 1955, a new unit was created specifically to train serving army captains and majors, as well as promotable reserve officers.

On 1 August 1967, the school was moved again to Montpellier, and integrated with the École militaire d'infanterie (Infantry military school). In 1969, it also absorbed the Centre de perfectionnement des cadres de l'infanterie (Infantry leaders finalization centre), and later the Centre d'instruction spécialisé du tir et du combat de nuit (Night fire and combat instruction specialised Centre).

The 2008 reforms of the French Defence forces moved the school to Draguignan in 2010.

== Missions ==
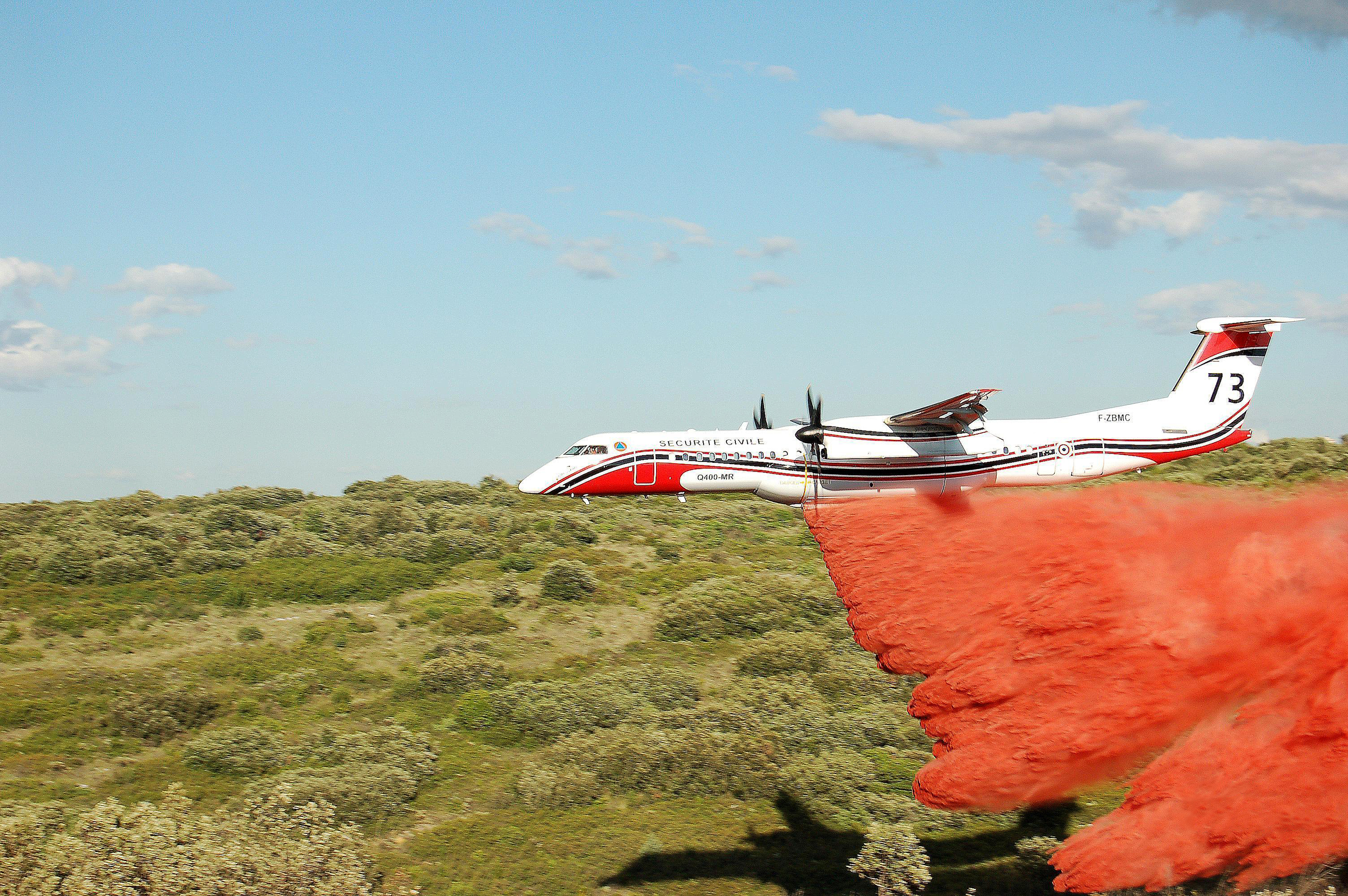
Firefighting training support to the Camp des Garrigues near Nimes

The school has the following missions:

- Training active and reserve leaders of the Infantry, including troupes de marine, motorised and mechanised infantry, paratroopers, chasseurs alpins and the Légion étrangère. Officers and NCOs undergo an initial training at the beginning of their career and further their formation all through their career, when their promote, gain a specialisation, or qualify for new equipment.
- Study and prospection for future infantry, both in tactics and in equipment.
- Support to Camp des Garrigues and military units of Montpellier
- Operational missions in case of crisis within the region of Montpellier

== Sources and references ==
- Cherchell
- Presentation of the École de l'Infanterie at the Ministry of Defence
