= National Defence Medal =

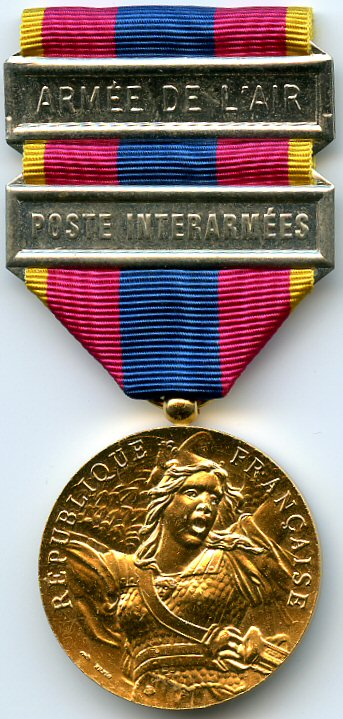
- National Defence Medal, Gold grade (obverse)
- Type: Medal with three classes (Gold, Silver and Bronze)
- Awarded for: Particularly honorable service rendered to the French military Valor not involving combat with the enemy
- Presented by: France
- Eligibility: French citizens and foreign nationals
- Status: Currently awarded
- Established: 21 April 1982

Precedence
- Next (higher): Overseas Medal
- Next (lower): Medal for voluntary military service

The National Defence Medal (French: "Médaille de la Défense nationale") is a French military decoration. It was created by Charles Hernu, Minister of Defence and established by decree on 21 April 1982. It rewards particularly honourable service rendered by military personnel for their participation in operational activities. The medal has three levels: Gold, Silver and Bronze.

== Eligibility ==
=== For military service ===
The award is made by decision of the military hierarchy, but the recipients must have achieved a personal minimum of:

- For the Bronze level: 1 year of service and accumulated 90 points;
- For the Silver level: 5 years of service (minimum 2 years in the Bronze level) and accumulated 600 points;
- For the Gold level: 10 years of service (minimum 2 years in the Silver grade) and accumulated 800 points

The yearly quota of Gold and Silver level awards are set by the minister of defence. Points are earned through participation in exercises, operations, proficiency, initiative, awards received, etc. People who had been awarded the Légion d'honneur or the Ordre national du Mérite can not receive the National Defence Medal.

=== Exceptional circumstances ===
The medal can be awarded in any one of the three levels to:

- Military personnel on active duty or in reserves and civilians killed or injured in the line of duty;
- Active military or reservists which have distinguished themselves by the quality of their service;
- French civilians and foreign military personnel or civilians who have rendered honourable services particularly important to the defence of France

=== Mention in Dispatches ===
When an individual is mentioned in dispatches (citation dans les ordres) for heroism not involving actual conflict with an enemy. He or she is awarded the Médaille de la Défense Nationale at the Gold level, adorned with a ribbon device (bronze, silver, silver gilt star or bronze palm) depending on the level (regiment, brigade, division, army) of the mention, in the same manner as for the Croix de Guerre.

== Award description ==
=== Medal and ribbon ===
The National Defence Medal is a 36 mm in diameter circular medal struck from bronze, the gold level is gilt, the silver award is silvered. The obverse bears the relief image of Rude's Marseillaise with the relief inscription along the upper circumference "FRENCH REPUBLIC" (French: RÉPUBLIQUE FRANÇAISE). The reverse bears the relief image of a Phrygian cap over a laurel branch and the inscription along the medal circumference in the upper half "ARMY" and "NATION", in the lower half "NATIONAL DEFENSE" (French: "ARMÉE" "NATION" "DÉFENSE NATIONALE"), the upper and lower inscriptions being separated by a relief five pointed star on each side

The medal hangs from a ring through the medal's suspension loop. The bronze grade award's ribbon is a 36 mm wide red silk moiré ribbon with a 12 mm wide central blue stripe. The ribbon for the silver grade award is similar with the addition of 3 mm wide white edge stripes, the edge stripes are yellow for the gold grade award

Gold grade obverse & ribbon	Silver grade obverse & ribbon	Bronze grade obverse & ribbon	Gold grade for mentions in dispatches obverse & ribbon	Gold grade reverse & ribbon
With clasps: AIR FORCE and INTERSERVICES POST	With clasps: FRENCH NAVY and SUBMARINES	With clasp: AIRBORNE TROOPS	With palm for an Army level citation	Common reverse for all grades

=== Clasps ===
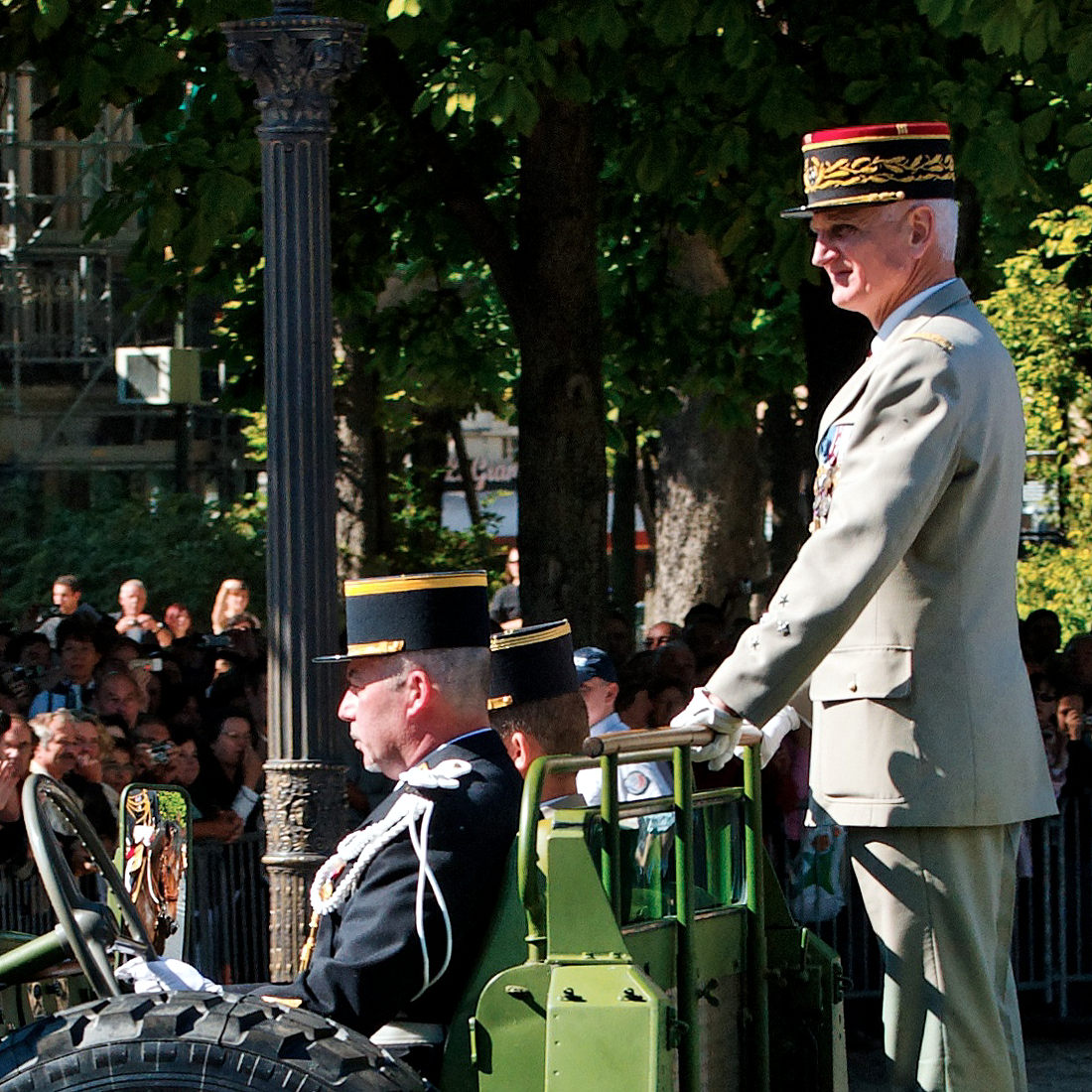
General Bruno Dary, a recipient of the Silver grade of the National Defense Medal

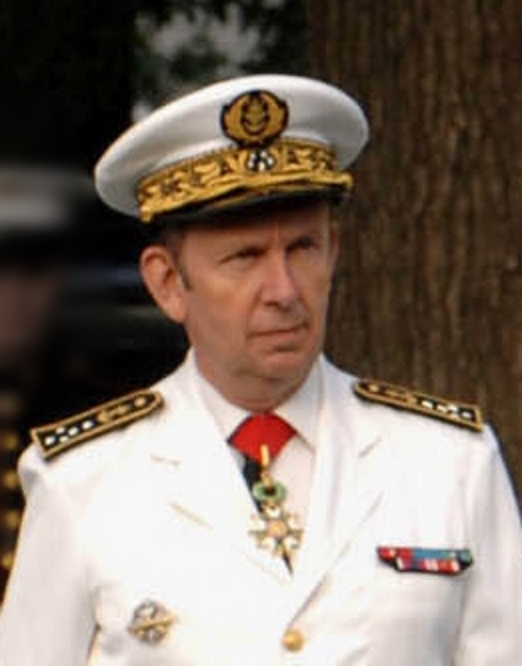
Admiral Pierre-François Forissier, a recipient of the Silver grade of the National Defense Medal

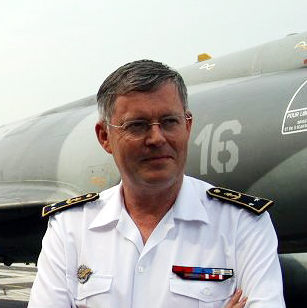
Admiral Édouard Guillaud, a recipient of the Bronze grade of the National Defense Medal

Multiple specialty and geographical clasps are allowed for wear on the ribbon, each grade being allowed a single clasp up to a maximum of three. As of 29 January 2021 the following clasps are awarded:

Geographical clasps

- Corps européen (European Corps)
- Force océanique stratégique (Strategic Oceanic Force)
- Missions d'opérations extérieures (Foreign operational missions)
- Missions d'opérations intérieures (Domestic operational missions)
- Mururoa-Hao (Moruroa-Hao)
- Terres australes et antarctiques (Southern and Antarctic lands)
- Essais Nucléaires (Nuclear Testing)

Speciality clasps

- Armée de l'air (Air Force)
- Défense aérienne (Air defense)
- Soutien des forces aériennes (Air Force support command)
- Forces aériennes (Air Forces Command)
- Forces aériennes stratégiques (Strategic Air Forces Command)
- Génie de l'air (Air Force engineers)
- Espace (French Space Command)
- Service d'infrastructure de la défense (Defence Infrastructure Service)
- Interarmées (Joint forces)
- Service du commissariat des armées (Armed Forces Commissariat Service)
- Journée défense et citoyenneté (Defence and Citizenship Day)
- Armée de terre (Army)
- Arme blindée et cavalerie (Armoured Cavalry)
- Artillerie (Artillery)
- Aviation légère (Light Aviation)
- Génie (Military engineers)
- Infanterie (Infantry)
- Légion étrangère (Foreign Legion)
- Troupes de marine (Marine troops)
- Matériel (Matériel)
- Sapeurs-pompiers (Paris Fire Brigade)
- Sécurité civile (Civil Defence)
- Transmissions (Signal Corps)
- Train (Logistics and transportation)
- Troupes aéroportées (Airborne troops)
- Troupes de montagne (Mountain troops)
- Armement (Weapons)
- Industrie de défense (Defence Industry)
- Défense
- État-major (General staff)
- Gendarmerie nationale (National Gendarmerie)
- Écoles de gendarmerie (Gendarmerie schools)
- Formations aériennes de la gendarmerie (National Gendarmerie air units)
- Garde républicaine (Republican Guard)
- Gendarmerie de la sécurité des armements nucléaires (Nuclear Weapons Security Gendarmerie)
- Gendarmerie de l'air (Air Gendarmerie)
- Gendarmerie de l'armement (Armement Gendarmerie)
- Gendarmerie départementale (Departmental Gendarmerie)
- Gendarmerie des transports aériens (Air Transport Gendarmerie)
- Gendarmerie d'outre-mer (Overseas Gendarmerie)
- Gendarmerie maritime (Maritime Gendarmerie)
- Gendarmerie mobile (Mobile Gendarmerie)
- Justice militaire (Military justice)
- Marine nationale (Navy)
- Aéronautique navale (Naval Aviation)
- Bâtiments de combat (Warships)
- Fusiliers marins (Naval Infantry)
- Marins pompiers (Marseille Naval Fire Battalion)
- Nageurs de combat (Combat swimmer)
- Plongeurs démineurs (Clearance diver)
- Sous-marins (Submarines)
- Poste interarmées (Military postal service)
- Service de santé (Defence Health Service)
- Service des essences (Military Fuel Service)
- Cyber (Cyber Defence Command)
- Musique

Obsolete clasps

- Forces françaises stationnées en Allemagne
- Missions d'assistance extérieure
- Commissariat armée de terre
- Force Aérienne Tactique
- Fusiliers Commandos de l'Air
- Transport Aérien
- Intendance
- Commandement air des systèmes de surveillance, d'information et de communications
- Commandement des Écoles de l'Armée de l'Air
- Force Aérienne de Combat
- Force Aérienne de Projection
- Forces de protection et de sécurité de l'armée de l'air

== Notable recipients (partial list) ==
=== Gold grade ===
- Paris firefighter master corporal Christophe Dubois
- Athlete Cyril Soyer
- General Denis Mercier
- BG Azharul Islam, Bangladesh Army, received on 25 November 2025.

=== Silver grade ===
- General Bruno Dary
- Admiral Pierre-François Forissier
- Général de corps d'armée Bruno Clément-Bollée
- General Francis Pollet
- Admiral Bernard Rogel

=== Bronze grade ===
- Admiral Édouard Guilaud
- General Benoît Puga
- General Xavier Bout de Marnhac
- Prince Jean, Duke of Vendome
- Prince Charles Philippe, Duke of Anjou
- Jean, Count of Paris
- Police colonel Isabelle Guion de Méritens
- Police major Bruno Beschizza
- Naval reserve lieutenant commander Jean-Jacques Brot
- Police brigadier general Thierry Orosco
- General Antoine Lecerf
- Gendarmerie nationale général d'armée Denis Favier
- Sailor Bruno Sevaistre
- Canadian Army Colonel George Petrolekas MSM,CD (Bronze Grade with Interarmee clasp)
- US Army Lieutenant Colonel William Hogan (Bronze Grade with Armee de Terre clasp
- US Army Captain Scott Curtis (Bronze Grade with Armee De Terre clasp
- US Army Captain Benjamin Frederick (Bronze Grade with Armee De Terre clasp
- US Army Sergeant Kyle Hall (Bronze Grade with Armee De Terre clasp
- USMC Captain Justin Hillebrand (Bronze Grade with Armee De Terre clasp)
- Cyprus Air Force Sergeant Kyritsis Evangelos (with Armee De L'Air clasp)
- Dr Frank Blazich, Smithsonian Institution (Bronze Grade with Armee De Terre and Légion étrangère clasps)
- British Army Cpl (now SSgt) Chris Graham (with Armee De Terre clasp)

=== Exceptional circumstances ===
- USA Major General Charles Hooper (Gold grade with clasp "INFANTERIE")
- USA Lieutenant Colonel Jeff Ritsick (Gold grade with clasp "INFANTERIE")

=== Mentions in dispatches ===
- USAF Captain John Mosier (Gold grade with bronze star)
- USAF Technical Sergeant Kristopher Burridge (Gold grade with bronze star)
- USAF Senior Airman Jackson Rogers (Gold grade with bronze star)

== See also ==
- Ribbons of the French military and civil awards

== Sources ==
- http://www.france-phaleristique.com/accueil.htm
- https://web.archive.org/web/20110710193646/http://www.entente-combattants-herault.com/decorations.html
- https://bd.ambafrance.org/France-Honours-Bangladeshi-Army-Officer-with-Prestigious-Defence-Medal
