= Opération Licorne =

Military operation in Côte d'Ivoire

- Part of First Ivorian Civil War
- Date: 22 September 2002 – 21 January 2015
- Executed by: French Army

Opération Licorne was a French Armed Forces peacekeeping operation in support of the United Nations Operation in Côte d'Ivoire. The French forces had been stationed in the country since shortly after the outbreak of the Ivorian Civil War. The troops' main mission was to support the United Nations peacekeeping mission and to ensure the security of French and foreign nationals.

Licorne was replaced on 21 January 2015 by the French forces in Ivory Coast.

== Mission ==
The "Force Licorne", which allegedly takes its name from the establishment in Libreville, Gabon, from which the first contingents departed in September 2002, is commanded by a General Officer (COMANFOR, Force Commander), assisted by an associate Operations General.

The Force Licorne comprises battalion task groups (Groupements Tactiques Interarmes), which comprise infantry, cavalry, transport and logistics, health service, joint civil-military action groups, etc. As of 6 February 2007, there were three GTIAs: GTIA 1 in the west, GTIA 2 in the centre, and the 43rd GTIA formed around the 43rd BIMa of the Troupes de Marine in Abidjan. The Force also comprises a battalion of the French Army Light Aviation (BATALAT), a logistics battalion (BATLOG), squadrons of the Mobile Gendarmerie (militarised riot police), squadrons of the Gendarmerie prévôtale (military police), and a troop transport group from the French Air Force.

Since March 2008, the structure has changed, with the logistic battalion and the GTIA43 dissolved and the logistics and support functions provided together by the BSVIA, a joint services support base stationed at Port-Bouët.

The Force Licorne and the ONUCI are known in Côte d'Ivoire as "Impartial Forces".

The cost of the operation is estimated at around 200 million Euros per annum.

== History ==
This military operation started in September 2002 (at the start of the Ivorian Civil War), independently of the United Nations, to honor the defense agreements signed in between France and Côte d'Ivoire on 24 August 1961. France, and later the Economic Community of West African States (ECOWAS), sent large military contingents to separate the two sides. The military operation included more than 4000 men (down to 2400 in August 2007). The French authorities, who were supported by a UN resolution, alleged that this intervention avoided a civil war and widespread massacres.

An agreement among all the involved political forces was signed in France at Marcoussis, on 24 January 2003.

On 4 April 2004, the ONUCI took over from the contingents of the ECOWAS, while the Force Licorne (then 4600 men), which remained under French command, stayed in place to support the United Nations force UNOCI.

=== Ivorian-French violence ===
On 6 November 2004, the Ivorian governmental air force carried out an attack on the French position in Bouaké, causing nine deaths and 37 wounded in the French Military (2nd Marine Infantry Regiment (2 RIMa), the Régiment d'infanterie-chars de marine (RICM, a light armoured regiment), 505th transport and logistics regiment). The French forces counterattacked, destroying the two Ivorian Sukhoi Su-25s at the Yamoussoukro base fifteen minutes after the attack.

French President Jacques Chirac gave the order to destroy the entire Ivorian Air Force to prevent any further attacks by the National Army (FANCI) against the New Forces (Forces Nouvelles, FN) rebels, which would be contrary to the Marcoussis Agreements, and to forbid any further attacks against the French positions. The Ivorian air force has since been rebuilt.

In November of 2004, the French Army opened fire on Ivorian rioters, putting the Force Licorne in a delicate situation vis-à-vis the civilian population. The suspicious death of an Ivorian in May 2005 caused the suspension, then the formal reprimand and transfer of the Division General Henri Poncet and of his Associate Operations General Renaud de Malaussène, as well as the suspension of Colonel Eric Burgaud, head of the 13th battalion of Chasseurs Alpins and a non-Commissioned Officer from this same battalion by the then Minister of Defense Michèle Alliot-Marie.

A WikiLeaks cable regarding Operation Licorne states: "the French are quite bitter about Cote d'Ivoire, once a crown jewel of France-Afrique, which spiraled into chaos after the death of one of France-Afrique's biggest advocates and beneficiaries, Houphouet-Boigny, reaching a nadir with the November 2004 bombing by Cote d'Ivoire of French forces in Bouake. Operation Licorne in Cote d'Ivoire, perhaps France's last unilateral military intervention in the old style, has cost France about €250 million per year, or well over a billion euro in total, without yielding decisive results."

=== Second civil war ===
In March 2011, the ongoing crisis in Côte d'Ivoire escalated into a full-scale military conflict between forces loyal to Laurent Gbagbo, the President of Côte d'Ivoire since 2000, and supporters of the internationally recognized president-elect Alassane Ouattara.

Heavy fighting broke out on 31 March 2011 as forces of Alassane Ouattara advanced on Abidjan from several directions. The United Nations peacekeepers took control of Abidjan's airport when Gbagbo's forces abandoned it, and United Nations forces were also reported to be carrying out protective security operations in the city. The UN peacekeeping mission said its headquarters were fired on by Gbabgo's special forces on 31 March and returned fire in an exchange lasting about three hours. UN convoys have also come under attack by Gbagbo loyalists four times since 31 March, with three peacekeepers injured in one of the attacks. The peacekeepers had exchanged fire with Gbagbo loyalists in several parts of the city.

By 2 April, 1,400 French and other foreign nationals (900 of whom were Lebanese citizens) entered the French peacekeepers’ camp in Abidjan Airport. The Lebanese president, U.N. officials, and French commanders provided assistance to facilitate the departure of the Lebanese, French, and African nationals who wished to leave Côte d'Ivoire.

On 4 April 2011, UN and French helicopters also began firing on pro-Gbagbo military installations; a French military spokesman said the attacks were aimed at heavy artillery and armoured vehicles. Eyewitnesses reported seeing two UN Mi-24P attack helicopters firing missiles at the Akouédo military camp in Abidjan. UN helicopters were flown by Ukrainian Ground Forces crews seconded to the United Nations. The attacks sparked protests by a Gbagbo spokesperson, who said that such actions were "illegal, illegitimate and unacceptable." UN Secretary-General Ban Ki-moon defended the actions, however, saying that "the [UN] mission has taken this action in self-defence and to protect civilians." He noted that Gbagbo’s forces had fired on United Nations patrols and attacked the organization’s headquarters in Abidjan “with heavy-caliber sniper fire as well as mortars and rocket-propelled grenades,” wounding four peacekeepers. Russian Foreign Minister Sergei Lavrov said that Russia intends to look into the legitimacy of the use of force by UN peacekeepers. The position of the Russian government was that any foreign interference would only lead to increasing violence.

On 9 April, pro-Gbagbo forces were reported to have fired on the Golf Hotel, where Ouattara was located. The attackers reportedly used both sniper rifles and mortars; in response, UN peacekeepers fired on them. The following day, United Nations and French forces carried out further air strikes against Gbagbo's remaining heavy weapons, using Mi-24 and Aérospatiale Gazelle attack helicopters. The attack was reported to have caused heavy damage to the presidential palace.

On 11 April, Ouattara's forces stormed Gbagbo's residence and arrested him. The final assault was assisted by French forces using helicopters and armoured vehicles, although the actual capture was made by Ouattara's troops. Gbagbo, his wife, sons and about 50 members of his entourage were captured unharmed and were taken to the Golf Hotel, Ouattara's headquarters, where they were placed under United Nations guard.

== See also ==
- United Nations Operation in Côte d'Ivoire
- 2004 French–Ivorian clashes

== Sources ==
- L'opération Licorne vue par la Légion étrangère
- Codestria : Les dessous de l'opération Licorne
