= French commemorative medal =

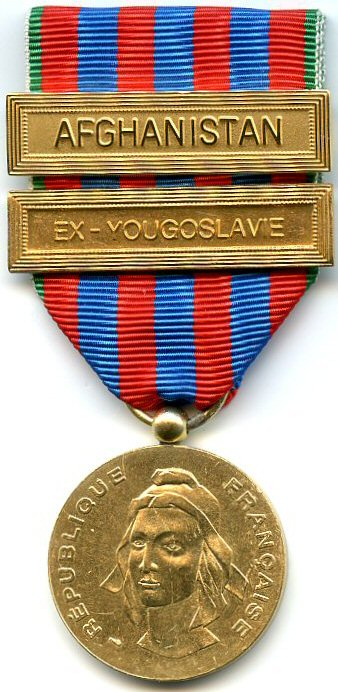
- French commemorative medal (obverse)
- Awarded for: Specific missions outside of French national territory after 1 March 1991.
- Presented by: France
- Eligibility: French citizens and foreign nationals
- Status: Currently awarded
- Established: 9 October 1995
- Ribbon for the French commemorative medal

Precedence
- Next (higher): Middle East operations commemorative medal
- Next (lower): Medal for the War Wounded

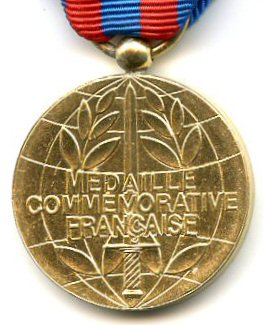
Reverse of the French commemorative medal

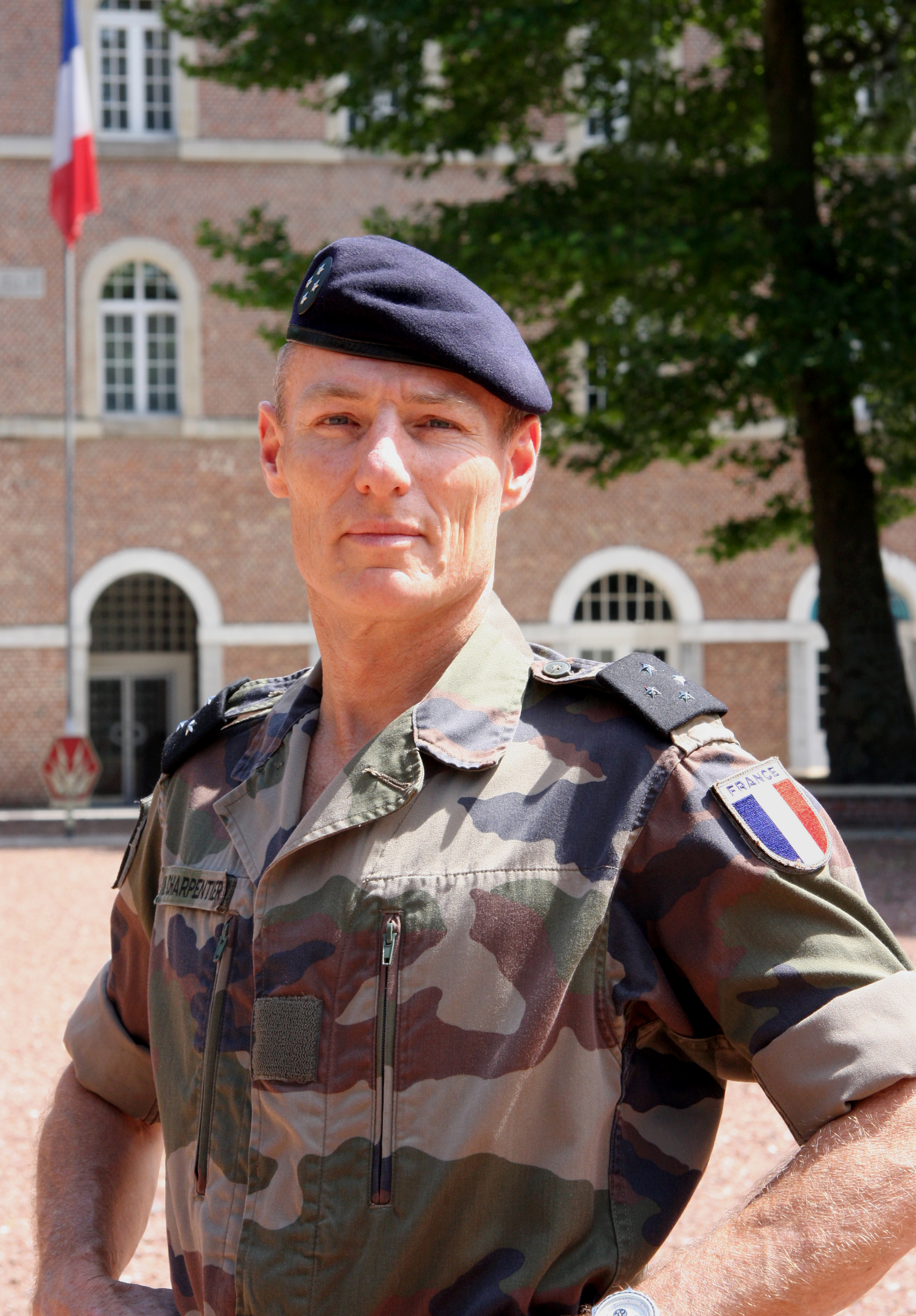
General Hervé Charpentier, a recipient of the French commemorative medal

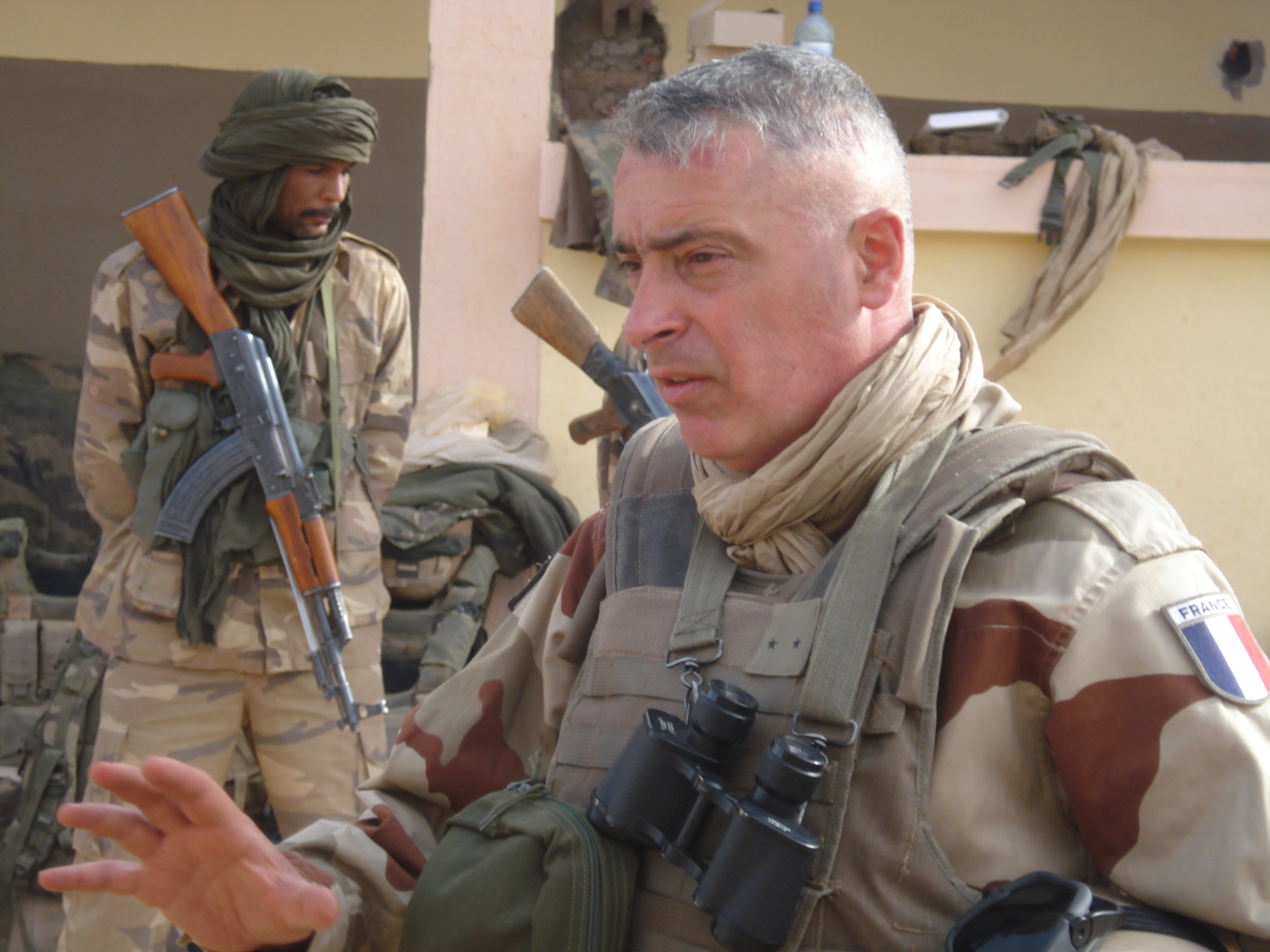
General Bernard Barrera, a recipient of the French commemorative medal

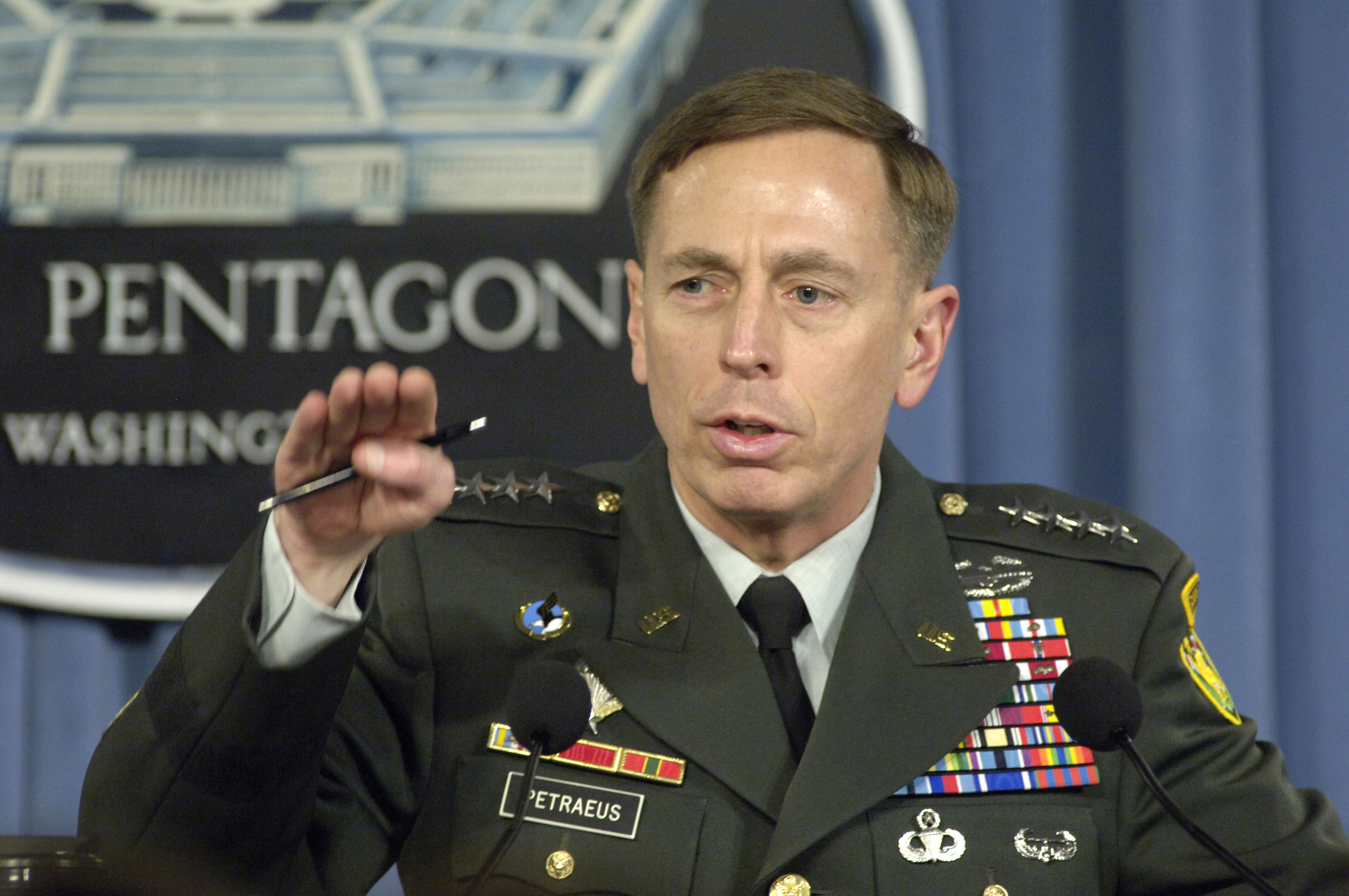
U.S. Army Gen. David H. Petraeus shown wearing French commemorative medal ribbon (bottom-right)

The French commemorative medal (French: "Médaille commémorative française") is a French decoration intended to recognize civilians and soldiers who took part in specific missions ordered by the French government carried out outside of French national territory after 1 March 1991. It was established by decree 95-1098 on 9 October 1995 on the initiative of the then Defence Minister, François Léotard.

== Award statute ==
The French commemorative medal is awarded to civilian and military personnel who participated in a dedicated mission ordered by the government and carried out outside of French national territory after 1 March 1991. The Minister of Defence decides by individual decree each theatre of operations in which the medal may be earned, the start and end dates for award eligibility, and the minimal time in theatre required to earn the award. The minimum time required in theatre may be waived for personnel that are killed, wounded, cited with the War Cross for foreign operational theaters or Cross for Military Valour, or repatriated early for medical reasons.

Civilian personnel eligible are those placed at the disposal of the military authority or actively taking part in the mission in view of their function or specific job. In this case, the minister responsible for them proposes bestowal of the award to the Defence Minister for final approval.

The medal may be awarded to foreign military and civilians having served under French command, subject to approval by their own governments.

Any mission eligible for award of the Overseas Medal cannot be eligible for this award.

The medal is always worn with at least one clasp. Each operational mission clasp can only be earned once.

== Award description ==
The French commemorative medal is a 30mm in diameter circular gilded medal struck from bronze. The obverse bears the effigy of the republic three quarters facing and wearing a Phrygian cap surrounded by the relief inscription along the medal circumference "RÉPUBLIQUE FRANÇAISE" (English: "FRENCH REPUBLIC"). The reverse is arranged akin a stylized globe, at the center, the relief image of a vertical sword pointing up within an olive wreath, the inscription "MÉDAILLE COMMÉMORATIVE FRANÇAISE" (English: "FRENCH COMMEMORATIVE MEDAL") superimposed over it in relief.

The medal hangs from a ribbon through a ring passing through the medal's ball shaped suspension loop. The 38mm wide silk moiré ribbon is divided into four red and three blue alternating 5mm wide stripes and is edged with 1,5mm green stripes.

To date, ten operational mission clasps have been approved for wear on the ribbon:

- EX-YOUGOSLAVIE (English: Former-Yugoslavia) 1991
- HAÏTI (English: Haiti) 1993, 2004, 2010
- ALBANIE (English: Albania) 1997 - 2001
- TIMOR-ORIENTAL (English: East-Timor) 1999 - 2000
- AFGHANISTAN (English: Afghanistan) 2001
- ASIE DU SUD-EST (English: Southeast Asia) 2004
- GÉORGIE (English: Georgia) 2008
- LIBYE (English: Libya) 2011
- JORDANIE (English: Jordan) 2012
- GUINÉE (English: Guinea) 2015
- ORMUZ (English: Strait of Hormuz) 2021

== Notable recipients (partial list) ==
- General Bernard Barrera
- General Pierre de Villiers
- General Jean-Paul Paloméros
- General Jean-Philippe Margueron
- General Antoine Lecerf
- General Hervé Charpentier
- General David Petraeus, USA
- CPO Henry Pacete, USN

== See also ==
- French forces in Afghanistan
- Russia–Georgia war
- Albanian Rebellion of 1997
- United Nations Transitional Administration in East Timor
- 2010 Haiti earthquake
