= Overseas Medal =

Overseas Medal Médaille d’Outre-Mer
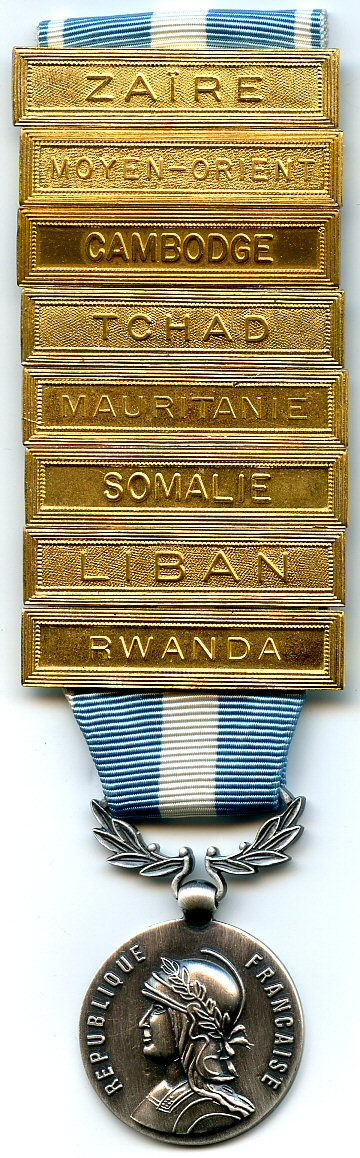
- Overseas and revers of the medal with a number of clasps
- Type: Commemorative Medal
- Awarded for: Participating in operations outside national territory
- Presented by: France
- Status: Currently awarded
- Established: 6 June 1962
- Ribbon bar of the medal

Precedence
- Next (higher): Medal of French Gratitude
- Next (lower): Médaille de la Défense nationale
- Related: Colonial Medal

The Overseas Medal (French: Médaille d'Outre-Mer) is a commemorative or campaign medal issued to members of the French Armed Forces and other nations in assistance to French troops for participating in operations outside national territory. It replaced the French Colonial Medal by decree on 6 June 1962.

== Description ==
- Ribbon: sky blue with three vertical white bands, the two side ones of 2mm and the central one of 7mm
- Medal: the work of engraver Georges Lemaire, in silver. A helmeted allegorical effigy of a woman as the personification of the French Republic, circled by the words "République française". The reverse shows a terrestrial globe on top of trophies of military conquest with the words "MEDAILLE D'OUTRE-MER"
- Link: Silver laurel branches.
- Bars: Gilt, showing the territory where the campaign occurred.

== Campaign Clasp ==
The areas of service are indicated by a gilt silver campaign clasp, there are currently 13 available:

- Cambodge (Cambodia)
- Liban (Lebanon)
- Tchad (Chad), awarded to all French personnel, military or otherwise, who served in Chad regardless of the length of service from March 15, 1960 to January 27, 2008 . As of January 28, 2008, the campaign clasp is awarded for fifteen days of consecutive service or a cumulative equivalent of non-consecutive days.
- Mauritanie (Mauritania), awarded to all French personnel, military or otherwise, who served in Mauritania from November 1977 to July 1990, regardless of length of service.
- Moyen-Orient (Middle East)
- Ormuz (Hormuz)
- République centrafricaine (Central African Republic)
- République de Côte d'Ivoire (Republic of Côte d'Ivoire)
- République démocratique du Congo (Democratic Republic of Congo)
- République du Congo (Congo)
- Rwanda (Rwanda)
- Somalie (Somalia)
- Zaïre (Zaire)
- Sahel (Mali)
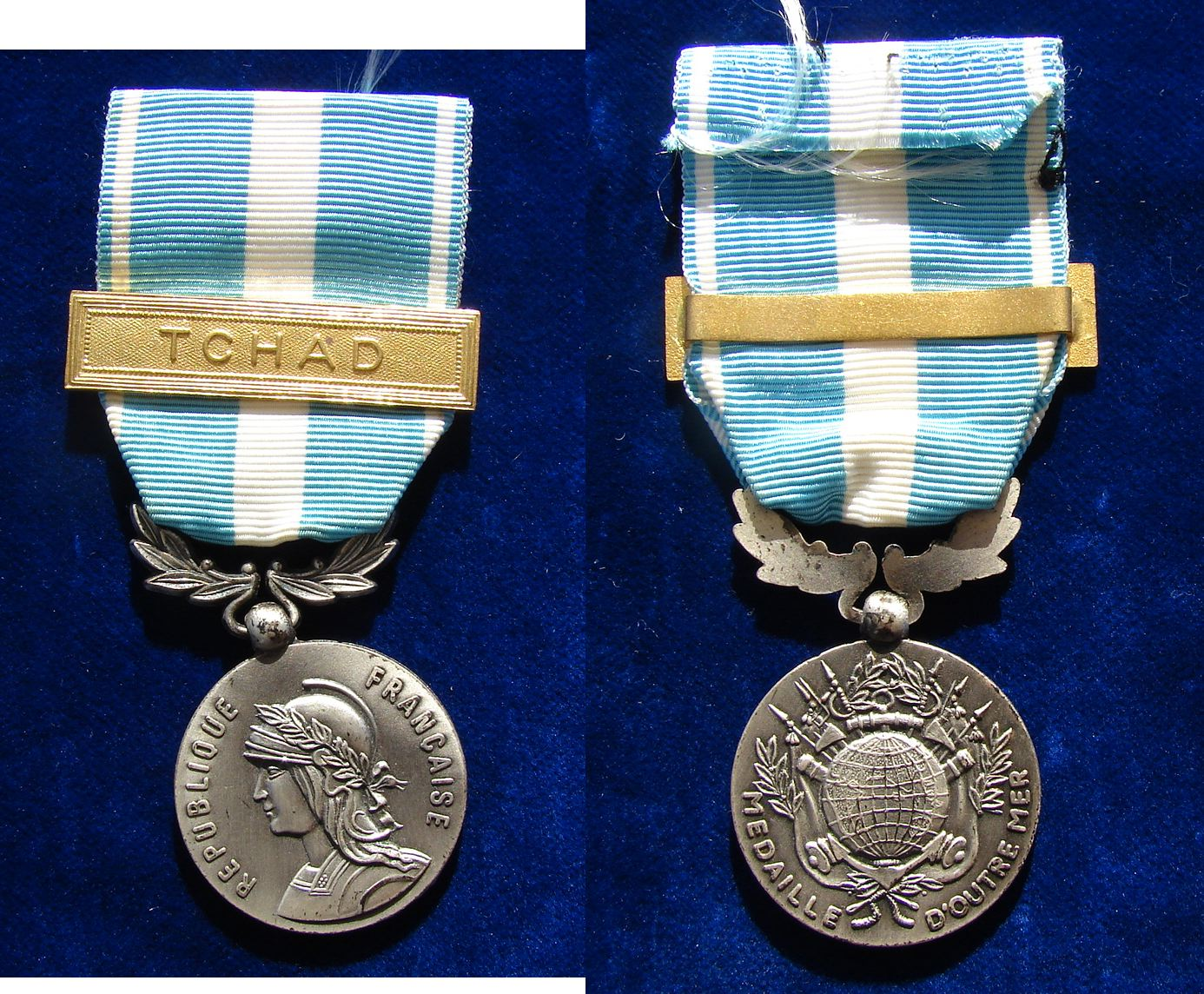
Médaille d' Outre Mer with original ribbon and "Tchad" clasp

== See also ==
- French North Africa

== Sources ==
- (in French) Les décorations françaises, ISBN 2-911468-99-6
- (in French) http://www.france-phaleristique.com/accueil.htm
