= 1st Foreign Parachute Regiment =

- 1^{er} Régiment étranger de parachutistes
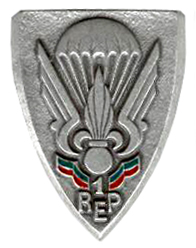
- Regimental insigne
- Active: July 1, 1948 – May 31, 1949; July 1, 1948 – September 1, 1955; February 25, 1955 – April 30, 1961
- Country: France
- Branch: French Army
- Type: Airborne Infantry
- Part of: Co. Para du 3^{ème} REI attached to III/1^{er} RCP (1948–1949) previously, the 1^{er} BEP in: 1^{er} BEP I Formation, 1948; 1^{er} BEP II Formation, 1951; 1^{er} BEP III Formation, 1954; 1^{er} REP, 1955; 10th Parachute Division, 1956
- Garrison/HQ: Camp de Jeanpierre (1959); Zéralda, Algeria
- Nicknames: Jeanpierre's Regiment; Jeanpierre's Legionnaires
- Motto: Marche ou crève
- Colors: Green and Red
- March: Contre les Viets
- Anniversaries: Camerone Day
- Engagements: First Indochina War: Battle of Route Coloniale 4; Battle of Hòa Bình; Operation Lorraine; Battle of Nà Sản; Operation Castor; Battle of Dien Bien Phu; Algerian War: Battle of Algiers; Bataille des Frontières; Suez Crisis; Algiers putsch of 1961

Commanders
- Notable commanders: Pierre Paul Jeanpierre; Hélie Denoix de Saint Marc
- Abbreviation: 1^{er} REP

The 1st Foreign Parachute Regiment (French: 1^{er} Régiment Etranger de Parachutistes, 1er REP) was an airborne regiment of the Foreign Legion in the French Army which dated its origins to 1948. The regiment fought in the First Indochina War as the three-time reconstituted 1st Foreign Parachute Battalion, the Suez Crisis and Algerian War, but was dissolved along with the 10th Parachute Division and 25th Parachute Division following the generals' putsch against part of the French government in 1961.

== Jeanpierre's regiment ==
Legion Lieutenant Colonel Pierre Paul Jeanpierre (1912–1958), was considered the patron and symbol of the 1st Foreign Parachute Regiment. The camp of the 1st Foreign Parachute Regiment was named after him in 1959.

== Successive unit designations ==
- 1 July 1948: Creation of the 1st Foreign Parachute Battalion (1er BEP, I Formation) (French: 1^{er} Bataillon étranger de parachutistes, 1^{er} BEP)
- 31 December 1950: Unit dissolved after its destruction during the Route Coloniale 4 fighting in September–October 1950.
- 8 March 1951: Reconstitution of 1st Foreign Parachute Battalion (II Formation)
- 25 April 1954: At Dien Bien Phu, the 1er BEP is destroyed as a fighting unit and along with the remnants of the 2ème BEP forms the Foreign Parachute Battalion de Marche (French: Bataillon de Marche Étranger de Parachutistes, or BMEP)
- 7 May 1954: The Battle of Dien Bien Phu ends, and the battalion's survivors become prisoners of the Việt Minh
- 19 May 1954: The 1st Foreign Parachute Battalion (III Formation) is recreated from reserves (that were not present at Dien Bien Phu), from legionnaires newly deployed to Indochina, and from para volunteers.
- May–December 1954: The 1er BEP is reorganized as a unit
- 1 September 1955: The unit is enlarged to a regiment and redesignated 1er REP
- 30 April 1961: Final disbanding of the 1st Foreign Parachute Regiment following the generals' putsch with Hélie de Saint Marc commanding.

== History ==
On 13 May 1948 a Groupement d'Instruction de Parachutistes was formed at Khamis, near Sidi Bel Abbès, Algeria for the purpose of raising two foreign parachute battalions. The 1st Foreign Parachute Battalion (1^{er} BEP, I Formation) (French: 1er Bataillon Étranger de Parachutistes, 1^{er} BEP) was created on 1 July 1948, under the command of Commandant Chef de bataillon Pierre Segrétain with adjoint battalion commander Pierre Jeanpierre while complementing the ranks with officers and legionnaires of the Parachute Company of the 3rd Foreign Infantry Regiment.

=== Indochina ===
The battalion boarded the transport ship Pasteur on 24 October 1948 at Mers El Kébir, and arrived in Indochina on 12 November that same year. During the entire period of conflict in Indochina, the unit primarily saw action in Tonkin (northern Vietnam).

As part of a consolidation of parachute-trained French formations the Compagnie Parachutiste du 3^{e} Régiment Etranger d'Infanterie was disbanded on 31 May 1949 and its men – 3 Legion officers, 14 Sous-officiers and 92 Legion corporals and legionnaires – were transferred to 1^{er} BEP (I Formation).

On 16 September 1950, the French post at Đông Khê was overrun, with only a small handful of survivors of the garrison making their way south to French lines at That Khe. In response, on September 17 and 18, the battalion jumped on That Khe in order to reinforce the combat command under Lieutenant-colonel Lepage, operating out of Lạng Sơn whose mission was to rescue the garrison of Cao Bằng which was evacuating the city along the Route Coloniale 4 (RC4). Following a consolidation of French forces at That Khe, the battalion led the French forces north towards Đông Khê with plans to retake the town, hold it long enough to link up with French forces retreating from the north, and then evacuate south. Although the two French groups were able to link up, heavy Việt Minh interdiction on the roads and constant ambushes in the thick jungle forced the French off the roads in an attempt to bypass the town, during what became known as the Battle of Route Coloniale 4. In so doing, the entire battle group was forced into the Coc Xa gorge, where it was destroyed piecemeal. An attempt to reinforce the battle group occurred on the night of 8 October when approximately 570 additional reinforcements from the 3ème Bataillon Colonial de Commandos Parachutistes) were dropped near That Khe in an attempt to draw the Việt Minh forces away from the gorge, but this operation became hopelessly bogged down and the reinforcements were cut to pieces in turn. The unit was almost entirely destroyed in the subsequent battle in October around Đông Khê, with only 130 men of the battalion remaining of the original 500 who jumped.

The battalion distinguished itself in its willingness to go to great lengths to evacuate their wounded through forbidding terrain, including an incident in which the men rappelled down a 75-meter cliff at the Coc Xa gorge with the wounded strapped to their backs. Over the course of the battle and subsequent engagements between 17 September and 30 October, the unit lost 21 legion officers, 46 legion NCO's and warrant officers, and 420 legionnaires killed or wounded, including the battalion commander, Pierre Segrétain leading and heading, killed in action the night of 7 October. Only isolated elements of the battalion were able to rejoin the French lines led by Pierre Jeanpierre, who would later command the regiment in Algeria. Having ceased to exist as a combat-worthy formation, the unit was disbanded on 31 December 1950.

The 1^{er} BEP reformed (II Formation) on 1 March 1951 from the survivors of the 1^{er} BEP (I Formation) (which had up to that point been attached to the 2^{ème} BEP), as well as legionnaires from the 2^{ème} BEP and reinforcements newly arrived from North Africa. Thus the battalion consisted of 3 companies, including a headquarters formation, the 1st and 2nd companies, and a company composed of Indochinese volunteers.

On 10 September 1951, the unit returned to combat during Operation Tulip, part of General de Lattre de Tassigny's effort to put the Việt Minh on the defensive around the Cho Ben pass, north of Hòa Bình. The operation was a tactical success with the battalion successfully assisting in the capture of Hòa Bình, but further counter-attacks by the Việt Minh in November convinced the French military command that they were overextended and as a result the area was evacuated, with the last units leaving Hòa Bình in February 1952.

Having reached an apparent stalemate in early 1952 around the Red River Delta, the French command again decided to go on the offensive, giving the plan the code name Operation Lorraine. On 9 November 1952, the 1st BEP and other airborne formations were dropped into combat near Phu Doan, capturing a quantity of Việt Minh supplies and securing the area. However, the operation failed in drawing the Việt Minh into a large, set-battle (as the French commanders had hoped), and as such the operation was abandoned and the remaining French forces were withdrawn on 16 and 17 November. The battalion was one of the formations selected to hold the rearguard post at Nà Sản, where it sustained a fierce assault from the Việt Minh between 23 November and 2 December 1952. The post was well-fortified and held in the face of overwhelming numbers, with the bloodied Việt Minh falling back after a week of fighting.

After falling back to the French defensive positions around the de Lattre line, the battalion was reorganized and reinforced, with a third company of legionnaires being added, bringing the total strength of the battalion to 4 combat companies: 3 Legion and 1 Indochinese. In addition, on 1 September 1953 the 1st Foreign Parachute Heavy Mortar Company was created and attached to the 1^{er} BEP (II Formation).

On 21 November 1953, the unit was dropped as part of the second wave of French troops into the area around Điện Biên Phủ as part of Operation Castor, with the objective of securing a World War II-era landing strip and drawing the Việt Minh into another pitched battle against a well-defended position. The operation was completed without incident, with the battalion digging in around Dien Bien Phu in late November 1953. During the Battle of Dien Bien Phu, the battalion was divided into mobile fire-brigades, with the primary focus being the Huguette forts, specifically Huguette 5. The 1 CEPML was stationed at Dominique 2 until the 14th of March, 1954, at which point it was shifted to various locations in the fort. Despite furious resistance, the 1st BEP (II Formation) is destroyed for a second time on 7 May 1954 with the final fall of Dien Bien Phu camp. The unit (1^{er} BEP, II Formation) lost 316 legionnaires killed in action over the course of the siege, not including those who subsequently died in captivity in Indochina.

=== Algeria ===
Following the Geneva Conference, on 1 February 1955, 1er BEP (III Formation) embarked on the steamship Pasteur in Saigon and arrived at Mers el-Kebir on the 24th of the same month.

On 1 September 1955, the 1^{er} BEP (III Formation) was expanded to a regiment-level formation and re-designated 1st Foreign Parachute Regiment. From that point on, the unit was based out of Zéralda.

On 6 November 1956, as part of the 10th Parachute Division, the regiment landed in Egypt at Port Said and Port Fuad as part of the French military force participating in the Suez canal crisis. It was evacuated piecemeal between 10 and 22 December 1956, at which point the towns were handed over to United Nations control.

From 1957 onwards, the regiment (1^{er} REP) was sent back to Algeria, first in Algiers, then in the djebel (mountains), and finally at Guelma. Regimental commander colonel Buchond partnered with Jeanpierre to lead operations.

Following the petrol route in the Sahara, combat operations engage the regiment non-stop in the region of Guelma. Their results were earned by the death of regimental commander Chef de Corps Legion Lieutenant Colonel Pierre Paul Jeanpierre; who fell to the enemy on 28 May 1958; as well as legion officers, legion sous-officiers and a couple of hundred legionnaires.

On the eve of the generals' putsch of April 1961, the regiment (1^{er} REP) was commanded by Hélie Denoix de Saint Marc, as Lt. Col. Guiraud was on leave.

With the agreement of the officers, Cdt. de Saint-Marc activated the regiment alongside the mutineers, and began the generals' putsch on 21 April by marching on Algiers. Following the failure of the putsch, the regiment (1^{er} REP) was disbanded on 30 April 1961, under the orders of Pierre Messmer, the French Minister of Defense. Upon being notified that their regiment (1^{er} REP) was to be disbanded and that they were to be reassigned, Legionnaires burned the Chinese pavilion acquired following the Siege of Tuyên Quang in 1884 and also blew up their barracks. The relics from the Legion's history museum, including the wooden hand of Captain Jean Danjou, accompanied the Legion to France. Also removed from Sidi Bel Abbès were the symbolic Legion remains of General Paul-Frédéric Rollet ("The Father of the Legion"), Prince Count Aage of Rosenborg, and Legionnaire Heinz Zimmermann (the last fatal casualty in Algeria).

It was during this time that the Legion acquired its parade song "Non, je ne regrette rien" ("No, I regret nothing"), a 1960 Édith Piaf song that their Sous-Officiers, Senior Corporals, Corporals and Legionnaires sang leaving their barracks for re-deployment following the Algiers putsch of 1961. The song has been a part of Legion heritage since then.

At that point, part of the regiment deserted and went over to the Organisation armée secrète (OAS). Those who did not join in the putsch were escorted back to France and detained at Fort de Nogent.

The 1st Foreign Parachute Regiment, part of the 10th Parachute Division, was dissolved on 30 April 1961. Both the 10th Parachute Division and 25th Parachute Division were disbanded following the generals' putsch. However, the 2nd Foreign Parachute Regiment, while part of the dissolved 25th Parachute Division, remained in existence as the only foreign parachute regiment in France and the Legion.

== Traditions ==
Except for the Legionnaires of the 1^{er} REP that conserve the Green Beret; the remainder of the French army metropolitan and marine paratroopers forming the 10th Parachute Division, the 25th Parachute Division and the 11th Parachute Brigade wear the Red Beret.

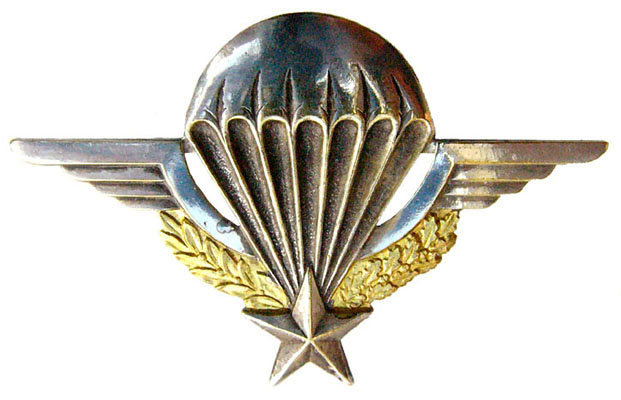
French Parachute Brevet.

=== Insignias ===
The insignia of the French metropolitan Paratroopers represents a closed "winged armed dextrochere", meaning a "right winged arm" armed with a sword pointing upwards. The Insignia makes reference to the Patron of Paratroopers. In fact, the Insignia represents "the right Arm of Saint Michael", the Archangel which according to Liturgy is the "Armed Arm of God". This Insignia is the symbol of righteous combat and fidelity to superior missions.

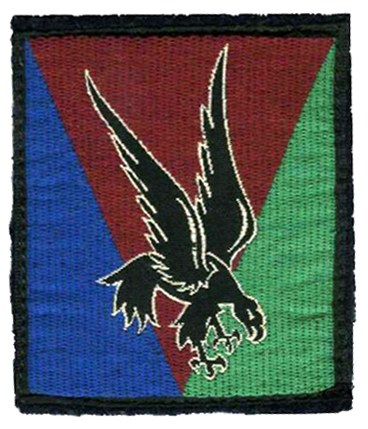
Insignia of the 10th Parachute Division of France

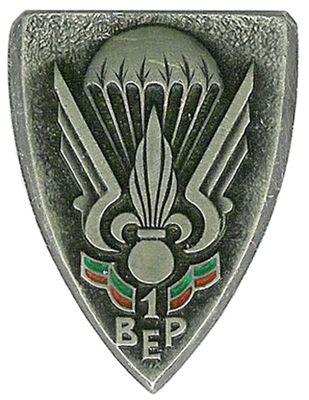
1^{er} BEP

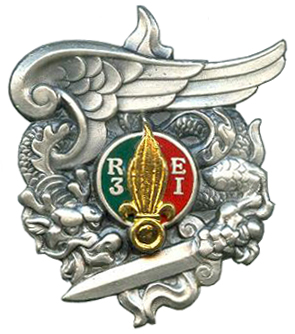
Co. Para du 3^{ème} REI in the 1^{er} REP and 1^{er} BEP

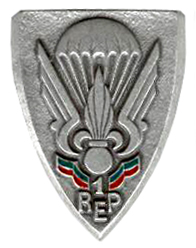
1^{er} REP

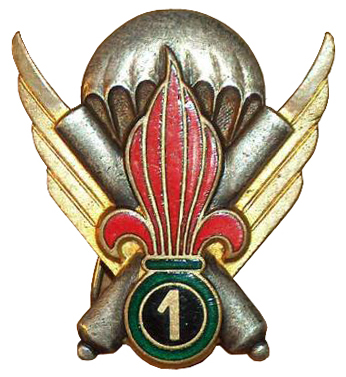
1^{ère} CEPML of the 1^{er} REP and 1^{er} BEP

=== Regimental and Battalion Songs ===
Chant de Marche: Contre les Viets featuring:

I

Contre les Viets, contre l'ennemi,
Partout où le devoir fait signe,
Soldats de France, soldats de pays,
Nous remonterons vers les lignes.

Refrain

O légionnaires, le combat qui commence,
Met dans nos âmes, enthousiasme et vaillance,
Peuvent pleuvoir grenades et gravats,
Notre victoire en aura plus d'éclat.
Peuvent pleuvoir grenades et gravats,
Notre victoire en aura plus d'éclat.

II

Et si la mort nous frappe en chemin,
Si nos doigts sanglants se crispent au sol,
Un dernier rêve: adieu à demain,
Nous souhaiterons faire école.

Refrain

III

Malgré les balles, malgré les obus,
Sous les rafales ou sous les bombes,
Nous avançons vers le même but,
Dédaignant l'appel de la tombe.

Refrain

=== Decorations ===
- Croix de guerre des théâtres d'opérations extérieures with 5 palms

=== Battle Honours ===
- Camérone 1863
- Indochine 1949–1954
- AFN 1952–1962

== Battalion and regimental commanders ==
Note (* †): Legion officers killed heading their battalions and regiments
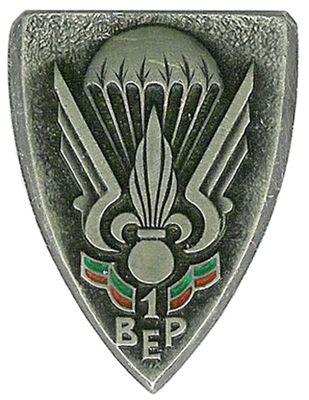
1^{er} BEP
1^{er} Bataillon Etranger de Parachutistes Tenure ( 1948–1955 ) – I, II, III Formations -

- 1948–1950: chef de bataillon Segrétain(* †) (I Formation, 1^{er} BEP)
  - Acting second-in-command Adjoint: Pierre Jeanpierre
- 1950–1950: captain Raffalli
- 1950–1950: captain Vieules
- 1951–1952: chef de bataillon Darmuzai
- 1952–1953: chef de bataillon Brothier
- 1953–1954: chef de bataillon Guiraud
- 1954–1954: captain Chalony (par intérim)
- 1954–1954: captain Hélie Denoix de Saint-Marc (by interim)
- 1954–1954: captain Germain
- November 1, 1954: chef de bataillon Pierre Jeanpierre (II Formation, 1^{er} BEP)
- May 19, 1954 – September 1, 1955: chef de bataillon Pierre Jeanpierre (III Formation, 1^{er} BEP)

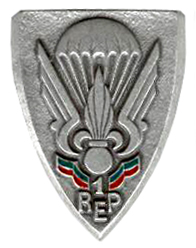
1^{er} REP
1st Foreign Parachute Regiment Tenure (1955–1961)

- September 1, 1955 – February 6, 1956: battalion commander chef de bataillon commandant Pierre Paul Jeanpierre
- 1956–1957: lieutenant colonel Brothier
- 1957–1958: Lieutenant Colonel Pierre Paul Jeanpierre (* †)
- 1958–1958: Commandant Jacques Morin
- 1958–1959: lieutenant colonel Brothier
- 1959–1960: lieutenant colonel Dufour
- 1960–1961: lieutenant colonel Guiraud
- April 20, 1961 – April 30, 1961: commandant Hélie Denoix de Saint Marc

== Notable officers and legionnaires ==
- Erwan Bergot
- Jean Luciani
- Jean-Marie Le Pen (Lieutenant)
- Jacques Peyrat (Lieutenant in the 1^{e} BEP)
- Pierre Sergent (Captain)
- Rémy Raffalli
- Hélie de Saint Marc (Commandant – Major)
- Roger Faulques (Commandant – Major)
- Louis Stien (Lieutenant in the 1^{er} BEP)
- Adjudant Szuts (1^{er} REP, 3^{ème} REI)
- Adjudant Tasnady (1^{er} REP)
- Adjudant Chef Valko, (1^{er} REP, 5^{ème} REI)
- Tony Hunter-Choat
