= 3rd Foreign Parachute Battalion =

- 3^{e} Bataillon Étranger de Parachutistes
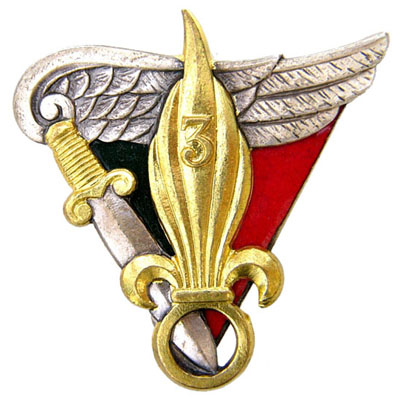
- Battalion Insignia
- Active: November 15, 1949 – September 1, 1955
- Country: France
- Branch: French Army
- Type: Airborne forces
- Part of: 3^{e} BEP I Formation, 1949; 3^{e} BEP II Formation, 1951; 3^{e} BEP III Formation, 1954; 3^{e} BEP IV Formation, 1954; 3^{e} REP, 1955
- Garrison/HQ: Sétif
- Colors: Green and Red
- Anniversaries: Camerone Day
- Engagements: First Indochina War; Algeria; Tunisia

Commanders
- Notable commanders: Darmuzai
- Abbreviation: 3^{e} B.E.P

The 3rd Foreign Parachute Battalion (French: 3^{e} Bataillon Étranger de Parachutistes, 3^{e} B.E.P) was a parachute battalion of the Foreign Legion formed based on the Parachute Instruction Company (C.I.P) of the 7th combat company of the 2nd Battalion of the 1st Foreign Infantry Regiment.

== History, Creation and different nomination designations ==
3^{e} Bataillon Etranger de Parachutistes, 3^{e} BEP - I, II, III, IV Formations -

Before becoming the 3rd Foreign Parachute Regiment; the 3rd Foreign Parachute Battalion was created in April 1949 at Mascara. The 7th combat company of paratrooper training of the 1st Foreign rejoins Sétif 7 months later, starting November 15, 1949, to become officially the 3rd Foreign Parachute Battalion. The mission of the 3^{e} BEP was to instruct and form the legionnaires destined to relieve the 1st Foreign Parachute Battalion (1^{er} B.E.P) and 2nd Foreign Parachute Battalion (2^{e} B.E.P). While mainly formed and created to instruct the Legionnaires, the 3rd Foreign Paratrooper Battalion participates in operations of maintaining order in Tunisia from January to June 1952.

On May 4, 1954; when struggle becomes of a rage at Dien Bien Phu, the 3^{e} BEP makes and clears way to Indochina. On May 25, 1954, the battalion is at Haïphong. On June 1, the count of the men forming the 3^{e} BEP is transferred to the 2nd Foreign Parachute Battalion during the reconstitution of the later. The 3^{e} BEP merges with the injured of annihilated foreign battalions while in the meantime, owing to numerous volunteers, the 3^{e} BEP is seen reconstituted at Sétif. Back to Algeria, the three foreign paratrooper battalions (1^{er} BEP, 2^{e} BEP, 3^{e} BEP) will be seen filling the ranks of the foreign regiment. On September 1, 1955, the 3^{e} BEP becomes the 3rd Foreign Paratrooper Regiment (3^{e} R.E.P). Based at Batna, the regiment becomes operational but then is dissolved on December 1, 1955; the men constituting the regiment are merged with the 2nd Foreign Parachute Battalion, (2^{e} B.E.P) to form a new corps, the 2nd Foreign Parachute Regiment.

The insignia of the 3rd Foreign Paratropper Battalion was created in 1950 by Captain Darmuzai, battalion commander Chef de Bataillon, CBA of the 3^{e} BEP.

== Traditions ==
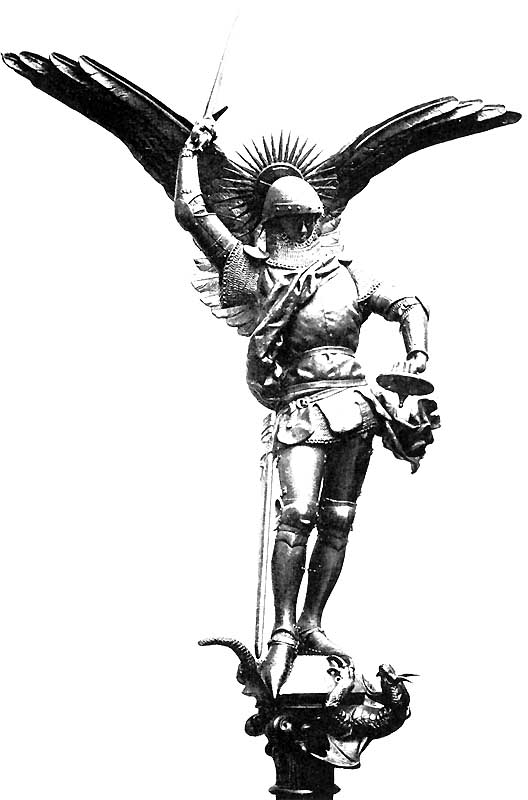
The Archangel Michael featured in Mont Saint-Michel and the Insignia of the 9th Parachute Chasseur Regiment.

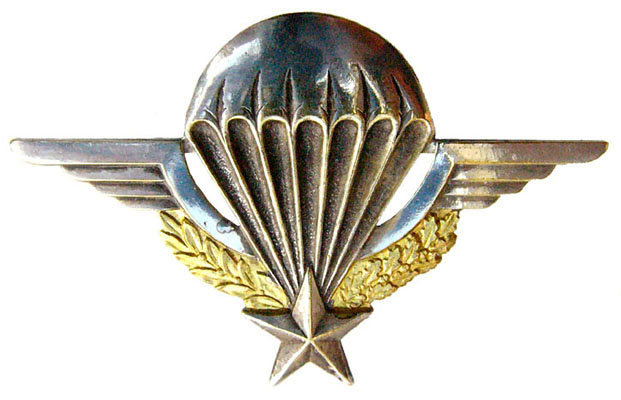
French Army Parachute Brevet.

=== Insignias ===
The insignia of the French metropolitan paratroopers represents a closed "winged armed dextrochere", meaning a "right winged arm" armed with a sword pointing upwards. The Insignia makes reference to the Patron of Paratroopers. In fact, the Insignia represents "the right Arm of Saint Michael", the Archangel which according to Liturgy is the "Armed Arm of God". This Insignia is the symbol of righteous combat and fidelity to superior missions.

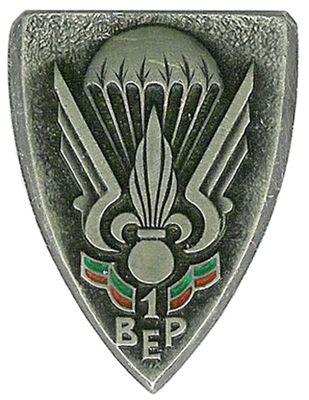
1^{er} B.E.P Insignia

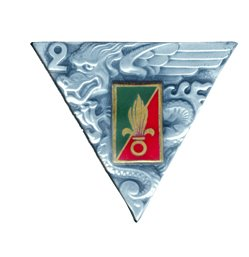
2^{e} B.E.P and 2^{e} R.E.P Insignia

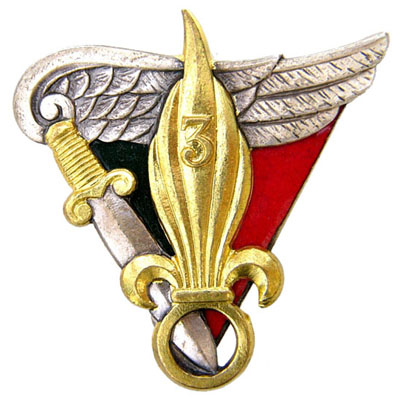
3^{e} B.E.P then 3^{e} R.E.P Insignia

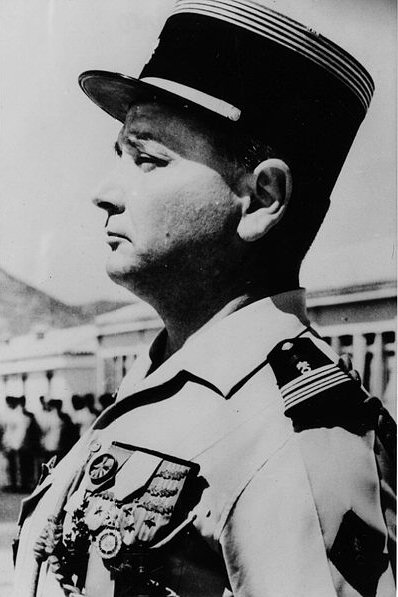
Colonel Paul Marie Félix Jacques René Arnaud de Foïard (1921-2005)

== Battalion Commanders ==
=== 3rd Foreign Parachute Battalion, 3^{e} BEP ( 1948 - 1955 ) - I, II, III, IV Formations - ===
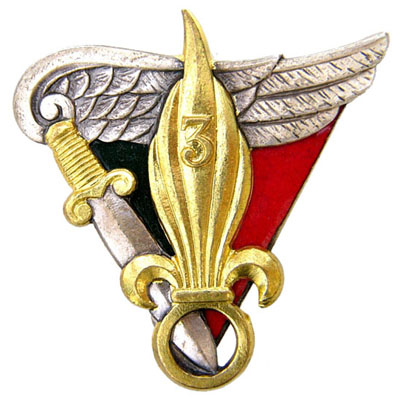
3^{e} Bataillon Etranger de Parachutistes 3^{e} BEP Tenure ( 1948–1955 )

- 1949 - 1951 : captain Pierre Darmuzai
- 1951 - 1952 : lieutenant-colonel Brothier
- 1952 - 1954 : chef de bataillon Dussert
- 1954 - 1955 : captain Pierre Darmuzai

== Notable Officers and Legionnaires ==
- Paul Arnaud de Foïard
- Pierre Segretain
- Pierre Jeanpierre
- Hélie de Saint Marc

== See also ==
- Major (France)
- French Foreign Legion Music Band (MLE)
