= Paul Arnaud de Foïard =

French Army general (1921–2005)

Paul Arnaud de Foïard

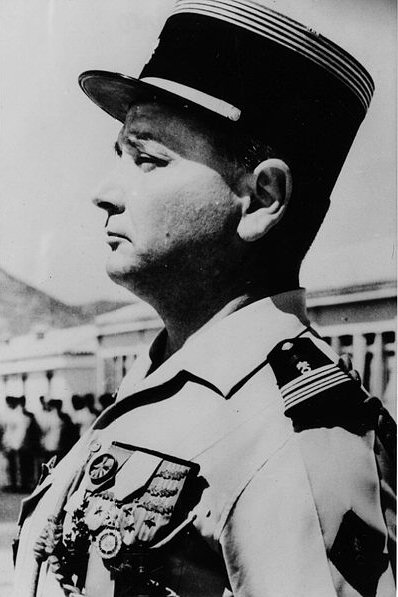
- Colonel. Arnaud de Foiard
- Born: 9 September 1921; Meudon, France
- Died: 7 August 2005 (aged 83); Nérac, France
- Military career
- Allegiance: France
- Branch: French Army; French Foreign Legion
- Service years: 1941–1981
- Rank: Général de corps d’armée
- Units: 501^{e} Régiment de chars de combat 501^{e} RCC; Marching Regiment of the Foreign Legion RMLE; 3rd Foreign Infantry Regiment 3^{e} REI; Parachute Company of the 3rd Foreign Infantry Regiment Co. Para du 3^{e}REI; I/1st Foreign Infantry Regiment I/1^{er} REI; II/4th Foreign Infantry Regiment II/4^{e} REI; 2nd Foreign Parachute Regiment 2^{e} REP; 1st Parachute Brigade 1^{re} BP
- Commands: 2nd Foreign Parachute Regiment 2^{e} REP; 11th Parachute Brigade 11^{e} BP
- Conflicts: World War II; First Indochina War; Algerian War

Paul Marie Félix Jacques René Arnaud de Foïard (9 September 1921 – 7 August 2005) was a général in the French Army who served primarily in the French Foreign Legion taking part in World War II and the conflicts of Indochina and Algeria.

== Military career ==
Paul Arnaud de Foïard fought in the resistance where he was captured and interned on 4 December 1942 until 3 June 1943. After escaping, he disembarked in Spain where he was interned at Figueras. He was liberated at Setubal in Portugal, and went to Morocco on 21 August.

During this time, he joined the 501^{e} Régiment de chars de combat 501^{e} RCC. He went to the instruction depot of Dellys, then joined the school of Cherchell as an aspirant. He was assigned to the Marching Regiment of the Foreign Legion with the rank of aspirant on 1 April 1944. With his unit, he participated in the disembarking at Saint-Raphaël in September, then to the offensive of the Ist Army, during which he was wounded by a mine. He was evacuated on 28 November 1944 and earned his first croix de guerre 1939–1945. It was at the head of his section in Germany that he was awarded the Médaille militaire in 1945.

On 8 February 1945 he was assigned to the 11th company of the Marching Regiment of the Foreign Legion. He led a platoon on 20 March 1945 at the crossroad south of Buchelberg, during the siege of Mulhausen on 4 April, on the bridge of Enns on the 7th, in Herrenberg on the 18th, at Hattingen on the 25th, and at Immendingen on the 26th. He was awarded three citations and the Médaille militaire. At the end of the war, he was sent to the École militaire interarmes.

de Foïard joined the 3rd Foreign Infantry Regiment on 20 December 1945. In February 1946 he was designated a sous-lieutenant to be effective 1 February 1944. He was then promoted to the rank of lieutenant on 1 February 1946.

He participated to the campaigns of Indochina. He went to Saigon and joined the 11th company of the 3rd Foreign Infantry Regiment on 11 June 1946. He was wounded by a machine gun, at My Duc Thay on 22 January 1947. On 23 October 1947 he was assigned the company of camions bennes CCB. Accordingly, he was awarded a new citation at the orders of the armed forces and the knight croix of the Légion d’honneur, bestowed on 14 July 1947. This last one was matched with the croix de guerre des TOE, for his personal action in Cai Lay in Cochinchine; at Am Thai Dong in the province of Mytho.

During the creation of the Parachute Company of the 3rd Foreign Infantry Regiment, Co. Para du 3^{e} REI, on 1 April 1948, he assumed the command of a platoon section under the order of lieutenant Jacques Morin. On 16 May he was awarded a citation at the orders of the division during a combat exchange battle at the fortified village of Tho Truong. Repatriated sanitary, he disembarked in Marseille, was hospitalized and benefitted of a break. He was assigned to the regional administrative company of Versailles.

Promoted to captain on 2 January 1952, he reassumed the service on 14 October 1952. He was entrusted with the command of the 2nd company of the 1st battalion of the 1st Foreign Infantry Regiment 1^{er} REI on the 20. On 13 March 1953 he commanded the platoons of the 1^{e} REI at Saida. In November he joined the moral service of the legion as editor-in-chief of Képi Blanc in Sidi Bel Abbès until dissolution in July 1955. He was then assigned in the qualities of a commandant of the 5th company of the 2nd battalion of the 4th Foreign Infantry Regiment 4^{e} REI at Fes in Morocco. The 5^{e} du 2/4^{e} REI became the 6^{e} CP du 4^{e} REI, on 16 November 1956. At the corps of this unit, he partook to operations of maintaining order in the Rif and notably at Hibel, Tembouzid, and Zoua Ouah. He was cited at the orders of the division with croix de la Valeur militaire on 11 July 1956. He joined metropole in 1957 and was assigned to the depot of the legion.

Detached the provisionary commando group, in qualities of an instructor in garrison at El Hadjeb from 16 February to 4 July 1956, he was awarded a citation at the orders of the armed corps. Another citation at the orders of the armed corps was conferred for another engagement. On 1 August 1957 he was assigned to the depot of the Legion in Marseille. He was promoted officer in the order of the Légion d’honneur on 18 December 1958. He joined the ESMIA de Coëtquidan groupment, on 1 June 1959. He was accordingly promoted to chef de bataillon on 1 October 1959.

He integrated the 74 promotion of the école supérieure de guerre in August 1960. Following, he was assigned to the operation means bureau of the 2nd Foreign Parachute Regiment 2^{e} REP, on 1 July 1962. On 1 October 1963 he was assigned to EMAT bureau, where he was promoted to the rank of lieutenant-colonel, on 1 October 1964. Designated during his command time, he embarked to Mers el Kebir and became regimental commander of the 2^{e} REP, on 1 June 1965 at Bou Sfer.

On 15 June 1967 the REP was repatriated on Corsica. With the finalization of this command tenure, he joined the EMA on 1 July. Accordingly, he was promoted to commander of the Légion d’honneur, on 14 July and to the rank of colonel, on 1 October. He was designated to serve at the 1st Parachute Brigade 1^{re} BP and placed in subsistence at the 420th command and service battalion on 1 August 1972. The following January he was promoted to rank of brigadier general.

In August 1974 he was designated in a director quality, hors-cadre, of the Secrétariat général de la défense et de la sécurité nationale, under the orders of the Prime Minister of France and occupied the vice-presidency of the permanent council for military service in 1975. Reintegrated, he joined the 11th Parachute Division 11^{e} DP and was division commander on 29 November 1975. He was promoted to division general, in December 1976.

Promoted to the rank and designation of a général de corps d’armée on 1 August 1979, he became director of the enseignement militaire supérieur of the French Army in October. On 17 September 1981 he was nominated as a grand officier de la Légion d’honneur. Attained by the reglementary age limit of his rank to the section of officer generals, on 10 September 1981.

== Decorations ==

- Grand Officier of the Légion d'Honneur
  - Commandeur of the Légion d'Honneur (1967)
  - Officier of the Légion d'Honneur (1958)
  - Chevalier of the Légion d'Honneur (1947)
- Médaille militaire (1945)
- Grand Croix of the Ordre national du Mérite (1966)
- Croix de guerre 1939-1945 (3 palms, 1 star)
- Croix de guerre des Théatres d'Opérations Exterieures
- Croix de la Valeur Militaire
- Médaille des Evades
- Croix du combattant volontaire (1939–1945)
- Croix du combattant
- Médaille coloniale with agrafe (clasp) « E.O »
- Knight of the Ordre des Palmes Académiques
- Médaille de la Jeunesse et des Sports
- Indochina Campaign commemorative medal
- North Africa Security and Order Operations Commemorative Medal with agrafes (clasps) « Algérie » and « Maroc »
- Bronze Star Medal, U.S. Army (U.S.)
- Officer of the Order of Ouissam Alaouite (Morocco)

He totalized 9 citations.

== See also ==
- Major (France)
- French Foreign Legion Music Band (MLE)
- Pierre Segretain
- Pierre Jeanpierre
- Helie de Saint Marc
- Roger Faulques
- Jacques Lefort, regimental commander 2nd Foreign Parachute Regiment 2^{e} REP (1958)
- Pierre Darmuzai, 2^{e} REP (1960)
- Saharan Méharistes Companies (méharistes sahariennes)
- Jeannou Lacaze, 2^{e} REP (1967)
- Bernard Goupil, 2^{e} REP (1972)
- Jean Brette, 2^{e} REP (1974)
- Philippe Erulin, 2^{e} REP (1976)
- Jean Louis Roué, 2^{e} REP (1978)
- Bruno Dary, 2^{e} REP (1994)
- Benoît Puga, 2^{e} REP (1996)
