= Hélie de Saint Marc =

French resistance member (1922–2013)

- Born: Hélie Denoix de Saint Marc; 11 February 1922; Bordeaux, France
- Died: 26 August 2013 (aged 91); La Garde-Adhémar, France
- Military career
- Allegiance: France
- Branch: French Foreign Legion; Foreign Airborne
- Service years: 1946–1961
- Rank: Commandant, Chef de Bataillon
- Units: 3rd Foreign Infantry Regiment; 3^{e} REI 1st Foreign Parachute Battalion; 1^{e} BEP; 2nd Foreign Parachute Battalion; 2^{e} BEP; Legion Indochinese Parachute Company; 2^{e} CIPLE; 1st Foreign Parachute Regiment; 1^{er} R.E.P 10th Parachute Division; 10^{e} DP
- Commands: 1st Foreign Parachute Regiment; 1^{er} R.E.P
- Conflicts: World War II; First Indochina War; Suez Crisis; Algerian War

Hélie Denoix de Saint Marc or Hélie de Saint Marc, (11 February 1922 – 26 August 2013) was a senior member of the French Resistance and a senior active officer of the French Army, having served in the French Foreign Legion, in particular at the heart and corps of the Foreign Airborne Battalions and Regiments, the heirs of the 2nd Foreign Parachute Regiment 2^{ème} REP, a part constituent of the 11th Parachute Brigade. Commandant by interim of the 1st Foreign Parachute Regiment 1^{er} REP (disbanded in 1961), Hélie assumed full responsibility for commanding exclusively his regiment towards the Generals' Putsch in April 1961 and would be charged for such action while also distancing accusations that would compromise the integrity of the men acting under his direct orders of command. He was rehabilitated within his civilian and military rights in 1978 and awarded the high distinction of the Grand-Croix of the Legion of Honor on 28 November 2011.

== Biography ==
=== Resistance and deportation ===
Hélie de Saint Marc entered the French resistance (network resistance of Jade-Amicol) in February 1941, at the age of 19 after assisting in Bordeaux at the arrival of the Army and French Authorities when the country was fully engaged in its events. He was stopped on the 14th of July 1943 at the Spanish borders and following a denunciation; he was deported to German Concentration Camp at Buchenwald.

He was sent to the Satellite Camp of Langenstein-Zwieberge for 2 years where mortality rates surpasses 90%; he went under mainly two cares and protection including a Latvian miner who actually saved his life the second time. The Latvian miner was in good shape and shared with Hélie food which he stole. Later, When the camp was liberated by U.S. American Forces; Hélie de Saint Marc was found unconscious in the barracks of the dead. Hélie had lost his memory and even forgot his own name recovering later in an American hospital. He was found among 30 living survivors only out of the 1000 deported to that camp.

At the end of World War II, at the age of 23, Hélie pursues his education at Saint-Cyr Military Academy.

=== First Indochina War ===
Hélie de Saint Marc deployed to French Indochina in 1948 with the French Foreign Legion along the 4^{e} REM then at the disposition of the 3rd Foreign Infantry Regiment 3^{ème} REI. He lived just like the Vietnamese partisans; learning their language and talking for long hours with Viêt-minh prisoners; trying to understand their motivation and their ways of conducting battle. Commandant of the intervention company in the high regions, he was in charge to recruit, instruct and command autochthones partisans in operations and mainly protect the respective civilian populations undergoing hostile effects.

Stationed at Tà Lùng, at the borders of China, among the minority people of Tho; he faced the loss of the post at the border taken by the Chinese Communist Party. In China, troops of Mao Zedong recently defeated the Nationalist Party; mainly Tchang Kai-check and were soon to dominate their Vietnamese neighbors. The war was about to take a major turn. The French Army suffered heavy losses. After 18 months, Hélie de Saint Marc and the French military were evacuated, with almost none of the partisans, and none of the villagers. "There is an order, you don't make an omelet without breaking eggs"; officials replied to Hélie when he questioned them about the fate of the villagers.

Hélie's unit was obliged to give "coups de crosse" ("crosse" refers the rifle butt). His unit rifle-butted the fingers of villagers and partisans trying to climb aboard the departing trucks. In his words "We abandoned them". Those that survived and managed to join the departing French troops talked about the massacre of those that aided the French. He called his memory of rifle butting the fingers of his allies his "yellow wound" and remained very disturbed about the abandonment of Vietnamese partisans following the orders of High Command.

Hélie returned a second time to Indochina in 1951 with the 2nd Foreign Parachute Battalion 2^{ème} BEP, shortly after the disaster of Battle of Route Coloniale 4 (RC4) in October 1950, which annihilated the total of the 1st Foreign Parachute Battalion 1^{er} BEP. He commanded the 2^{e} CIPLE Battalion (2nd Company of Vietnamese Parachute of the French Foreign Legion). During this deployment, he served with Chef de bataillon Rémy Raffalli, regimental commander of the 2nd Foreign Parachute Battalion 2^{ème} BEP, Adjudant Bonnin and Général Jean Joseph Marie Gabriel de Lattre de Tassigny, the High Commissioner, Commander-in-Chief in Indochina and Commander-in Chief of the French Far East Expeditionary Corps.

In 1953, Hélie then served in the 11^{e} Régiment Parachutiste de Choc. By definition, there was no information on this passage, however it was probable that he remained in Indochina.

Hélie then integrated the ranks of the 1st Foreign Parachute Regiment 1^{e} REP in 1954 and partook in the final combats of Indochina. The 1^{e} REP was repatriated to Zéralda in the departments of Algeria while commanded by Pierre Jeanpierre. During that time, Hélie was designated as a company commandant.

=== Suez Crisis ===
In 1956, Hélie partook with the 1^{e} REP during the Suez Crisis.

=== Algerian War and the Generals' Putsch ===
Recruited by Général Challe, Hélie de Saint Marc served during the Algerian War; notably alongside General Massu. In April 1961, he participated with the 1st Foreign Parachute Regiment 1^{er} REP which he commanded by interim to the Generals' Putsch; directed by General Challe in Algeria. The operation failed and within a couple of days Hélie de Saint Marc handed himself over as prisoner and taking full responsibility of the actions of the men under his command. He also made it clear not to question the integrity of his legionnaires as well as assuming sole responsibility for the outcome of the failed putsch.

As Hélie de Saint Marc explained at the court-martial trial of the foremost Military Tribunal on 5 June 1961, his decision to challenge as illegal the political decision to grant Algerian independence was essentially motivated by his wish not to abandon the harkis, recruited by the French Army to fight against the FLN; not to mention his total unwillingness to relive his difficult experience in Indochina. He agreed to support the April 1961 "Generals' Putsch" against President Charles de Gaulle. The putschists saw de Gaulle's transfer of power of Algeria to the FLN as a betrayal of France and a betrayal of the local population both indigenous and French colonial; particularly, French Colonial Regiments. The officers in revolt had seen exactly this behavior in Indochina among the Colonial Parachute Battalions and felt that this had to stop. As the putsch failed due to lack of political support, Hélie de Saint-Marc was condemned to 10 years criminal reclusion which can go from 10 to 30 years or life. He spent 5 years in the prison at Tulle before being pardoned on December 25, 1966.

During that time; Legionnaires from the French Foreign Legion acquired their parade song "Non, je ne regrette rien" (No, I don't regret anything), a 1960 Edith Piaf song that NCOs, Corporals and Legionnaires sang while marching out of their barracks for re-deployment following the Algiers putsch of 1961. The song has been a part of Legion heritage since then. The 2nd Foreign Parachute Regiment 2^{ème} REP remained the only foreign parachute regiment in the French Army.

=== 1960s ===
Following his pardon, he settled in Lyon with the help of Andre Laroche, the president of the deportation Federation and started a civilian career in the metal industry. In 1988, he became Director of personnel in a metal company.

By 1978, he was rehabilitated with full civil and military rights.

In 1988, one of his grand nephews, Laurent Beccaria, wrote his biography which turned to be a success. Accordingly, he decided to write his own autobiography which he published in 1995 under the title of "Les Champs de Braises. Mémoires" and which was crowned by the Prize Femina categories "Essay" in 1996. During 10 years, Hélie de Saint-Marc spent his time travelling to the United States, Germany and France and conducted numerous conferences. In 1998 and 2000, German translation and versions appeared for Champs de braises (Asche und Glut) and the Sentinelles du soir (Die Wächter des Abends) at the Atlantis editions.

In 2002, he published with August von Kageneck- a German Officer of his generation- his fourth book entitled Notre Histoire (1922-1945) ("Our History: 1922-1945"); a story that portrayed the souvenirs of that period; portraying their respective childhood and their vision of World War II.

At age 57; Hélie was decorated and awarded with the commander of the Légion d'honneur on 23 June 1979 by French President Valéry Giscard d'Estaing.

At age 80; Hélie was decorated and awarded with the grand-officer of the Légion d'honneur on 28 November 2002 by French President Jacques Chirac.

At 89 years of age; Hélie de Saint Marc was finally recognized and awarded the Grand-Croix de la Légion d'honneur, on 28 November 2011, by French President Nicolas Sarkozy.

== Funeral ==
Hélie de Saint Marc died on 26 August 2013. His funeral was conducted on 30 August by Philippe Barbarin, cardinal-archbishop of Lyon in the Lyon Cathedral in presence of the mayor of Lyon, general Bertrand Ract-Madoux, Chief of Staff of the French Army, representing the French Minister of Defense Jean-Yves Le Drian. Military Honors were pronounced and honored by general Bruno Dary at Place Saint-Jean. Hélie was laid to rest at la Garde-Adhémar (Drôme).

== Recognition and honors ==
=== Decorations ===
- Grand Croix of the Légion d'honneur, 28 November 2011
- Grand Officer of the Légion d'honneur, 28 November 2002
- Commandeur of the Légion d'honneur, 23 June 1978
- Croix de guerre 1939-1945 (1 citation)
- Croix de guerre des théâtres d'opérations extérieures (8 citations)
- Croix de la Valeur Militaire (4 citations)
- Médaille des Evadés
- Médaille de la Résistance
- Croix du combattant volontaire de la Résistance
- Croix du combattant
- Colonial Medal with "Far East" clasp
- Médaille commémorative de la guerre 1939–1945
- Medal of deportation and detention for acts of resistance
- Commemorative Medal of the Indochina Campaign
- Middle East Operations Commemorative Medal
- Commemorative Medal of Security and Maintaining Order Operations in North Africa with "Algerian" and "Tunisian" clasps
- Wounded soldiers badge (x2)
- Order of Civil Merit Sip Hoc Chau Thai, Officer

==== Posthumous hommage ====
Since 15 March 2015 a road bears his name in Béziers.

== Attributed quotations ==
- " Si on doit un jour ne plus comprendre comment un homme a pu donner sa vie pour quelque chose qui le dépasse, ce sera fini de tout un monde, peut-être de toute une civilisation."

English translation: If in one day, we may come to not understand how a man could have given his life for something which surpasses him, this would be the end of a world, perhaps the end of an entire civilization.

- Extrait de Que dire à un jeune de vingt ans... "À mon jeune interlocuteur, Je dirai donc que nous vivons une période difficile, où les bases de ce qu'on appelait la Morale et qu'on appelle aujourd'hui l'Éthique, sont remises constamment en cause, en particulier dans les domaines du don de la vie, de la manipulation de la vie, de l'interruption de la vie. Dans ces domaines, de terribles questions nous attendent dans les décennies à venir. Oui nous vivons une période difficile où l'individualisme systématique, le profit à n'importe quel prix, le matérialisme, l'emportent sur les forces de l'esprit."

English translation: Extract of what to tell to a twenty-year-old... I would say then that we live in a difficult period, where the corps bases of what is referred to as Moral that which is referred to today as the Ethics, are constantly being placed in cause, in particular in the domain of life, the manipulation of life, and the interruption of life. In these domains, terrible questions await us in the decades to come. Indeed, we live in a challenging period where systematic individualism, profit and the materials, are the dominant forces of the human spirit.

- Extrait de Que dire à un jeune de vingt ans..." Enfin, je lui dirai que de toutes les vertus, la plus importante, parce qu'elle est motrice de toutes les autres et qu'elle est nécessaire à l'exercice des autres, de toutes les vertus, la plus importante me paraît être le courage, les courages, et surtout celui dont on ne parle pas et qui consiste à être fidèle à ses rêves de jeunesse. Et pratiquer ce courage, ces courages, c'est peut-être cela « L'Honneur de Vivre »."

English translation: Extract of what to tell to a twenty-year-old... Finally, I would say that of all virtues, the most important, since it is the driving force of and the most necessary to exercise all other virtues, the most important seems for me that of courage, courages, and specially the one which is not talked about and which consists of remaining faithfully loyal to the dreams during the years of youth. Applying this courage, these courages, perhaps that such is the « Honor of living ».

== See also ==
- Major (France)
- French Foreign Legion Music Band (MLE)
- Foreign Airborne Battalions and Regiments of France
- Christian Piquemal

== Publications ==
- Les Champs de braises. Mémoires with Laurent Beccaria, édition Perrin, 1995, (ISBN 2262011184), Prix littéraire de l'armée de terre - Erwan Bergot in 1995, Prix Femina essai in 1996.
- Les Sentinelles du soir, édition Les Arènes, 1999, (ISBN 2912485029)
- Indochine, notre guerre orpheline, édition Les Arènes, 2000, (ISBN 2912485207)
- Notre histoire (1922-1945) with August von Kageneck, conversations recueillies par Étienne de Montety, édition Les Arènes, 2002, (ISBN 2912485347)
- Die Wächter des Abends, Édition Atlantis, 2000, (ISBN 3932711513)
- Asche und Glut. Erinnerungen. Résistance und KZ Buchenwald. Fallschirmjäger der Fremdenlegion. Indochina und Algerienkrieg. Putsch gegen de Gaulle, Édition Atlantis, 1998, 2003, (ISBN 3932711505)
- Toute une vie ou Paroles d'Hélie de Saint Marc written in collaboration with Laurent Beccaria, volume comprenant un CD audio d'émission radiophonique, édition Les Arènes, 2004, (ISBN 2912485770)
- La Guerre d'Algérie 1954-1962, with Patrick Buisson, foreword by Michel Déon (with DVD), Albin Michel, 2009 (ISBN 222618175X)
- PDF Lettre à la jeunesse by Hélie de Saint Marc
- L’Aventure et l’Espérance, édition Les Arènes, 2010, (ISBN 9782352040910)
- Lettre à la jeunesse (Letter to the youth) d'Hélie de Saint Marc

== Bibliography ==
- Laurent Beccaria, Hélie de Saint-Marc, éd. Perrin, 1989; reprint « Tempus », 2008.

== Documentaries ==
- Patrick Jeudy, Un homme d’honneur ( A Man of Honor), produit par Françoise Castro, 52 min. France 2, la Cinquième et Planète. 1996.
- Alain de Sédouy, « Le dernier engagement » ( The Last Engagement) d’Hélie de Saint Marc Édition ECPAD, 2008.
- Georges Mourier, Servir ? – Hélie de Saint Marc ( Service ?), Coll. Le choix des hommes, 52 min, Édition À l’image près, 2008.
