= Georges Hamacek =

- Born: 1 December 1923; Paris, France
- Died: 11 May 1953 (aged 29); Mort pour la France; Dong Dahn, Laos
- Military career
- Allegiance: France
- Branch: French Army
- Service years: 1945-1953
- Rank: Captain
- Commands: 4th Company, 2e BEP
- Conflicts: World War II; First Indochina War

Georges Marion Pierre Hamacek (1 December 1923 – 11 May 1953) was a French Army officer, who fought in World War II in the French Resistance and in the First Indochina War in the Foreign Legion.

== Biography ==
Georges Hamacek was born in a family of Czech immigrants. He joined the resistance network Turma-Vengeance in January 1944 before joining the Maquis Bernard in Morvan. There he quickly raises in the ranks, becoming a deputy section chief, and earning the Croix de Guerre with two citations. When the war ends he enrolls at the École militaire interarmes on 3 July 1945 and graduates on 15 December the same year with the rank of Second Lieutenant. He chooses the Foreign Legion and was sent to the 1st Battalion, 3rd Foreign Infantry Regiment in Aubagne.

He volunteered for service in the Far East and landed in Saigon in June 1946. At the end of 1947, the battalion was sent to patrol the RC 4, where Lieutenant Hamacek receives another citation. He also receives the Légion d’honneur for his repeated acts of courage and command of the 1st Company of the 1st Battalion, 3rd Foreign Infantry Regiment. In 1951, Hamacek was transferred to the 3rd Foreign Parachute Battalion (3e BEP) and then the 2nd Foreign Parachute Battalion in 1952. He was killed in action in Laos on 11 May 1953.

The 1989-1992 promotion of the Saint Cyr Military Academy was named Capitaine Georges Hamacek in his honour.

== Decorations ==
- Knight of the Légion d’honneur
- Croix de guerre 1939-1945
