= Operation Pomone =

- Part of First Indochina War
Date	April 3–May 29 1949 (Phase I); May 7–May 31 1949 (Phase II)
Location	Tonkin, French Indochina
Result	French victory: Disruption of Viet Minh logistics

Belligerents
French Union: France; French Indochina	Democratic Republic of Vietnam: (North Vietnam) Việt Minh

Commanders and leaders
Lt. Col Carbonel	Unknown

Casualties and losses
21 killed ~100 wounded	170+ killed 50 captured

Operation Pomone (French: Opération Pomone) was a two-phase French military offensive conducted in the Tonkin region of Northern Vietnam from late April to May 1949 to secure the strategic sector between the Red and Clear Rivers.

== Operation ==
=== Operation Pomone I ===
Operation Pomone I from April 29 until May 3, which utilized the 1st Foreign Parachute Battalion (1er BEP), and the 2nd Colonial Parachute Regiment (2e RCP) and successfully landed two companies at Phu Doan and another at Tuyen Quang with their objective to root out and destroy Viet Minh weapons and supply caches. By the end of the operation, 50 Viet Minh were captured.

=== Operation Pomone II ===
This set the stage for Operation Pomone II from May 7 until May 31. The following main French units participated under the overall command of Lieutenant-Colonel Carbonel:

- Parachute Units
  - 1er B.E.P. (1st Foreign Parachute Battalion) core unit of the operation.
  - 1er R.C.P. (1st Parachute Chasseur Regiment) three companies of parachute infantry battalion
- Ground and Supporting Forces
  - B.M.I. (Indochinese Marching Battalion) a composite "marching" battalion of Indochinese and French troops.
  - 10ème Tabor: A unit of Moroccan colonial troops.
  - 8ème R.S.M. (8th Moroccan Spahi Regiment) several cavalry elements.
  - 8ème R.S.A. (8th Algerian Spahi Regiment) several cavalry elements.

On May 12 at 09:00, paratroopers of the 1er BEP (1st Foreign Parachute Battalion) seized Tuyên Quang, which had been abandoned by Viet Minh forces. Despite the capture, Viet Minh artillery positioned across the river engaged French forces, targeting supply aircraft and wounding several paratroopers. French units subsequently located and destroyed these artillery positions.

On the evening of May 16, French forces withdrew to a village south of Tuyên Quang before advancing toward Phu Hien, which was captured on May 18. On May 20, paratroop engineers located and demolished a Viet Minh weapons workshop northwest of the town. Subsequent patrols in the Dong No area resulted in brief contact with Viet Minh elements, however the Viet Minh successfully withdrew, French forces confiscated twenty sampans along the Sông Chảy River. Having met its primary objectives, the expeditionary force began its withdrawal toward the Red River Delta.

On May 24 French forces advanced along the Clear River. The 2nd Battalion, 1st RCP led the right bank, supported by the 1er BEP, while the 8th RSA secured the left bank. On May 25, the 2nd Battalion was heavily ambushed by entrenched Viet Minh forces near Le My. The 1er BEP's 1st Company, under Lieutenant Guy de Carvalho, moved to reinforce the position. The 1st RCP suffered significant losses, including Lieutenant Lucien Mellot and six paratroopers killed. By May 26, the Viet Minh abandoned their positions. The column continued downstream but was halted at 15:00 when the 8th RSA was ambushed near Thon Noi, sustaining two casualties. On May 27, the 10th Tabor took the lead. Renewed fighting broke out on the left bank while the 1er BEP secured a supply airdrop near Ha Giap under concentrated enemy fire. On May 28, the 1er BEP and 10th Tabor reached Tien Du, entering the Operation Pomone I sector. A firefight near Phu Nham resulted in a dozen Viet Minh killed and one mortally wounded French later dying from his wounds. After regrouping at Nha Mon, the 1er BEP occupied Trinh Nu. On May 29, the column passed Tu Da, where one French was wounded by a mine during a sweep of An Lao.

By 18:00 on May 29, French forces reached Viet Tri. The 1er BEP established a temporary encampment at the local airfield. The following day, May 30, the battalion transitioned to the left bank of the Clear River, opposite the city, to recover from the previous weeks of combat. At 13:00, the 1er BEP departed Viet Tri for Hanoi, traveling via the Red River aboard Landing Craft Tanks (LCT). The battalion disembarked in the capital at approximately 21:00, marking the conclusion of their involvement in the operation.

Operation Pomone II concluded French forces considered a successfully disrupted Viet Minh logistics by locating and destroying a significant volume of military equipment and workshops throughout the Tuyên Quang and Phu Hien sectors. The Viet Minh suffered more than 170 killed, 50 captured, and substantial amount of equipment, including approximately 40 mortars, various depots, and ammunition stockpiles. French losses were 21 killed and around 100 wounded.
