= Đông Khê (disambiguation) =

Đông Khê may refer to several places in Vietnam:

- Đông Khê, a commune of Cao Bằng province
- Đông Khê, Haiphong, a former ward of Ngô Quyền District
- Đông Khê, Thanh Hóa, a former rural commune of Đông Sơn District
