= Jean Raoux (soldier) =

French général de brigade

- Born: 1916; Dellys, Algeria
- Died: 11 January 2004 (aged 87–88) Paris, France
- Allegiance: France; Free French Forces
- Branch: Army
- Service years: 1939–1972
- Rank: Général de brigade
- Conflicts: Second World War; Indochina; Algeria
- Awards: Officier de la Légion d'honneur Croix de guerre 1939-1945; Croix de Guerre des TOE; Croix de la Valeur militaire

Jean Raoux (1916 – 11 January 2004) was a French général de brigade, who began his career during the Second World War and later fought in Indochina and Algeria.

== Life ==
=== Early life ===
Jean Raoux was particularly noted for his knowledge of Arabic, completed by a licence ès lettres. In his youth he frequently met with the writer Albert Camus in Algiers.

=== Education ===
- Prepara Saint-Cyr at La Corniche (Alger)
- Ecole Spéciale Militaire de Saint-Cyr, promotion Marne et Verdun (1937–1939)
- Breveté at the Ecole de Guerre (Doctorate in National Defence on the American defence strategy under FD Roosevelt)
- Diplômé at the Ecole d'Etat-Major
- Licence in Arabic (Institut National des Langues et Civilisations Orientales)
- Licence in English
- Licence Es lettres

=== Second World War ===
- 1939 – Sous-Lieutenant – Assigned to the Caserne de Châteauroux to train reservists before the Battle of the Ardennes
- 1940 – Lieutenant – Fought in the Ardennes during the Battle of France
- June 1940 – Captured by the Germans and escaped
- 1941 – In the Free Zone he rejoined the 152e régiment d'infanterie
- 1942 – At Clermont-Ferrand (then in the Free Zone) he married Marie-Paule Solelis (1920 – 5 October 2009) then returned to Algiers
- 1942 – He joined the 16e régiment de tirailleurs algériens at Tlemcen and fought in the North African campaign
- 1942 – Birth of his eldest daughter Marie-Françoise
- January – May 1943: Fought against the Germans in the Tunisian campaign
- 1944 – He commanded a company of the 1st demi-brigade de Zouaves
- 15 August 1944 – Participated in Operation Dragoon, landing at Cavalaire
- 20 November 1944 – He actively participated in the liberation of Mulhouse under the command of Général de Lattre de Tassigny and joined the advance into Germany
- February 1945 – Birth of his son Bernard
- 1945 – Under the orders of Colonel de Pouilly, he joined the 1re Division Blindée at Besançon

=== Indochina ===
- 1946: Captain: 10e Promotion de l'Ecole d'Etat-Major
- 17 December 1948: Birth of his daughter Catherine (married Joannidès in 1972) at Besançon
- 1948–1952: Put in command of 1re région militaire
- 1952–1955: Appointed to the France's High Commission to Laos; operated in Cochinchina at the head of a unit of Cambodians

Also whilst in Indochina he was councillor to his majesty Norodom Sihanouk, king of Cambodia, as well as Maréchal de Lattre de Tassigny's personal English translator. He also met Graham Greene in Indochina and advised him on the publication of his The Quiet American.

=== Algeria ===
- 1955–1958: Ministère des Armées, liaison officer with the British Army
- 1958–1960: Chef de bataillon in the Aures
- Councillor to his majesty Hassan II of Morocco

=== Later career ===
- 1964: Ecole supérieure de guerre
- 1966–1968 – Colonel: Commandement of the 75e régiment d'infanterie de ligne at Valence
- 1969–1972 – Groupe d'organisation des manoeuvres nationales to the Ecole Militaire in Paris, where his son Bernard, Sous-Lieutenant joined him in the Groupe de Recherche Opérationnelle de l'Armée de Terre
- 1972 – Made Général in the Conseil des Ministres

== Decorations ==

=== Honours ===
- Officer of the Légion d'Honneur
- Commander of the Ordre National du Mérite
- Croix de guerre 1939-1945 (three citations)
- Croix de guerre des TOE with Palm
- Croix de la Valeur Militaire with Palm
- Chevalier dans l'ordre du Mérite Agricole
- Médaillé du Corps expéditionnaire français d'Extrême-Orient (Vietnam, Laos, Cambodia)
- Médaillé des opérations de sécurité et de maintien de l'ordre en Algérie
- Decorated in the Order of a Million Elephants (Laos)

== Citations ==
He won six citations, of which two were in dispatches.

=== Tunisian campaign (citation in the divisional orders with the Croix de guerre) ===
A young company commander full of distinction, he distinguished himself, repeatedly engaging his unit and particularly in the valley of Oued Kebir on 17 and 25 April 1943, installing his artillery in difficult conditions under heavy fire. He then completed many missions in the plain of Pont-du-Thas, on 27, 28 and 29 April. Under heavy artillery and infantry fire he found the body of a chef de bataillon killed that morning. He continued [fighting] in the battles of 9 to 12 May (Nord de Zaghouan) to guarantee connections under violent enemy artillery fire.

=== French campaign (three days after entering the campaign) ===
An energetic and brave young officer, on 27 September 1944 he and his section were charged with covering the clearance of axis M...- la ch... Conducting an advance in force of several kilometres neutralising repeated resistance where pointing to the tanks and clearing his section in a final assault that left eight prisoners in his hands.
