= Pierre Segrétain =

French army officer (1909–1950)

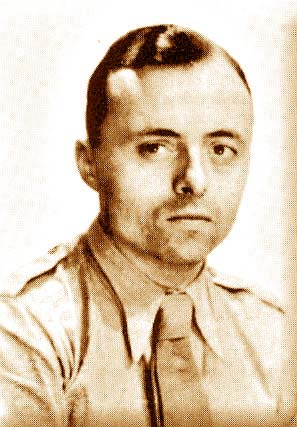
- Born: 7 November 1909; Saint-Mihiel, France
- Died: 8 October 1950 (aged 40); Mort pour la France; Coc Xa, Vietnam
- Military career
- Allegiance: France
- Branch: French Infantry; Foreign Legion; French Airborne
- Service years: 1930–1950
- Rank: Legion Commandant,Chef de Bataillon
- Units: 35th Infantry Regiment; 1st Foreign Regiment 1^{er} RE; 2nd Foreign Infantry Regiment 2^{ème} REI; 6th Foreign Infantry Regiment 6^{ème} REI; 20th Colonial Infantry Regiment; Marching Regiment of the Foreign Legion RMLE; 1st Parachute Chasseur Regiment 1^{er} RCP; 1st Foreign Parachute Battalion 1^{er} BEP
- Commands: 1^{er} BEP (1948-1950) (I Formation): 1st Foreign Parachute Battalion
- Conflicts: World War II • Battle of France • Syria-Lebanon Campaign • Tunisia Campaign; First Indochina War • Battle of Route Coloniale 4

Pierre Côme André Segrétain (7 November 1909 – 8 October 1950) was a French infantry and airborne officer of the French Army who fought in World War II and the First Indochina War, primarily in Foreign Legion units. He received command of the 1st Foreign Parachute Battalion (1 BEP) when the battalion was created in 1948 and led for two years in Indochina before being fatally wounded while leading his battalion during the Battle of Route Coloniale 4.

== Early life ==
Pierre Segretain was born in a French military family. His father was a colonel, his grandfather a division general of the French military engineers (French: Génie militaire). He served two years of corniche at the Lycée privé Sainte-Geneviève at Versailles before attending École spéciale militaire de Saint-Cyr in 1930.

== Military career ==
=== Prewar ===
He graduated from Saint-Cyr in the Général Joseph Joffre promotion and was assigned to the 35th Infantry Regiment at Belfort as platoon commander (Lieutenant) then transmission officer. In May 1936, he volunteered for service in the 1st Foreign Regiment (1 RE) at Sidi-bel-Abbès. He served in Algeria and Morocco with the 2nd Foreign Infantry Regiment (2 REI) in 1938 and the 6th Foreign Infantry Regiment (6 REI) in 1939.

=== World War II ===
With the outbreak of World War II, he belonged to the Legion group of the French Levant and volunteered to fight in France in the 20th Colonial Infantry Regiment. He first saw action at Saint-Gervais. Promoted to Captain, in December 1940, he sailed to Beirut to rejoin the 6 REI with whom which he fought against the British and Free French Forces in the Syria-Lebanon Campaign in June–July 1941.

Following Operation Torch in November 1942, his regiment joined the Allies and engaged in the Tunisia Campaign against the Afrika Korps. At Loukanda, he led his company against a superior enemy. In July 1943, he participated in the creation and reforming of the Marching Regiment of the Foreign Legion (R.M.L.E.). The unit landed in southern France in Operation Dragoon and he served with them until the fighting in Germany. He would be made knight of the order of the Legion of Honor.

=== Indochina War ===
In 1945, he was assigned to Coëtquidan, where, as unit Commandant, he was in charge of training transmission units. After earning his paratrooper brevet at Pau, he was assigned to the 1st Parachute Chasseur Regiment (1 RCP).

He was the first commander of the 1st Foreign Parachute Battalion (1 BEP), created on 1 July 1948 at Khamisis, creating also the battalion insignia. In November 1948, the battalion departed to French Indochina, with Captain Pierre Jeanpierre serving as second in command.

During September 1950, 1 BEP received the mission to retake the town of Dong Khé on Route Coloniale 4 from the Viet Minh. 1 BEP was trapped by the Viet Minh in the Coc Xa gorge and was annihilated. He died of wounds during the night of 7–8 October 1950, while the remaining survivors of the battalion filtered across Viet Minh lines to That Khe.

== Honours and awards ==
He received 8 citations during his career, including:

- Knight of the Légion d'honneur.
- Croix de guerre 1939-1945 with silver star.
- Croix de guerre des Théatres d'Opérations Extérieures with 3 palms.

== Legacy ==
The 193rd promotion of the École spéciale militaire de Saint-Cyr chose the name promotion Chef de bataillon Segretain.
