= Battle of Nghĩa Lộ (1951) =

Battle of the First Indochina War

Coordinates: 20.9833°N 106.0500°E

- Part of the First Indochina War
Date	3–10 October 1951
Location	Nghĩa Lộ, Yên Bái Province. Vietnam
Result	French Union victory

Belligerents
Democratic Republic of Vietnam: (North Vietnam) Việt Minh	French Union; France; State of Vietnam; T'ai Federation

Commanders and leaders
Lê Trọng Tấn	Rémy Raffalli

Strength
8,479	Three French airbone battalions One artillery battalion One Tai battalion (1e RTA); Total: ~2,500

Casualties and losses
Western estimate: 1,000–4,000 killed Việt Minh's report: 287 killed, 702 wounded, 22 missing	36 French killed Unknown Tai's killed or wounded 255 captured

The Battle of Nghĩa Lộ (Vietnamese: Nghĩa Lộ), also called Ly Thuong Kiet Campaign by Việt Minh, was fought between forces of the French Union and Việt Minh during the First Indochina War. Both general Giap and de Lattre waited eagerly for the battle due to the postponement that occurred when Giap's attack along the Day River were driven back in June 1951. Since Giap was the one controlling the tempo of this war for months, it took a huge turn during the pause after his defeat causing his military situation to become unstable. On 3 October, the Việt Minh 312th Division launched an attack on French forces in the town of Nghĩa Lộ and its vicinity which was led by the general Giap. This attack on Nghĩa Lộ occurred 95 miles west of Hanoi and only 65 miles past that of the western de Lattre Line. This village was the utmost importance to de Lattre because it served as the capital of the T'ai natives (in the Sip Song Chau Tai, an autonomous territory of the State of Vietnam), which had very strong ties with the French. The first attacked was carried out by two regiments of the 312th Division to the surrounding posts that acted as the main defense of the town in order to maintain military control. Since de Lattre was not present at the time, General Salan took the reins of the situation and quickly reinforced the surrounding posts with paratroopers carried by parachutes to fortify defenses. This quick strategy by General Salan was looked upon the saving grace of this battle since it repelled a secondary attack by two regiments of the 312th Division that same night. Additional reinforcements occurred during the 4th of October along with air support which led to General Giap to call off his attack which they then fled across the Red River. A year later on 17 October, the Việt Minh launched another attack on Nghĩa Lộ and succeeded in driving out the remaining French from the area.
