= 2nd Foreign Parachute Battalion =

- 2^{e} Bataillon Étranger de Parachutistes
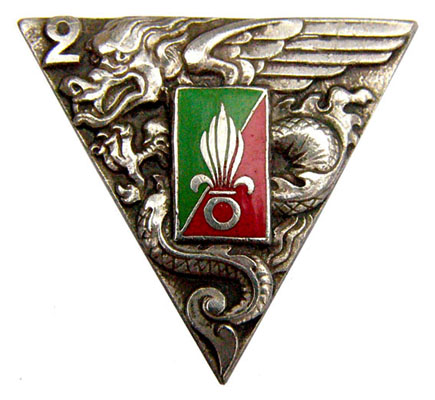
- Battalion Insignia
- Active: 2nd Foreign Parachute Battalion; 1 October 1948 – 1 December 1955; 2nd Foreign Parachute Regiment; 1 December 1955 – 2^{e} REP
- Country: France
- Branch: French Army
- Type: Airborne
- Role: Airborne force Close-quarters combat Counter-insurgency; Desert warfare Jungle warfare Raiding; Reconnaissance
- Size: Battalion
- Part of: 2^{e} B.E.P I Formation, 1949; 2^{e} B.E.P II Formation, 1951; 2^{e} B.E.P III Formation, 1953; 2^{e} B.E.P IV Formation with 3^{e} B.E.P, 1954; 3^{e} B.E.P redesignated 2^{e} B.E.P, 1954; 2^{e} B.E.P V Formation, 1955; 2^{e} R.E.P in 1955
- Garrison/HQ: Setif; Philippeville
- Colors: Green and Red
- Anniversaries: Camerone Day
- Engagements: First Indochina War

Commanders
- Notable commanders: Rémy Raffalli
- Abbreviation: 2^{e} B.E.P

The 2nd Foreign Parachute Battalion (French: 2^{e} Bataillon Étranger de Parachutistes, 2^{e} B.E.P) was a parachute battalion of the Foreign Legion in the French Army initially composed of volunteers of the 4th Demi-Brigade of the Foreign Legion (4^{e} D.B.L.E).

== History, creation and different nomination designations ==
2^{e} Bataillon Etranger de Parachutistes, 2^{e} BEP

The 2nd Foreign Parachute Battalion was created on 1 October 1948 by execution of a ministerial prescription dating to 27 March 1948. The combat companies of the 2^{e} BEP were constituted by the 4th Demi-Brigade of the Foreign Legion (4^{e} D.B.L.E) in Morocco and the depot of the foreign regiments in Sidi-bel-Abbès, were assigned by the 25th Airborne Division Element (French: 25^{e} Elément Divisionnaire Aéroporté, EDAP/25). Composed of one command company and three combat companies type fusiliers-voltigeurs, the battalion makes and clears way to Oran on 19 January 1949, destined for Indochina. Disembarked in Saïgon on 9 February, the battalion is directed to Kep (Cambodia) by land route. In November 1949, the battalion takes base in Quan Thé.

The first combat engagements of the 2^{e} BEP have for theatre of operations, Cambodia, Cochinchine and Annam. In October 1950, the 2^{e} BEP is summoned to Tonkin. Reinforced by a heavy mortars company, the battalion engages in all military operations in the Delta, in Thaï lands, Mékong and the plains of Jarres. The impressive series of combat engagements are earned at the battle of Nghia Lo, colonial route N°6 (RC6), Hoa Binh and the defense of the camp by an airborne operation on Langson. Crowned of a magnificent epoque, the 2^{e} BEP makes and clears way to Dien Bien Phu on 9–10 April 1954 in the middle of the furnace. Following the couter-attack of supporting point "Huguet", led by a rare determination during the night of 22–23 April; the 2^{e} BEP and the 1st Foreign Parachute Battalion (1^{er} B.E.P) merge to form a single foreign marching battalion. On 7 May the foreign marching battalion is dissolved and the 2^{e} BEP is recreated by members of the 3rd Foreign Parachute Battalion. On 1 June 1954, the 2^{e} BEP leaves Asia on 1 November 1955. The colors of the battalion are decorated with 6 citations at the orders of the armed forces and the fourragère of the colors of the Legion of Honor. The losses of the 2^{e} BEP rises to 1500 Legion officers, warrant officers, non-commissioned officers and Legionnaires killed along with their "chef de corps", Legion commandant Barthélémy Rémy Raffali leading and heading a traditional Foreign Legion battlefield. Returned to Algeria, the 2nd Foreign Parachute Battalion (2^{e} BEP) becomes the 2nd Foreign Parachute Regiment on 1 December 1955.

The insignia of the 2nd Foreign Parachute Battalion was created in 1949, in Cambodia. The battalion insignia represents an eastern winged dragon making reference to the original implementation in Asia. The three point triangular shape of the insignia represents the form of an open Parachute; center by the flag colors of the legion; and is symbol of the perfection that is expected of the men serving this regiment. The battalion was commanded at the time by commandant Solnon (1948–1950).

== Traditions ==
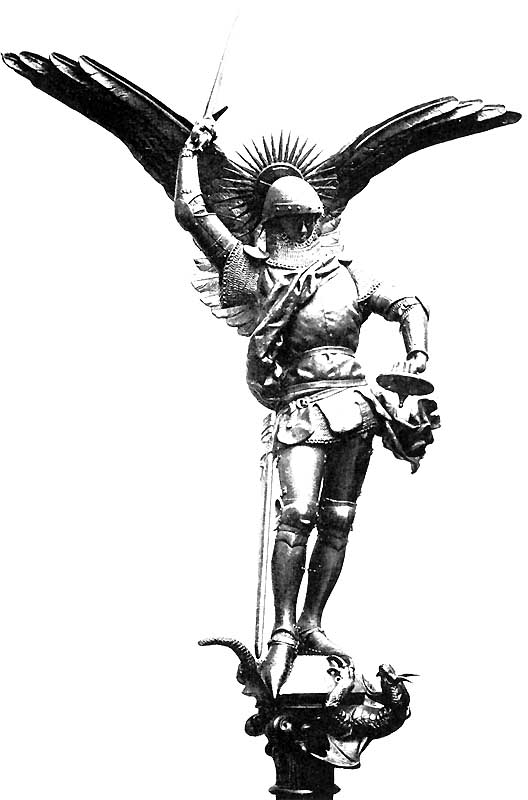
The Archangel Michael featured in Mont Saint-Michel and the Insignia of the 9th Parachute Chasseur Regiment.

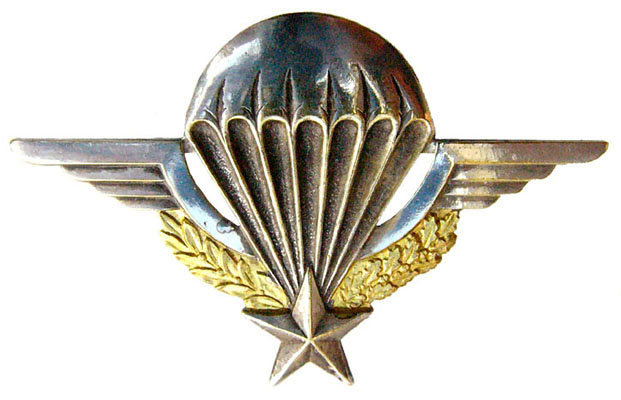
French Parachute Brevet.

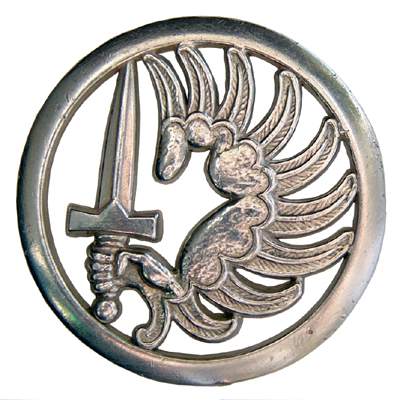
Circled Winged Armed Dextrochere of French metropolitan Paratroopers.

=== Insignias ===
The insignia of the French metropolitan Paratroopers represents a closed "winged armed dextrochere", meaning a "right winged arm" armed with a sword pointing upwards. The Insignia makes reference to the Patron of Paratroopers. In fact, the Insignia represents "the right Arm of Saint Michael", the Archangel which according to Liturgy is the "Armed Arm of God". This Insignia is the symbol of righteous combat and fidelity to superior missions.

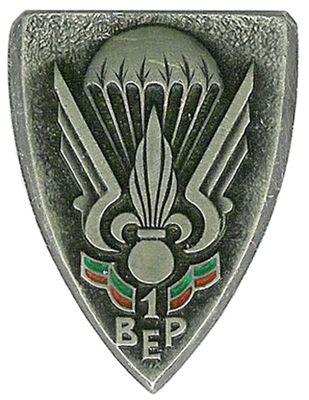
1^{er} B.E.P Insignia

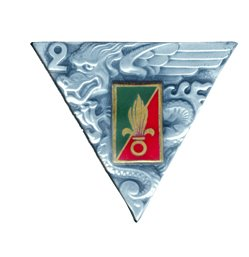
2^{e} B.E.P and 2^{e} R.E.P Insignia

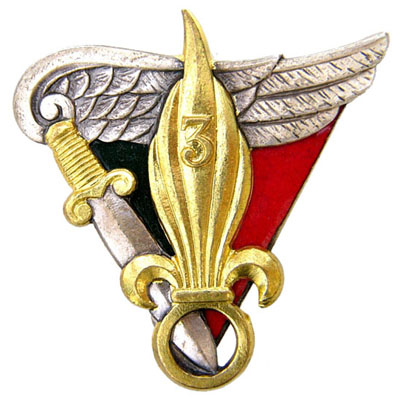
3^{e} B.E.P then 3^{e} R.E.P Insignia

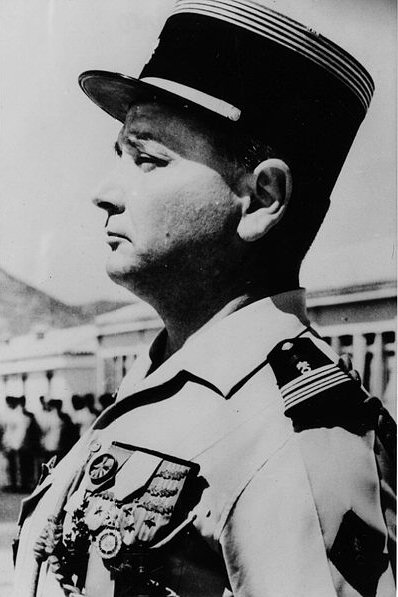
Colonel Paul Marie Félix Jacques René Arnaud de Foïard (1921–2005)

=== Decorations ===
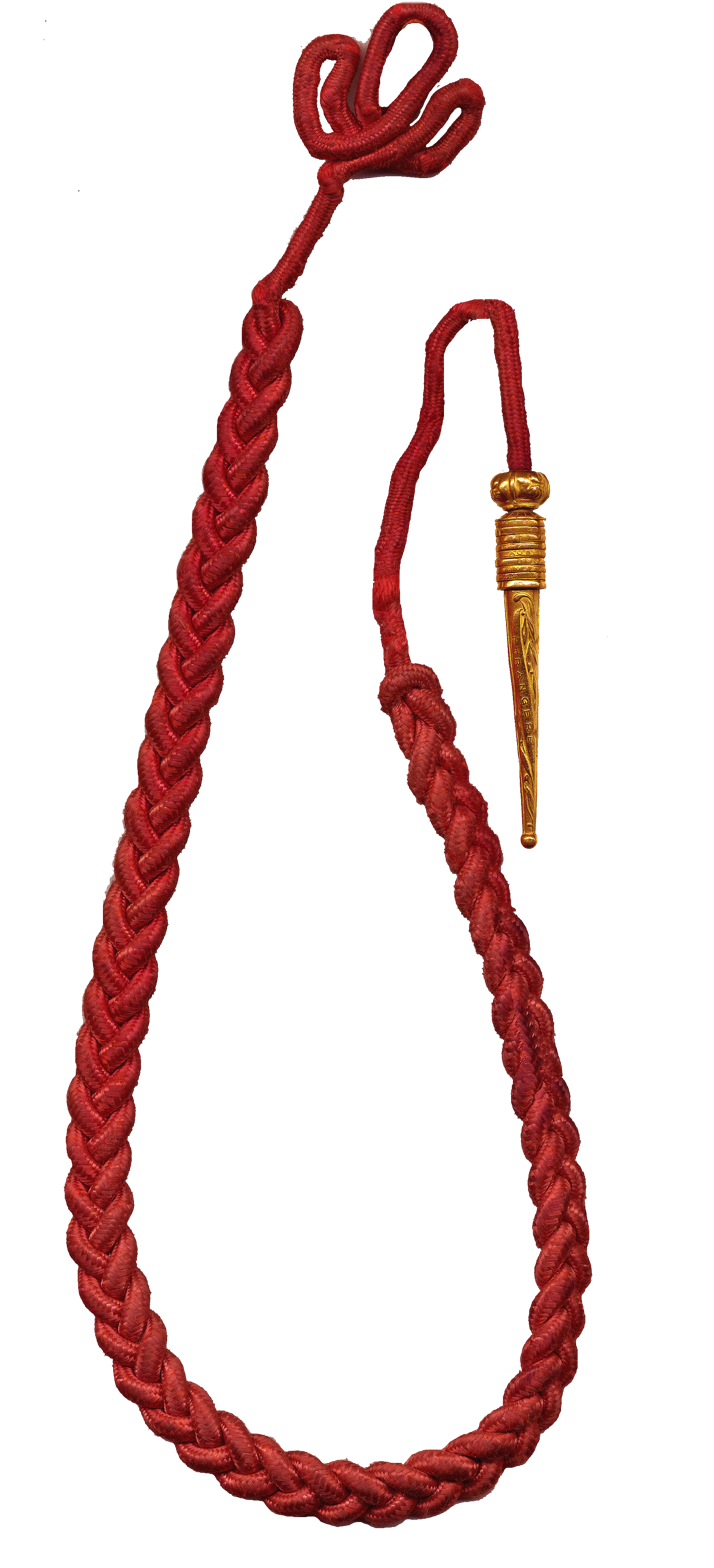
6 citations with Fourragère ruban colors of the Legion of Honor

== Battalion Commanders ==
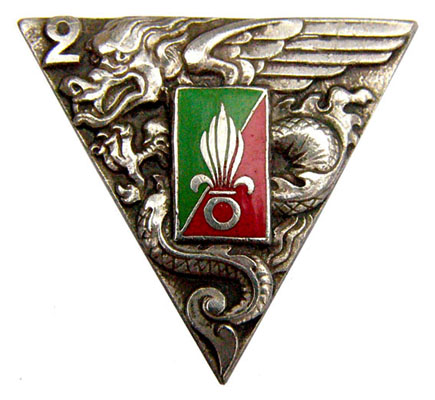
2^{e} Bataillon Etranger de Parachutistes 2^{e} BEP Tenure ( 1948 - 1955 )

- 1948 : captain Solnon
- 1950 : captain Dussert
- 1950 : chef d'escadrons commandant Barthélémy Rémy Raffali (* †)
- 1952 : chef de bataillon Bloch
- 1953 : captain Merglen
- 1953 : chef de bataillon Liesenfelt
- 1954 : captain Vial
- 1954 : chef de bataillon Masselot

== Notable Officers and Legionnaires ==
- Paul Arnaud de Foïard
- Rémy Raffalli
- Hélie de Saint Marc

== See also ==
- Major (France)
- French Foreign Legion Music Band (MLE)
