= August von Kageneck =

German tank commander and writer in French

August van Kageneck
- Born: 31 August 1922; Lieser, Rhineland
- Died: December 13, 2004 (aged 82); Bad Oldesloe, Lübeck
- Military career
- Allegiance: Nazi Germany
- Service years: 1939–1945
- Conflicts: World War II

August Graf von Kageneck (1922–2004) was a German tank commander in the armored forces, writer and a journalist.

He served in the German Wehrmacht in World War II as a tank commander, before being wounded in 1942 and evacuated back to Germany.

His life included time as a tank commander during WWII in the Eastern Front. After the war he became a journalist and author of several books. He was instrumental in the postwar reconciliation between France and Germany.

== Early life ==
August von Kageneck was born in the Rhineland, Germany on 31 August 1922; and was the fifth son born into an aristocratic family living midway between Treves and Koblenz on the banks of the Moselle. His father had commanded a brigade of cuirassiers during the First World War, had previously been a military attaché to Vienna and aide-de-camp to Emperor Wilhelm II.

August spent his childhood in Wittlich, the site of a French garrison, until 1930.

== Life during Hitler's reign ==
August joined the Hitler Youth, as if he were joining the scouts. His secondary education took place at the Aloisiuskolleg, a Jesuit school in Bad Godensberg.

=== Enlistment and intervention to the Second World War ===
In April 1939 he enlisted in the 17th Cavalry Regiment in Bamberg. On 1 January 1941 he joined the armoured forces academy in Krampnitz near Potsdam as an officer cadet. He left on 1 May 1941 as a second lieutenant and joined the reconnaissance battalion of the 9th Armoured Division composed of Austrians. On 23 June 1941, at age 18, he entered Russia at the head of a group of tanks.

In December 1944, he was finally assigned to the Western Front and finished serving in the war, fighting against the Americans, in the heart of the Harz, in the ranks of the reconnaissance battalion of the famous Panzerlehr-Division. He managed to escape captivity and joined his parents, in Rhineland, once again under French occupation.

== Later life and death ==
August started a career in journalism after WWII. In 1948, he worked on a local newspaper, published in Bad Kreuznach. In 1950, he was a reporter for Hamburg's daily paper. From then until 1955, the year he moved to Paris, he carried out regular reporting in Africa for German television. For 16 years, he went on to be the correspondent in France for the national German daily Die Welt as well as for Germany's official television stations.

He died on 13 December 2004, in Bad Oldesloe in the region of Lübeck following a long illness.

== Legacy ==
In 1973, he was interviewed for the documentary series "Les Grandes Batailles" (fr). In 2009, he was posthumously introduced as a miscellaneous character in a documentary series called Apocalypse: The Second World War.
