= Pierre Darmuzai =

French military general

- Born: 4 January 1915; Bayonne, France
- Died: 18 February 1996 (aged 81); Chalon-sur-Saône, France
- Military career
- Allegiance: France
- Branch: French Army; Foreign Legion
- Service years: 1933–1972
- Rank: Général
- Commands: 1st Foreign Parachute Battalion; 1^{er} BEP; 3rd Foreign Parachute Battalion; 3^{e} BEP; 3rd Foreign Parachute Regiment; 3^{e} REP; 2nd Foreign Parachute Regiment; 2^{e} REP; Technical Inspection of the Foreign Legion
- Conflicts: World War II; Indochina War; Algerian War

Pierre Georges Fernand Darmuzai (4 January 1915 – 18 February 1996) was a French Général who served an entire career in the formation of the Parachute Battalions and Regiments BEPs and REPs of the Foreign Legion.

== Military career ==
In 1928, he entered the Troop Enfant School (French: école des enfants de troupes), then another troop enfant school, on October 1, 1932. He subscribed accordingly an engagement at the title of the metropolis infantry to serve the 57th Infantry Regiment (French: 57^{e} Régiment d'Infanterie), on January 4, 1933. Following his instruction, he joined the 2nd company on August 14. He was nominated to the rank of Sergent (Sergeant) on April 1, 1936. He was sent to the infantry and tank school at Saint-Maixent on October 1, 1937, in quality of an active officer. He was nominated to the rank of Sous-lieutenant on September 15, 1938. At his sortie, he was at the disposition of the mobilizing center of Bourges, then integrated into the particular general staff headquarters of the infantry, on October 1, 1938. On May 1, 1939, he passed to the support company of the 71st Infantry Regiment (French: 57^{e} Régiment d'Infanterie) in quality of a section chief. During the declaration of war, he was in Ardennes with his unit, then in Sarre in December. He was detached to the infantry center of instruction, on February 1, 1940, and served on the Swiss frontier in May 1940 then in the Aisne. His regiment became the 71st Alpine Infantry Regiment (French: 71^{e} Régiment d'Infanterie Alpine), and passed to the 3rd company on May 10, 1940. Wounded by a bullet in the right thigh at Venizelle, on June 7, 1940, he was evacuated. He was promoted to the rank of lieutenant on June 25. At his sortie, he was integrated in the armistice army at the 26th Infantry Regiment (French: 26^{e} Régiment d'Infanterie), on August 15, 1941, the passed to the 10th company of the 3rd battalion of the 26th Infantry Regiment.

In reason of the dissolution of the armistice army, he was placed on leave on November 26, 1942.

He joined then the FFL by Spain on July 31, 1943. Confined in an internment at Irun then at Miranda, he was liberated after an intervention of the Franco-British Red Cross. He arrived to Casablanca on August 23. He transited by the depot of Bellys and the BMLE on September 26. Assigned to the 13th Demi-Brigade of the Foreign Legion 13^{e} DBLE at the corps of the 1st Free French Division 1^{e} DFL, at Nabeul in Tunisia, he served in the 3rd bureau as of October 30.

He embarked to Bizerte for the Italian Campaign with the general staff headquarters company. On April 8, 1944, he combat engaged at Carigliano. His unit became commandment company of the BC 13 on May 16, 1944.

He was promoted to captain on June 25, 1944, at a temporary title. His rank date would be confirmed in 1945. He embarked at Tarente to disembark at Provence at the corps of general staff headquarters of the 1^{e} BLE, on August 6, 1944. He combat engaged in the Campaign of France: Toulon, Lyon, Autun, Belfort, Alsace and Authion. He passed to the 3^{e} BLE on October 1 in quality of adjoint (French: assistant) to the Chef de bataillon. On November 1, he commanded the CP of the 3rd battalion.

Following the signature of the armistice, he benefitted of a leave of end of tour campaign on August 4, 1945, then was designated for reinforcement in the Far East (French: L'Extrême-Orient), he joined the 13th Demi-Brigade of the Foreign Legion 13^{e} DBLE. He disembarked in Saigon on March 10, 1946. He distinguished himself in February, in the sectors of the Mytho and Tra Vinh in Cochinchine and particularly in combat of February 18, 1947, on Rach Canxe. At the end of the tour, he disembarked at Marseille, to rejoice of his leave and was assigned in quality of a passenger to the DCRE and was administered by the regional administrative company, on June 7, 1947.

Right after, he pursued his services in AEF. On June 12, 1948, he was called to serve in the passing company of the DCRE at Sidi bel-Abbes before joining the 1st Foreign Parachute Battalion 1^{e} BEP at Philippeville on July 1. He was brevetted as a paratrooper on July 27.

Designated in quality as a recruiting officer, he passed from the DCRE to the PALE in Vincennes on July 30, 1948. Returned to the 1st Foreign Infantry Regiment 1^{e} REI at Siddi bel-Abbes in April 1949, he received the commandment of the 7th company of the 2nd battalion of the 1st Foreign Infantry Regiment 1^{e} REI, on April 16, 1949. In November, he commanded the 3rd Foreign Parachute Battalion 3^{e} BEP at Setif.

Designated for reinforcement in the Far East, he disembarked on March 4, 1951, at Saigon in an instruction role at the AD/GAHCF of the TAPI GAPN. On March 18, rejoined the commandment company of the 1st Foreign Parachute Battalion 1^{er} BEP. He led a preponderant role in the battle of Day, distinguishing himself particularly at Ngoc Lam on June 2, 1951, and at Yen Khoai on August 9, 1951. He participated from January 11 to 27, 1952 to all the clearing operations of the route colonial 6, led by a designated groupment and particularly on January 18, 1952, received the delicate mission to occupy Piton IV (Aa Trach Region).

He was repatriated sanitarian on June 26, 1952, and rejoined the CAR1 during his presence in the sanitary formations.

Assigned to the 18th Colonial Parachute Instruction Regiment (French: 18^{e} Régiment d'Instruction Parachutistes Coloniaux) at Bayonne, he joined his garrison on November 10, 1952. He occupied the functions of the general staff headquarters. He was promoted to the rank of Chef de bataillon (Commandant – Major) on October 1. He passed to the 41st Demi-Brigade at Philippeville on November 10, 1953, then was designated to command the 3^{e} BEP, on January 14, 1955. During this époque, he designed the insignia of the battalion.

On January 16, 1956, he commanded the Mounted Group of the Foreign Legion (French: Groupement Porté de La Légion Etrangere) at Agadir. This groupment merged with the 4th Foreign Infantry Regiment 4^{e} REI. He was assigned to the groupment of mounted companies 2 of the 4th Foreign Infantry Regiment 4^{e} REI on November 15 which he received the command. He passed then to the general staff headquarters of the Army Corps of Algiers in September 1957, where he was promoted to the rank of lieutenant-colonel on September 30, 1958.

Designated in quality as commandant in second of the 2nd Foreign Parachute Regiment 2^{e} REP, he joined his unit on February 2, 1959, unit where he received the regimental colors on April 1, 1960. He took part in numerous grand affairs which were sold by severe losses for the rebellion: in particular from November 5 to 11, 1957 in the Mezrana in Kabylie, from April 28 to May 1, 1958, in the Oued Okriss. He distinguished himself in combat : douar Ouillen and oued Bou Salah in the sector of Souk Ahras, on March 1 and 2, 1959 in douar Ouleb Dieb in the sector de la Calle, on April 11, 1959, and at Sidi Salem in the sector of Bône on June 24, 1959, the throughout the course of operations « Rubis » from September 15 to October 20, 1959; « Saphir » on October 20, 1959; « Turquoise » in November. On November 27 and 28, 1959, in the zone North Constantinois, at the Ouled Askeur and on March 13, 1960, in the douar Boutenache and more on August 5, 1960, during the operations of the Moyen Djendjen. Finally, on September 3 and 8, 1960 during operation « Alex » in the Aures in the zone South Constantinois, on December 2, 1960, at the djebel Chelia.

After the events of April 1961, he joined the Technical Inspection of the Foreign Legion in surnombre then was designated to serve in ZOM 3 at Diego Suarez at the general staff headquarters, a post which he joined on January 1, 1962.

On January 4, 1972, he was admitted to 2nd section of officer generals.

== Recognitions and Honors ==

- Grand Officier of the Légion d'Honneur
- Commandeur of the Légion d'Honneur
- Officier of the Légion d'Honneur
- Chevalier of the Légion d'Honneur
- Croix de guerre 1939–1945
- Médaille Coloniale with agrafe (Extrême-Orient)
- Médaille commémorative de la campagne d'Indochine
- Médaille commémorative des opérations de sécurité et de maintien de l'ordre en Afrique du Nord
- Croix Officer du Nichan Iftikar (Officer Crosses of the Nichan Iftikar)
- Chevalier de l'ordre du Vietnam (Knight of the Order of Vietnam)

Pierre was cited 11 times, 7 out of which are at the orders of the armed forces.

== See also ==
- Major (France)
- French Foreign Legion Music Band (MLE)
- Jacques Morin
- Saharan Méharistes Companies (méharistes sahariennes)
