= Rémy Raffalli =

French Army major

Barthélémy Rémy Raffalli
- Born: 16 March 1913; Nice, France
- Died: 10 September 1952 (aged 39); Saigon, State of Vietnam
- Military career
- Allegiance: France
- Branch: French Army; French Airborne
- Service years: 1933–1951
- Rank: Chef d'Escadrons
- Nickname: Rémy
- Units: 1st Algerian Saphis Regiment 3rd Moroccan Spahis Regiment; 5th Moroccan Tirailluers Regiment; 1st Foreign Regiment; 1^{er} RE; 3rd Foreign Parachute Battalion; 3^{ème} BEP; 1st Foreign Parachute Battalion; 1^{er} BEP 2nd Foreign Parachute Battalion; 2^{ème} BEP
- Commands: 2nd Foreign Parachute Battalion 2^{ème} BEP
- Conflicts: World War II; Italian Campaign; First Indochina War

Barthélémy "Rémy" Raffalli (16 March 1913 – 10 September 1952) was a French Army major who fought in World War II and the First Indochina War.

== Early life and pre-war service ==
He entered the Saint-Cyr Military School on 1 October 1933 as part of the King Albert I promotion and graduated in 1935. Raffalli then chose to enter the cavalry of the French Army and studied at the Armoured Cavalry Branch Training School in Saumur. In 1936 he was posted to the 1st Regiment of Spahis in Algeria, which he joined at Médéa, and then the 3rd Moroccan Regiment of Spahis.

== World War II service ==
Raffalli joined the French Expeditionary Corps in Italy in 1943 and served with distinction. On 17 March 1944, he was seriously wounded while leading a squadron of the 5th Moroccan Spahis Regiment.

== Post War service and death ==
Raffalli earned his parachute badge in September 1949. After a short tour with the 3rd Foreign Parachute Battalion 3^{ème} BEP and 1st Foreign Parachute Battalion 1^{et} BEP, he took command of the 2nd Foreign Parachute Battalion 2^{ème}BEP on 12 September 1950 in Hanoi, Vietnam. He was promoted to Chef d'Escadrons on 1 July 1951 and led the battalion during the Battle of Nghia Lo in October 1951. He was fatally wounded on 1 September 1952 while leading his battalion; he died on 10 September 1952 in Saigon.

== Honors and awards ==
=== Decorations ===
- Légion d'honneur
  - Knight (1944)
  - Officer (1951)
  - Commander (1951)
- Croix de guerre 1939-1945 with one bronze star
- Croix de guerre des Théatres d'Opérations Exterieures with one bronze star

== Legacy ==
=== Posthumous homages ===
==== Camp Raffalli ====
Camp Raffalli, the headquarters of the 2nd Foreign Parachute Regiment (2^{ème} REP) is named in his memory.

==== Promotion class « Chef d'Escadrons Raffalli » École militaire interarmes ESM ====
The 183rd promotion of the École spéciale militaire de Saint-Cyr chose the promotion Chef d'Escadrons Raffalli. The song of the promotion recalls the arms celebration of Chef d'Escadrons Raffalli .

== See also ==
- Major (France)
- French Foreign Legion Music Band (MLE)
