= Pierre Jeanpierre =

French Army soldier (1912–1958)

Pierre Paul Jeanpierre
- Born: 14 March 1912; Belfort, France
- Died: 29 May 1958 (aged 46); Guelma, French Algeria
- Military career
- Allegiance: France
- Branch: French Infantry Foreign Infantry Foreign Airborne
- Service years: 1930–1958
- Rank: Lieutenant colonel
- Nicknames: Soleil (radio callsign); Jardin (resistance alias)
- Commands: 1 BEP (1948–1955); 1 REP (1955–1956), (1957–1958) †
- Conflicts: World War II Syria–Lebanon Campaign; First Indochina War; Suez Crisis; Algerian War Battle of Boukerker Battle of Algiers (1956-1957) Battle of the borders (Algerian war) †
- Awards: Grand Officer of the Légion d'honneur Croix de Guerre 1939–1945; Croix de guerre des TOE; Cross for Military Valour; Resistance Medal w/Rosette; Colonial Medal; Indochina Campaign commemorative medal North Africa Security and Order Operations Commemorative Medal

Pierre Paul Jeanpierre (French pronunciation: [pjɛʁ pɔl ʒɑ̃pjɛʁ]; 14 March 1912 – 29 May 1958) was a soldier in the French Army, a French Resistance fighter and senior officer of the French Foreign Legion.

He served in the French Army and fought during World War II, the First Indochina War, the Suez Crisis and the Algerian War, where he was killed in action. Apart from a short time spent in the French resistance and as a prisoner during World War II, he served with the Foreign Legion from 1936 onwards. Jeanpierre commanded the 1st Foreign Parachute Battalion, expanded into the 1st Foreign Parachute Regiment (1 REP) until his death during the Algerian War.

== Early life ==
He was born in 1912 at Belfort. His father was an active duty career officer and captain in the 42nd Infantry Regiment, killed in 1916 at the Marne, without seeing his family since the outbreak of World War I in August 1914. He was raised by his mother and enlisted in the infantry at the age of 18 years.

== Military career ==
=== Prior to World War II ===
He joined the 131st Infantry Regiment as a soldier in 1930. He graduated second from the Infantry and Tank School of Saint-Maixent-l'École as a Second lieutenant on 1 October 1936. His graduation ranking allowed him to choose the Foreign Legion's 1st Foreign Regiment, becoming a Lieutenant on 1 October 1938.

=== World War II ===
==== Syria–Lebanon Campaign ====
During World War II, he served in the 6th Foreign Infantry Regiment, deployed in 1939 to the French Levant. Following combat in the Syria–Lebanon Campaign, he refused to join the Free French Forces.

==== Resistance and deportation ====
He joined the French Resistance under the alias "Jardin", recruiting and arming over 60 volunteers. He was arrested at Orléans on 19 January 1944 and was deported as a prisoner of war to the Mauthausen-Gusen concentration camp. He was one of only two survivors out of 45 in his group when the camp was liberated by the Allies on 5 May 1945.

==== Post WWII ====
After recovering from captivity, he was promoted to Captain and assigned to the French Foreign Legion recruitment center in Kehl. In July 1948, learning that a foreign parachute battalion would be formed in French Algeria, he volunteered, undergoing training at Philippeville where he was brevetted as a legion paratrooper. Three months later, the battalion was deployed to French Indochina.

=== Indochina ===
He sailed to Indochina as second-in-command to Pierre Segrétain in the 1st Foreign Parachute Battalion (1 BEP) in 1948. During the Battle of Route Coloniale 4, he and the battalion jumped into That Khe on 17 September 1950 to confront a much larger Viet Minh force. On 7 October 1 BEP and other units at That Khe were tasked with recapturing Dong Khé, but were ambushed by superior Viet Minh forces. Jeanpierre assumed leadership of the battalion after Segrétain was killed in action. By 7 October the French were trapped in the Coc Xa gorge, Jeanpierre divided the survivors into small groups and led 22 legionnaires back to That Khé, which had already been occupied by the Viet Minh and he and his men were captured.

Following his release from captivity in 1954, he rejoined the Legion in Mascara. 1 BEP had been annihilated again at the Battle of Dien Bien Phu and was reconstituted in a third formation on 19 May 1954. He took command of the unit on 1 November 1954. 1 BEP left Indochina on 8 February 1955. 1 BEP became the 1st Foreign Parachute Regiment (1 REP) in Algeria on 1 September 1955.

=== Suez Crisis ===
He was passed over for command of 1 REP on 6 February 1956, instead serving as second-in-command, this time to Colonel Albert Brothier. The regiment was put on alert on 1 August 1956 during the Suez Crisis. He embarked on 31 October, however, his views and reservations regarding this operation were well known.

=== Algeria ===
In March 1957 he assumed command of the 1 REP at the headquarters of the 10th Parachute Division commanded by Brigadier General Jacques Massu. Partnering operations with 1 REP, was the 9th Parachute Chasseur Regiment (9 RCP) commanded by Colonel Buchond. This new mission was complicated and included certain techniques of clandestine counter-insurgency operations, which several legion officers and legion sous-officiers were given authorization to complete. These techniques often included torture.

1 REP conducted security operations against the FLN during the battle of Algiers, during which Jeanpierre was badly wounded by a grenade launched by Saadi Yacef.

On 19 January 1958 1 REP deployed to eastern Algeria to engage ALN guerillas attacking oil convoys in the Battle of the borders. 1 REP used helicopters to conduct air assaults against the ALN, with Jeanpierre frequently coordinating operations from his Alouette command helicopter. Jeanpierre's radio code name was " Soleil" (The Sun).

On 29 May 1958 while supervising operations, his helicopter was hit by ALN fire and crashed killing him. Shortly after, Captain Ysquierdo reported on the radio the following message: "Soleil est mort" meaning "the Sun (Jeanpierre) is dead".

His funeral took place on 31 May at Guelma.

== Assessment ==
In the annex of the report on the battle of the frontiers, 9 RCP commander Colonel Buchond stated:

"the work of a single Commandant assisted by only one Captain and who only in one day mounts four para combat operations each time mounting at least a dozen of para combat companies, assists to three briefings in three different places, ensures the air sortie of eight para air assaults, conducts three to four hours of flying in Alouette, moves his command post three times... this company Commandant is placed the 28th of April at 10:00 by helicopter only 200 meters from the rebels, demolishes an entire section, brings back three automatic arms, is found engaged at 18:00, embarked in vehicles at night, hits the road for four hours, is found at midnight at 20 km from there, engaged in combat till the morning, repacked at 08:00, is engaged again at 12:00 noon time after four hours truck drives, flown by helicopter at 15:00 and is found 20 km from combat engaging two companies of rebels..."

The author André Maurois described Jeanpierre as:

"Un héros au cœur généreux et au caractère détestable, une assez bonne combinaison pour un chef " (a hero with a generous heart and a detestable character, a fairly good combination for a chief).

== Honours and awards ==
His awards included:

- Grand Officer of the Légion d'honneur
- Croix de guerre 1939-1945 (3 citations)
- Croix de guerre des Théatres d'Opérations Exterieures (5 citations)
- Croix de la Valeur Militaire (3 citations)
- Médaille de la Résistance avec rosette (Medal of the Resistance with Officer's Rosette)
- Médaille coloniale
- Médaille commémorative de la campagne d'Indochine
- Médaille commémorative des opérations de sécurité et de maintien de l'ordre en Afrique du Nord

== Legacy ==
- The garrison and camp of the 1 REP was named for him in 1959
- The grande place and chapel of Zéralda was named for him in 1959
- His portrait is displayed in La Salle d'Honneur in the French Foreign Legion Museum at Aubagne.
- The 146th promotion of the École spéciale militaire de Saint-Cyr chose the promotion Lieutenant-Colonel Jeanpierre
- The "stage" 001 (1960) of academy officers of reserve in the Cherchell military academy was named for him
- One of the Corniche prep classes of the Corniche Lyautey was named for him
- A promotion EOR Infantry of St Cyr Coetquidan (Fev.Mars.Avril.Mai 1972) was named for him
- A square in Nice was named for him in which a commemorative plaque has been erected.
- An avenue in Cagnes-sur-Mer and the Le Cannet was named for him
- A roundabout in Aix-en-Provence was named for him
- A road in Guelma, Algeria was named for him
- A road in Nevers was named for him
- A road in Belfort was named for him
