= Đông Khê, Cao Bằng =

Đông Khê Xã Đông Khê
- Commune
- Đông Khê commune
- Location within Vietnam
- Coordinates: 22°25′53″N 106°25′57″E
- Country: Vietnam
- Region: Northeast
- Province: Cao Bằng
- Time zone: UTC+7 (UTC + 7)

Đông Khê is a commune (xã) of Cao Bằng Province, Vietnam.

The township was the site of the Battle of Đông Khê.
