= 1st Foreign Parachute Battalion =

- 1^{er} Bataillon Etranger de Parachutistes
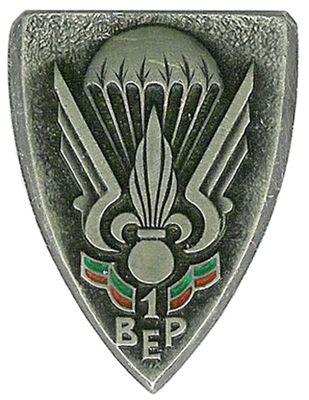
- Battalion Insignia
- Active: July 1, 1948 – November 17, 1950; March 1, 1951 – 1954; May 19, 1954 - September 1, 1955
- Country: France
- Branch: French Army
- Type: Paratrooper
- Role: Airborne force Close-quarters combat Counter-insurgency; Desert warfare Jungle warfare Raiding; Reconnaissance
- Size: Battalion
- Part of: Legion REP: 1^{er} BEP I Formation, 1948; 1^{er} BEP II Formation, 1951; 1^{er} BEP III Formation, 1954; 1^{er} REP, 1955
- Garrison/HQ: Khamisis
- Colors: Green and Red
- Anniversaries: Camerone Day
- Engagements: First Indochina War: Operation Castor; Battle of Dien Bien Phu

Commanders
- Notable commanders: Pierre Segretain Pierre Jeanpierre
- Abbreviation: 1^{er} B.E.P

The 1st Foreign Parachute Battalion (French: 1^{er} Bataillon Etranger de Parachutistes (1^{er} BEP)) was a parachute battalion of the Foreign Legion formed from the Parachute Company of the 3rd Foreign Infantry Regiment.

== History ==
1^{er} Bataillon Etranger de Parachutistes, 1^{er} BEP - I, II, III Formations -

The 1st Foreign Parachute Battalion, (1^{er} BEP, I formation) was created on July 1, 1948 at Khamisis, in Algeria. The 1^{er} BEP embarks in Indochina on November 12 and is engaged in combat operations in the Tonkin. On June 1, 1949, the Co. Para du 3^{ème} REI completed its count. On November 17, 1950; the 1^{er} BEP (1^{er} BEP, I Formation) jumps on That Khé and sacrifices itself in Coc Xa to protect the unfolding of the RC4 in a traditional Foreign Legion battlefield. Heading and leading tradition was 1er BEP battalion commander Chef de Corps du 1^{er} BEP, Commandant Pierre Segrétain. Segrétain was fatally wounded while leading the BEP during the Battle of Route Coloniale 4.

The battalion dissolved on December 31, 1950; is reconstituted on March 1, 1951 (1^{er} BEP, II formation) and is seen participating excessively in combat operations at Cho Ben, on the black river and at Annam. On November 21, 1953; the reconstituted 1^{er} BEP is parachuted on Dien Bien Phu. In this gigantic battle, the reconstituted (1^{er} BEP, II formation) 1^{er} BEP counts 575 killed and missing for the second time in a traditional Foreign Legion battlefield. Amongst the fatal casualties feature Lieutenants Dumont, Boisbouvier and de Stabenrath, killed in between April 1 and May 13 as well as Sergent-Chef Grimault, killed on March 30. Reconstituted for the third time (1^{er} BEP, III formation) on May 19, 1954, the 1^{er} BEP leaves Indochina on February 8, 1955. The 1^{er} BEP totals 5 citations at the orders of the armed forces and the fourragère of the colors of the Médaille militaire. The 1st Foreign Parachute Battalion (1^{er} BEP, III Formation) becomes the 1st Foreign Parachute Regiment (1^{er} REP) in Algeria on September 1, 1955.

The insignia of the 1st Foreign Paratrooper Battalion was created in 1948 by Commandant Segrétain, battalion commander Chef de Bataillon, CBA of the 1^{er} BEP.

== Traditions ==
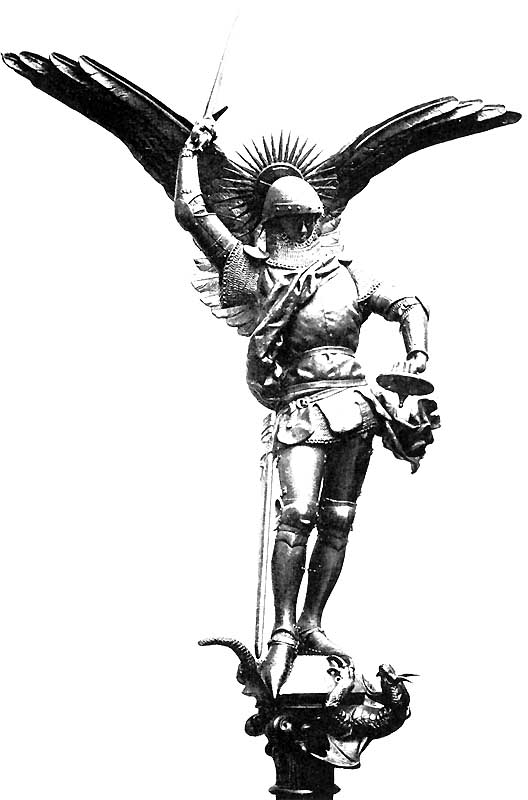
The Archangel Michael featured in Mont Saint-Michel and the Insignia of the 9th Parachute Chasseur Regiment.

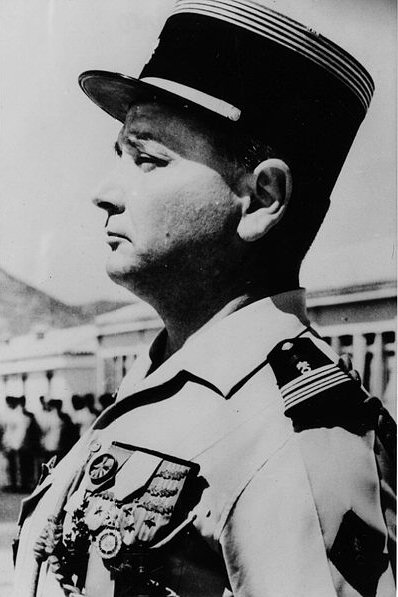
Colonel Paul Marie Félix Jacques René Arnaud de Foïard (1921-2005).

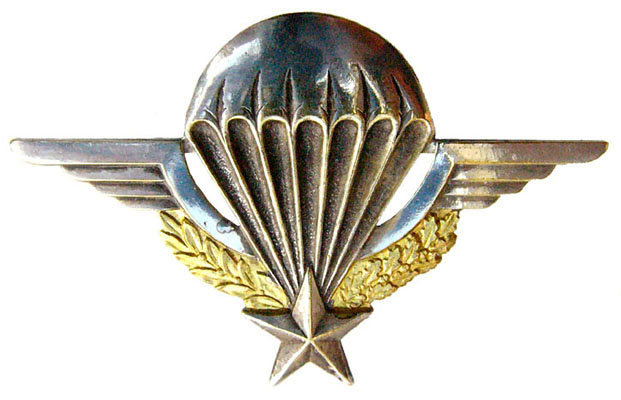
French and Foreign Legion Parachute Brevet.

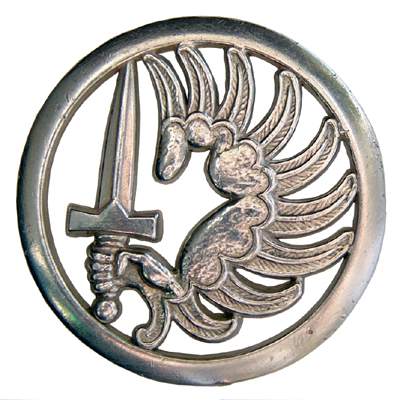
Circled Winged Armed Dextrochere of Foreign Legion Paratroopers

=== Insignias ===
The insignia of the Foreign Legion Paratroopers of France represents a closed "winged armed dextrochere", meaning a "right winged arm" armed with a sword pointing upwards. The Insignia makes reference to the Patron of Paratroopers. In fact, the Insignia represents "the right Arm of Saint Michael", the Archangel which according to Liturgy is the "Armed Arm of God". This Insignia is the symbol of righteous combat and fidelity to superior missions.

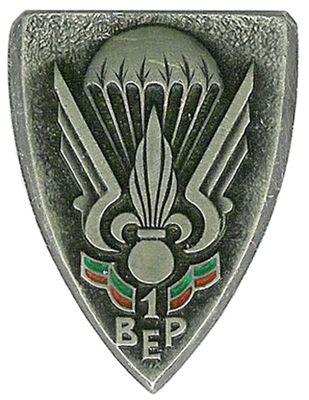
1^{er} BEP

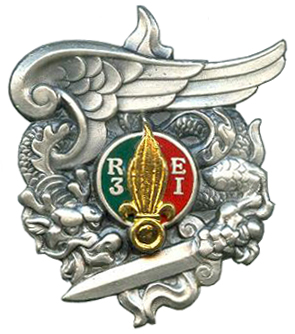
Co. Para du 3^{e} REI in the 1^{er} REP and 1^{er} BEP

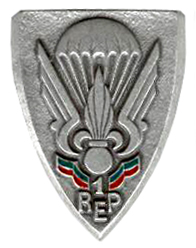
1^{er} REP

== Battalion Song ==
Contre Les Viets

http://foreignlegion.info/songs/contre-les-viets/

=== Decorations ===
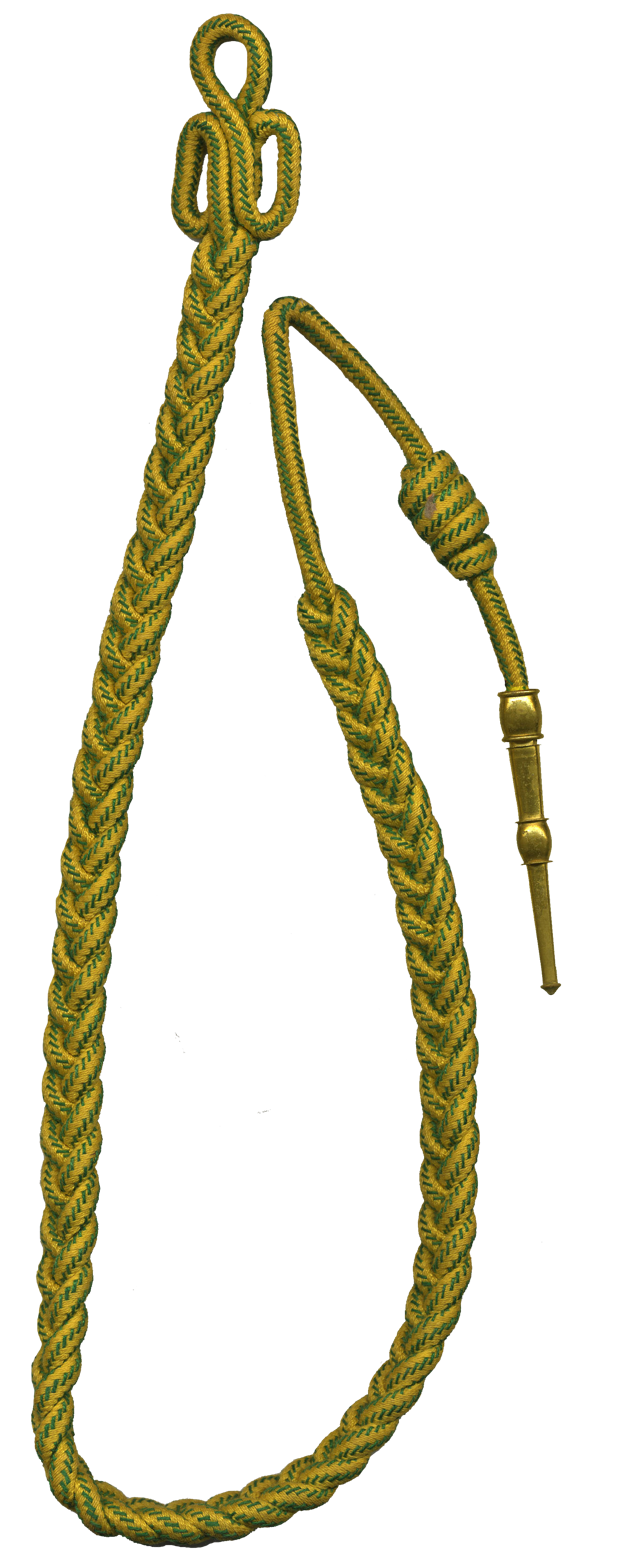
5 citations with Fourragère with ruban colors of Médaille militaire

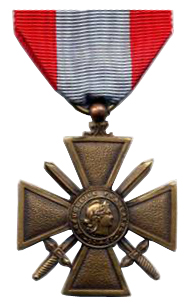
Croix de guerre des théâtres d'opérations extérieures

== Battalion commanders ==
=== 1st Foreign Parachute Battalion, 1^{er} BEP (1948–1955 ) - I, II, III Formations - ===
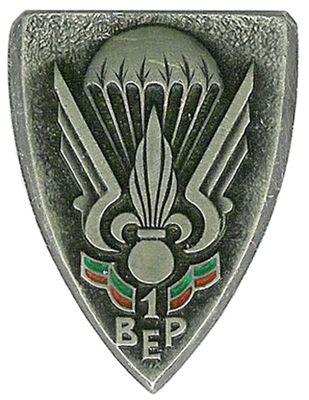
1^{er} Bataillon Etranger de Parachutistes Tenure ( 1948–1955 )

- 1948–1950: chef de bataillon Pierre Segrétain(* †) (I Formation, (1^{er} BEP)
  - Acting second-in-command Adjoint: Pierre Paul Jeanpierre
- 1950– 1950: captain Raffalli
- 1950–1950: captain Vieules
- 1951–1952: chef de bataillon Pierre Darmuzai (II Formation, 1er BEP)
- 1952–1953: chef de bataillon Brothier
- 1953–1954: chef de bataillon Maurice Guiraud
- 1954–1954: captain Chalony (par intérim)
- 1954–1954: captain Hélie Denoix de Saint-Marc (by interim)
- 1954–1954: captain Germain
- November 1, 1954: chef de bataillon Pierre Paul Jeanpierre (II Formation, 1^{er} BEP)
- May 19, 1954 – September 1, 1955: chef de bataillon Pierre Paul Jeanpierre (III Formation, 1^{er} BEP)

== Notable officers and legionnaires ==
- Rémy Raffalli
- Roger Faulques
