= Croix de guerre des théâtres d'opérations extérieures =

Croix de guerre des théâtres d'opérations extérieurs
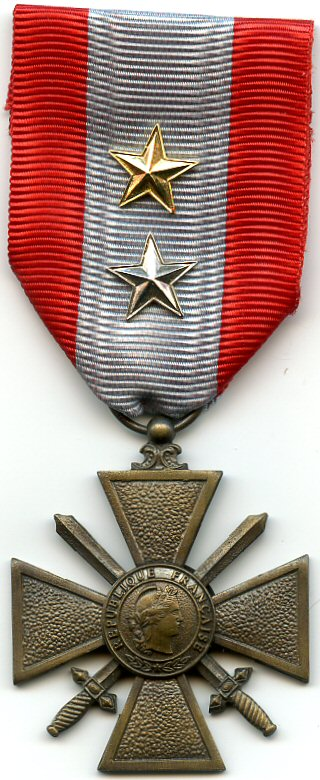
- War Cross for foreign operational theatres (obverse)
- Type: Medal
- Awarded for: Citations for courage during foreign operations
- Presented by: France
- Eligibility: Citizens of France & allied nations
- Status: Active
- Established: 30 April 1921
- Ribbon bar of the French croix de guerre des théâtres d'opérations extérieurs

Precedence
- Next (higher): Croix de guerre 1939-1945
- Next (lower): Cross for Military Valour

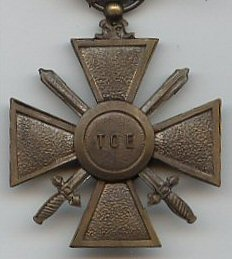
Reverse of the War Cross for foreign operational theatres

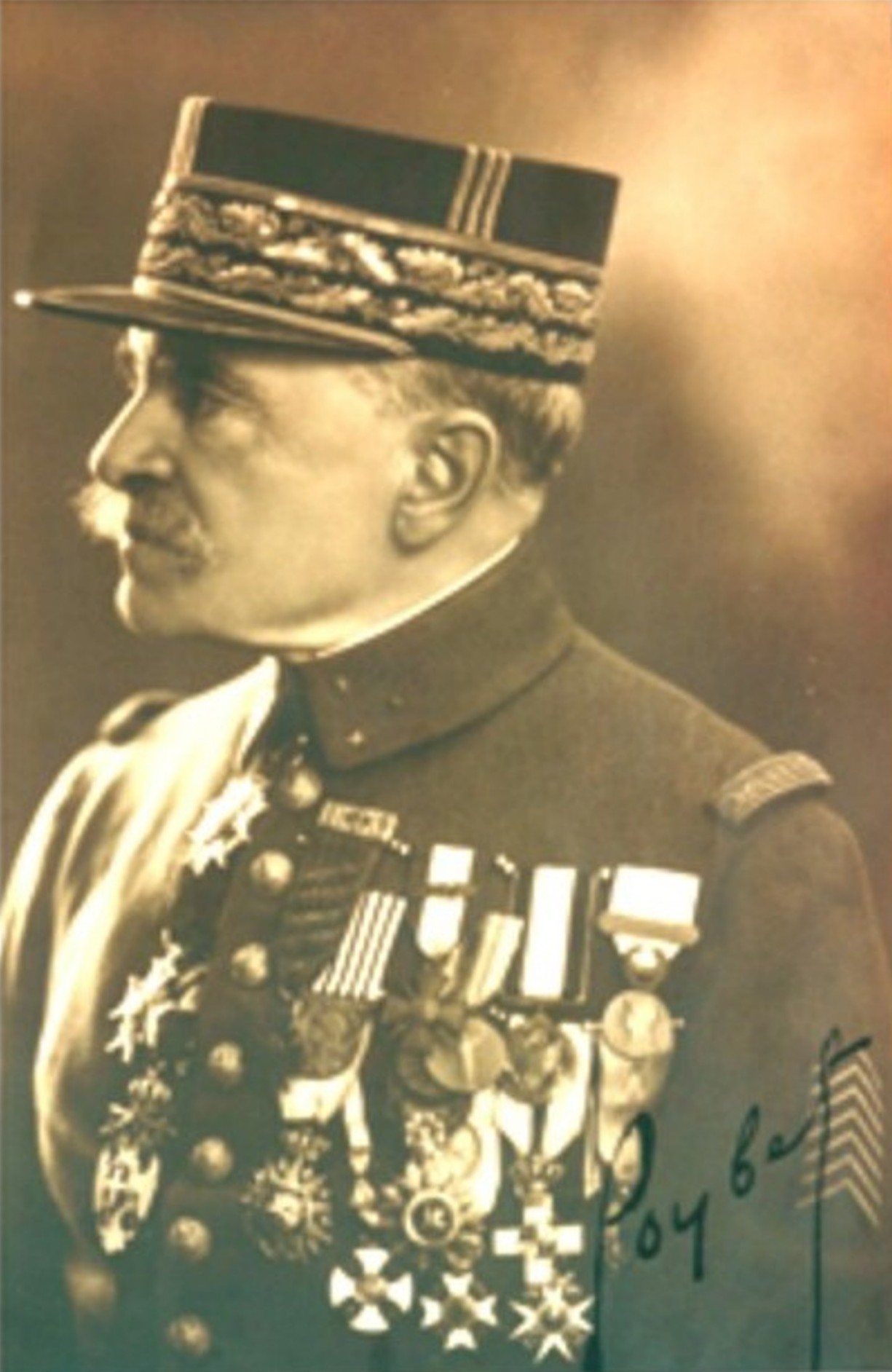
General Mariano Goybet, a recipient of the Croix de Guerre TOE

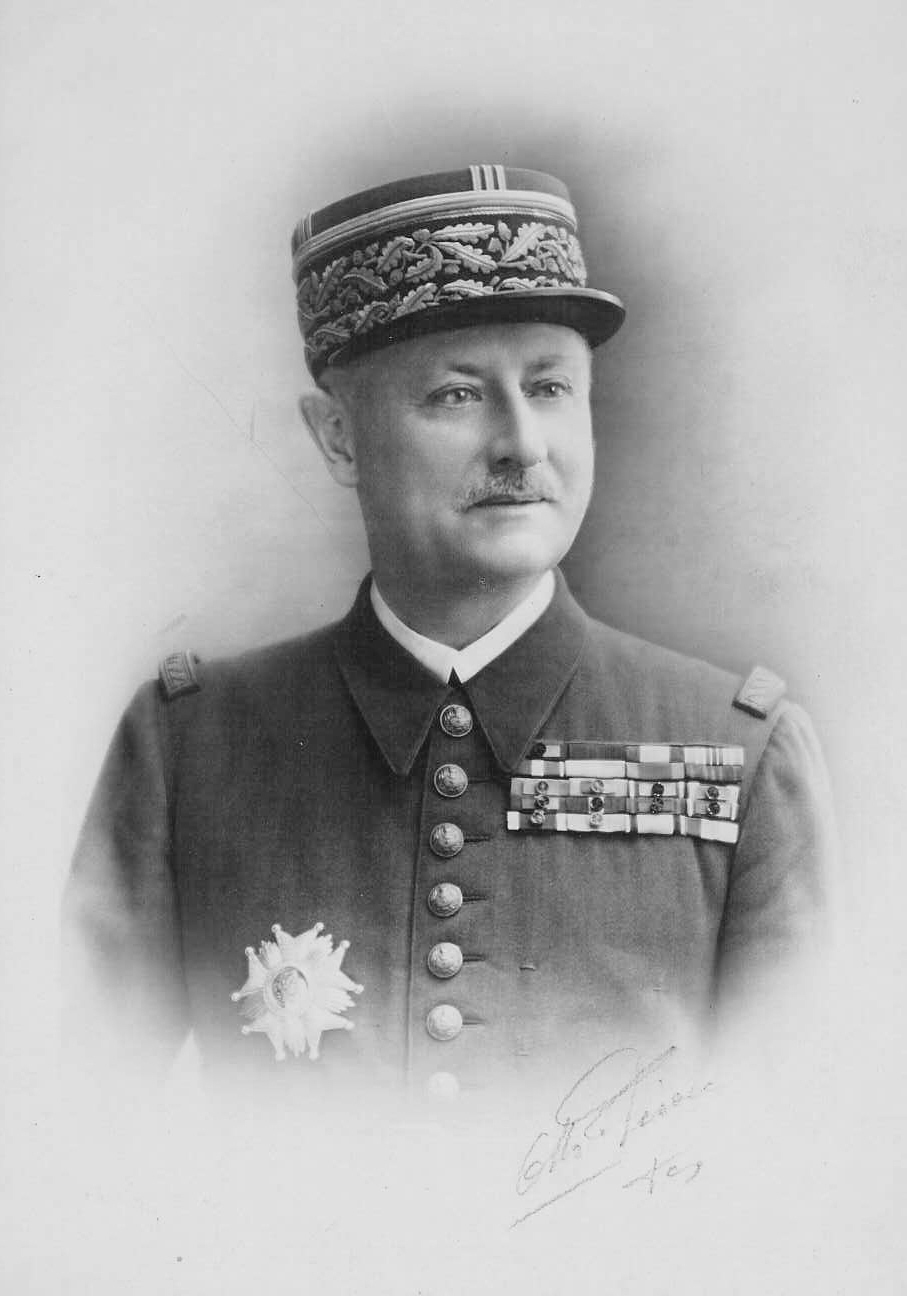
General Paul Azan, a recipient of the Croix de Guerre TOE

Croix de Guerre TOE in Spanish regimental heraldry (Rif War operations)

Coat of Arms of the 1st Tercio, Spanish Legion

Coat of Arms of the 2nd Tercio, Spanish Legion

Coat of Arms of the 3rd Tercio, Spanish Legion

The Croix de guerre des théâtres d'opérations extérieurs (French pronunciation: [kʁwa d(ə) ɡɛʁ de teɑtʁ dɔpeʁɑsjɔ̃ ɛksteʁjœʁ]; "War Cross for Foreign Operational Theatres"), also called the Croix de Guerre TOE for short, is a French military award denoting citations earned in combat in foreign countries. The Armistice of November 11, 1918 ended the war between France and Germany, but French soldiers continued fighting in theatres outside metropolitan France. Combat operations continued in Syria, Palestine, Constantinople, Morocco, French West Africa and French Equatorial Africa.

The Croix de Guerre TOE is the second of three versions of the Croix de Guerre created since the award's inception, (the others being distinct versions for World War I and World War II), and the only one considered active for new awards.

== History ==
A law was passed on April 30, 1921 establishing the new Croix de guerre for "Théâtres d'opérations extérieurs" (TOE). It was intended to commemorate the individual citations awarded during operations carried out since November 11, 1918 or that would occur in the future, for war service directly related to an expeditionary force used outside of the borders of France, otherwise, the statute of the Croix de guerre TOE was the same as that of the 1914 - 1918 Croix de guerre.

Following the combat operations of the immediate post World War 1 Era, the Croix de Guerre TOE was again awarded for actions in Indochina, Madagascar, Korea, and during the Suez Crisis.

After a hiatus of thirty-five years, it was again awarded for actions between January 17, 1991 and May 5, 1992 during the Gulf War (Order of Minister of Defence of 17 January 1991). It was also extended to military operations conducted in Kosovo in 1999.

== Statute ==
The award criteria for the Croix de Guerre TOE are substantially the same as those governing the Croix de Guerre 1914-1918, the citations for the entire armed forces are made by the Minister of Defense unless this authority has been specially delegated to the commanding general of the expeditionary forces.

The Croix de Guerre TOE is awarded to military personnel and civilians who have received an individual citation during war/combat operations on foreign soil. More precisely, it was awarded for citations earned in the following operational foreign theatres:

- The Levant in 1918 and 1919, in the East from 1918 to 1920 in Morocco in 1918;
- French Equatorial Africa (AEF) in 1919;
- French West Africa (FWA) from 1918 to 1921;
- Morocco (Rif War) of 1921-1926;
- Indochina in 1918-1922 and 1945–1954;
- for military missions in the Baltic countries (Estonia, Latvia, Lithuania), Upper Silesia, Poland, Czechoslovakia, Russia, the Caucasus, Siberia, Hungary and Romania;
- Madagascar in 1947;
- Korea from 1950 to 1953;
- The Middle East (Egypt from 30 October 1956 to 31 December 1956 and the Gulf War of 17 January 1991 to 5 May 1992);
- Federal Republic of Yugoslavia (Kosovo from 24 March 1999 to 21 June 1999).

For naval citations, their levels differ from the army as follows:

- army level = made by a vice-admiral commander in chief of a naval force or fleet;
- corps level = made by a vice-admiral commanding a naval squadron;
- divisional level = made by a rear-admiral commanding an independent naval division;
- brigade level = made by a rear-admiral or captain commanding a naval division;
- regimental level = made by the senior officer commanding a vessel or a naval force other than those mentioned above.

== Description ==
=== Cross ===
The Croix de guerre des théâtres d'opérations extérieures is a bronze 37 mm wide cross pattée, between the arms, two crossed swords pointing upward. It was designed by the sculptor Albert Bartholome. On the obverse in a circular medallion, the effigy of the Republic (Marianne) wearing a cap decorated with a laurel wreath, surrounded by a ring bearing the legend: "RÉPUBLIQUE FRANÇAISE". On the reverse, in the circular medallion the inscription: "THÉÂTRES D'OPÉRATIONS EXTÉRIEURS".

The cross is suspended by a ring through the suspension loop to a 38 mm wide grey silk moiré ribbon with 10 mm wide red edge stripes. The Croix de guerre TOE is worn on the left side of the chest and when in the presence of other medals of France, is located immediately after the Croix de guerre 1939 - 1945.

=== Ribbon devices ===
Citations (same as the Croix de guerre 1914-1918):

- A bronze star (etoile en bronze) for regimental or brigade level citations.
- A silver star (etoile en argent) for divisional level citations.
- A silver-gilt star (etoile en vermeil) for corps level citations.
- A bronze palm (palme en bronze) for army level citations.
- A silver palm (palme en argent) represents five bronze ones.

== Notable recipients (partial list) ==
- General Maxime Weygand
- Military nurse Geneviève de Galard
- General Philippe François Marie, comte de Hauteclocque
- General Jacques Émile Massu
- Major Hélie Denoix de Saint Marc
- Admiral Sir Manley Laurence Power (UK)
- General Jacques Pâris de Bollardière
- Colonel Jean Sassi
- General Mariano Francisco Julio Goybet
- General Edgard de Larminat
- Brigadier General Jean Raoux
- General Paul-Jean-Louis Azan
- General Marcel "Bruno" Bigeard
- General Alphonse Pierre Juin
- Lieutenant Colonel Prince Dimitri Zedguinidze-Amilakhvari
- Brigadier General Pierre Charles Albert Marie Langlais
- Admiral Georges Thierry d'Argenlieu
- Lieutenant Colonel Pierre Paul Jeanpierre
- Lieutenant Bernard de Lattre de Tassigny
- Major Barthélémy "Rémy" Raffali
- General Phạm Văn Phú
- Colonel Peter J. Ortiz, USMCR

== See also ==
- Croix de guerre 1914-1928 (France)
- Croix de guerre 1939-1945 (France)
- Croix de guerre (Belgium)
