= Battle of Route Coloniale 4 =

Battle in the First Indochina War (1950)

- Part of First Indochina War
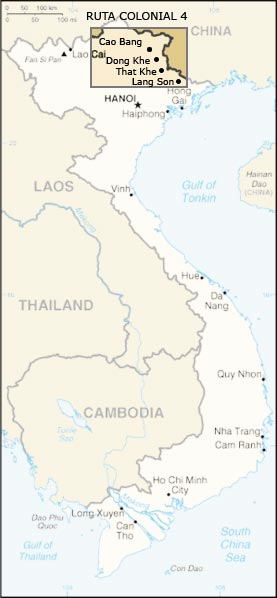
Date	30 September – 18 October 1950
Location	Northern Vietnam
Result	Việt Minh victory

Belligerents
French Union: France; French Indochina; State of Vietnam	Democratic Republic of Vietnam: (North Vietnam) Việt Minh

Commanders and leaders
Marcel Carpentier	Võ Nguyên Giáp; Hoàng Văn Thái; Đặng Văn Việt

Strength
(France) 6,000 regulars (South Vietnam) 2,000 regulars	30,000 regulars

Casualties and losses
(France) 4,800 killed and missing (South Vietnam) unknown	Western estimated: 9,000 casualties Việt Minh’s report: 1,000 killed and 1,550 wounded

The Battle of Route Coloniale 4, also called the Autumn-Winter Border Campaign (Chiến Dịch Biên Giới Thu Đông) by the Viet Minh, was a battle of the First Indochina War. It took place along Route Coloniale 4 (RC4, also known as Highway 4), a road used to supply the French military base at Cao Bằng. French military traffic along the road had previously been subject to an ongoing series of ambushes during 1947–1949.

The aim of Việt Minh in the 1950 Border Campaign was clearing the way to the Vietnam-China border for the supply flow from the newly formed People's Republic of China. In this campaign the Việt Minh also tried to test new tactics and gain new experiences in a large scale battle which the Việt Minh had not previously used.

The battle lasted from 30 September to 18 October 1950 and resulted in a French defeat when the Việt Minh got Chinese help. Several units of the French army, including some battalions of the French Foreign Legion, were devastated by the Việt Minh and essentially ceased to exist as fighting units.

== Background ==
During the French Indochina War (1946–1954), French forces attempted to re-establish colonial control of Vietnam, while the Vietnamese guerrilla forces, the communist Việt Minh, led by Ho Chi Minh fought for independence. Initially the Việt Minh were unsuccessful in dealing with the better -trained and -equipped French forces. Their situation improved in 1949 after the Chinese People's Liberation Army of Mao Zedong defeated the Nationalist army led by Chiang Kai-shek. This gave the Việt Minh, now almost completely made up of members of the Vietnam Workers Party, a safe haven for organization and training, as well as an initially sympathetic ally to provide them with arms and logistical support.

Võ Nguyên Giáp, the military leader of the Việt Minh, launched an offensive against the French in early 1950. From February to April, his operation Le Hong Phong I developed through the Red River Valley, largely giving the Việt Minh control of northwestern Tonkin, near the Chinese border. The area became a Việt Minh stronghold, except for the RC4 highway.

On 25 May, 2,500 Việt Minh troops overwhelmed the French fortress at Đông Khê, which lay at the strategic center of RC4, thus cutting the supply line between the French positions at Cao Bằng and Lạng Sơn. French paratroops retook Đông Khê on the evening of 27 May and a company of Legionnaires took charge of the fort.

Meanwhile, the Việt Minh regular army grew in size and experience. By the beginning of September, it comprised roughly 100,000 combatants in 70 battalions, with another 33 battalions of regional forces (40,000 men) as well as some 60,000 local support personnel. Giap then began harassing French positions along RC4 in northern Vietnam with mines and ambushes. The French responded by dismantling their small posts along the road and concentrating area forces in the fortified positions at Đông Khê and Cao Bằng. Giap planned to launch another assault on French positions in operation Le Hong Phong II.

On 16 September, five Việt Minh infantry and one heavy weapons battalions attacked Đông Khê. It was then garrisoned by some 300 French Foreign Legion troops comprising the 5th and 6th companies of the 2nd battalion of the 3rd Regiment (3rd REI). On 18 September, the fort was overrun after bitter fighting, and only 12 survivors escaped to the nearby post at Thất Khê. 140 Legionnaires had been taken prisoner, the remainder being killed or missing in action.

Thất Khê was quickly reinforced by the Foreign Legion's 1st Parachute Battalion (1st BEP), which parachuted in on 17 September. The 1st BEP waited at Thất Khê while a force of French colonial troops, the Moroccan 1st and 11th Tabors, and the 1st Marching Battalion of the 8th Moroccan Tirailleurs Regiment, assembled at Lạng Sơn. Designated Groupement Bayard the combined force comprised 3,500 men under the command of Colonel Le Page. The task force launched an intelligence raid, capturing prisoners who said a massive Việt Minh offensive was planned.

Meanwhile, General Marcel Carpentier, the commander in chief of French Indochina, decided to evacuate Cao Bằng. The commander of the Cao Bằng fort, Colonel Charton, was ordered to destroy his heavy equipment and motor transport and evacuate towards Đông Khê. The plan was that Groupement Bayard would fight its way north from Thất Khê and retake Đông Khê, holding it long enough to link up with the Cao Bằng group. This group comprised 2,600 troops and 500 civilians, the latter mostly pro-French Thái partisans and their families.

== Battle of RC4 ==
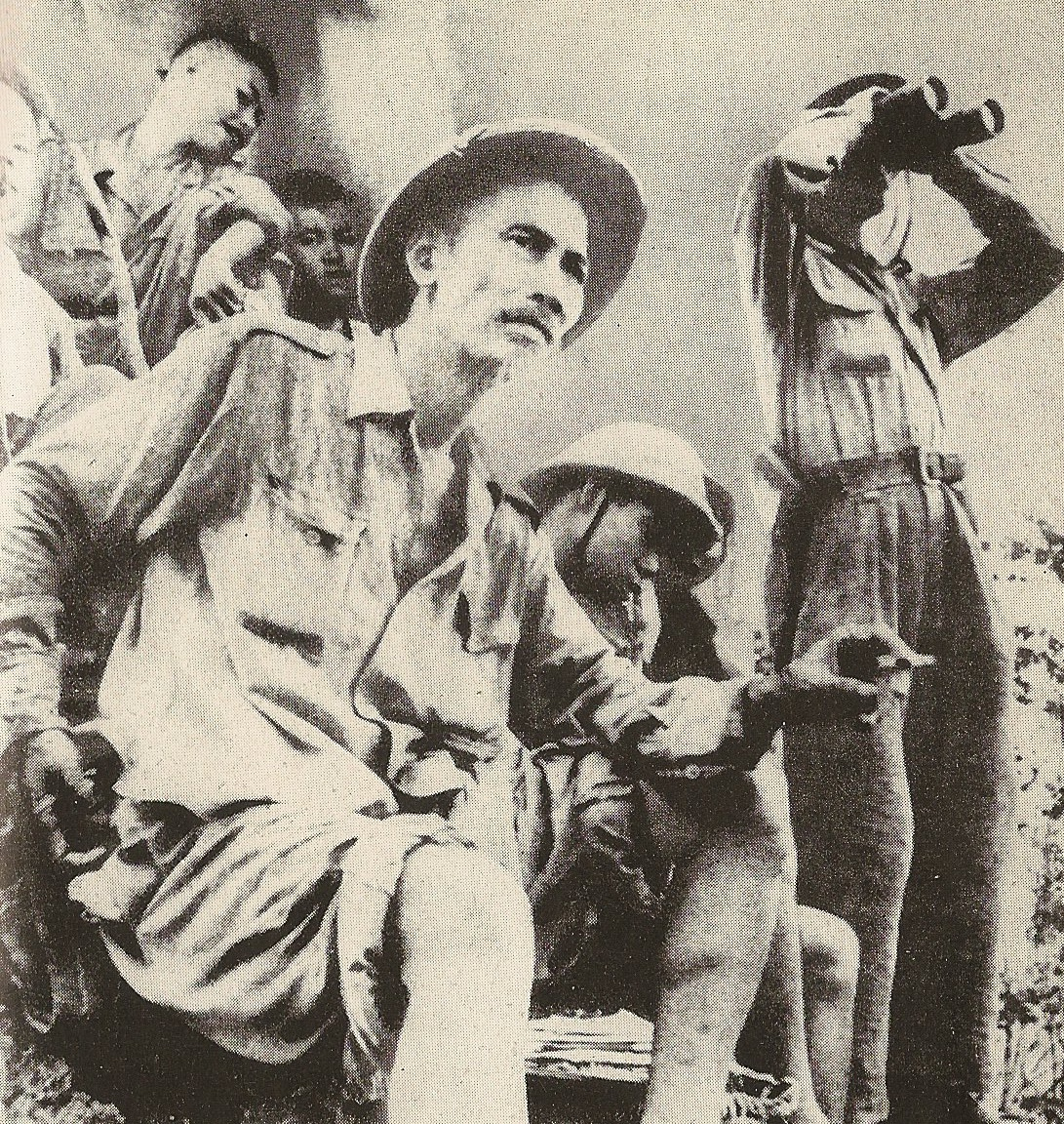
Ho Chi Minh observing the battle at Dong Khe

On 30 September, Groupement Bayard set out from Thất Khê, led by the 1 BEP. However, Giap had concentrated ten battalions around Đông Khê, reinforced by a complete artillery regiment, together with the remaining forces from Le Hong Phong I. The Việt Minh rebuffed the French forces, which were forced to pull back and wait for air support. Le Page renewed the attack on 2 October, pushing west to bypass Đông Khê as Việt Minh numbers were overwhelming.

Meanwhile, Colonel Charton's group, led by the 3rd Battalion, 3rd REI, left Cao Bằng on 1 October; contrary to orders he took with him his heavy equipment. The group's movement down RC4 was slowed by Việt Minh ambushes. After bitter fighting, they finally abandoned their heavy equipment and linked up with Groupement Bayard in the hills around Đông Khê on 5 October.

The French forces were driven into the Coc Xa gorge, where they were completely annihilated by 7 October. Martin Windrow notes that "Some 130 of the Legion parachute battalion out of the 500 that had jumped emerged from this breakthrough fight; they had only escaped by clambering down lianas shrouding a 75 ft cliff with their wounded tied on their backs".

In an attempt to support the embattled troops the 1st BEP Replacement Company (120 men) under Lieutenant Loth had been merged with 268 men from the 3rd Colonial Commando Parachute Battalion (3rd BCCP) under Captain Cazeaux and they were parachuted into Thất Khê on 8 October, but over the course of the next week were destroyed as well. Only 23 survivors of the 1st BEP, led by Captain Jeanpierre, managed to escape to French lines: it became the first French parachute battalion lost in combat, followed by the 3rd BCCP, of which only 14 soldiers returned unscathed.

== Aftermath ==
Of the more than 6,000 French soldiers and civilians involved in the operation, only 700 reached French lines. Lạng Sơn, the next French base to the south, was abandoned on 17 October and on 18 October the French command evacuated posts south of Lạng Sơn on RC4. Panic spread in French-controlled Hanoi and there was talk of an evacuation. Ultimately, however, General Jean de Lattre de Tassigny replaced Carpentier as commander in chief of French Indochina in late 1950 and restored French morale.

When the Border Campaign ended, the Việt Minh controlled a large part of the Vietnam-China border. Giáp had called the previous situation, in which the French controlled the Northern border, "fighting under siege". The "siege" started in 1945 and described how the French Army had encircled the Việt Minh. After the Border Campaign was won, the Việt Minh had greater access through to their socialist allies after lifting the "siege". "Fighting under siege" was a phrase used after the war to describe the Việt Minh's relationship with the Communist Bloc before this victory.

== See also ==
- History of Vietnam
