= 1st Mechanised Brigade (France) =

1^{re} Brigade Mécanisée
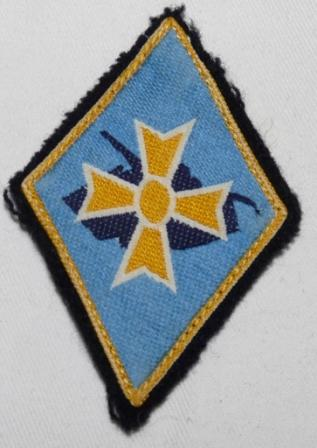
- Insignia of the 1st Mechanised Brigade
- Active: 1999 – 2015
- Country: France
- Branch: French Army
- Type: Mechanised
- Size: 4,000 including women
- Part of: CFAT
- Garrison/HQ: Châlons-en-Champagne
- Motto(s): Nomine et virtute prima ("First by name and valor")

Commanders
- Notable commanders: Général Éric Bellot des Minières

The 1st Mechanised Brigade (French: 1^{re} Brigade Mécanisée, 1^{re} BM) was one of the mechanized units of the Commandement des Forces Terrestres of the French Army. Created on 1 July 1999, as heir to the 1st Armored Division, the brigade was dissolved on 21 July 2015. Before the dissolution, formations reached 4000 men and women and the general staff headquarters of the brigade was garrisoned at Châlons-en-Champagne.

The 1st Division was recreated in 2016 within the cadre of the reorganization of the French Army.

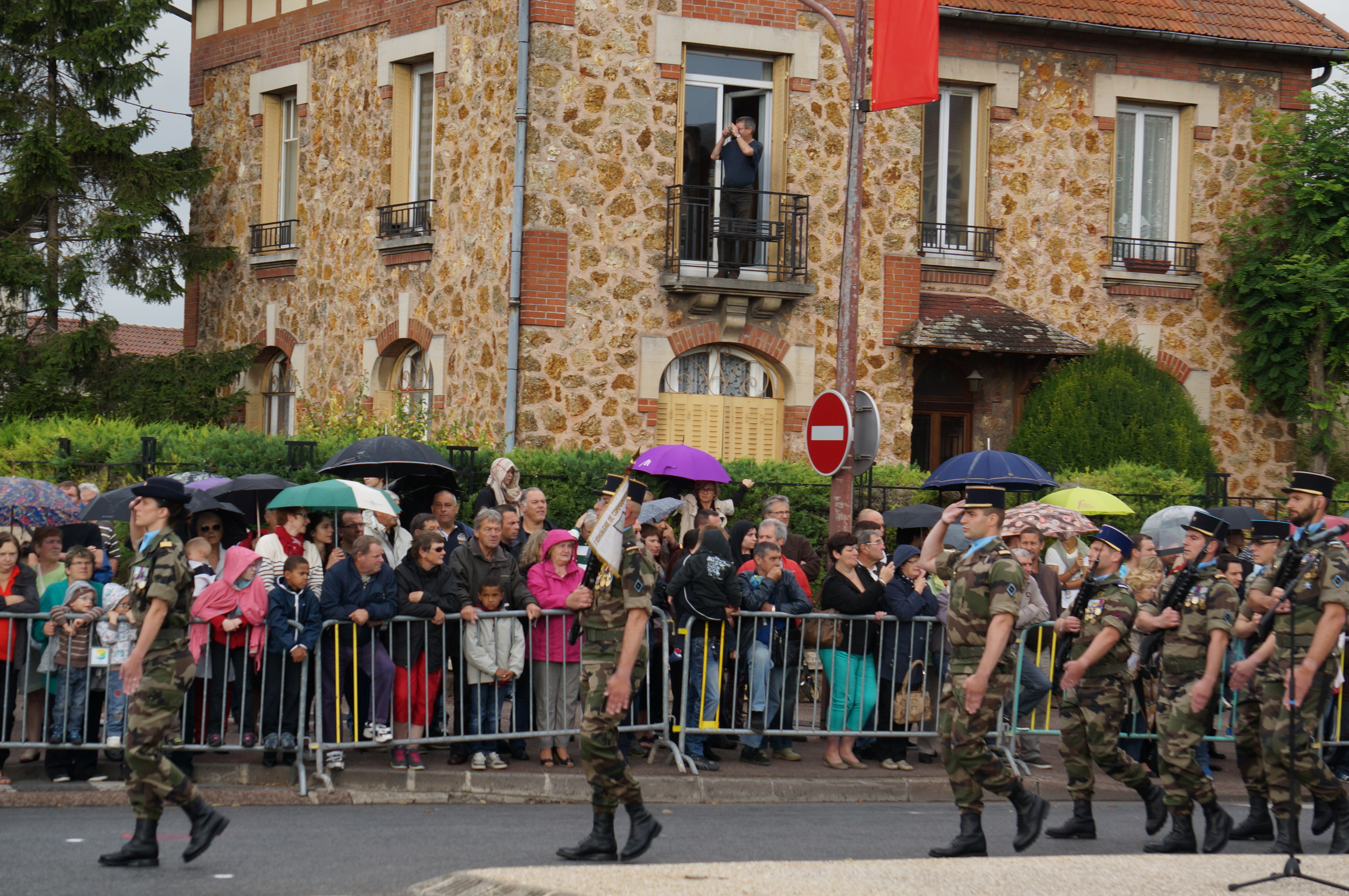
Command company marching in parade.

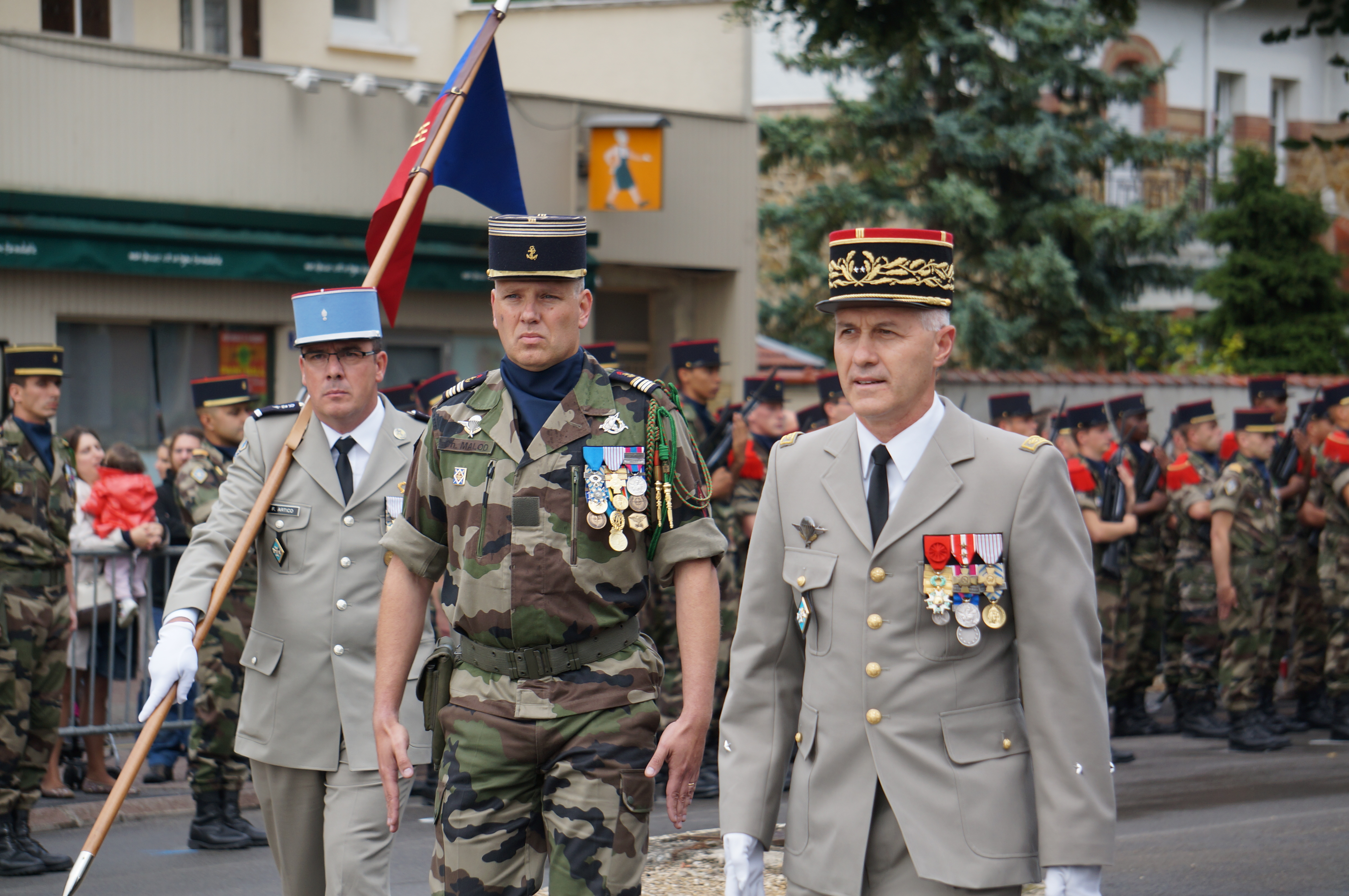
General Bruno Guibert commanding 1st Mechanised Brigade.

== Creation and different denominations ==
- 1 May 1943 : creation of the 1st Armored Division 1^{re} DB from the Light Mechanized Brigade (BLM);
- 31 March 1946 : dissolution of the 1^{e} DB
- 1948 : the 1st Division was recreated;
- 1 July 1999 : created of the 1st Mechanized Brigade 1^{re}BM which inherited the traditions of the 1st Armored Division;
- 21 July 2015 : dissolution of the 1st Mechanized Brigade and the 1st commandment and transmission company

== Motto ==
The motto, Nomine et Virtute Prima literary means "First by name and valor". The choice of the insignia, the cross of Saint Louis by général Jean Touzet du Vigier, comes from the place of formation of the unit, Tunisia, where King Louis IX of France came to rest in 1270.

== History ==
The 1st Armoured Division was dissolved with the reorganisation of the French Army in 1999, and the dissolution of the French Forces in Germany FFA. The division's honours and traditions are carried on with the formation of the 1st Mechanised Brigade in Châlons-en-Champagne.

The brigade was strong with 4000 men and women. The brigade was engaged on the ensemble of exterior theatres operations with an average of 3500 soldiers on average per year: Afghanistan, Lebanon, Guyana, Kosovo, Ivory Coast, Tchad and Senegal.

The 1st Mechanised Brigade was dissolved on 21 July 2015.

== Organization ==
The brigade consists of at least 5000 personnel in 5 regiments and 3 brigade units.

- 1^{er} Régiment de Tirailleurs (1^{er} RTir) – infantry regiment in Epinal with VBCI
- 1^{er} Régiment d'Artillerie de Marine (1^{er} RAMa) – self-propelled marine artillery regiment in Laon with 12x CAESAR self-propelled howitzers and 16x 120mm RTF1 mortars
- 402^{e} Régiment d'artillerie (402^{e} RA) – artillery regiment in Châlons-en-Champagne
- 3^{e} Régiment du Génie (3^{e} RG) – engineer regiment in Charleville-Mézières
- 1^{re} Compagnie de Commandement et de Transmissions (1^{re} CCT) – command and signals company in Châlons-en-Champagne with VAB
- Escadron d'éclairage et d'investigation – brigade reconnaissance squadron
- Batterie de renseignement brigade
