= 1st Armored Division (France) =

French Army formation

- 1^{re} Division Blindée
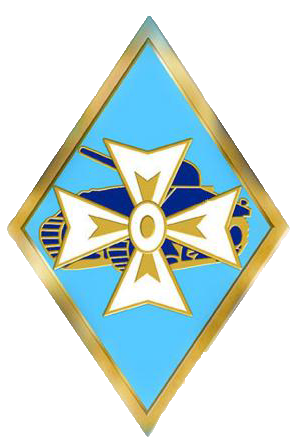
- Emblem of the Division
- Active: May 1, 1943 – March 31, 1946; 1948 – July 1, 1999; July 1, 2016 – present
- Country: France
- Branch: French Army
- Type: Armored division
- Role: Armoured warfare
- Size: ~ 25,000
- Garrison/HQ: Besançon
- Nickname: division Saint-Louis
- Mottos: Nomine et Virtute Prima (First by Name and Valor)
- Anniversaries: May 1st
- Engagements: World War II

The 1st Armored Division (French: 1^{re} Division Blindée, 1^{re} DB) is a unit of the French Army formed during World War II that took part in the Liberation of France.

The division was dissolved for the first time in 1946, and was recommissioned in 1948. It was dissolved again in 1999 as a consequence of the professionalization of the French military.

The 1st Mechanised Brigade (1^{re} BM), created on July 1, 1999, inherited the division's traditions. The 1st Mechanised Brigade was again dissolved on July 21, 2015. The 1st Division (1^{re} DIV) was recreated in 2016.

== Creation and different names ==
- The 1st Armored Division (1^{re} DB) was created on May 1, 1943.
- It was dissolved on March 31, 1946.
- The 1st Armored Division was recreated in 1948.
- On July 1, 1999, the 1st Mechanised Brigade (1^{re} BM) inherited the traditions of the division.
- The 1st Mechanised Brigade was dissolved on July 21, 2015.
- The 1st Division (1^{re} DIV) was recreated on July 1, 2016, part of the Scorpion Force alongside the 3rd Division.

== Division emblem and motto ==
The Latin motto of the division, Nomine et Virtute Prima, translates literally to "La première par le nom et la valeur" in French, and "The first by name and valor" in English.

The choice of the insignia, the cross of Saint Louis by général Jean Touzet du Vigier, derives from Tunisia, the place where the unit was formed, and also where King Louis IX of France was laid to rest in 1270. Behind the cross of Saint Louis is an M4 Sherman tank, which was widely used by all Free French armored forces during World War II.

The division is known and referred to as the "Saint-Louis division".

The division was cited three times during the Second World War.

== History ==
=== 1943–1946 ===
In 1943, Free-French armed forces were formed in exile in the French colonies of Africa under the command of General De Gaulle. The units were equipped by the United States, and the program anticipated creating several divisions. Following the arrival of equipment in North Africa from the US, only three divisions were constituted, each comprising the following units:

- One command staff
- One company of headquarter staff
- Three command staff brigade
- One reconnaissance regiment
- Three tank regiments
- One chasseur tank regiment
- Three mounted infantry battalions
- Three artillery groups
- One engineer battalion
- One group FTA
- One repair group squadron
- One transmission company
- One service company
- One medical battalion
- One exploitation group

These divisions were organised according to American Tables of Organization and Equipment, in three combat commands. The three French divisions were organised in this way for the duration of 1944-1945 operations.

Within this context, the 1st Armored Division (1st DB) was formed on May 1, 1943. The division was heir to the Light Mechanised Brigade (French: Brigade Légère Mécanique, BLM) which saw combat in Tunisia. On January 28, 1943, General Jean Touzet du Vigier (promoted on December 25, 1942) took command of this unit as it was being formed. He left the command of the BLM to General Auguste-Marie Brossin de Saint-Didier and installed his command post in Mascara, Algeria, the training center for armored brigades.

When first established, the 1st DB consisted of a reconnaissance regiment, the 3rd Chasseurs d'Afrique, of Constantine, Algeria; two tank regiments, the 2nd Chasseurs and 5th Chasseurs d'Afrique, Oran and Maison Carrée; and a fourth Chasseurs d'Afrique regiment, the 9th Chasseurs, which was equipped with tank destroyers. Adding to these four formations were one mounted regiment, the 2nd Zouaves, of Oran, the 68th Artillery Regiment, of Tunisia; the 88th Engineer Battalion, recently created at Port-Lyautey, and the 38th FTA group, of Ténès. During May 1943, the transmission and service companies joined, and in August, the train and a squadron group reinforced them. Then the 2nd Chasseurs d'Afrique was divided (doubled) to form 2nd Tank-Cuirassiers Regiment, a regiment that Général du Vigier commanded in 1940. The latter had just been promoted to a divisional general on August 25, and all the forces under his command were grouped around Mascara.

The 2nd Zouaves Regiment disappeared and was replaced, as the infantry of the division, by three independent battalions, the 1st, 2nd and 3rd Zouaves, forming a demi-brigade. The division became part of the First Army (then designated Army B) and which participated in the amphibious assault on Provence. The initial embarkation began in Oran and Mers-el-Kébir at the end of July 1944, after several manoeuvres. The naval ships lifted anchor on August 10 and 11. The disembarkment was to take place between Saint-Tropez and Saint-Raphaël. At dawn on August 15, an enormous naval fleet was assembled north-west of Corsica heading north.

The operations of the 1st Armored Division throughout the course of World War II comprised three phases:

- From the Mediterranean to the Vosges, August 15 to November 13, 1944
- Combat in Alsace, November 14, 1944 to February 9, 1945
- February 10 to May 7, 1945

==== Mediterranean to the Vosges, August 15 to November 13, 1944 ====
Throughout the course of the first phase of operations, the CC1 was engaged in battle, then the entire division complemented by the VI Corps, fought in the sieges of Toulon and Marseille, and the liberation of Provence. The unit reached the Rhône in a series of rapid advances, then regrouped, west of the river, for fifteen days. After disembarking, the division engaged in an advance of 600 kilometers, which would bring them to the footsteps of the Vosges, following an uninterrupted series of combat engagements, which led to the liberation of Saint-Étienne, Lyon, Anse and Villefranche, Chalon-sur-Saône, Chagny, Beaune, Dijon and Langres. Next began a slow and difficult climb into the valleys of the Vosges, in mud and rain and snow. After 45 days of marching towards Le Thillot, liberating Mélisey, Servance, Haut-du-Them-Château-Lambert, Ramonchamp, Cornimont, Travexin, Fresse, the Col de la Chevestraye, Recologne, the chapel of Ronchamp, and Bourlémont, the division finally entered the Belfort Gap on October 18, 1944.

Following this first phase of operations, the 1st DB was cited in dispatches for its combat performance.

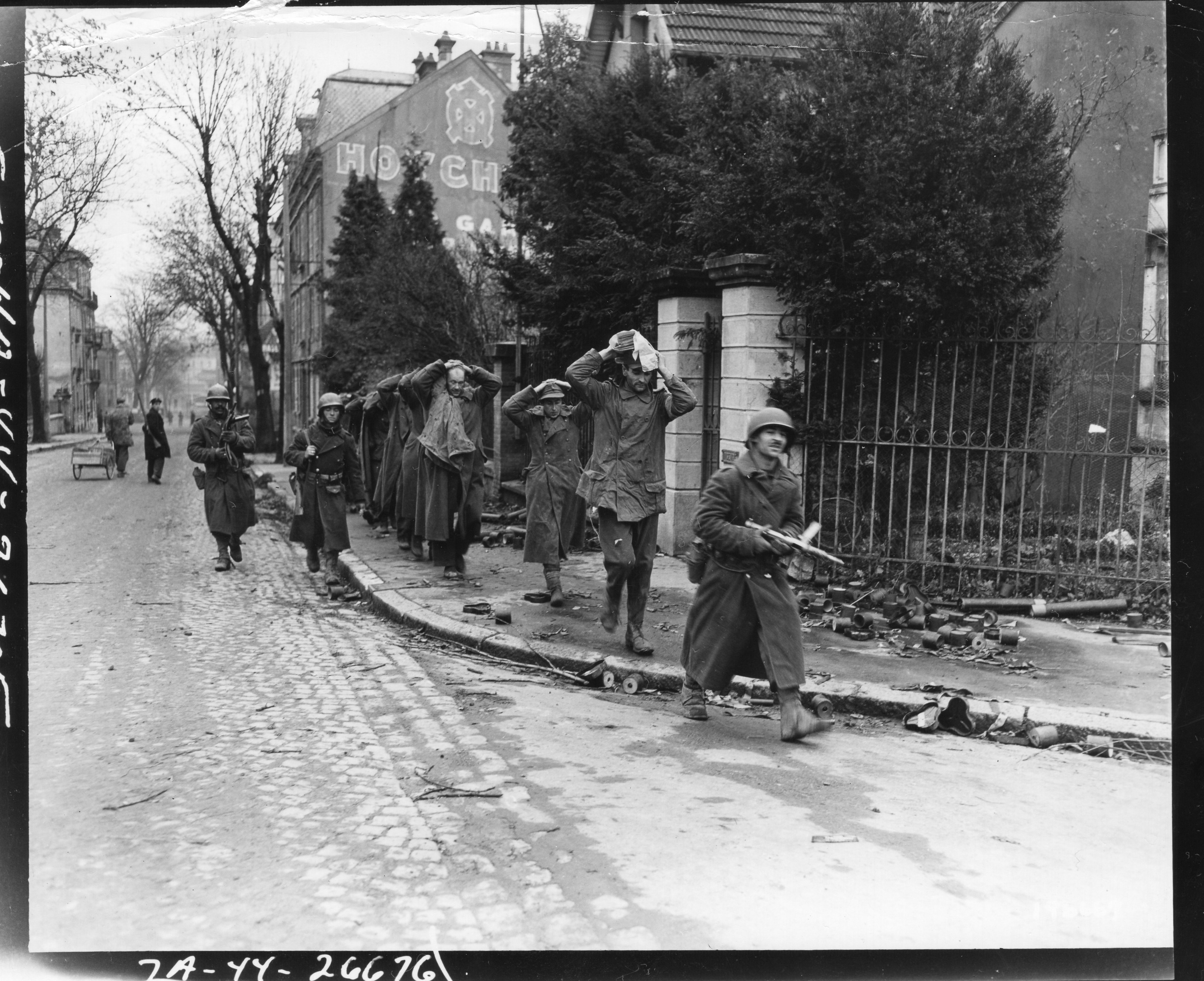
A group of German snipers, taken during the fight for a road leading out of Belfort, France, is led through the streets of the city by members of the 1st French Armored Division, 22 November 1944

==== Combat for Alsace November 14, 1944 to February 9, 1945 ====
In the second phase of combat, the 1st DB was the first unit to penetrate Alsace and the first to reach the Rhine River. Advancing on November 14 from the high valley of the Doubs, the 1st DB mounted an offensive on Belfort. Operating under the 1st Army Corps of General Antoine Béthouart, it manoeuvred to Héricourt along the French-Swiss border and captured Delle on November 18. The next day, the CC3 was in Alsace and, at 1800, the tank platoon of Lieutenant Loisy was able to raise its standard on the banks of the Rhine at Rosenau. He was part of the 4th squadron of the 2nd African Chasseur Regiment and met his end on November 23 when his tank was hit by an anti-tank launcher during the attack on the Lefebvre barracks at Mulhouse. On 20 November, Colonel Caldairou entered the city. Despite the success of the rendezvous of the 1st and 2nd Army Corps near Burnhaupt, Colmar remained well protected. For the next two months, the division held a defensive sector in the snow on the Dollar River, south of what would later be referred to as the Colmar Pocket. On January 20, the 1st Army relaunched an assault on the two northern and southern flanks of the pocket, in the middle of a snow storm. Following a three-week struggle, Alsace was liberated and Colmar seized on February 2. The division, which had engaged in combat since December 5 under the orders of General Aimé Sudre, following an annoying delay in two minefields, achieved a breakthrough which led to the capture of Chalampé on the morning of February 9. Accordingly, the division completed its role in the campaign of France, which started on August 15, 1944, and which ended six months later on the Rhine.

Following this second phase of operations, the 1st DB was again cited in dispatches for its combat performance.

==== February 10 – May 7, 1945 ====
At the beginning of the third phase, starting April 5, the CC2 was in Germany. The 9th Colonial Infantry Division, cleared a path through the Black Forest, to free for the 1st Army important routes. Later to the turn, the CC3 combat engaged supporting the colonials. Following a march on Kehl and Offenburg, they made their way south to take Freiburg im Breisgau on April 21. They rejoined the division on the 28th south-west of Ulm. The 1st Armored Division crossed the Rhine on April 17. General Sudre regrouped means at the exception of CC3 around Freudenstadt, and while acting with the cadre of the 1st Army Corps, his unit mounted the assault. The division accordingly made their way to the Danube by Rottweil and Horb am Neckar, crossed the river on April 21 at Müllheim and Tuttlingen, and while engaging Stockach, pushed back along the Danube through Sigmaringen to Ulm, which was taken in liaison with the American 7th United States Army arriving from the north. The 1^{re} DB took Immenstadt on April 30 and on the same day reached the Austrian frontier to occupy Aach and Oberstdorf. With only the field of mountains in plain sight, the division opened the way for the infantry and regrouped around Biberach. First to the Rhine, first to the Danube, the division with the Cross of Saint-Louis reached objectives following a sequence of successful event combat engagement series. The division played a decisive role towards the final campaign. The CC2 in the Black Forest, the CC3 in the fields of Bade, then the entire division engaged in combat until May 7.

Following this ultimate and third phase operations, the 1^{e} DB was cited for a third time at the orders of the armed forces.

==== End of the war ====
Following the cessation of hostilities, the 1^{e}re DB joined Palatinat, around Landau. The division remained there for two months. The division sent to Berlin the first detachment in charge of representing France, on July 1, composed of : a squadron of the 3rd African Chasseur Regiment, a squadron of the 9th, 2 companies of the 1st and 3rd Zouaves, and a train detachment. On September 5, the headquarter staff of the division garrisoned at Trèves. The 1^{re} DB, with reduced effectif by the demobilization, returned to France and garrisoned, October 1945 to March 1946 in the zones of Bourges, Châtellerault, Nantes and Angoulême. The division was dissolved on March 31, 1946.

==== WWII Commanders ====
- Major-General Jean Touzet du Vigier (1 May 1943 - 8 January 1945)
- Major-General Aimé Sudre (8 January 1945 - 1948)

==== Composition in 1944 ====
The 1^{re} DB which disembarked in Provence in August 1944 was composed of 73% Europeans and 27% Indigènes.

Organic units:

- 3rd African Chasseur Regiment (French: 3^{e} régiment de chasseurs d'Afrique, 3^{e} RCA) : régiment de reconnaissance
- 9th African Chasseur Regiment (French: 9^{e} régiment de chasseurs d'Afrique, 9^{e} RCA) : régiment de chasseurs de chars équipé de Tank Destroyer (TD)
- 38^{e} groupe de FTA : artillerie antiaérienne
- 88^{e} bataillon du génie
- Régiment du train divisionnaire
- 291^{e} compagnie de transport
- 91/84^{e} compagnie de transmissions
- 11^{e} GERD
- 15^{e} bataillon médical
- CC1
  - 2nd Cuirassiers Regiment (French: 2^{e} régiment de cuirassiers, 2^{e} RC) : régiment de chars
  - 2nd Zouaves Regiment (French: 2^{e} bataillon de Zouaves, 2^{e} RZ) : infanterie portée
  - 68th Artillery Regiment, I/68th (French: 68e régiment d'artillerie, 68^{e} RA) : artillerie
- CC2
  - 5th African Chasseur Regiment (French: 5e régiment de chasseurs d'Afrique, 5^{e} RCA): régiment de chars
  - 1st Zouaves Regiment (French: 1^{er} bataillon de Zouaves, 1^{e} RZ) : infanterie portée
  - III/68th : artillerie
- CC3.
  - 2nd African Chasseur Regiment (French: 2^{e} régiment de chasseurs d'Afrique, 2^{e} RCA) : régiment de chars
  - 3rd Zouaves Regiment (French: 3^{e} bataillon de Zouaves, 3^{e} RZ) : infanterie portée
  - II/68th : artillerie

==== Organization of the mounted Zouaves battalions ====
The infantry of the 1^{re} DB was constituted of three mounted Zouaves battalions (French: bataillons de zouaves portés, BZP) organized as follows:

One BZP was assigned to each of the three Combat Commands which composed the 1^{e} Armored Division. The battalion establishment was almost 800 men (Pied-Noirs, Metropolitan French and Maghrebis), in 3 combat companies with 180 to 200 men each. Each company consisted of three combat sections (platoons) of almost fifty men mounted in 5 half-tracks (armed with machine guns, mortars and 57mm anti-tank guns).

A variety of circumstances marked the battle of St-Loup-de-la-Salle, on September 6, 1944, almost 30 kilometers east of Tailly. The entire BZP endured the heavy attack. earlier in the campaign, meeting engagements were also expected, which often led the Zouaves to travel on the backs of the Division's tanks. But the Zouaves also mounted assaults by themselves.

This was the case on September 9 in front of Nuits-St-Georges. A company of the 3rd BZP was ordered to capture the town. Tanks were occupied in Beaune and were unable to provide fire support. Resistance was strong, and companies without fire support took heavy losses. As tanks arrived, the assault was relaunched. Losses were heavy. The infantry accompanying the 1^{e} DB endured 1,700 men out of the initial infantry complement of 2,400 killed in action and wounded - almost 72% of the division's initial infantry force. Losses were replaced by reinforcements sent from North Africa as well as numerous volunteers who enlisted as villages and cities were being liberated.

=== 1948 to 1999 ===
The 1st Armoured Division was recreated in 1948.

In 1951, the general headquarter staff garrisoned at Trèves in Germany. The division was part of the French Forces in Germany (French: Forces françaises en Allemagne, FFA).

Composition in 1985:

- 1^{er} Régiment de cuirassiers de St Wendel
- 6^{e} Régiment de dragons de Saarburg
- 8^{e} Groupe de chasseurs de Wittlich
- 16^{e} Groupe de chasseurs de Saarburg
- 153^{e} Régiment d'infanterie de Mutzig
- 9^{e} Régiment d'artillerie de marine de Trèves
- 61^{e} Régiment d'artillerie de Morhange
- 13^{e} Régiment de génie de Trèves
- 1^{er} Escadron d'éclairage divisionnaire de St Wendel
- 1^{er} Régiment de commandement et de soutien de Trèves

From 1993 to 1999, the 1re Division Blindée was part of the Eurocorps.

=== 1999–2015 ===
On July 1, 1999, the 1st Armored Division became the 1st Mechanised Brigade. The general headquarter staff garrisoned at Châlons-en-Champagne. The 1st Mechanised Brigade was dissolved on July 21, 2015.

=== Since 2016 ===
After the 1999 reorganisation, EMF 1 (État-major de force 1) was created on 1 July 1999 at quartier Ruty in Besançon, as a NATO type division headquarters that could supervise 20–30,000 personnel. EMF 1 was dissolved in 2016 and the 1st Division recreated from it.

The 1st Division was recreated on July 1, 2016. The division, a combined arms formation, comprises three brigades as well as French units of the Franco-German Brigade and is part of the Scorpion Force alongside the 3rd Division.

== Organization ==
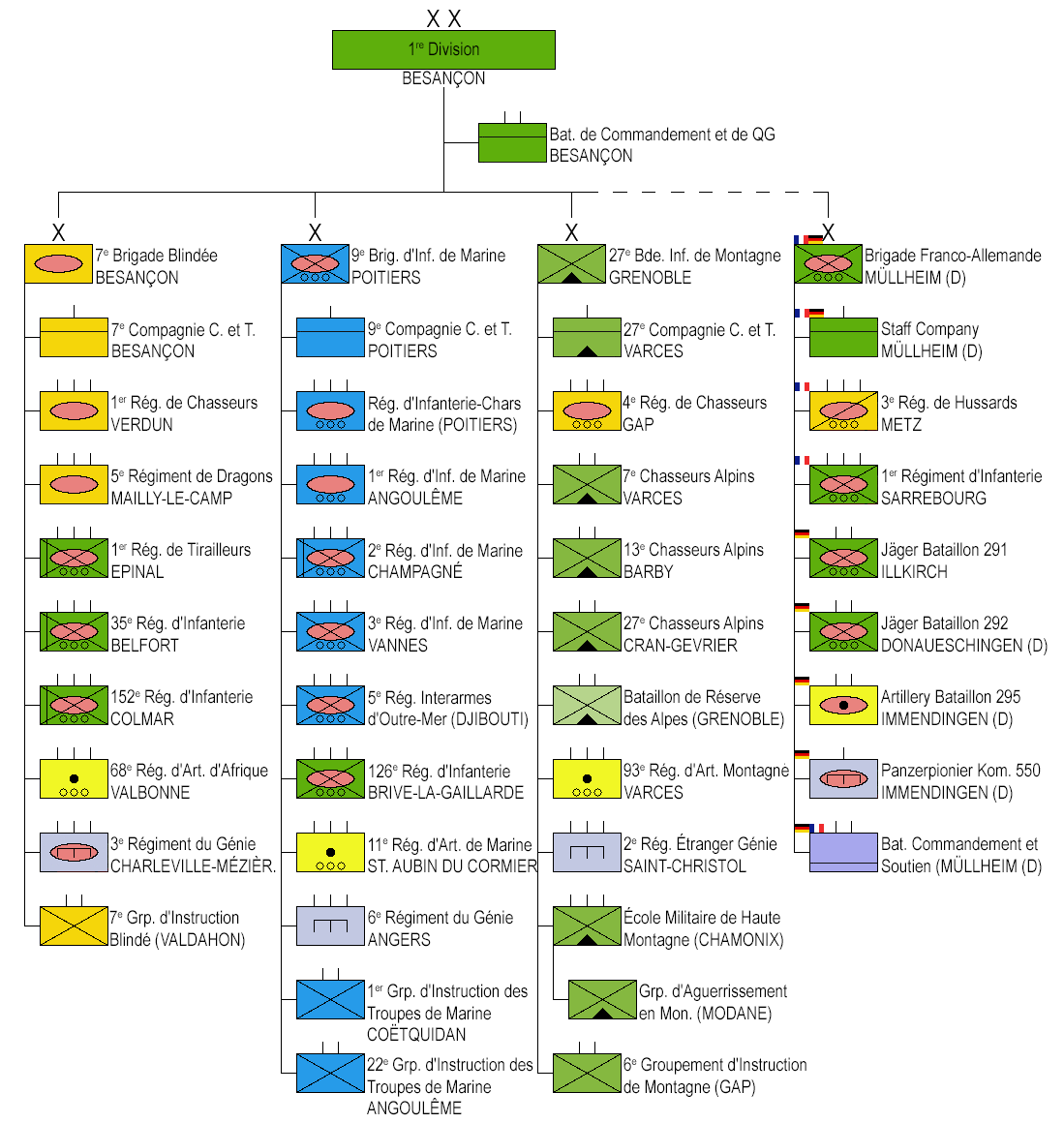
1^{er} Division organization 2025

The 1st Division is based in Besançon and is subordinated to the Commandement de la Force et des Opérations Terrestres (CFOT). The division is made up of 25,000 personnel.

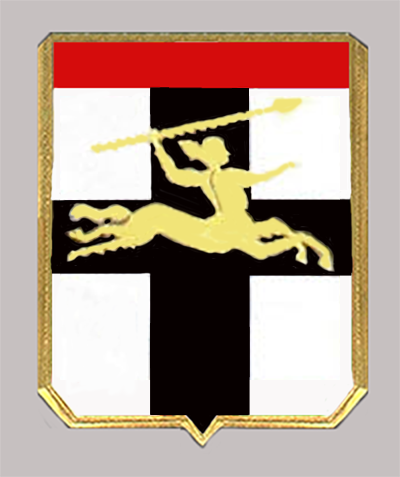
Badge of the 7th Armored Brigade

- 7^{e} Brigade Blindée (7^{e} BB) – 7th Armored Brigade, in Besançon
  - 7^{e} Compagnie de Commandement et de Transmissions Blindée (7^{e} CCTB) - 7th Armored Command and Signals Company (VAB), in Besançon
  - 1^{er} Régiment de Chasseurs (1^{er} RCh) - 1st Chasseurs Regiment (Leclerc MBTs, VBL vehicles), in Verdun
  - 5^{e} Régiment de Dragons (5^{e} RD) - 5th Dragoon Regiment (Leclerc MBTs, VBCI IFVs, VAB Génie, VBL vehicles), in Mailly-le-Camp
  - 1^{er} Régiment de Tirailleurs (1^{er} RTir) - 1st Tirailleur Regiment (VBCI IFVs), in Epinal
  - 35^{e} Régiment d'Infanterie (35^{e} RI) - 35th Infantry Regiment (VBCI IFVs), in Belfort
  - 152^{e} Régiment d'Infanterie (152^{e} RI) - 152nd Infantry Regiment (VBCI IFVs) in Colmar
  - 68^{e} Régiment d'Artillerie d'Afrique (68^{e} RAA) - 68th African Artillery Regiment (CAESAR howitzers, RTF1 mortars, Mistral missiles), in Valbonne
  - 3^{e} Régiment du Génie (3^{e} RG) - 3rd Engineer Regiment (VAB Génie), in Charleville-Mézières
  - 7^{e} Groupement d'Instruction Blindé (7^{e} GIB) - 7th Armored Instruction Group, in Valdahon

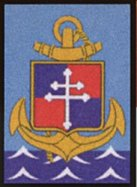
Badge of the 9th Marine Infantry Brigade

- 9^{e} Brigade d'Infanterie de Marine (9^{e} BIMa) - 9th Marine Infantry Brigade, in Poitiers
  - 9^{e} Compagnie de Commandement et de Transmissions de Marine (9^{e} CCTMa) - 9th Marine Command and Signals Company (VAB), in Poitiers
  - Régiment d'Infanterie-Chars de Marine (RICM) - Marine Infantry Tank Régiment (EBRC Jaguar vehicles), in Poitiers
  - 1^{er} Régiment d'Infanterie de Marine (1^{er} RIMa) - 1st Marine Infantry Regiment (AMX-10 RC, VAB, VBL vehicles, being replaced by EBRC Jaguar vehicles), in Angoulême
  - 2^{e} Régiment d'Infanterie de Marine (2^{e} RIMa) - 2nd Marine Infantry Regiment (VBCI IFVs), in Champagné
  - 3^{e} Régiment d'Infanterie de Marine (3^{e} RIMa) - 3rd Marine Infantry Regiment (VBMR Griffon), in Vannes
  - 5^{e} Régiment Interarmes d'Outre-mer (5^{ee} RIAOM) - 5th Overseas Interarms Regiment, in Djibouti City (Djibouti)
  - 126^{e} Régiment d'Infanterie (126^{e} RI) - 126th Infantry Regiment (VAB vehicles, being replaced by VBMR Griffon), in Brive-la-Gaillarde
  - 11^{e} Régiment d'Artillerie de Marine (11^{e} RAMa) - 11th Marine Artillery Regiment (CAESAR howitzers, RTF1 mortars, VBMR Griffon MEPAC mortar carriers, Mistral missiles), in Saint-Aubin-du-Cormier
  - 6^{e} Régiment du Génie (6^{e} RG) - 6th Engineer Regiment (VAB Génie), in Angers
  - 1^{er} Groupement d'Instruction des Troupes de Marine (1^{er} GITdM) - 1st Marine Instruction Group, in Coëtquidan
  - 22^{e} Groupement d'Instruction des Troupes de Marine (22^{e} GITdM) - 22nd Marine Instruction Group, in Angoulême

Badge of the 27th Mountain Infantry Brigade

- 27^{e} Brigade d’Infanterie de Montagne (27^{e} BIM) – 27th Mountain Infantry Brigade, in Grenoble
  - 27^{e} Compagnie de Commandement et de Transmissions de Montagne (27^{e} CCTM) - 27th Mountain Command and Signals Company, in Varces
  - 4^{e} Régiment de Chasseurs (4^{e} RCh) - 4th Chasseurs Regiment (AMX-10 RC, ERC 90, VAB, VBL vehicles, being replaced by EBRC Jaguar vehicles), in Gap
  - 7^{e} Bataillon de Chasseurs Alpins (7^{e} BCA) - 7th Mountain Infantry Battalion (VAB, VHM vehicles), in Varces
  - 13^{e} Bataillon de Chasseurs Alpins (13^{e} BCA) - 13th Mountain Infantry Battalion (VBMR Griffon, VHM vehicles), in Barby
  - 27^{e} Bataillon de Chasseurs Alpins (27^{e} BCA) - 27th Mountain Infantry Battalion (VAB, VHM vehicles), in Cran-Gevrier
  - Bataillon de Réserve des Alpes - Reserve Battalion of the Alps, in Grenoble
  - 93^{e} Régiment d'Artillerie de Montagne (93^{e} RAM) - 93rd Mountain Artillery Regiment (CAESAR howitzers, RTF1 mortars, Mistral missiles), in Varces
  - 2^{e} Régiment Étranger de Génie (2^{e} REG) - 2nd Foreign Engineer Regiment, in Saint-Christol
  - 6^{e} Groupement d'Instruction de Montagne (6^{e} GIM) - 6th Mountain Instruction Group, in Gap
  - École militaire de haute montagne (EMHM) - High Mountain Military School, in Chamonix
    - Groupement d'Aguerrissement en Montagne (GAM) - Mountain Acclimatization Grouping, in Modane

=== Franco-German Brigade ===
Badge of the Franco-German Brigade

Only the French units of the Franco-German Brigade are listed below.

- Brigade Franco-Allemande (BFA) – Franco-German Brigade, in Müllheim (Germany)
  - 1^{er} Régiment d'Infanterie (1^{er} RI) - 1st Infantry Regiment (VBMR Griffon), in Sarrebourg (France)
  - 3^{e} Régiment de Hussards (3^{e} RH) - 3rd Hussar Regiment (AMX-10 RC, VAB, VBL vehicles, being replaced by EBRC Jaguar vehicles), in Metz (France)
  - Bataillon de Commandement et de Soutien (BCS) - Command and Support Battalion, in Müllheim (Germany)
