= Éric Bellot des Minières =

French Army general (born 1964)

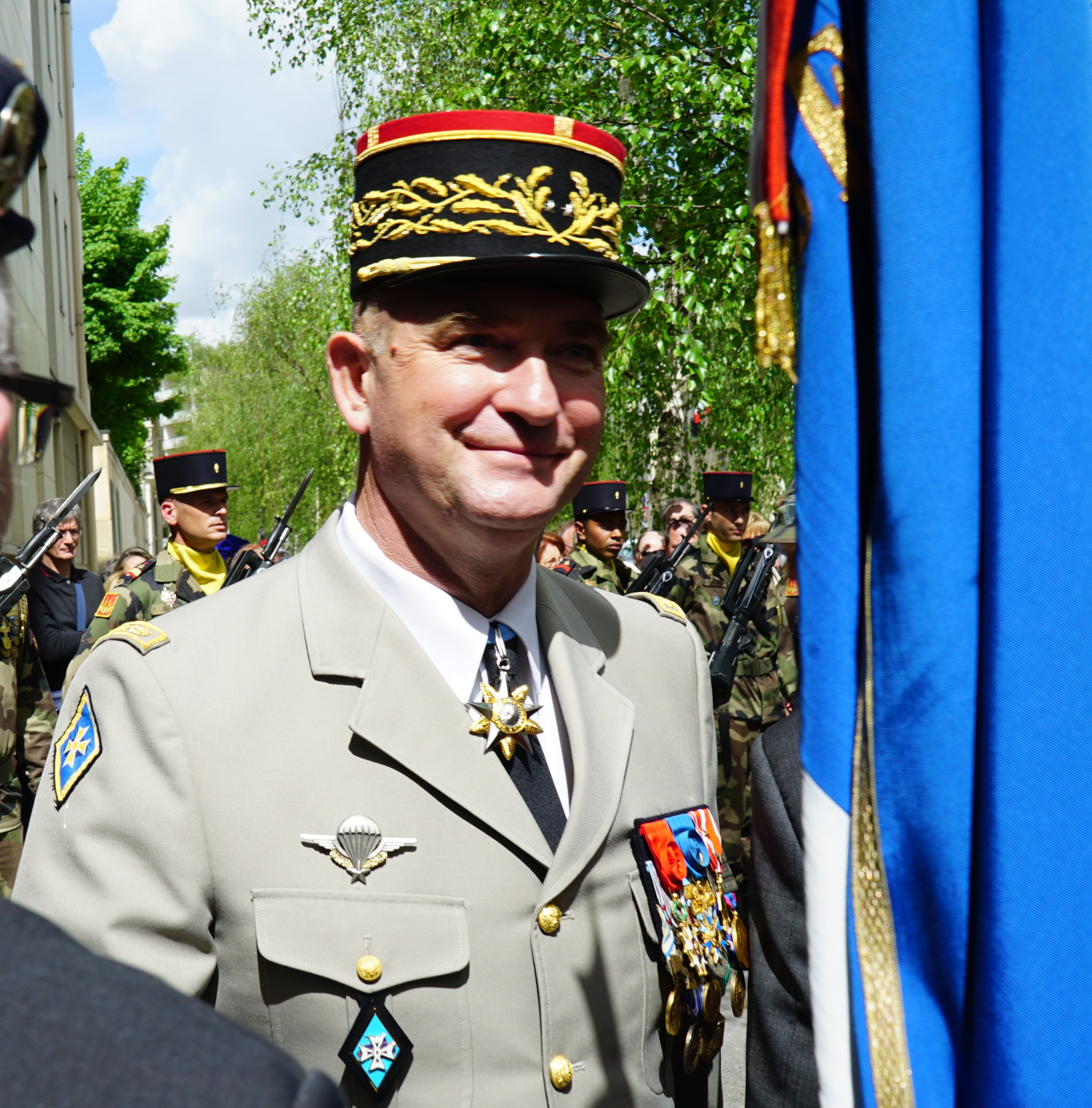
- Général de brigade Éric Bellot des Minières in 2015, commander of the 1st Mechanized Brigade
- Born: 5 April 1964 (age 62); Poitiers, Vienne
- Military career
- Allegiance: France
- Branch: French Army; French Foreign Legion
- Service years: 1984–present
- Rank: Général de division
- Commands: 2nd Foreign Parachute Regiment; 1st Mechanized Brigade; 11th Parachute Brigade
- Conflicts: Chad (Epervier 1988–1989, Guépard 1990), Rwanda (Noroît, 1991–1992), Djibouti (Godoria 1991, Iskoutir 1992 et 1993), Somalia (1992–1993), Central African Republic (EFAO, 1995), Kosovo (Trident, 2000–2001), Afghanistan (Pamir, GTIA Altor 2010), Central African Republic (Sangaris, 2014)

Éric Bellot des Minières (French: [eʁik bɛlo de minjɛʁ]; born 5 April 1964 in Poitiers) is an army general of the French Army. He has been Inspector General of the French Armed Forces since 31 October 2020.

== Biography ==
=== Famille ===
Éric Bellot des Minières is a member of an old French noble family.

=== Education ===
Bellot des Minières attended École spéciale militaire de Saint-Cyr from 1984 to 1987. He then attended ENSTA ParisTech graduating in 1999 with an Engineering diploma, and a specialisation in operational research.

=== Positions held ===
In 1988, he joined the 2nd Foreign Parachute Regiment in Calvi, where he served until 1995, after commanding the 3rd company. It was during this first stint at the 2nd REP that he took part in Operation Épervier (1988-1989) and Guépard (1990) in Chad, Operation Noroît (1991-1992) in Rwanda, Operation Godoria (1991) and Operation Iskoutir (1992 and 1993) in Djibouti, Somalia (1992-1993), and the EFAO (1995) in the Central African Republic. From 1995 to 1996, he was at the Staff School in Compiègne, before becoming an instructor and head of the "Tactical and Weapons Employment" course at the School of Transmission Application in Laval. After studying at ENSTA Paris (1997-199) then at the École de guerre (1999-2000), he returned to the 2nd REP in Calvi, where he took up the position of head of the operations and instruction office (BOI) from 2000 to 2002. During this period, he took part in operation Trident in Kosovo, from 2000 to 2001. From 2002 to 2006, he served at the General Staff of the Army as a "dismounted combat" synthesis officer to the Weapons System Office. From 2006 to 2008, he was assigned to the office of the Minister of Defence, first as deputy to the army/national theater-DOM-TOM cell, then deputy to the preparation for the future cell.

From 2008 to 2010, he was commanding officer of the 2nd REP in Calvi. During this period, he commanded the Battle Group Altor engaged from 13 January to 14 July 2010, as part of Brigade La Fayette in Afghanistan. During this operation his regiment is cited in the order of the army of the Cross for Military Valour. From 2010 to 2011, he was an auditor at the Center for Advanced Military Studies (CHEM) and at the Institute for Advanced National Defense Studies (IHEDN). From 2011 to 2014, he was assigned to the EMA as an operational coherence officer (OCO). The decree of 4 June 2014 appointed him commander of the 1st mechanized brigade from 1 August 2014. From 17 June 2014 to 29 March 2015 he commanded Operation Sangaris in the Central African Republic, where he relieved General Francisco Soriano. From 1 August 2015 to 31 July 2017 he commanded the 11th Parachute Brigade. He was appointed honorary corporal of the navy troops at the national gathering in Bazeilles on 31 August 2016. By decree of 24 January 2018 he was appointed Deputy Chief of Staff Plans of the General Staff armies. He was then appointed Chief of Staff Plans on 1 September 2018.

Since 31 October 2020 he has been Inspector General of the Armed Forces.

=== Military Facts ===
In 2010, he evokes the war in Afghanistan: “The first duty of the legionnaire is to fulfill the mission. […] The mission was a success. […] The human toll is three killed and 19 injured, including 12 by fire. […] We honor their death more than we mourn it. This is the Legionnaire's Code. »15. His superior, General Maurin describes him as a “man of contacts and friendships” and on the subject of the campaign in Afghanistan says of him: “The results are particularly glowing. Colonel Bellot des Minières showed a perfect understanding of the stakes of a war against the insurgency. He clearly imposed his operational mark on the regiment. »

== Publications ==
"Physical strength in the service of victory", in revue Inflexions, 2012/1 (n°19), p. 45-51

== Grades et Distinctions ==
=== Grades ===
Colonel: he was appointed on 4 June 2014 to the rank of general of brigade, and on 1 August 2017 to the rank of general of division. On 11 July 2018 he was elevated to the rank and designation of Army Corps General, and on 21 October 2020 appointed Inspector General of the Armed Forces and elevated to the rank and designation of Army General from the following 31 October.

=== Distinctions ===

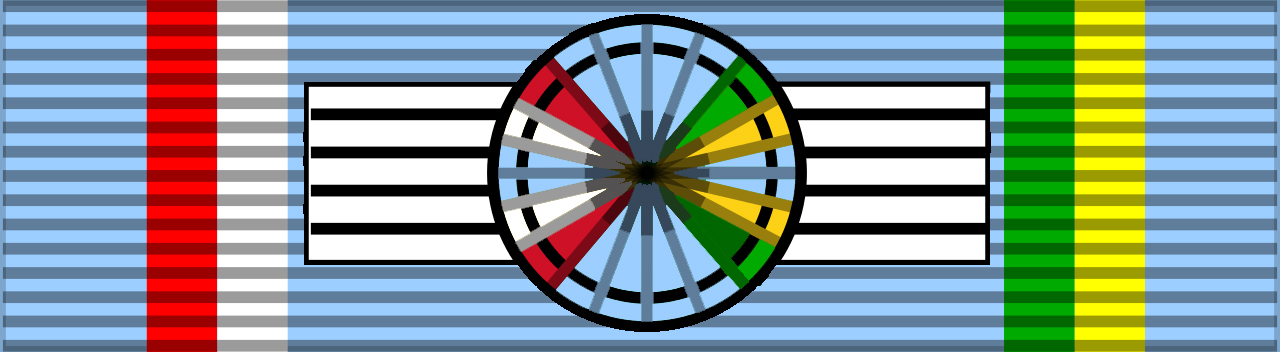

Éric Bellot des Minières was named Commander in the National Order of the Legion of Honor, and Officer in the Ordre national du Mérite.

He holds the following decorations:

- Croix de la Valeur militaire
- Croix du combattant
- Médaille d'Outre-Mer
- Médaille de la Défense nationale (médaille d'or)
- Médaille d’honneur pour acte de courage et de dévouement (médaille d'or)
- Médaille de Reconnaissance de la Nation (d'Afrique du Nord)
- Médaille commémorative française
- Médaille de la protection militaire du territoire
- Médaille de l'OTAN pour le Kosovo
- Médaille de l'OTAN Non-Article 5 pour l'ISAF (Afghanistan)
- US Army Commendation Medal
- Médaille du service de la Politique européenne de sécurité et de défense, EUFOR RCA
- Commandeur de l'ordre de la reconnaissance centrafricaine
- Croix de la Valeur Militaire Centrafricaine
