= Escadron d'Hélicoptères 5/67 Alpilles =

Helicopter Squadron 5/67 Alpilles
- Escadron d'Hélicoptères 5/67 Alpilles
- Country: France
- Branch: Armée de l'air et de l'espace
- Type: Military helicopter
- Garrison/HQ: BA 115 Orange-Caritat Air Base

Aircraft flown
- Transport: Eurocopter Fennec

Escadron d'Hélicoptères 5/67 Alpilles is a French Air and Space Force (Armée de l'air et de l'espace) Helicopter squadron located at BA 115 Orange-Caritat Air Base, Vaucluse, France which operates the Eurocopter Fennec.

During the December 2013 the unit sent one Fennec to the Central African Republic as part of Operation Sangaris.

== See also ==
- List of French Air and Space Force aircraft squadrons
