= Escadron d'Hélicoptères 3/67 Parisis =

Helicopter Squadron 3/67 Parisis
- Escadron d'Hélicoptères 3/67 Parisis
- Active: 1 October 1964 - present
- Country: France
- Branch: Armée de l'air et de l'espace
- Type: Military helicopter
- Garrison/HQ: BA 107 Vélizy – Villacoublay Air Base

Aircraft flown
- Transport: Eurocopter Fennec

Escadron d'Hélicoptères 3/67 Parisis is a French Air and Space Force (Armée de l'air et de l'espace) Helicopter Squadron located at BA 107 Vélizy – Villacoublay Air Base, Yvelines, France which operates the Eurocopter Fennec.

The unit was established on 1 October 1964, taking the 'Parisis' name from a disbanded fighter squadron of the 10e Escadre de Chasse.

During the December 2013 the unit sent one Fennec to the Central African Republic as part of Operation Sangaris.

== See also ==
- List of French Air and Space Force aircraft squadrons
