= 1st Marine Artillery Regiment (France) =

French Army infantry division (1962–2015)

- 1^{e} Régiment d'Artillerie de Marine.
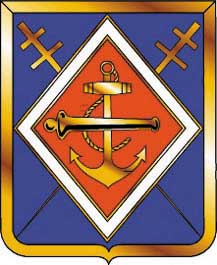
- Regimental insigne
- Active: 1692 - present
- Disbanded: 2015
- Country: France
- Branch: French Army
- Type: troupes de marine
- Role: Artillery
- Part of: 1st Mechanised Brigade
- Garrison/HQ: Châlons-en-Champagne, France
- Mottos: "The other terror after lightning" "ALTER POST FULMINA TERROR"
- Colors: Red and blue
- Anniversaries: Bazeilles

Insignia
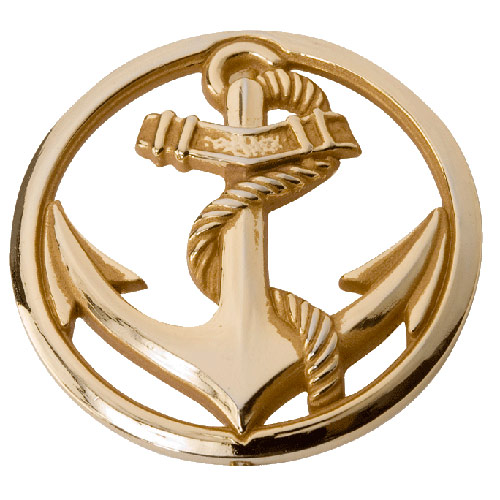
- Beret badge of the Troupes de Marine
- Abbreviation: 1^{er} RAMa

The 1st Marine Artillery Regiment (French: 1^{er} Régiment d'Artillerie de Marine, 1^{er} RAMa) is one of the oldest marine artillery units in the military of France, as part of the troupes de marine within the French Army. The régiment whose origins date back to the seventeenth century, was formally disbanded at Châlons-en-Champagne on 30 June 2015, ending nearly four centuries of service.

== History ==
With two infantry marine regiments it formed the 2nd Brigade of the Blue Division during the Franco-Prussian War. In 1968 it was based in Melun. Based in Laon since 1993, it is the artillery regiment of the 2nd Armoured Division.

1956 −1962: A detachment of the regiment participated in operations in Algeria.

1977: The regiment left Melun for the new garrison at Montlhéry.

1993: On 2 August the regiment took its new headquarters in Laon Couvron, a former air base.

1993 - 1996: The 1^{er} RAMa sends detachments in Bosnia and Herzegovina, in the Rapid Reaction Force (RRF) (Serb bombardment of the batteries Mount Igman) during the bombing of Bosnia Herzegovina by NATO 1995ou of IFOR, in charge of enforcing the Dayton.

2009: The regiment received the first cannon CAESAR June 10 This gun replaces the AMX AUF1 in service since 1990. On 1 August it left the 2nd Armoured Brigade, after 42 years and joined the 1st Mechanised Brigade.

2015: The regiment was formally disbanded at Châlons-en-Champagne, after nearly four centuries of service, on 30 June 2015.

== Etendard (Standard/Colours) of the regiment ==

The banner is decorated with the Cross of the Legion of Honor, the Croix de Guerre 1914-1918 (two palms), the Croix de Guerre 1939-1945 (three palms) and the Cross of Liberation. He is entitled to use the forage in the colors of ribbon the Croix de Guerre 1914 1918 since August 13, 1918, with olive-colored ribbon for the Croix de Guerre 1939-1945. Then from 18 June 1996 to feed the ribbon colors of the Croix de la Liberation.

== Honours ==
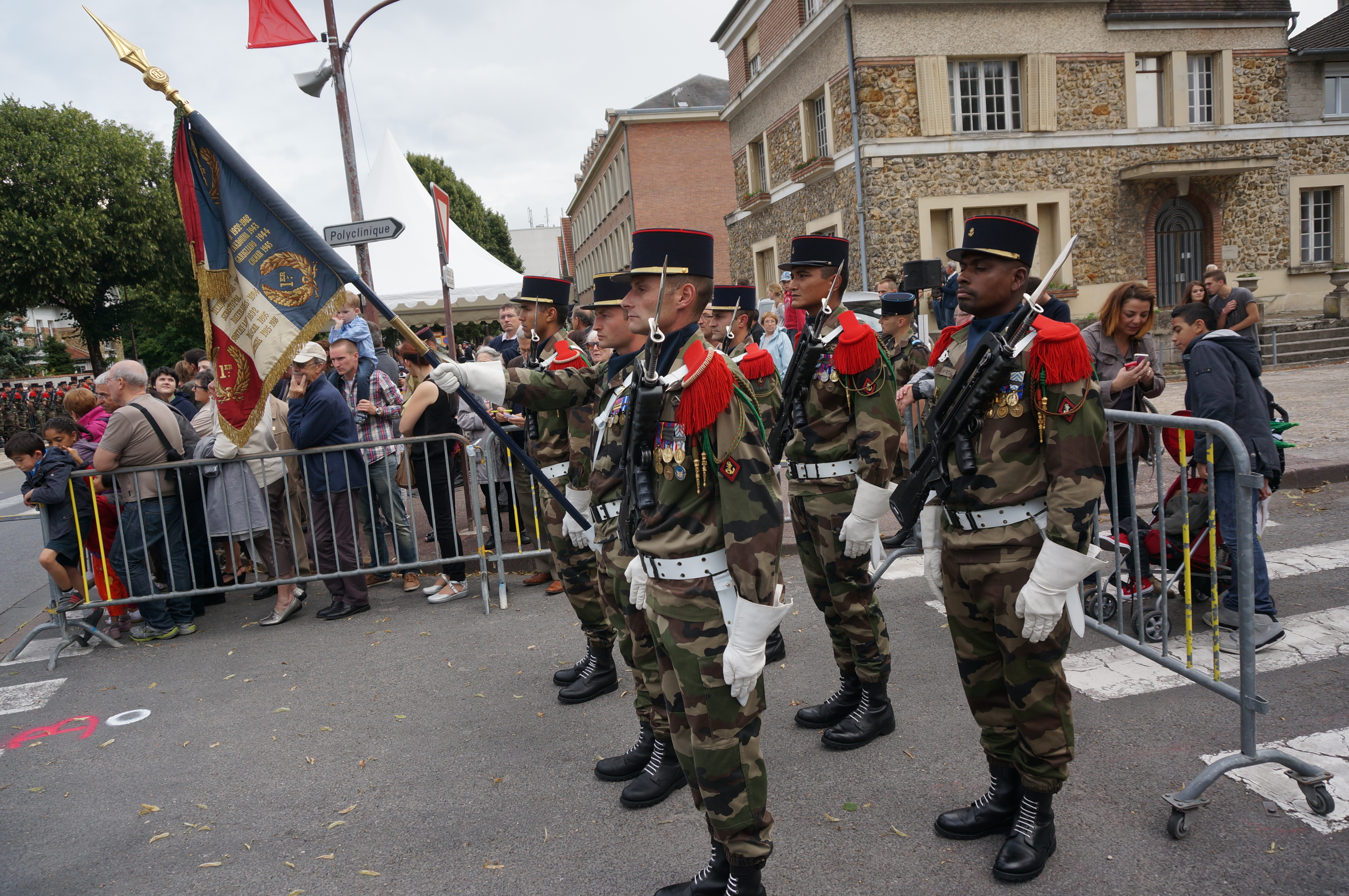
Flag

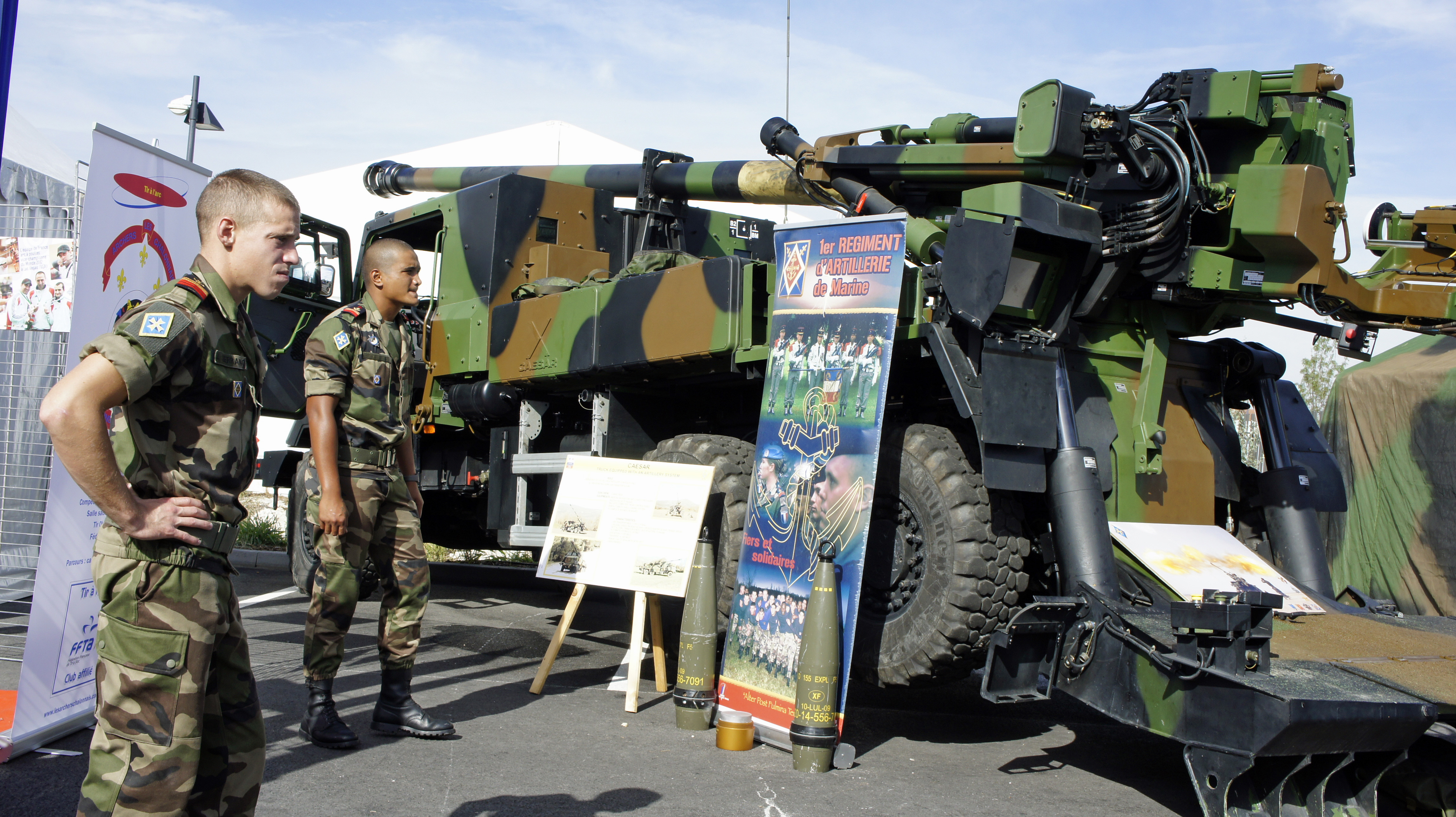
With CAESAR

=== Battle Honours ===
- Lutzen 1813
- Mexique 1838-1863
- Sebastopol 1855
- Bazeilles 1870
- Sontay-Langson 1883-1884
- Dahomey 1892
- Madagascar 1895
- Champagne 1915-1918
- La Somme 1916
- Bir-Hakeim 1942
- El-Alamein 1942
- Takrouna 1943
- Carigliano 1944
- Colmar 1945
- AFN 1952-1962

=== Decorations ===
- Cross of the Légion d'honneur
- Cross of the Liberation
- Croix de guerre 1914-1918 with 2 palms
- Croix de guerre 1939-1945 with 3 palms

== Sources and bibliography ==
- Duprat, François (1968-06-29). Les journées de Mai 68 - Les dessous d'une révolution. Nouvelles Editions Latines. ISBN 978-0-470-01745-6.
- "Le plus décoré des régiments d'artillerie de l'armée française tire sa révérence". Zone Militaire (in French). 2015-06-30.
- Erwan Bergot, La coloniale du Rif au Tchad 1925-1980, imprimé en France : décembre 1982, n° d'éditeur 7576, n° d'imprimeur 31129, sur les presses de l'imprimerie Hérissey.
