= Operation Sangaris =

2013–16 French mission in the Central African Republic

- Part of the Central African Republic Civil War
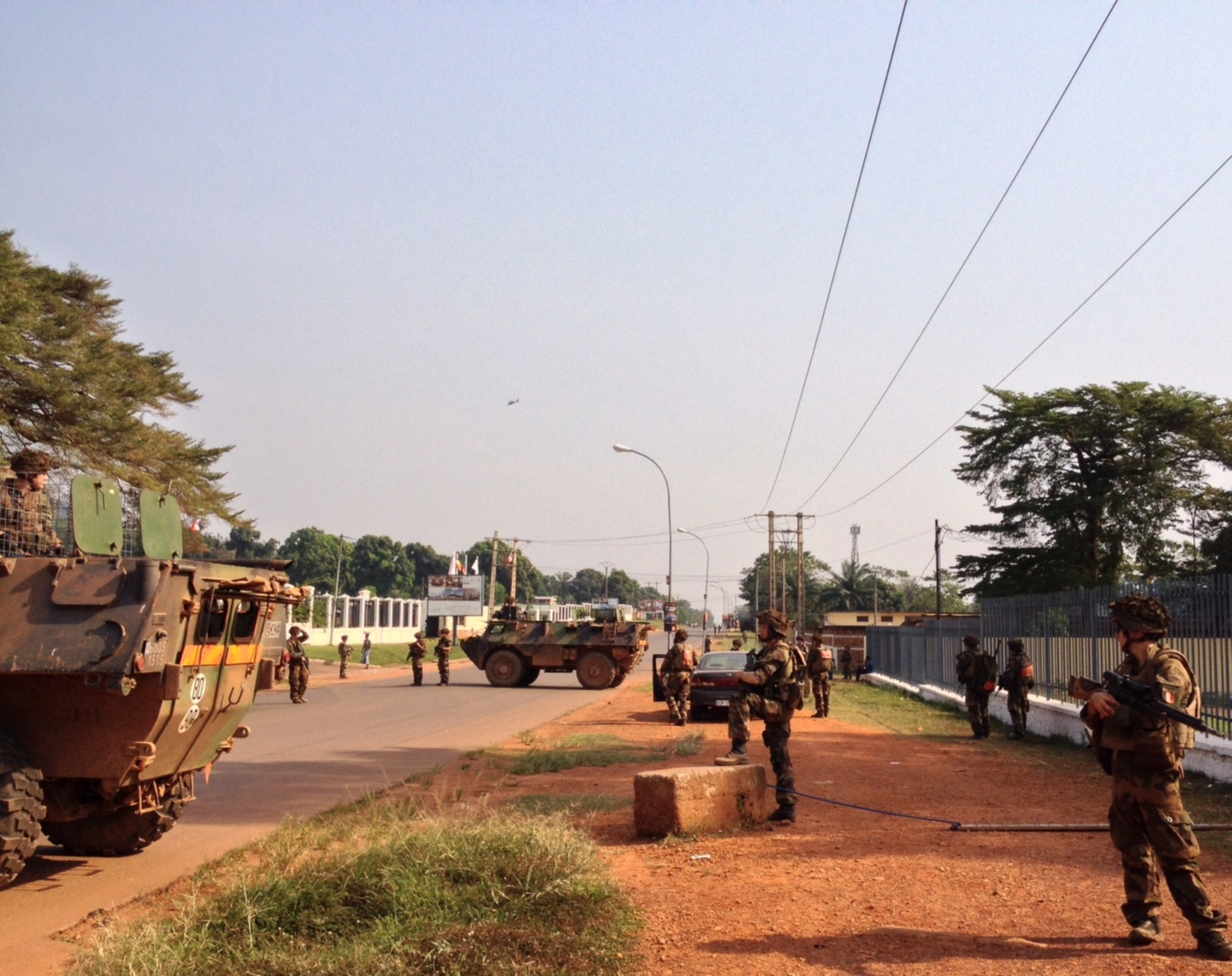
- French troops positioned in Bangui on 22 December 2013.
Date	5 December 2013 – 30 October 2016 (2 years, 10 months, 3 weeks and 6 days)
Location	Central African Republic
Result	Operation success: France claim to have succeeded in its mission to stop fighting in C.A.R.; Some 350 French soldiers to remain in the country to assist MINUSCA

Belligerents
France	Séléka Anti-balaka

Commanders and leaders
(France) François Hollande; (France) Jean-Yves Le Drian; Commandant: (France) General Francisco Soriano (5 December 2013 - 17 June 2014); (France) Éric Bellot des Minières (17 June 2014 - 29 March 2015); (France) Brig. General Pierre Gillet (29 March 2015 - 21 September 2015); (France) Col. Nicolas Guisse (21 September 2015 - 23 February 2016); (France) Col. François Beaucournu (23 February 2016 - 20 June 2016); (France) Col. Maxime Do Tran (20 June 2016 - 31 October 2016)	Unknown

Strength
2,000 men (up from an initial 1,600)	Unknown

Casualties and losses
3 killed	Unknown

Map of forces deployed in C.A.R. in 2014

Operation Sangaris was a French military intervention in the Central African Republic, from late 2013 till 2016. It was the seventh French military intervention there since the country gained independence from France in 1960. On 30 October 2016, France announced it was officially ending Operation Sangaris.

== Name ==
According to Jean-Vincent Brisset, senior researcher (Note: directeur de recherches) at Iris, the name refers to the African butterfly Cymothoe sangaris, and was chosen because "butterflies are not dangerous, do not last very long, are considered pretty and are politically correct". (Note: un papillon, ce n'est pas méchant, ça ne dure pas très longtemps, c’est considéré comme joli et politiquement correct)

== Background ==
In late 2012, President François Bozizé requested international aid from France and the US to fend off the Séléka, a rebel movement that had progressed to the vicinity of the capital Bangui. The Séléka is a Muslim and Northern movement fighting the Catholic South. In March 2013, Michel Djotodia ousted Bozizé from power and became the first Muslim President of the country.

In October 2013, fighting broke out between Séléka elements and Christian self-defence militias called anti-balakas, and the State lost its ability to maintain order.

The United Nations and the French government started voicing concerns of potential genocide.

On 5 December 2013, Resolution 2127 was unanimously voted by the United Nations Security Council to allow an African-led International Support Mission to the Central African Republic (MISCA) to be deployed for a 12-month duration to restore order and end religious tensions. The MISCA is supported by French forces authorised to use any necessary means.

== Chronology ==
=== Preparation ===
From 24 November 2013, around 30 personnel of the 25th Air Engineer Regiment, stationed in Libreville, were deployed to Bangui M'Poko International Airport. They were equipped with around 20 heavy engineering machines, sent over in an Antonov An-124 This group, quickly reinforced with elements from Istres-Le Tubé Air Base, was tasked with the restoration of the runways and of the logistic areas, as well as enlarging the passenger zones. This aimed at making the airport suitable for the arrival of the French force and its likely reinforcements.

On 28 November 2013, the BPC Dixmude, escorted by aviso Commandant L'Herminier, reached Douala harbour in Cameroon, ferrying 350 soldiers of the 11th Parachute Brigade and two Gazelle helicopters. From 1 December, elements of the operational reserve aboard Dixmude started landing operations, parking trucks, VAB and VBL armoured vehicles in Douala harbor.

On 30 November 2013, a 200-strong detachment arrived in Bangui in an Airbus A340 of 3/60 "Esterel" Squadron, comprising military communications specialists, personnel of the Military Fuel Service, and matériel. In the following days, a dozen Antonov An-124 rotations ferried the logistical and support matériel for their installation. According to the Chief of the Defence Staff, "the deployment was implemented as a consolidation and preparation for a possible increase of the deployment in Bangui, as the President of the Republic wishes". (Note: Ce déploiement a été réalisé au titre des mesures conservatoires et préparatoires à un éventuel renforcement du dispositif à Bangui, comme l’a souhaité le Président président de la République)

By 5 December 2013, the French military deployment in Bangui was over 600 strong, including 240 permanently detached from Opération Boali, a parallel peace-keeping operation ongoing in the Central African Republic since 2002. Two companies of the 8th Marine Infantry Parachute Regiment, the Second company of the 21st Marine Infantry Regiment, one company of the 3rd Marine Infantry Parachute Regiment, and elements of the 6th Marine Infantry Battalion and of the 1st Parachute Hussar Regiment were already deployed. The 25th Air Engineering Regiment is the first engineering unit to be deployed, along with elements from the 1st Parachute Chasseur Regiment.

== Start of Sangaris ==
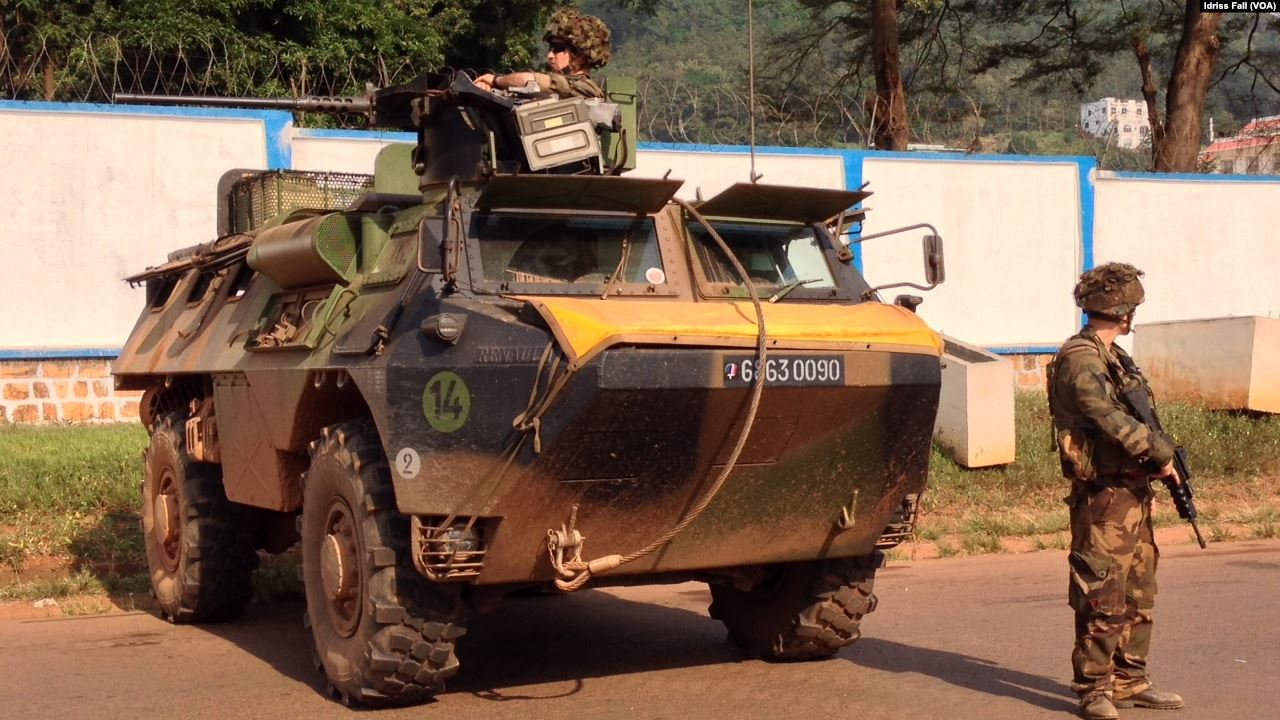
French soldiers of Opération Sangaris, on 22 December 2013, in Bangui.

Following Resolution 2127 of the United Nations Security Council, Sangaris officially began in the night of the 5 to 6 December, when General Francisco Soriano, commanding the operation, arrived in Bangui.

From 5 to 8 December, while the French forces were deploying, violent fighting broke out between Séléka and Anti-balaka. Amnesty International reported around 1000 Christians and 60 Muslims killed in two days. On the 5th, while French troops were securing the approaches to M’Poko Airport, where 2000 civilians had fled from the fighting, they sustained three attacks by an armed pick-up; by the third time, they replied in kind, destroying the vehicle. None of the French soldiers nor of the civilians they were protecting was harmed during the exchange.

Within the first 24 hours of Sangaris, the number of French troops doubled to reach 1200. On 7 December, the French military secured the capital city of Bangui, with difficulty as sporadic fighting was still ongoing. Meanwhile, a terrestrial operation from Cameroon allowed the French to secure the city of Bouar and enter Bossangoa.

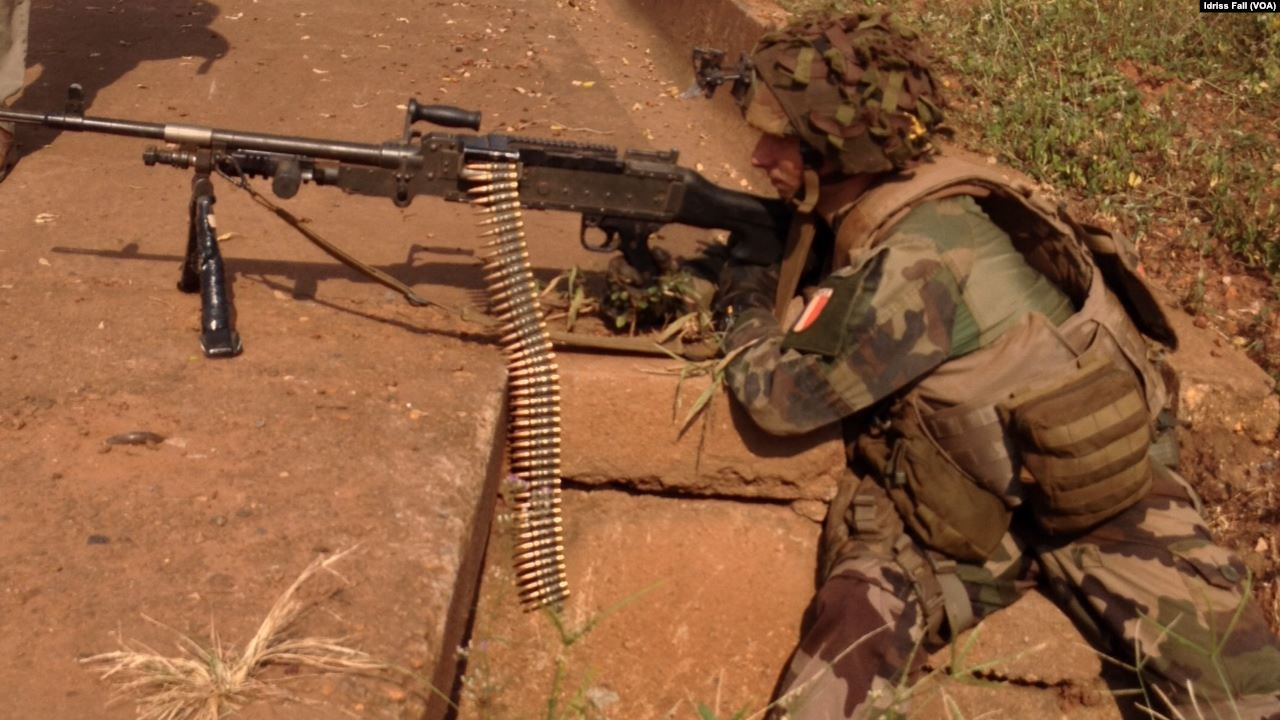
22 December 2013 in Bangui.

With the end of the "Peace and Security in Africa" summit in Paris, François Hollande announced that 1600 soldiers would be deployed "for as long as necessary" and that their mission would be to "disarm all militias and armed groups that terrorise the population"; he furthermore re-stated his intentions to have a "swift, efficient" French intervention that would bring about "the return of stability, and allow free and pluralist elections when in the fullness of time". By the end of the summit, the African Union had committed to increase the MISCA to 6000 men.

On the 6th, the Épervier Force, base in Chad, provided a C130 Hercules and a CN-235 CASA to airlift reinforcements from Libreville to Bangui. The same day, French forces started patrolling across Bangui, mounted or on foot, to secure French interests. Some patrols were mixed with elements of the MISCA. In the night of the 6 to 7 December, the troops landed by Dixmude crossed the Central-African border, while elements deployed outside of Bangui began to reconnoitre the road axis to the North. The reconnaissance detachment, around 100-man strong, reached Bossangoa without encountering resistance, but witnesses important numbers of refugees. Rafales from Ndjamena conducted air patrols and low-altitude shows of force above Bangui and Bossangoa to signal the French presence and bring about an end to infighting.

From the 7th, the Sangaris Force was further reinforced with helicopters, comprising two Gazelles and four Pumas. In the following hours, an Antonov An-124 ferrying two Fennecs from Vélizy – Villacoublay Air Base and Orange-Caritat Air Base arrived.

On the 8th, the French headquarters announced that the Bouar-Bossembélé road had been opened without resistance.

=== Disarmament of armed groups (December 2013) ===
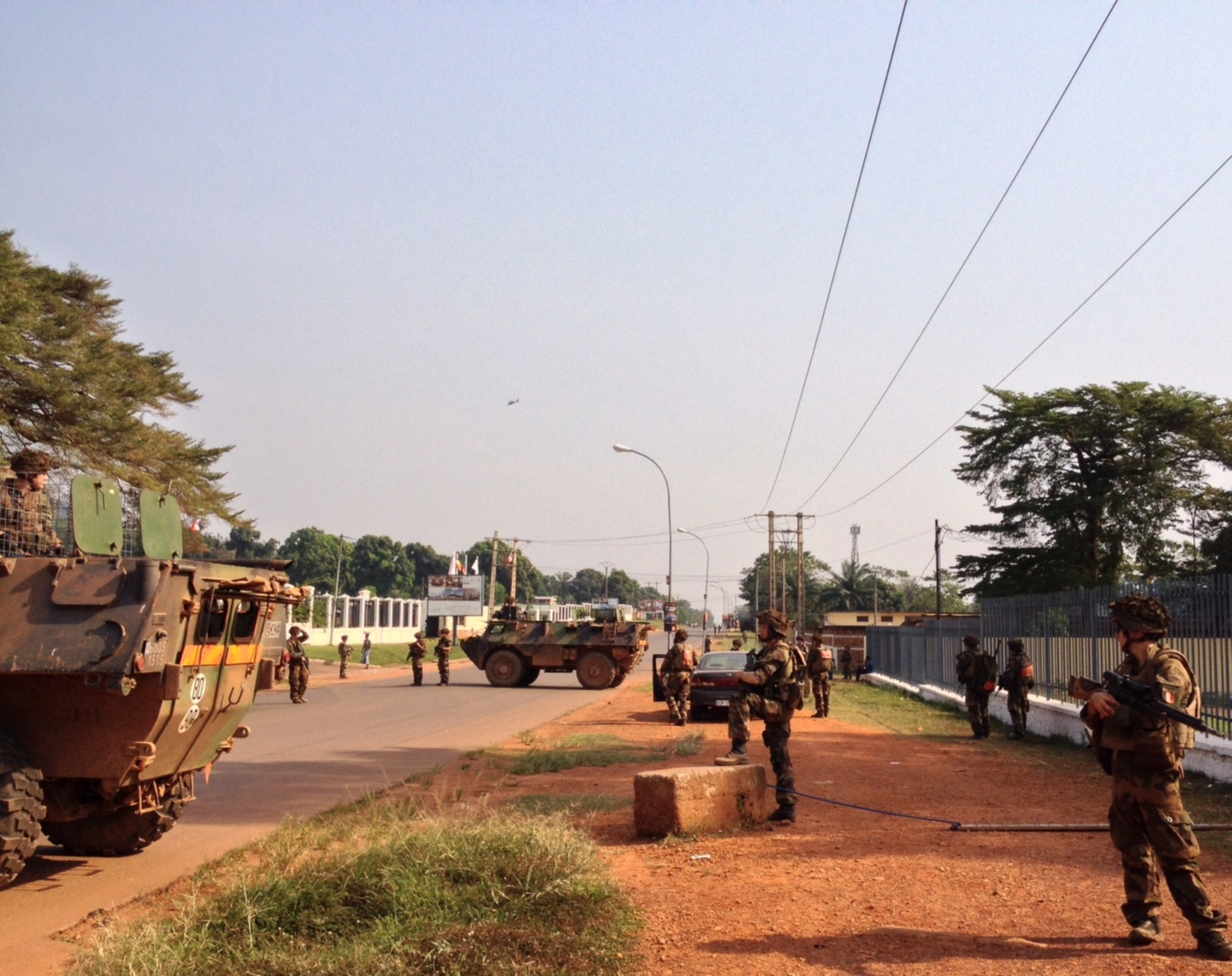
22 December 2013 in Bangui.

On 8 December 2013, Jean-Yves Le Drian, French Defence Minister, stated that operations would start the next day to disarm militias. He re-stated the three objectives of the French interventions: "bring about the necessary security to allow the flow of humanitarian aid, allow the African mission to intervene and put the democratic process back in place." (Note: instaurer un minimum de sécurité et permettre l'acheminement de l'aide humanitaire, permettre à la mission africaine d'intervenir et mettre en place un processus démocratique)

In the night of the 9 to 10 December, an incident between French forces and gunmen caused the death of two soldiers of the 8th RPIMa. According to the statement of the French Defence Ministry, soon before midnight, a section of the Sangaris Force was attacked at short range by men equipment with light arms, during a patrol in Bangui. The patrol replied in kind. During the exchange of fire, the Privates First Class Nicolas Vokaer and Antoine Le Quinio sustained serious injuries; they were immediately cared for by their comrades and evacuated to the frontline surgical bay of the French Defence Health service at M’Poko Airport, where they died of their injuries.

On the 10th, General Mahamat Saleh, formerly Chief of Staff of the Séléka forces, was killed by French soldiers in the Miskine neighbourhood, as his vehicle attempted to run a blockade. Two of his men were also killed, and the two others were wounded.

On 22 December, three men of the Séléka were killed by French soldiers during a disarmament operations. Afterwards, accusations were exchanged between the French and the Séléka as to who was responsible for the shots being fired. The French headquarter stated that their men had opened fire "twice during the day", the first time "again a group of half a dozen men, suspected to be ex-Séléka, who were about to use their weapons that they had pointed on our troops"; (Note: contre un groupe d'une demi-douzaine de personnes soupçonnées d'être des ex-Séléka, qui allaient faire usage de leurs armes qui étaient pointées contre nos troupes) the second incident had occurred against a sniper. According to an officer of the Séléka, Abacar Sabone, the three victims had been killed "as they were indeed armed, but had demonstrated no hostility against the French and were not using their weapons." (Note: alors qu'ils étaient armés, certes, mais ils n'avaient montré aucun hostilité envers les Français et n'ont pas fait usage de leurs armes) A few hours later, thousands of Muslims demonstrated to denounce the French intervention and accuse it of supporting the Christians and the Anti-balaka. In the morning of the next day, Christians demonstrated to support the French intervention and demand the departure of Michel Djotodia, of Séléka and of the Chadian and MISCA soldiers. After sustaining stoning, Chadian soldiers opened fire, killing one demonstrator and wounding another. The incident ended when French troops evacuated the victims.

=== Minimal security restored and increase of MISCA presence (January 2014) ===
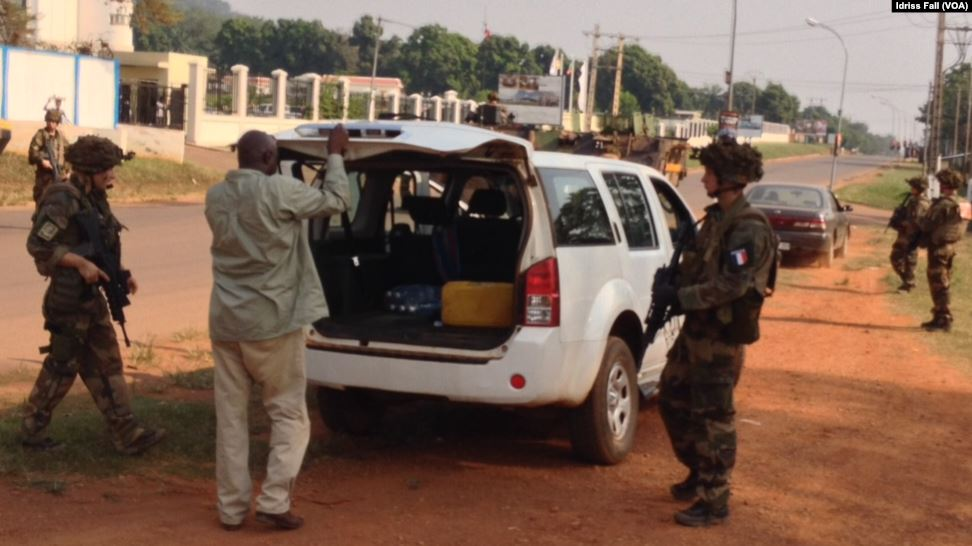
Checkpoint held by French troops of Opération Sangaris on 22 December 2013 in Bangui.

With the increased presence of the African force, with over 4400 men in January 2014, the cooperation between Sangaris and MISCA increased. The Sangaris Force conducted mixed operations, especially with the Burundi and Chadian battalions of MISCA. Meanwhile, Sangaris continued securing the surroundings of M’Poko Airport, where several thousands refugees had found shelter, to ensure sustainable air traffic.

On 10 January, in Ndjamena, President Michel Djotodia, close to Séléka, resigned. Soon afterwards, the Prime Minister, Nicolas Tiangaye, followed suit. The news of the resignation were celebrated all through Bangui. On 11 January, the former President went into exile in Benin.

On 12 January, in the Southern neighbourhood of Bimbo, Séléka and Anti-Balaka fraternised following a French mediation operation, and concluded a cease-fire in front of a cheering crowd. This did not, however, suffice to bring an end to the incidents and lootings that plagued the city.

On 15, on the North-Eastern side of the city, shots were exchanged between gunmen and French soldiers. Muslim civilians reported five killed by French troops, including two women and one teenager, which the French denied. In retaliation, Muslims attacked Christians during the evening. The next morning, the Red Cross reported retrieving four Christian bodies, killed with bladed weapons.

On 23 January, Muslim civilians demonstrated against the French military, again accusing them to side with the Christians. Some of the demonstrators opened fire on the French, whose return fire killed one man.

On 28 January, 300 Séléka soldiers were evacuated from Kasaï camp by Rwandese soldiers. On the same day, French troops were attacked by Séléka elements near RDOT camps, on the Northern side of the town, where around 1000 Séléka troops were stationed. The French replied in kind, using ERC 90 Sagaie wheeled tanks and killing a dozen Séléka fighters.

=== Securing and disarming militias (February and March 2014) ===
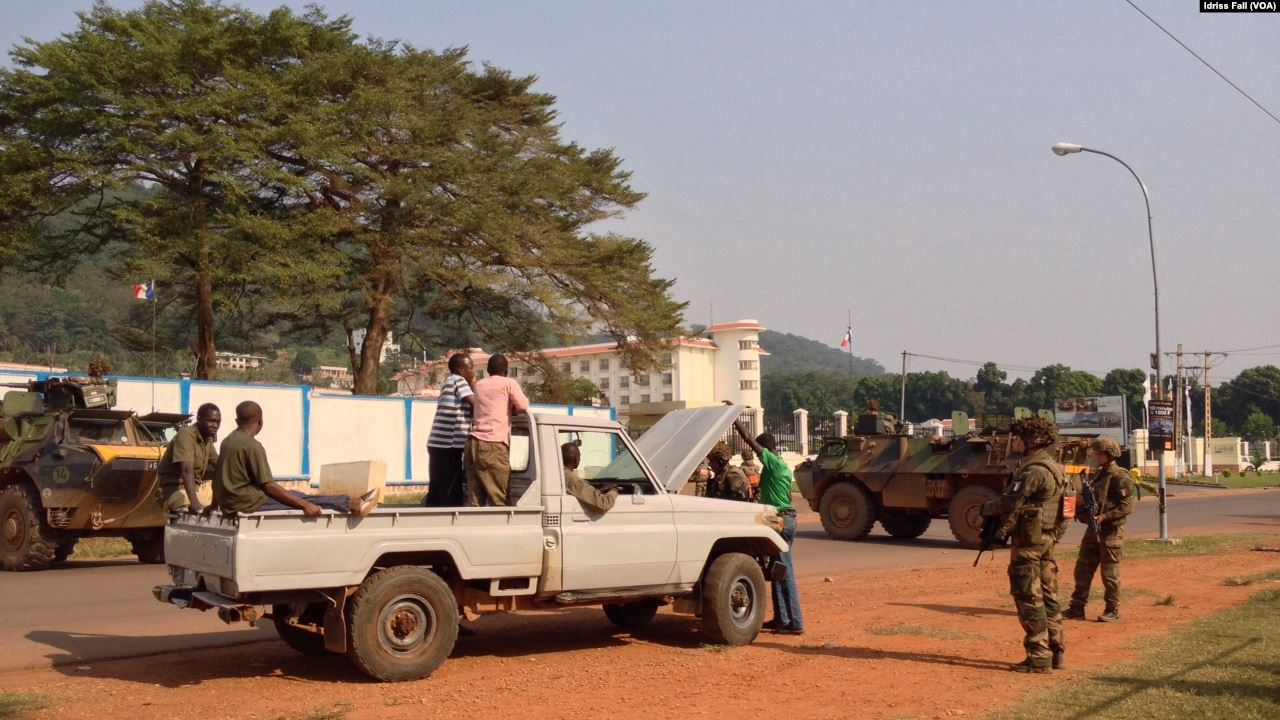
Checkpoint held by French troops of Opération Sangaris, on 22 December 2013 in Bangui.

On 20 February 2014, elements of the Épervier Force in Chad redeployed from N'Djamena to the Central African Republic to reinforce Sangaris. On 23 February 2014, an armoured vehicle sustained an accident on a laterite road near Bouar; the three-man crew was wounded, and one of them, a corporal of the Régiment d'infanterie-chars de marine, later died of the injuries sustained in the crash.

Despite efforts to disarm both anti-balaka and Séléka symmetrically, massacres occurred in the region of Lobaye, where anti-balaka assassinated Muslim civilians and Séléka disarmed by the French. Violence yielded an exodus of the local Muslim population. Saleh Dido, one of the last Muslims in Mbaiki and aid of the mayor for 4 years, declining to flee, was assassinated by anti-balakas.

In early 2014, the Muslim population was gradually escorted by the MISCA out of Bangui and fled to the North of the Central African Republic and to Chad. In early March, Under-Secretary-General for Humanitarian Affairs and Emergency Relief Coordinator Valerie Amos stated that the Muslim population in Bangui numbered only 900, while it had been estimated to between 130 000 and 145 000 before the conflict.

In March, several operations were implemented to disarm the Anti-balaka in Bangui. On 10 February, General Francisco Soriano stated

The people who call themselves Anti-balaka have become the main enemies of peace in the Central African Republic. They are the ones sigmatising communities, they are the ones aggressing the Sangaris Force. We should not contain them, but hunt them for what they are, that is outlaws and bandits.

On 15 February, 250 African and French soldiers conducted a large operation in the anti-balaka-held Boy-Rab neighbourhood. They arrested eight people, including four officers under Patrice Edouard Ngaissona; Ngaissona, however, managed to flee.

The Anti-balaka, split between their extremist and moderate factions, reacted in diverse ways, with some declaring themselves ready to surrender their weapons, while others went on attacking Muslim civilians. From this point on, they constituted an heterogeneous movement lacking a clear objective or leadership, and General Soriano:

Who are these "anti-balakas"? Who is their leader? What is their political message? What is their chain of command? Nobody knows. It is a galaxy on which it is impossible to put a face.

In late March, some anti-balakas attacked PK5 Market, where the last Muslims of Bangui had taken shelter. The MISCA and Sangaris forces repelled the aggressors, but several assassinations nevertheless took place. On 25 March, African and French soldiers themselves came under attack, killing eight anti-balaka when returning fire, according to local witnesses.

=== Third phase: helping MISCA installation (April 2014 - present) ===
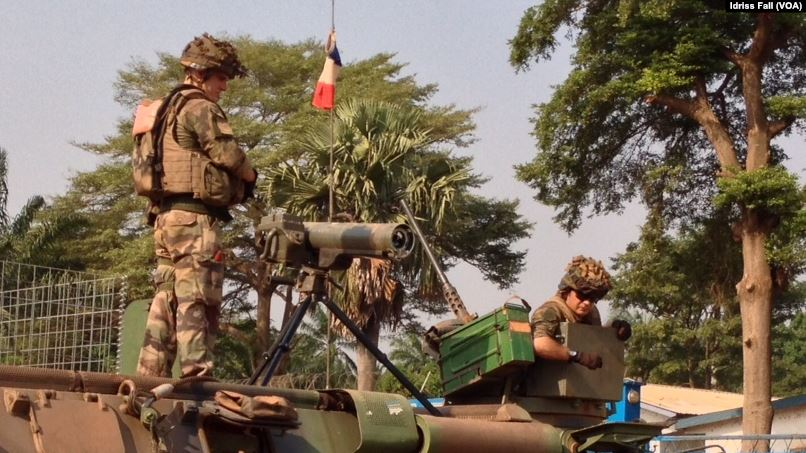
French soldiers in Bangui, 22 December 2013.

On 28 March, the Joint Tactical Group "Scorpion" (Note: GTIA ("groupement tactique interarmes") Scorpion) progressed towards Sibut, in the Eastern CAR. This new deployment continued the two previous phases in Bangui and in the West of the CAR. Its aim was to assist the installation of the MISCA in the Eastern CAR, help restore the authority of the State in the region, and have peace-keeping measures accepted and implemented.

From 13 to 16 April, infighting between Seleka and Anti-Balaka in Grimari killed several dozens. The French forces intervened and were in turn attacked by a 20-strong Anti-Balaka force; the return fire from the French killed five of the attackers.

ON 26 April, a Seleka group attacked Boguila, after killing several people on their way. The rebels killed 16 people in the hospital, including three employees of Médecins sans frontières. They then fell back on Bémal.

After these incidents, the Sangaris Force started to reconnoitre the area between Bossangoa and Paoua. On 5 May, in Boguila, the French sustained an attack from around 40 armed men, possibly Seleka from Bémal. The attack was repelled after three hours of combat, with 10 to 15 of the assailants killed and no casualty on the French side.

On 4 August, a fight broke out when a French recce mission encountered a 100-strong Seleka force near Batangafo. Benefitting from the support of Rafale planes and helicopters, the French prevailed without casualties on their side, while several Seleka were killed. Combat resumed the next day in Batangafo, where 60 Seleka were killed while two Congolese were killed and two French were wounded.

On 20 October, the Seleka massacred 14 people in Dekoa, including three women and four children. The French intervened soon after, killing at least six Seleka including a Colonel.

== Foreign support ==
Before the start of the operation, the French Ministry of Defence had demarched several European allies, as well as the US, to request support with air logistics, both strategic (long-range) and tactical (short-range). The British quickly announced their support, providing a number of Boeing C-17A Globemaster IIIs. Germany followed suit by committing a medical transport plane. On 13 December 2013, Belgium sent an Airbus A330 and deployed a Lockheed C-130H Hercules tactical transport. Other countries, such as Spain, Poland and the Netherlands, were also approached.

In December 2013, Morocco announced a 250-soldier deployment under the aegis of the UN Integrated Peacebuilding Office in the Central African Republic (BINUCA)

On 20 January 2014, the Foreign affairs ministers of the Council of the European Union unanimously approved the setting up of EUFOR RCA, an operational force led by the European Union. Decision to start the operation was approved on 1 April 2014, with initial operational capability reached on 30 April. France, as a Framework Nation in the Eurocorps, committed 350 personnel to the mission.

On 10 April 2014, the UN Security Council unanimously approved a peacekeeping force in the CAR, called MINUSCA, to put an end to the increasing violence between Christians and Muslims. MINUSCA replaced the 5600-strong MISCA from 15 September.

== International reactions ==
Public opinions and the media were split on the operation. The Algerian newspaper Liberté denounced Sangaris as a new instance of Françafrique policy, and described the operation as perceived "in Africa and elsewhere as manoeuver of France to affirm herself on the world stage". The British The Times, on the other hand, pronounced France "admirable" for her will to intervene and prevent a humanitarian catastrophe For the Burkinabé Observateur paalga, France would be accused of "neo-colonialism and of imperialism" when committing herself, and of "dereliction of duty to rescue" when remaining neutral, but is ultimately forced to act as the "Africa police" by the lack of implication of the States of the region.

=== Apprisal of the operation ===
In December 2013, French General Vincent Desportes stated on Radio France Internationale:

This is a much more complicated mission than in Mali, where the French armed forces had a simple mission, or at least a clear one, destroying a perfectly-identified and identifiable enemy. Here, we are talking of interposition between factions. Hence, we have nothing to destroy, no adversaries. The only adversary is disorder and massacres.

Former Prime Minister Dominique de Villepin called for an international intervention:

Let us not err in choosing our method. We have to state the obvious truth: France is the country in the worse position to act alone in the CAR. Choosing political transition and economical development as the aim of the intervention will amount to substitute ourselves to the Central-Africans for all great decisions as long as there will be no State. One does not build a State with fist blows. What this new policy is drawing is a benevolent re-colonisation. (...) France has a duty to act, but the interdiction to act alone. How can we break the dilemma? My mobilisation. We have been told as nauseam that if France does not interveene, nobody will do anything. The opposite it true. If France intervenes, nobody will move. Comfort will by maximal for the great powers (America, China, Russia, Europe) as much as for regional powers.

In an interview on 29 January, Peter Bouckaert, talking for Human Rights Watch, stated that the French had badly anticipated Anti-Balaka actions:

The French though they could limit themselves to disarm the former rebels in a mission that seemed simple in the beginning and promised to quick success. But nothing unfolded as foreseen and Operation Sangaris is now confronted to a bloodbath in the country. Faced with this new reality, the French military seems tetanised. When we notified them that Muslims would be massacred in the PK13 neighbourhood in Bangui, they replied that they did not wish to take part in the conflict! But preventing a massacre is not taking sides. Actually, it is the African forces of the MISCA that are taking most of the initiatives, but most of the risk as well. In particular, Rwandan, Burundi and Congolese troops, who managed to save people with lots of courage, while French troops often do not leave their armoured vehicles and seldom venture out of the main axis to see what is happening in popular neighbourhoods.

In early February, Peter Bouckaert stated that the French had "no strategy worthy of the name".

On the other hand, General Francisco Soriano, leader of Operation Sangaris, stated that the swiftness of the French deployment was "a real performance, that few other armies could match", and that the operation had managed to "prevent the outburst of violence that was foretold in the capital, where our efforts were focused (...) It is clear that we prevented a number of massacres."

The French ambassador in the CAR, Charles Malinas, stated that the operation had had a positive outcome, that normal life was being restored and that "everything is restarting in Bangui". He said that violence was "more and more limited and circumscribed to a few areas".

Peter Bouckaert, answered these statements by saying that "it is criminal to say that situation is stabilising when people are being lynched in the streets".

On 12 February, French general Dominique Trinquand, formerly chief of the military mission to the United Nations, stated on RFI:

The international community must react very quickly. France has done so, and a certain criticism has been voiced. I think it best to criticise those doing nothing than those taking action. And presently the planning of the operation of the European Union worries me considerably, because it is falling further and further behind schedule and does not at all match the speed that is necessary to react to violence.

On 29 March, in Geneva, Volker Türk, Director of International Protection at the United Nations High Commissioner for Refugees (UNHRC), recently back from the CAR, stated in Boda that "without Sangaris, is would be a massacre. Without Sangaris, the Muslim community would not exist any more.

According to Laurent Correau and Olivier Fourt, journalists at RFI, the outcome of the operation is "bitter-sweet". They stated that France had played an important stabilisation role, notably in Bangui and Bouar, and had also secured the supply route between Cameroon and Nagui, but had not managed to really disarm the Seleka and the Anti-Balaka. Furthermore, initially, the disarmament operation targeted mostly the Seleka, leading to a wave of popular violence against then defenceless Muslims. The French might initially have underestimated the threat posed by the anti-balaka.

=== Sexual abuse allegations ===
In April 2015, a leaked UN report revealed that human rights investigators had heard claims from children as young as nine, living in internal displacement camps, that they had been sexually exploited, including by rape and sodomy, by French soldiers in exchange for food. Further claims emerged in March 2016, including allegations that a French commander had tied up four girls, undressed, in a camp and forced them to have sex with dogs.

== French order of battle ==
=== French Air Force ===
- 6 Dassault Rafale from the French Air Force
- 2 Eurocopter AS550 Fennec helicopters (1 from Escadron d'Hélicoptères 5/67 Alpilles and 1 from Escadron d'Hélicoptères 3/67 Parisis)
- 2 Aérospatiale SA342 Gazelle helicopters from French Army Light Aviation
- 4 Aérospatiale SA330Ba Puma helicopters from French Army Light Aviation
- 25th Air Engineering Regiment

=== French Army ===
- 8th Marine Infantry Parachute Regiment
- 21st Marine Infantry Regiment
- 3rd Marine Infantry Parachute Regiment
- 6th Marine Infantry Battalion
- 1st Parachute Hussar Regiment
- 1st Parachute Chasseur Regiment

=== French Gendarmerie nationale ===
- Peloton de l'escadron de gendarmerie mobile 14/1 de Satory
- Elements of the GIGN
- Reinforcements from the Gendarmerie nationale and the 152nd Infantry Regiment since April 2014.

== Links and references ==
=== Bibliography ===
- Flichy de La Neuville, Thomas (December 2014). Centrafrique, pourquoi la guerre?. Éditions Lavauzelle. ISBN 978-2-7025-1603-4.

=== External links ===
- Centrafrique.com • Analyse et actualités concernant l'opération Sangaris
- Wagner, Daniel (14 January 2014). "France's 19th Century Foreign Policy Fails in 2014". The Huffington Post.
- (FR) CENTRAFRIQUE : LES ENFANTS DU CHAOS, reportage de Envoyé spécial.
- (FR) Centrafrique, au cœur du chaos, reportage de Spécial investigation.
- (FR) Piège en Centrafrique : Débat dans l'émission C dans l'air sur France 2.
- (FR) Le guêpier Centrafricain : Débat dans l'émission C dans l'air sur France 2.
- (EN) War in the Central African Republic, reportage de Vice.
- (EN) Deep divisions in the Central African Republic, reportage de Al Jazeera.
- (EN) Peace and Stability in the Central African Republic, débat de leaders religieux à l'Institut Brookings (Think Tank américain).
