= Jean Touzet du Vigier =

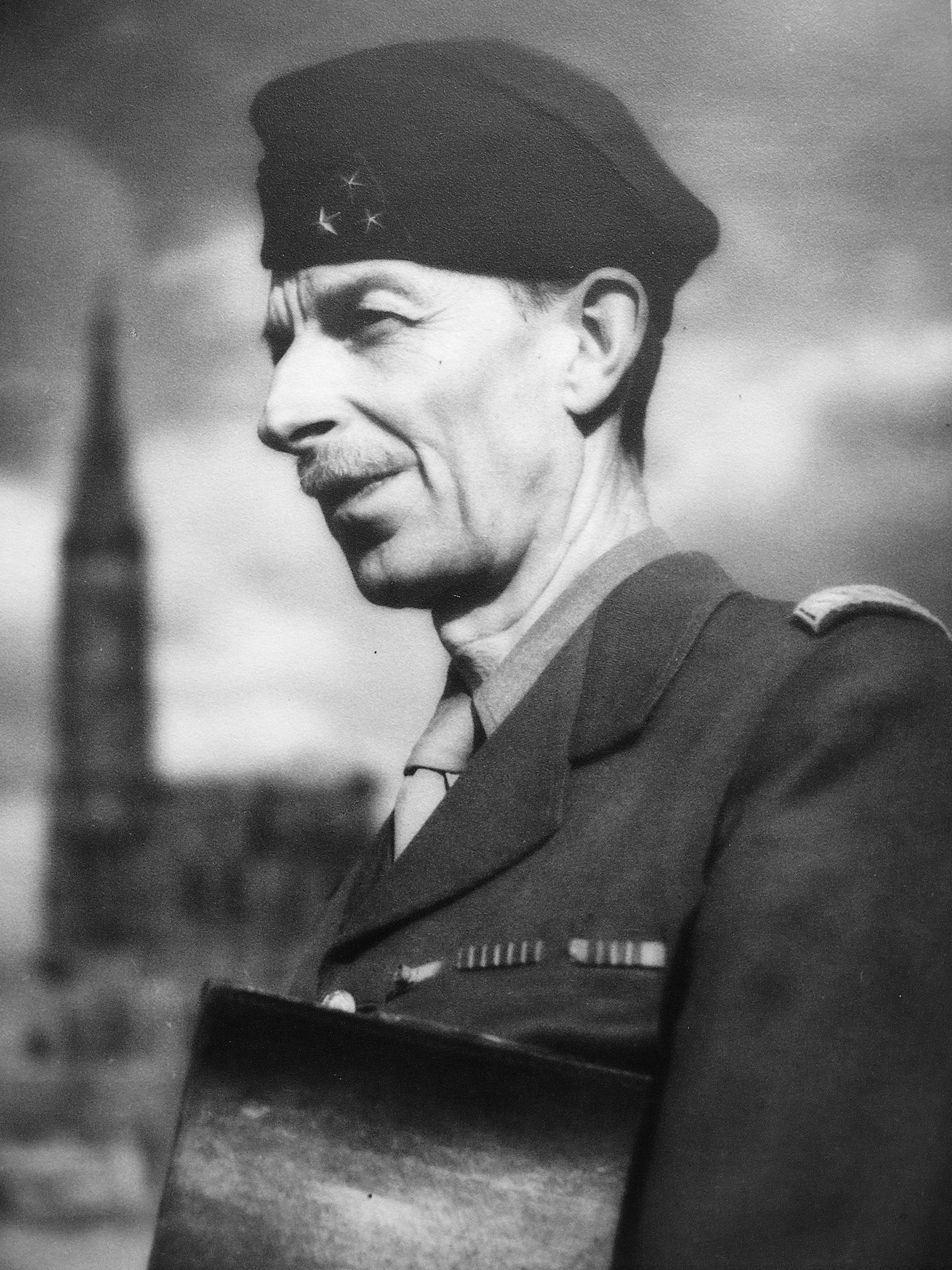
- General Jean Touzet du Vigier
- Born: 10 October 1888; Chambéry, France
- Died: 16 August 1980 (aged 91); Paris, France
- Military career
- Allegiance: French Third Republic 1913–1940; Vichy France 1940–1941 (Free France) Free French Forces 1941–1945; French Fourth Republic 1945–1947
- Branch: French Army
- Service years: 1913–1947
- Rank: Lieutenant General
- Commands: 2nd Armored Regiment; 1st Mechanized Brigade; 1st Armored Division; Garrison of Strasbourg; Assistant Chief of the General Staff
- Conflicts: World War I World War II; Battle of France; North African Campaign; Invasion of France; Battle of the Bulge
- Awards: Grand Cross of the Legion of Honor; American Red Cross of Merit; Distinguished Service Order
- Other work: Retired

Lieutenant General Jean-Louis-Alain Touzet du Vigier (French pronunciation: [ʒɑ̃ lwi alɛ̃ tuzɛ dy viʒje]; 1888–1980 was a French army officer during World War II and an advocate of military mechanization, particularly the motorization of the cavalry.

== Early life ==
Touzet du Vigier was born in Chambéry on 10 October 1888.

== Military career ==
In order to be accepted into the St. Cyr Special Military School, he served in the volunteers until 1913. He failed a medical examination, however, which prevented him from entering the school and was assigned to an infantry regiment instead. He managed to get the support of then-War Minister Millerand, a family friend, to get a transfer from the 33rd Infantry Regiment, though, and, after receiving his transfer, he was able to attend St. Cyr. He graduated before the start of World War I and eventually became a lieutenant in the 9th Cuirassiers, stationed in Noyon.

Due to the characteristics of World War I's Western Front, the 9th Cuirassiers were effectively forced to serve as infantry, fighting in the trenches against German military forces holding similar lines in France. By 1918, Touzet du Vigier had risen to the temporary rank of captain. He was then sent to join the 2nd Regiment of Chasseurs d'Afrique in Morocco, but stayed only a few months before being transferred back to St. Cyr as an instructor.

=== Interwar Period ===
In 1920, Touzet du Vigier was assigned to the staff of General Henri Niessel, the head of the French military mission to newly independent Poland, which was involved in a war with Bolshevik Russia. Touzet du Vigier's direct superior while training the Polish troops was future French president Charles De Gaulle.

Throughout the 1920s, Touzet du Vigier, now a permanent captain, served in the 18th Chasseurs and on various staffs, becoming a proponent of the motorization of cavalry. In 1932, as a military instructor and major, he joined the 18th Dragoon Regiment, which was located in Reims, where the 1st Light Mechanized Division was being raised. Touzet du Vigier, in his classes, began to speak more about the mechanization of the French army.

In 1936, he was reassigned to the Joint Tactical Studies Center at Versailles, where he was appointed head of the cavalry section. He continued to lecture others on the importance of mechanized cavalry, and, promoted in 1938 to lieutenant colonel, he was constantly reassigned to areas where his technical knowledge would prove useful.

=== World War II ===
By 1940, he had been given command of the 2nd Armored Cuirassier Regiment. His regiment attempted to block the German blitzkrieg in Belgium, but, like so many other French units, was forced to retreat. When France fell to the Nazis, Touzet du Vigier, now serving the Marshal Petain's Vichy regime, was chosen to head the cavalry department of the army headquarters in Versailles. However, Touzet du Vigier secretly collaborated with the French resistance. His superiors, who ignored his underground activities, sent him to Mascara, Tunisia, where he took command of a sub-division. When the Allies invaded Africa, Touzet du Vigier switched sides to that of De Gaulle's Free French.

Temporarily promoted to brigadier general, Touzet du Vigier took command of the 1st Mechanized Brigade and then, in 1943, of the 1st Armored Division. By now a major general, again temporarily, he served under the command of General Tassigny, the commander of the 1st French Army.

Touzet du Vigier's troops were some of the first to reach the Rhine. In January 1945, he was placed in command of the fortress-city of Strasbourg, which was threatened by a German offensive. The city did not fall, however, and Touzet du Vigier remained in this post until the end of the war.

Now a lieutenant general, Touzet du Vigier was appointed Assistant Chief of Staff to General de Tassigny and served in this position until 1947, when he reached the mandatory retirement age.

Touzet du Vigier died in Paris on 16 August 1980.
