= Ribbons of the French military and civil awards =

This is a list of the ribbons of the French military and civil awards.

== French national orders ==
Ribbon	Awards
	Ordre national de la Légion d'honneur
	Ordre de la Libération
	Ordre national du Mérite

== French ministerial orders ==
Ribbon	Awards
	Ordre des Palmes Académiques
	Ordre des Arts et des Lettres
	Ordre du Mérite Agricole
	Ordre du Mérite Maritime

== French military decorations ==
Ribbon	Award
	Médaille militaire
	Croix de guerre 1914–1918
	Croix de guerre 1939–1945
	Croix de guerre des Théâtres d'opérations extérieures
	Croix de la Valeur militaire
	Médaille de la Gendarmerie nationale
	Médaille de la Résistance
	Médaille des évadés
	Croix du combattant volontaire 1914–1918
	Croix du combattant volontaire 1939–1945; Croix du combattant volontaire (1983) + agrafes
	Croix du combattant volontaire de la Résistance
	Médaille de l'Aéronautique
	Croix du combattant
	Médaille de la Reconnaissance française
	Médaille d’Outre-Mer ex-médaille coloniale
	Médaille de la Défense nationale échelon or pour citation sans croix
	Médaille de la Défense nationale
	Médaille des services militaires volontaires
	Médaille des réservistes volontaires de défense et de sécurité intérieure
	Médaille d'Afrique du Nord (1997); Médaille de Reconnaissance de la Nation (2002)
	Médaille des blessés de guerre 1 star per wound

== Medals of Honor ==
Ribbon	Award
	Médaille d’honneur pour acte de courage et de dévouement
	Médaille d’honneur de l'Aéronautique
	Médaille d'honneur agricole
	Médaille d'honneur des Chemins de Fer
	Médaille d'honneur des Contributions indirectes
	Médaille d'honneur des Douanes
	Médaille d'honneur des Eaux et Forêts
	Médaille d'honneur de l'Enseignement du 1er degré
	Médaille de l'enfance et des familles
	Médaille d'honneur de la Jeunesse et des Sports (bronze level)
	Médaille d'honneur Pénitenciaire
	Médaille d'honneur des personnels civils relevant du ministère de la défense (Terre, Air et Mer)
	Médaille d'honneur de la Police nationale
	Médaille d'honneur des PTT
	Médaille d'honneur de la protection judiciaire de la jeunesse
	Médaille d'honneur des sapeurs-pompiers
	Médaille d’honneur du Service de Santé des Armées
	Medaille d'honneur de la sante et des affaires sociales
	Médaille de la sécurité intérieure
	Medaille d'honneur des services judiciaires
	Médaille d'honneur des Sociétés musicales et Chorales
	Médaille d'honneur des Transports routiers
	Médaille d'honneur du travail
	Médaille d'honneur des Travaux publics
	Médaille d'honneur du Tourisme

== French commemorative awards ==
Ribbon	Awards
	Médaille commémorative de Saint-Hélène (1857)
	Médaille commémorative de la campagne d'Italie (1859)
	Médaille commémorative de l'expédition de Chine (1860)
	Médaille commémorative de l'expédition du Mexique
	Médaille commémorative de la guerre 1870–1871
	Médaille commémorative de l'expédition du Tonkin (1885)
	Médaille commémorative de la campagne du Dahomey (1892)
	Médaille commémorative de Madagascar (1883); Médaille commémorative de Madagascar (1896)
	Médaille commémorative de l'expédition de Chine (1901)
	Médaille commémorative du Maroc (1909)
	Médaille Interalliée 1914–1918
	Médaille commémorative de la bataille de Verdun (1916)
	Médaille commémorative des batailles de la Marne (1914–1918)
	Médaille commémorative de la guerre 1914–1918
	Médaille commémorative de Syrie-Cilicie (1922)
	Médaille commémorative des Dardanelles (1926)
	Médaille commémorative d'Orient (1926)
	Médaille coloniale Médaille d’Outre-Mer
	Médaille des évadés
	Médaille commémorative des services volontaires de la France libre
	Médaille commémorative de la campagne d'Italie 1943–1944
	Médaille de la déportation pour faits de Résistance (1948); Médaille de la déportation politique (1948)
	Médaille de l'internement pour faits de Résistance (1948); Médaille de l'internement politique (1948)
	Médaille commémorative de la guerre 1939–1945
	Médaille de la France libérée (1944)
	Médaille commémorative des opérations de l'ONU en Corée (1952)
	Médaille commémorative de la campagne d'Indochine (1953)
	Middle East operations commemorative medal (1956)
	Médaille commémorative des opérations de securité et de maintien de l'ordre en Afrique du Nord (1958)
	Médaille commémorative française (1995)
	Medaille de la protection militaire du territoire

== Other awards ==
Ribbon	Awards
	Commemorative Cross of the Fourth Brigade of the Army of the Vosges
	Médaille de la Reconnaissance française
	Médaille des prisonniers civils, déportés et otages de la grandes guerre 1914-1918
	Médaille de la Fidélité francaise
	Médaille des victimes de l'invasion
	Médaille du patriote résistant à l'occupation des départements de Rhin et de Moselle 1939-1945
	Médaille du réfractaire (1963)
	Insigne des blessés civils 1 star per wound

== Order of precedence ==
Official list, dated June 19, 2003, signed by General Jean-Philippe Douin, Grand Chancellor of the Legion of Honour:

- Légion d'Honneur
- Croix de la Libération
- Médaille Militaire
- Ordre national du Mérite
- Croix de Guerre 1914–1918
- Croix de Guerre 1939–1945
- Croix de Guerre des Théâtres d'Opérations Extérieures
- Croix de la Valeur Militaire
- Médaille de la Gendarmerie Nationale (since décret n° 2004-733 of 26 July 2004)
- Médaille de la Résistance
- Palmes Académiques
- Mérite Agricole
- Mérite Maritime
- Arts et Lettres
- Médaille des Évadés
- Croix du Combattant Volontaire 1914–1918
- Croix du Combattant Volontaire
- Croix du Combattant Volontaire de la Résistance
- Croix du Combattant
- Médaille de la Reconnaissance Française
- Médaille de l'Aéronautique
- Médaille d'Outre-Mer (former colonial medal)
- Médaille d'Or de la Défense Nationale pour citation sans croix (since décret n° 2004-624 of 25 June 2004)
- Médaille de la Défense Nationale
- Médaille des Services Militaires Volontaires
- Honor medals of the different ministerial departments
- Médaille d'Afrique du Nord & Médaille de Reconnaissance de la Nation
- Commemorative medals and other equivalent

== See also ==
- Military awards and decorations of France
- Order (decoration)
- State decoration

== Sources ==
- Les décorations françaises ISBN 2-911468-99-6
- (in French) Site très complet traitant des décorations militaires et civiles françaises
