= Tonkin Expedition commemorative medal =

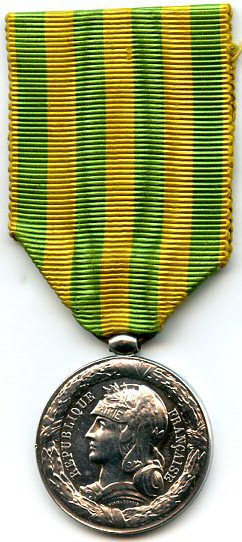
- Tonkin Expedition commemorative medal (obverse)
- Type: Medal
- Awarded for: Participation in the Tonkin campaign and Sino-French War, 1883–1885
- Presented by: France
- Established: 6 September 1885
- Final award: 1 October 1895

Highlights
- Total: 97,300
- Ribbon of the Tonkin Expedition commemorative medal

The Tonkin Expedition commemorative medal (French: Médaille commémorative de l'expédition du Tonkin) was awarded to all the French soldiers and sailors who took part in the battles of the Tonkin campaign and the Sino-French War between 1883 and 1885. The medal, decreed by a law of 6 September 1885, was minted at the Monnaie de Paris and distributed shortly before the Bastille Day parade on 14 July 1886 to around 65,000 soldiers and sailors. The medal was later awarded to participants in a number of earlier and later campaigns in Indochina, bringing the total number of recipients to 97,300.

== Law of 6 September 1885 ==
The decision to issue a commemorative medal was enshrined in a law of 6 September 1885, whose text read as follows:

Article 1. There is hereby established a commemorative medal for the Tonkin expedition and the military operations directed against China and Annam in 1883, 1884 and 1885.

Article 2. The medal shall be of silver, 30 millimetres in diameter. On one side it shall bear the effigy of the Republic, with the words République française, and on the other the legend Tonkin, Chine, Annam and in an inscription the names of the most glorious feats of arms. The medallion shall be enclosed within a laurel wreath.

Article 3. The persons awarded this medal shall wear it on the left side of the chest, attached to a ribbon half green and half yellow.

Article 4. The medal shall be bestowed by the President of the Republic on all the soldiers and sailors who took part in the Tonkin expedition and the military operations directed against China and Annam in 1883, 1884 and 1885, on the recommendation of the ministry responsible for their respective corps or service.

== Description of the medal ==
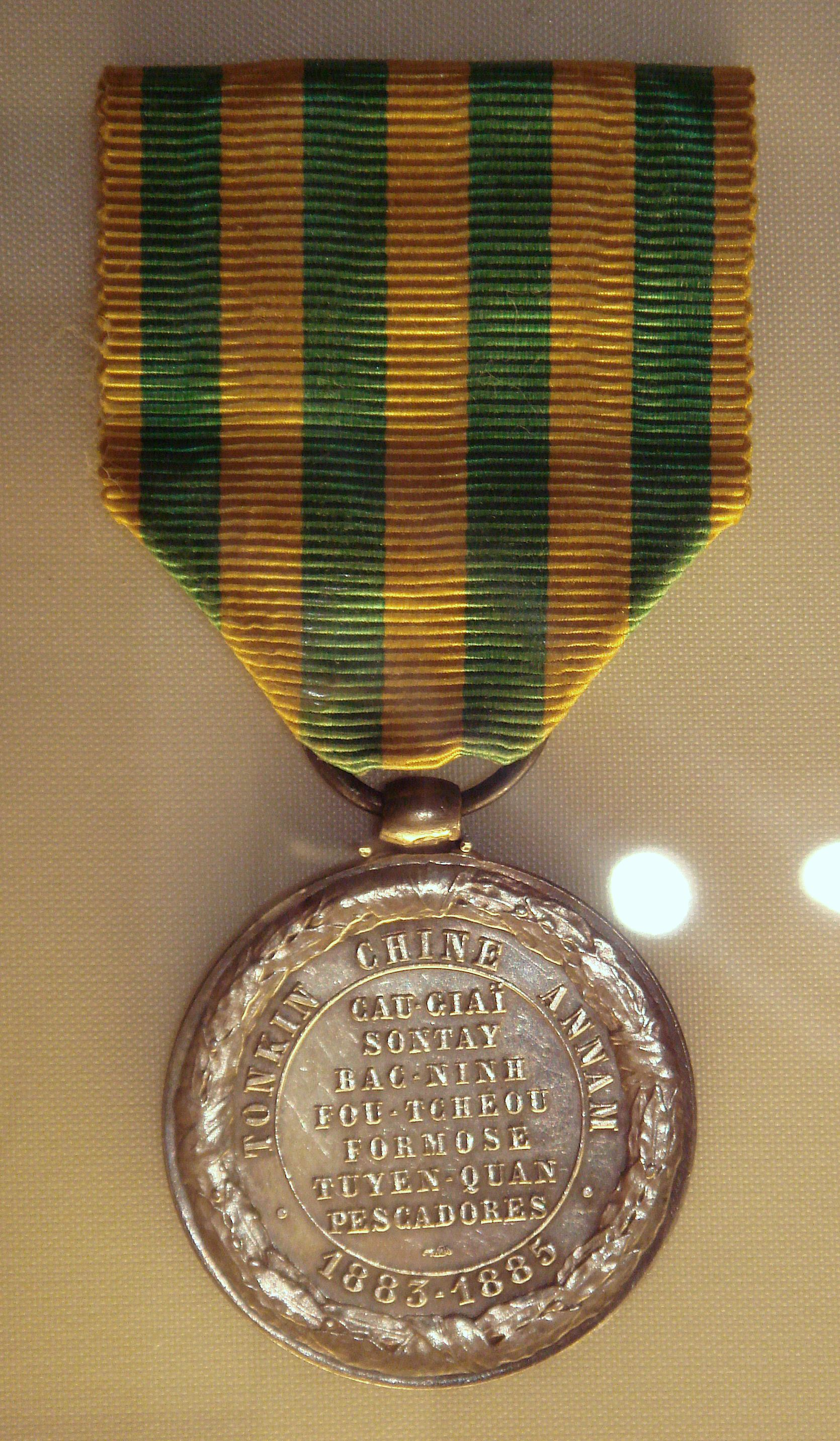
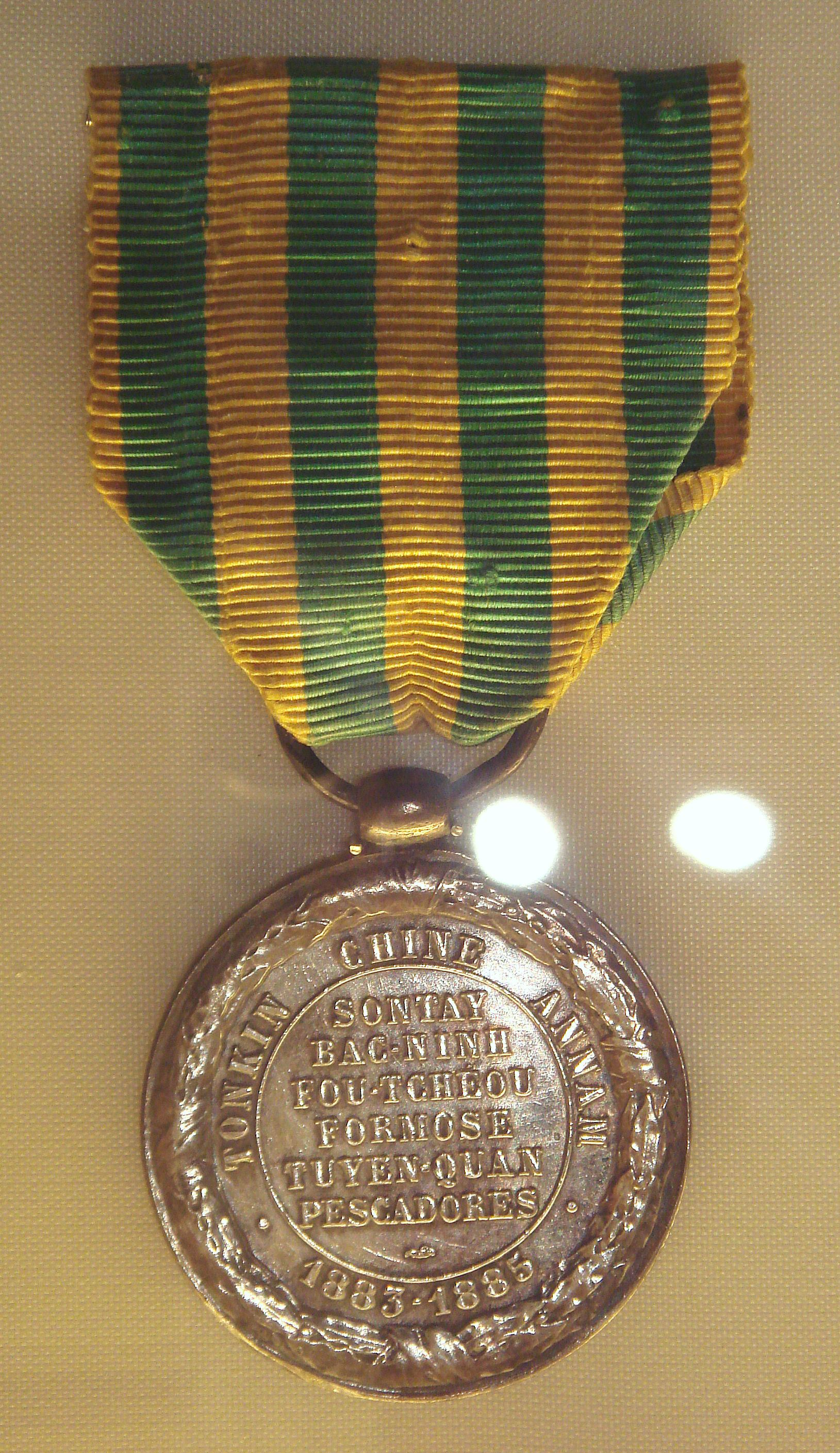
Left: Tonkin medal, navy issue, including the engagement of Cau-Giaï
Right: Tonkin medal, army issue, omitting Cau-Giaï

As stipulated in the law of 6 September 1885, the obverse of the medal features an effigy of the Republic and the words République française, enclosed within a laurel wreath. In accordance with convention, the Republic is represented as a helmeted young woman with the word patrie (motherland) inscribed on the visor of her helmet.

On the reverse of the medal are a list of some of the more notable engagements of the Tonkin Campaign and the Sino-French War. Two medal issues were made, one for the army and one for the navy and the troupes de marine. The navy issue medal includes the following names: Cau-Giaï, Sontay, Bac-Ninh, Fou-Tchéou, Formose, Tuyen-Quan, Pescadores. The army issue medal omits the name Cau-Giaï, as this engagement, a serious French defeat on 19 May 1883 in which Henri Rivière, the French commandant supérieur in Tonkin, was killed, was entirely a navy affair.

The names, given in chronological order, refer respectively to the Battle of Paper Bridge (19 May 1883), the Sơn Tây Campaign (December 1883), the Bắc Ninh campaign (March 1884), the Battle of Fuzhou (23 August 1884), the Keelung Campaign (August 1884–April 1885), the Siege of Tuyên Quang (November 1884–March 1885) and the Pescadores Campaign (March 1885).

The division of medals into “land type” and “sea type,” based on the indication “CAU-GIAI” on the reverse, is not confirmed by official decrees of the French government.

The medal ribbon, envisaged in the law of 6 September 1885 as half green and half yellow, was redesigned in the course of production, and the final version featured four green stripes on a yellow background.

The clasp is inscribed with the word Tonkin.

== Eligibility and distribution ==
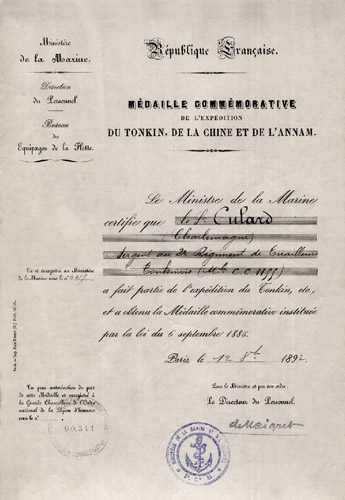
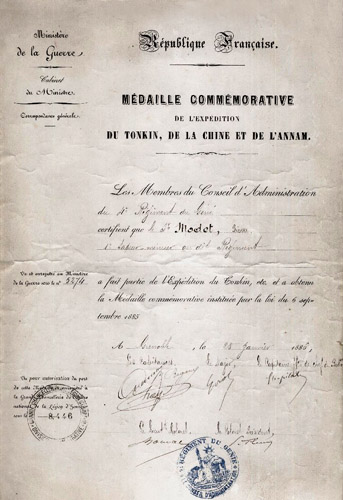
Diplomas issued by the navy ministry (left) and army ministry (right)

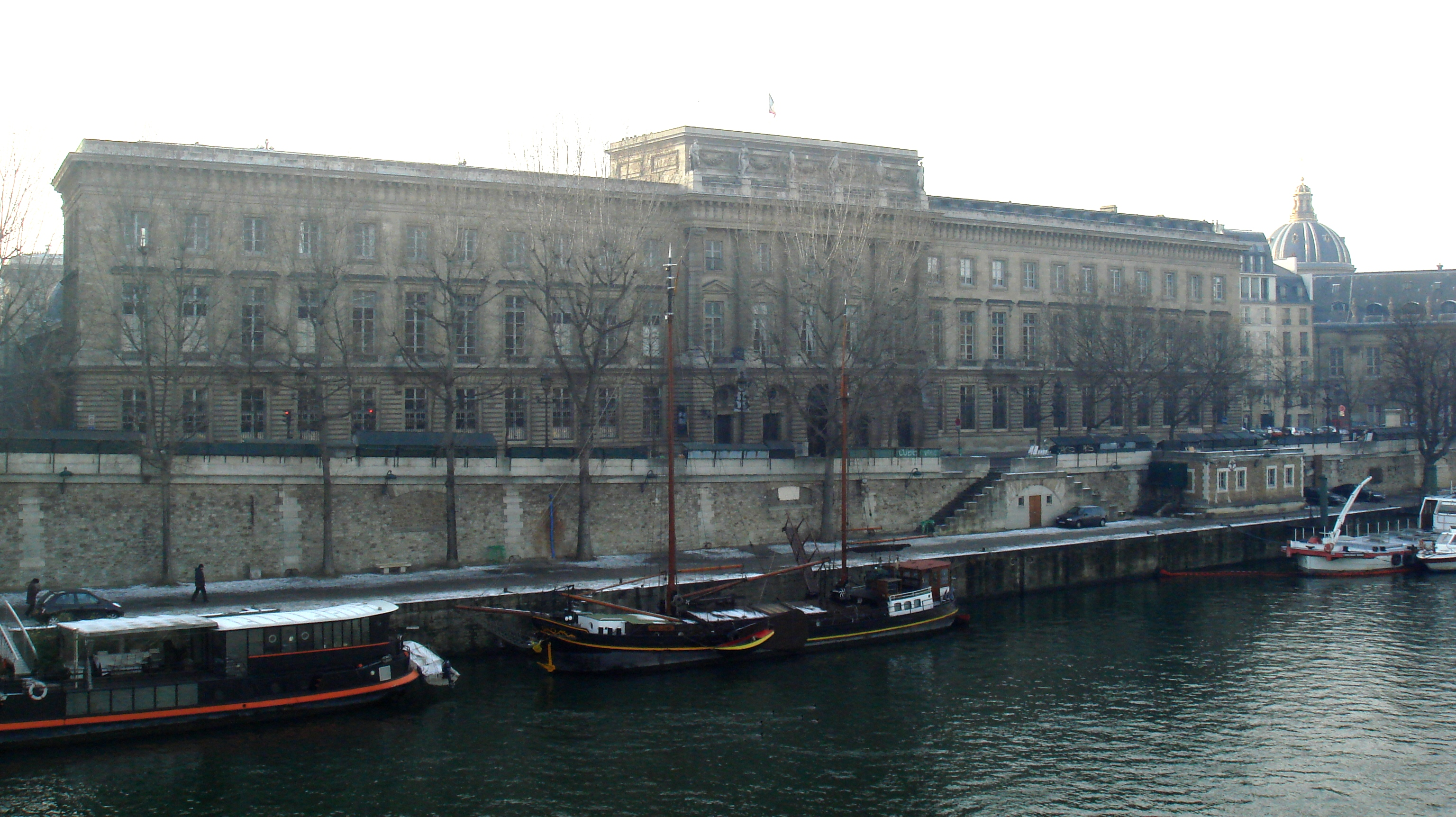
The Monnaie de Paris

The medal, minted at the Monnaie de Paris, was initially distributed to participants in the campaigns in Tonkin, Annam and China between 1883 and 1885. No distinction was made between combatants and non-combatants. Administrative and support staff, including cantinières and officials working in the treasury, postal and military telegraphy services, were eligible for the award of the medal. The medal was not awarded to participants whose service records were marred by serious military offences or habitual misconduct.

In the cases of men who had died on active service, the medal was awarded as a souvenir to a near relative (in order of preference the deceased man's eldest son, widow, father, mother or eldest brother).

Each medal recipient was also given a diploma issued by the navy ministry (Ministère de la Marine) or the army ministry (Ministère de la Guerre).

A law of 27 July 1887 extended the medal's distribution to servicemen who had taken part in various expeditions in Indochina since the end of the Sino-French War and to those who had fought in Tonkin under Francis Garnier in 1873 and in the early campaigns of Henri Rivière in 1882. The medal was eventually issued to all servicemen who had campaigned between 1885 and 1893 in Tonkin, Annam, Cambodia, Siam and the Upper Mekong, bringing the total number of recipients to 97,300.

== Controversies ==
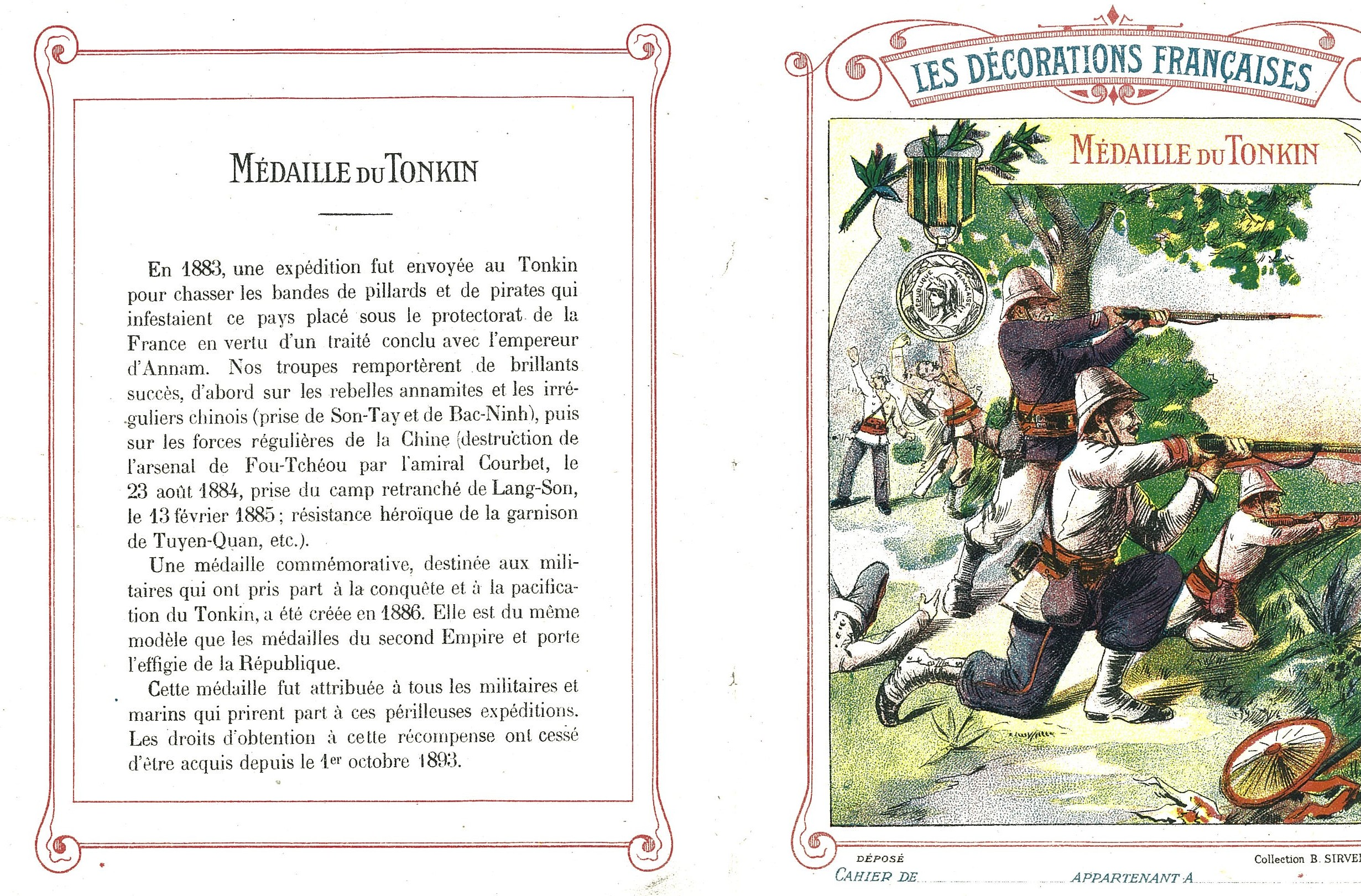
Educating the young: a French school notebook explains the medal's significance

The list of feats of arms commemorated on the reverse of the medal aroused comment. Although most of the engagements included were uncontroversial, the commemoration of the French defeat at the Battle of Paper Bridge raised some eyebrows. The government included this engagement as a tribute to the two pre-eminent martyrs of the French conquest of Tonkin, Henri Rivière and Francis Garnier. The battlefield of Cau-Giaï, where Rivière fell on 19 May 1883, was also the scene of the defeat and death of Francis Garnier ten years earlier, on 21 December 1873.

There were a number of puzzling absences from the list, including the battles of the Kep Campaign of October 1884 and the Lạng Sơn Campaign in February 1885. In both campaigns the Tonkin Expeditionary Corps inflicted a string of defeats on the Chinese. The decision not to commemorate the Lạng Sơn Campaign was taken because its gains were wiped out in March 1885 by the notorious Retreat from Lạng Sơn. Nevertheless, the omission angered many of the veterans who had taken part in the February campaign. Lieutenant Armengaud, a Foreign Legion officer, bitterly criticised this decision at the end of his book Lang-Son. In Armengaud's view, several of the February engagements (Dong Song, Pho Vy, Dong Dang) qualified for inclusion, as did the battles of Bang Bo and Ky Lua, fought around Lạng Sơn in late March 1885:

He regrets, however, along with everyone else who fought in the expedition against Lạng Sơn, that the defeats which ended it have so tarnished the laurels won in the numerous actions fought before 24 March that they have been judged unworthy to furnish a glorious name to engrave on the commemorative medal for the Tonkin campaign. Dong Song! Pho Vy! Dong Dang! Bang Bo! Ky Lua! There would have been no shortage of possible names!

The government's decision to issue the medal to every soldier and sailor who had fought in the Tonkin campaign and Sino-French War was also controversial. More than 65,000 servicemen (30,000 soldiers and 35,000 sailors) initially qualified for the medal, and its issue to such a large number of men was felt in some quarters to devalue its significance:

With the 500,000 francs that have been laid out for this valueless distinction we might instead have given the médaille militaire to three or four hundred brave men and done them true honour. That would have been little enough, and far less than their deeds deserved, but at least it would have been better than nothing. But the commemorative medal is nothing. Indeed, it is less than nothing, worse than nothing. It is a manifestation of that absurd species of egalitarianism which insists on cutting down the great to the same level as the small and rewarding equally those who exceeded their duty and those who shirked it.

== Notable recipients (partial list) ==
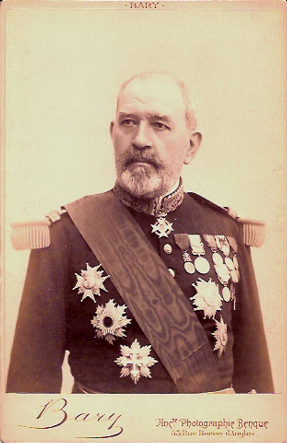
Admiral Henri Rieunier, a recipient if the Tonkin Expedition commemorative medal

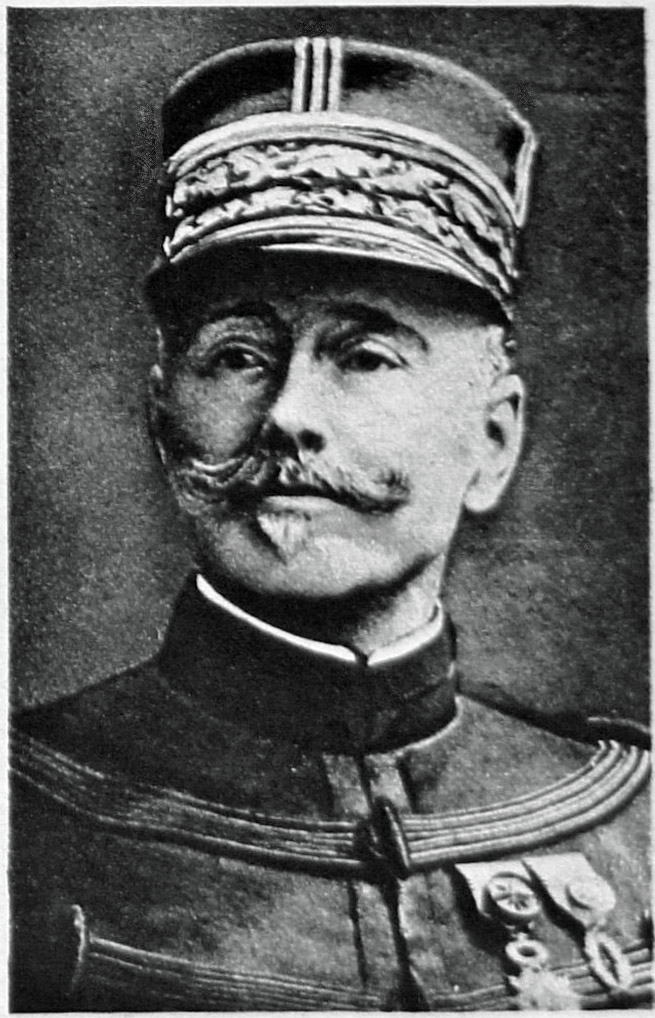
General Augustin Gérard, a recipient if the Tonkin Expedition commemorative medal

- General Georges Louis Humbert
- General Philippe Marie André Roussel de Courcy
- General Paul François Grossetti
- General Jean-Marie Brulard
- General Albert d'Amade
- Vice admiral Antoine Exelmans
- Vice admiral Édouard Pottier
- General Augustin Gérard
- General Joseph Joffre
- Admiral Henri Rieunier
- General Paul Chrétien
- General Jean Jules Henri Mordacq
- General Pierre-Guillaume-Paul Coronnat
- General Charles Alexis Vandenberg
- Enseigne de vaisseau Gustave Samanos

== See also ==
- Ribbons of the French military and civil awards
- Indochina Campaign commemorative medal: French campaign medal for the First Indochina War
- Commemorative medal of the 1860 China Expedition: French campaign medal for the Second Opium War
- 1901 China expedition commemorative medal French campaign medal for the Boxer Rebellion
