= Charles-Louis Du Pin =

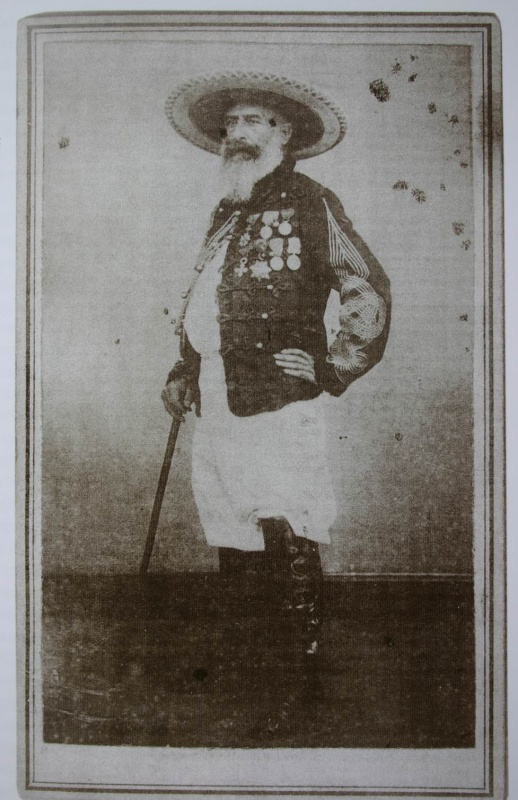
- Colonel Du Pin with his decorations
- Born: December 28, 1814; Lasgraisses, France
- Died: October 3, 1868 (aged 53); Montpellier, France
- Military career
- Conflicts: French conquest of Algeria; Crimean War; Second Italian War of Independence; Second Opium War; Second French intervention in Mexico

Charles-Louis Du Pin (December 28, 1814 – October 3, 1868) was a French military man. He participated in the Second French intervention in Mexico, where he reorganized the local militia.

== Biography ==
=== Family ===
Charles Louis Désiré Du Pin, also referred to as Dupin, was born on December 28, 1814, in Lasgraisses (Tarn), the son of Pierre Paul Charles Louis de Dupin (1769–1823), mayor of Lasgraisses from 1814 to 1825, and his wife, Marie-Sophie de Genton de Villefranche whom he had married on June 18, 1812, in Amarens (Tarn).

=== Background ===
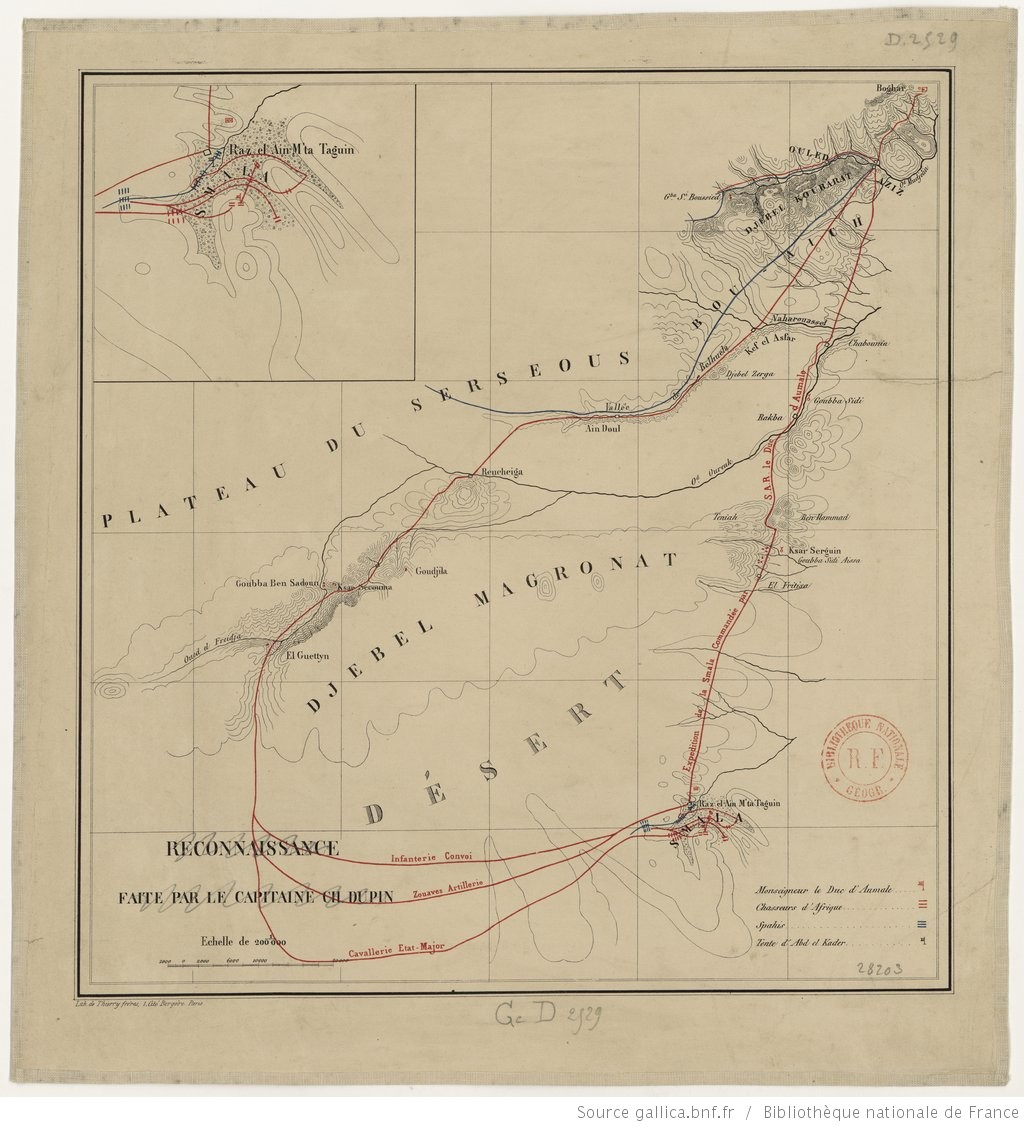
Map of the Algerian desert drawn by Du Pin

Du Pin obtained a baccalauréat in letters at the age of 17 and was sent to Paris to prepare himself to enter the competition of the École Polytechnique. He left the same school in 1836 with the rank of second lieutenant. Then he completed his training with a course at the Royal Staff Corps Demonstration School (école d'application du Corps royal d'état-major) from January 1, 1837. On January 23, 1839, he became lieutenant of the Staff Corps.

The following February 4, he was assigned to the 18th line infantry regiment. From March 1, he was employed as a topographer to collaborate on the creation of a military map of France, devoting himself to other maps of Algeria, China and Japan, which are still particularly appreciated today. Promoted to captain on December 2, 1842, on January 20, 1843, he was assigned to the 33rd line regiment.

=== Algerian Campaigns ===
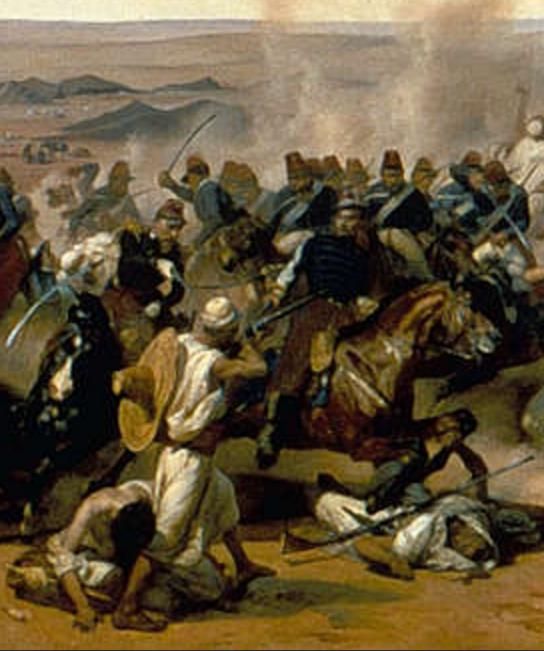
Captain Du Pin saves Lieutenant Colonel Morris from certain death, in Horace Vernet's painting The Battle of the Samala

On April 10, 1843, at the age of 29, Du Pin embarked with his regiment for Algeria where he took part, on May 16, 1843, in the Battle of the Smala; during the operation he saved Lieutenant Colonel Morris, commander of the 4th regiment of African hunters, from certain death and for this act he was cited by the Duke of Aumale who wanted him to be included in the painting of the battle made by Horace Vernet.

Du Pin returned to Algeria on December 20, 1843, and left again on January 20, 1844, remaining there for the next three years. He was cited a second time for praiseworthy actions by Marshal Thomas Robert Bugeaud on October 28, 1844, for the combat of Flissas El Bahr. He was made a knight of the Legion of Honor on November 27, 1844, and on April 5, 1845, he was assigned to the 2nd regiment of cuirassiers and then to the 1st regiment of African hunters. He was cited again by Colonel Camon on March 7, 1846, after the battle of Ben Nahr, and by General Joseph Vantini on March 13 after the battle of Mengren.

Returning to Algeria on April 2, 1847, Du Pin became a member of the 8th regiment of chasseurs on August 11. He was put on leave from March 31, 1848, and resumed his active service the following May 10, at the staff of the 5th infantry division of the Armée des Alpes. On November 11, 1848, he was appointed aide-de-camp to General Marey-Monge, commander of the 5th infantry division of the same army.

Again on leave since December 20, 1849, he resumed his service on February 5, 1850, with General Marey-Monge, who in the meantime had been appointed commander of the 13th military division in Clermont-Ferrand. Du Pin was promoted to the rank of chef d'escadron on December 22, 1851, and maintained his posts until June 26, 1852, when he was assigned to serve with General Lafontaine, as inspector general of infantry.

He took a leave of absence on December 31, 1852, and resumed his service on April 15, 1853, at the staff of the 10th division and on May 21, 1853, he was at the disposal of the governor general of Algeria. He took part in the expedition of the Zouaves of General Randon. His valuable service was rewarded with the cross of officer of the Legion of Honor on July 29, 1854, and a new citation on August 13 of that year.

=== Crimea and Italy Campaigns ===
Du Pin was assigned to General du Midi's staff on July 29, 1854, and on November 9, 1854, he was assigned to the staff of the 1st Infantry Division, which later became the 7th Division, and then to the 4th Division of the 2nd Army Corps of the Army of the Orient, with which he took part in the Crimean War. He then served as chief of staff of the 1st division (from August 4, 1855) of the 2nd corps of the Armée d'Orient, chief of staff of the 1st division of the 3rd corps of the Armée d'Orient (September 8, 1855), chief of staff of the 7th infantry division of the 2nd corps of the Armée d'Orient (October 20, 1855); on September 19, 1855, at the age of 40, he was promoted to lieutenant colonel.

Returning to the Crimea, he was appointed on June 20, 1856, as chief of staff of the 3rd Infantry Division of the Army of Lyon shortly afterwards took to Corsica as chief of staff of the 17th Military Division (November 29, 1856).

Beginning April 27, 1859, Du Pin took part in the Italian campaign as chief of staff of the cavalry division of the 1st Corps of the Army of Italy, fighting in the Battle of Magenta.

=== Chinese Campaign ===
Back in France, Du Pin became chief of staff of the 7th Division stationed at Besançon (September 8, 1859). He was appointed on November 17, 1859, head of the topographical service of the military expeditionary corps in China, embarking the following December 5 to the East; he took part in the Battle of Palikao and was cited by General de Montauban for the taking of the forts of Peiho on August 21, 1860.

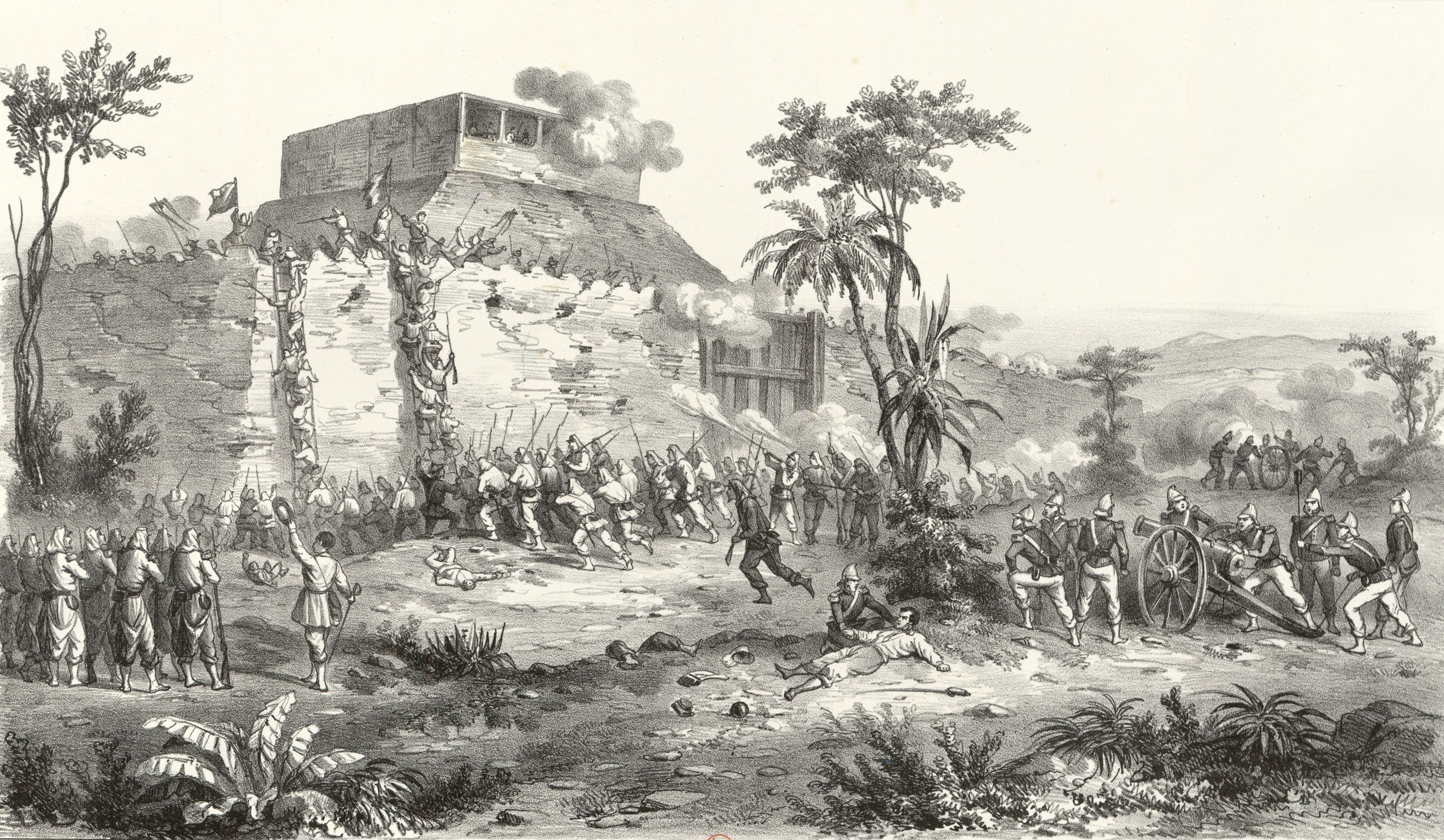
The taking of the forts of Peiho on August 21, 1860

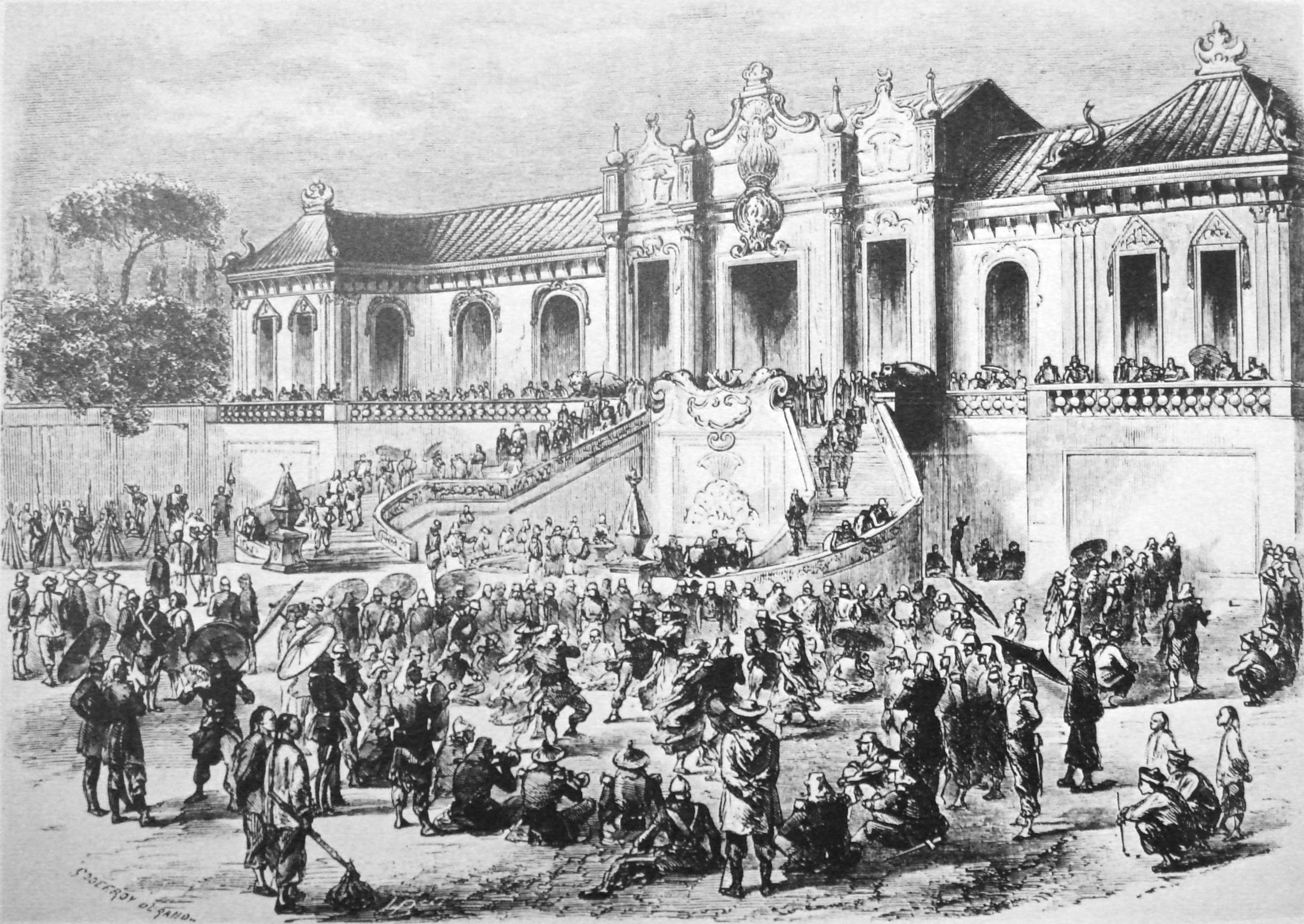
The looting of the old summer palace by Franco-British troops in 1860 during the Second Opium War.

On October 6, 1860, he scaled the walls of the Old Summer Palace in Beijing with a few men, allowing the Franco-British to take possession of the structure without a fight. He was promoted to colonel on November 7, 1860. In January 1861, he obtained the authorization to go to Japan for a journey of four months with the journalist Antoine Fauchery; of this stay, he will write a book published in 1868 entitled: Le Japon : mœurs, coutumes, description, géographie, rapport avec les Européens. Du Pin was himself an amateur photographer and took several photographs upon his arrival in China, particularly in 1860 in Shanghai, Chefoo (Yantai), Tientsin (Tianjin), Tung-Chow (Tongzhou) and Beijing. About thirty of his photographs were published in 1861 by photographer Ferrier & Soulier.

Returning to France, he was confirmed as a colonel on January 4, 1861, and temporarily assigned to the military depots in Paris on August 7, 1861. Under the pseudonym of Paul Varin he published a book entitled Expédition de Chine. On January 11, 1862, he was assigned as chief of staff of the 4th Army Corps in Lyon.

Du Pin made people talk about him again for the sale of many Chinese objects he himself had looted from the Ancient Summer Palace of Beijing, a sale he was forced to do because of financial difficulties. The auction was held at the hôtel Drouot. This fact raised a considerable amount of accusations against General Charles Cousin-Montauban, Comte de Palikao who had directed the operations of the plundering, causing scandal even to Napoleon III himself. Marshal Adolphe Niel had warned Randon "of the deplorable effect of such a sale on public opinion", in particular because it seemed improper that a militar, however esteemed, should profit from what to all intents and purposes had been a war plunder executed without respect. Napoleon III decided to write to Colonel Du Pin so that he would retire from his activities.

=== Mexican Campaign ===
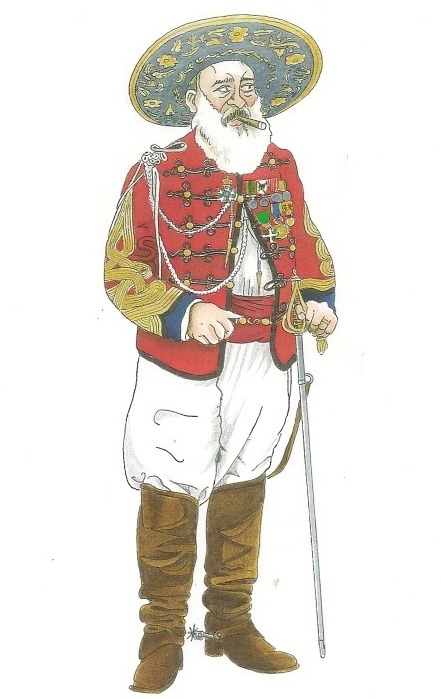
Colonel Charles Du Pin, commander of the contra-guérillas

Du Pin decided to reenlist and take part in the Second French intervention in Mexico. He secured a ministerial dispensation (August 15, 1862) that recalled him to the army and was assigned to the staff of General Juan Almonte, in charge of the organization of the Mexican imperial army; on August 25, he embarked for Mexico in Cherbourg. Desolated by General Almonte's total lack of interest in the organization of the Mexican army, Du Pin decided to join the staff of General Forey, commander of the French Expeditionary Corps, at Orizaba.

The local insurgency was so vigorous that the Expeditionary Corps struggled to hold the area of Puebla; a private counter-guerrilla unit with international recruits was organized, starting from the port of Veracruz. However, this operation lacked coordination on the part of the Swiss Charles de Stoëcklin and the other French officers in charge of the region. This situation led General Forey to look for a French officer capable of developing, unifying and coordinating the different existing counter-guerrillas.

General Forey chose Colonel Du Pin for this purpose and gave him the command of the counter-guerrilla warfare in Tierra Caliente, an area between La Soledad and Veracruz, with the mission of pursuing the Tierra Caliente bandits to the bitter end and purge the country. To accomplish this mission, on February 20, 1863, Du Pin resumed service at the headquarters in Veracruz and took command of his troops, a group of semi-regular units comprising a hundred men of different nationalities, equipped and paid by the French army. Under his leadership the group reached 650 units, which allowed him to have at least two mixed columns of 250 men each, as well as reserve troops. This new organization of the guerrilla army allowed the French to adequately control the southern part of Veracruz, and Du Pin, from March 1863, launched a surprise attack with his men against the center of Mexican guerrilla warfare, Tlalixcoyan, 80 kilometers from his base. After the destruction of Danjou Company at Camerone on April 30, 1863, Du Pin kept his garrison at La Soledad. Placed in an area particularly exposed to the raids of Mexican Colonel Milán and Colonel Camacho's National Guard of Jalapa, he managed in June 1863 to temporarily occupy Huatusco, one of the bases of the enemy guerrillas. On June 28, 1863, his men managed to put the Mexican troops who had taken part in the Battle of Camerone to flight, and Du Pin was hailed as the "Avenger of Camerone."

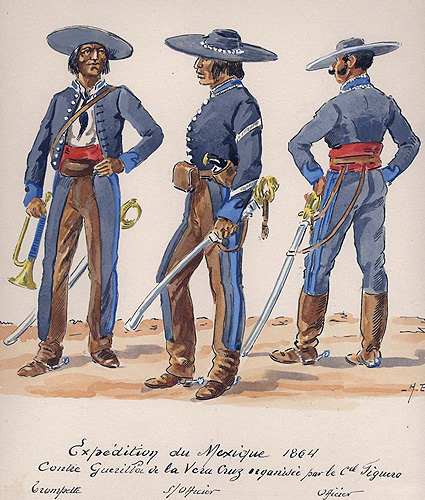
The counter-guerrilla warfare – the Veracruz expedition of 1864

In December 1863, despite a few flashes of brilliance such as the attack on Colonel Ferrerer's convoy, the Mexican guerrillas were forced to abandon their intentions around Veracruz. Galvanized by his early successes, Du Pin was appointed on April 6, 1864, governor of Tampico and the coastal province of Tamaulipas. On April 11, he left the city to face the brigades of Generals Pavon and Carvajal who, with 1200 men, laid siege to Temapache, held by Colonel Llorente and 300 Mexicans allied with the French. The column of counter-guerrillas, although inferior in number to the attackers, succeeded in reaching the rear of Pavon and Carvajal and broke the siege. On April 18, Du Pin with an assault succeeded in dispersing the forces of the two Mexican brigades in San Antonio.

With the pacification of the area south of Tamaulipas, Du Pin was able to focus on the reorganization of his corps of volunteers, bringing it to an effective number of 1000 in addition to 500 regular units. Benito Juárez's troops had the so-called corps of Los diablos colorados ("the colored devils") because of the red color of their jackets as well as the cavalrymen of the 1st squadron of Los camiceros colorados.

Two months later, Du Pin planned a new operation against the guerrillas west and north of Tampico, clashing with the guerrillas of General Casato and Lieutenant Colonel Perez, as well as General Pavon's brigade under the orders of Colonel Mascarenas during two skirmishes near Planteadores on July 7, 1864, and at Tantima on July 30. In August, the French troops could control a territory of 10,000 km2 with 1500 men thanks to the lightness of the columns organized by Du Pin and their flexibility of use. To better control and defend all areas, Du Pin decided to create local detachments, the first of which was established in May 1864 in Tampico under the orders of Mexican Colonel Prieto with two companies of 123 men each, based on the local fort.

The superior generals gave Du Pin carte blanche in view of the successes he had achieved, but this meant that the French counter-guerrilla troops took control of several economic circuits and the main trade routes in Tamaulipas, which generated a series of illicit deals, particularly in the trafficking of arms and ammunition. Obviously, then, the favorable treatment received made Du Pin attract the jealousies of other officers of the French expeditionary corps in Mexico.

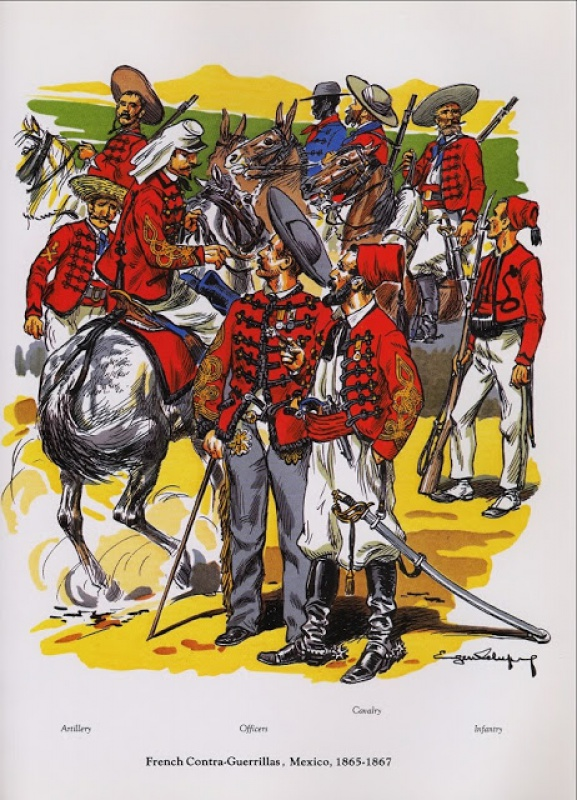
French counter-guerrillas in Mexico 1865–1867

Du Pin also employed among his troops, as auxiliaries, many local Indians which provoked the indignation of several Mexicans and French in his retinue. The band of soldier-brigands under Du Pin's command, his thick white beard and his striking and bizarre Mexican-Hungarian uniform with his pistols in his belt, became a distinctive feature of the French campaign in Mexico in those years. On the territories controlled by his men, Du Pin issued decrees signed Governor Charles Du Pin.

However, Du Pin also distinguished himself for his hasty methods, in particular for the application of local methods of execution that were judged improper by European soldiers, such as burying prisoners with only their heads protruding and having them loaded by running horses. He also used to physically eliminate citizens suspected of collaborationism, as well as being guilty of the burning of several villages. The authorities of the Mexican revolutionary government put a price on his head of 100,000 francs, but all was in vain. Serving the cause of Emperor Maximilian I of Mexico, he soon decided to close the military operations in the area and in April 1865 he returned to France, being replaced by Captain Ney d'Elchingen. On December 26, 1864, he obtained the commendation of the Legion of Honor.

Upon his return to France, however, he was accused of having made his fortune illegally in Mexico as well as of having diverted for himself the funds destined to his corps of soldiers. Even though it is undeniable that Du Pin made his fortune in Mexico, he was able to bring indisputable results to France from a military point of view, even if at the same time in his homeland a press campaign began to attack him and his work, in particular for the barbaric ways of his administration. Du Pin was relieved of the accusations, but came out discouraged and therefore asked Napoleon III to be sent back to Mexico. Appreciating the commitment of the soldier, the sovereign placed him at the disposal of Marshal Bazaine without, of course, consulting the latter, who was obviously disappointed to have Du Pin among his men because there was bad blood between the two. In January 1866, the homme terrible landed in Veracruz, Mexico, but this time Bazaine refused to welcome him. Du Pin ended up being replaced, this time definitively, at the head of the counter-guerrillas by Gaston De Galliffett.

=== Last years ===
Made available on March 25, 1867, he was nevertheless rewarded for his efforts with the appointment, the following August 16, to the role of chief of staff of the cavalry division of the 4th army corps and then, from August 27, chief of staff of the 10th military division stationed in Montpellier.

He died the following year, on October 3, 1868, of meningitis, at the age of fifty-four, at the Hôtel-Dieu Saint-Éloi in Montpellier.

General Du Barail, in his work Mes Souvenirs, described his distinctive appearance:

Fu una specie di condottiero del XVI secolo, un capitano di ventura coi capelli bianchi, superbo alla testa dei suoi "bambini sperduti" [...] Mi sembra ancora di vederlo davanti agli occhi, con l'uniforme eclatante e bizzara che aveva adottato: un dolman rosso, aperto sul davanti, con una camicia di flanella ornata di cinque galloni d'oro da colonnello, con dei nodi ungheresi sulle due maniche; una grande culotte bianca sino alle ginocchia ed un sombrero messicano color grigio chiaro, dai bordi piatti, decorato come la mitria di un vescovo, guarnito con ciondoli, il tutto bordato di fili d'oro.

He was a sort of condottiero of the 16th century, a white-haired captain of fortune, proudly leading his "lost boys" [...] I can still see him before me, wearing the striking and bizarre uniform he had adopted: a red dolman open at the front, with a flannel shirt adorned with five golden galloons, with Hungarian knots on the sleeves; white breeches down to the knees; and a light gray Mexican sombrero with flat edges, decorated like a bishop's mitre, trimmed with pendants, the whole thing bordered in gold threads.

His manuscript entitled Historique de la contre-guérilla des terres chaudes du Mexique (1865) is preserved today at the Service historique de la Défense, with the photographs he took.

== Honors ==
=== French honors ===
Commendatore dell'Ordine della Legion d'onore – ribbon for ordinary uniform

Commendatore dell'Ordine della Legion d'onore

Commendatore dell'Ordine della Legion d'onore – ribbon for ordinary uniform

Commendatore dell'Ordine della Legion d'onore

Medaille Commémorative de la Campagne d'Italie de 1859 – ribbon for ordinary uniform

Commemorative medal of the 1859 Italian Campaign

Medaille Commémorative de la Campagne d'Italie de 1859 – ribbon for ordinary uniform

Commemorative medal of the 1859 Italian Campaign

Médaille commémorative de la expedition de Chine – ribbon for ordinary uniform

Commemorative medal of the 1860 China Expedition

Médaille commémorative de la expedition de Chine – ribbon for ordinary uniform

Commemorative medal of the 1860 China Expedition

Médaille commémorative de la expedition in Mexique – ribbon for ordinary uniform

Commemorative medal of the Mexico Expedition

Médaille commémorative de la expedition in Mexique – ribbon for ordinary uniform

Commemorative medal of the Mexico Expedition

=== Foreign honors ===
Ufficiale dell'Ordine dei Santi Maurizio e Lazzaro (Regno di Sardegna) – ribbon for ordinary uniform

Order of Saints Maurice and Lazarus (Italy)

Ufficiale dell'Ordine dei Santi Maurizio e Lazzaro (Regno di Sardegna) – ribbon for ordinary uniform

Order of Saints Maurice and Lazarus (Italy)

Cavaliere di IV classe dell'Ordine di Medjidié (Impero ottomano) – ribbon for ordinary uniform

Order of the Medjidie (Ottoman Empire)

Cavaliere di IV classe dell'Ordine di Medjidié (Impero ottomano) – ribbon for ordinary uniform

Order of the Medjidie (Ottoman Empire)

Medaglia d'argento al valor militare (Regno di Sardegna) – ribbon for ordinary uniform

Silver Medal of Military Valor (Kingdom of Sardinia)

Medaglia d'argento al valor militare (Regno di Sardegna) – ribbon for ordinary uniform

Silver Medal of Military Valor (Kingdom of Sardinia)

Medaglia inglese della Guerra di Crimea (Regno Unito) – ribbon for ordinary uniform

Crimea Medal (UK)

Medaglia inglese della Guerra di Crimea (Regno Unito) – ribbon for ordinary uniform

Crimea Medal (UK)

== Bibliografia ==
- F. Choisel, Dictionnaire du Second Empire, Fayard, 1995
- "mémoires". L'intervention française au Mexique (in French). Vol. Tome I. Paris: Émile Nourry. 1911.
- "mémoires". L'intervention française au Mexique (in French). Vol. Tome II. Paris: Émile Nourry. 1911.
- "mémoires". L'intervention française au Mexique (in French). Vol. Tome III. Paris: Émile Nourry. 1911.
- "Le colonel Charles Louis Désiré Du Pin". La formation d'un officier atypique au XIX siècle (in French). Riveneuve éditions. 2011.
- "Notes sur l'histoire du Mexique". Le Général Miguel Miramon (PDF) (in French). Rome: Edoardo Perino. 1886.
- Sebastian Dobson; Charles du Pin (2011). "A French Photographer in Japan". PhotoResearcher. No. 15. Vienne: Société européenne de l'histoire de la photographie. ISSN 0958-2606. Archived from the original on November 11, 2021.
- Mes souvenirs (in French). Vol. Tome I. E. Plon, Nourrit. 1897.
- Mes souvenirs (in French). Vol. Tome II. E. Plon, Nourrit. 1898.
- Mes souvenirs (in French). Vol. Tome III. E. Plon, Nourrit. 1898.
- "mœurs, coutumes, description, géographie, rapports avec les Européens". Le Japon (in French). A. Bertrand. 1868.
- "Le Colonel Du Pin". De Québec à Mexico, souvenirs de voyage, de garnison, de combat et de bivouac (in French). Montréal: Duvernay, Frères et Dansereau. 1874. pp. 231–242.
- Mémoires d'un chef de partisans de Vera-Cruz à Mazatlan (in French). Paris: Tolra. 1894.
- "une approche du concept de forces spéciales". La contre-guérilla du colonel Du Pin au Mexique (in French). Cahiers du CEHD. 2001.
- "souvenirs des Terres chaudes (2ª edizione)". La contre-guérilla française au Mexique (in French). Paris: Librairie internationale. 1869.
- "souvenirs des Terres chaudes". La contre-guérilla française au Mexique (in French). Vol. Tome 59. Paris: Revue des Deux Mondes. 1865. pp. 691–737.
- "souvenirs des Terres chaudes". La contre-guérilla française au Mexique (in French). Vol. Tome 61. Paris: Revue des Deux Mondes. 1866. pp. 738–775, 966–1011.
- "souvenirs des Terres chaudes". La contre-guérilla française au Mexique (in French). Wikisource.
- "Le colonel Charles-Louis Du Pin (1814–1868), un intellectuel baroudeur". L'expédition au Mexique (in French). Vol. 2. Le Briquet. 2000.
- "récit politique et militaire". Expédition du Mexique, 1861–1867 (in French). Paris: J. Dumaine. 1874.
- La contre-guérilla du colonel Du Pin au Mexique (1863–1865) (in French). Vol. 1. Revue historique des Armées. 1977. pp. 29–40.
- "DU PIN (Charles Louis Désiré), 1814-1868, colonel". Dictionnaire du Second Empire (in French). Paris: Fayard. October 1995. p. 460. ISBN 2-213-59281-0.
- "MEXIQUE (l'expédition du)". Dictionnaire du Second Empire (in French). Paris: Fayard. October 1995. pp. 814–821. ISBN 2-213-59281-0.
- Expédition de Chine (in French). Paris: Lévy frères. 1862.
- "Souvenirs de ma vie (1837–1908)". Carnet de la Sabretache (in French). No. 374. Paris: Berger-Levrault & Cie. 1935. pp. 33–74.
