= Jean-Marie Brulard =

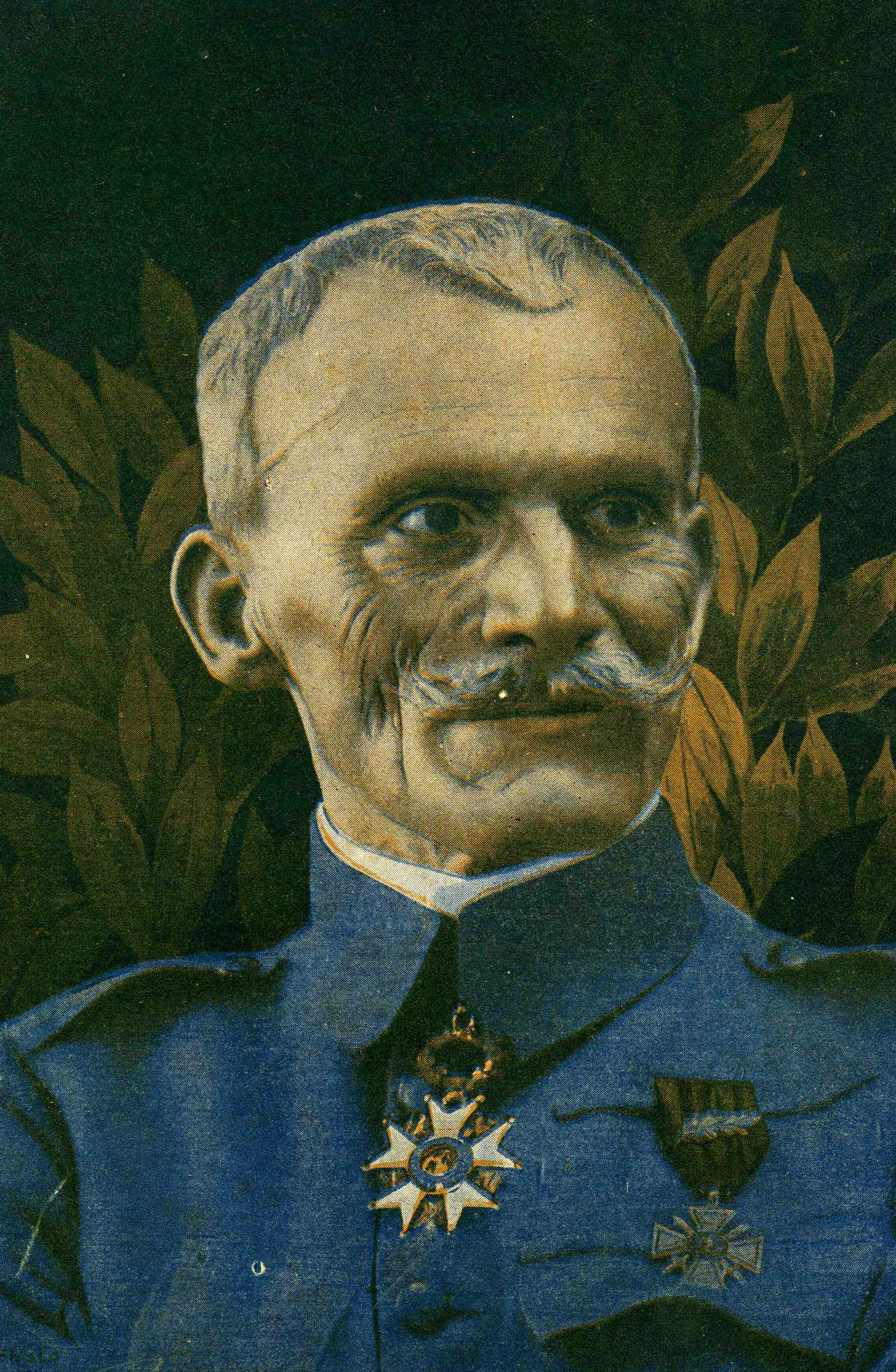
- Born: 1 March 1856; Besançon, Doubs, France
- Died: 19 November 1923 (aged 67); Nanterre, Hauts-de-Seine, France
- Education: École spéciale militaire de Saint-Cyr
- Military career
- Allegiance: France
- Branch: French Army
- Service years: 1876 – 1919
- Rank: Général de Division
- Conflicts: Sino-French War; Second Madagascar expedition World War I: German invasion of Belgium; First Battle of Ypres; Gallipoli campaign

Jean-Marie Joseph Armand Brulard (1856–1923) was a French Général de Division who participated in World War I. He spent an extensive part of his military career in Tunisia, Tonkin, Algeria, Madagascar, Morocco and the Dardanelles. He was once told by a superior that: "Son nom est un drapeau." ("His name is a flag"). He was also known for being a recipient of the Grand Cross of the Legion of Honour.

== Military career ==
Brulard was born on 1 March 1856 in Besançon, Doubs. After graduating from the École spéciale militaire de Saint-Cyr as a lieutenant, he was assigned to the 24th Battalion of Alpine Chasseurs, he was captain of the 1st Foreign Regiment, lieutenant colonel of the 4th Tunisian Tirailleurs Regiment and a colonel of the 2nd Foreign Infantry Regiment. After being promoted to brigadier general in 1912, he went on a business trip to Morocco to reorganize the army there.

Just after the French entry into World War I, on 19 September 1914, he was given command of the 2nd Infantry Division. He was promoted to général de division on 25 October 1914, and participated on the Gallipoli campaign the following year.

Brulard became available again on 16 July 1915, and was given command of the 17th Colonial Infantry Division and on 29 February 1916 he was available again. On 23 May 1916 he commanded the 157th Infantry Division and the 131st Infantry Division on 28 January 1917. After being placed on the reserves on 10 June 1917, Brulard was available again by 1 September 1918. On 6 November 1918 he was the military governor of the Russian base at Laval due to the ongoing Russian Civil War.

He retired on 15 August 1919, and died at the age of 67 on 19 November 1923 in Nanterre.

== Legacy ==
Several streets bear his name, notably in Besançon, his home town, as well as in Lyon.

== Awards ==
- Legion of Honour, Grand Cross (January 9, 1918)
- Legion of Honour, Grand Officer (October 28, 1915)
- Legion of Honour, Commander (July 11, 1912)
- Legion of Honour, Officer (July 12, 1905)
- Legion of Honour, Knight (July 10, 1894)
- Croix de guerre 1914–1918
- Colonial Medal (Tonkin and Morocco variants)
- 1914–1918 Inter-Allied Victory medal
- Tonkin Expedition commemorative medal
- Madagascar commemorative medal (1896)
- Morocco commemorative medal (Casablanca clasp)
- Commemorative Medal of the 1914–1918 War
- Dardanelles campaign medal

=== Foreign Awards ===
- Morocco: Order of Ouissam Alaouite, Grand Officer
- Tunisia: Nichan Iftikhar, Grand Officer
