= 1901 China expedition commemorative medal =

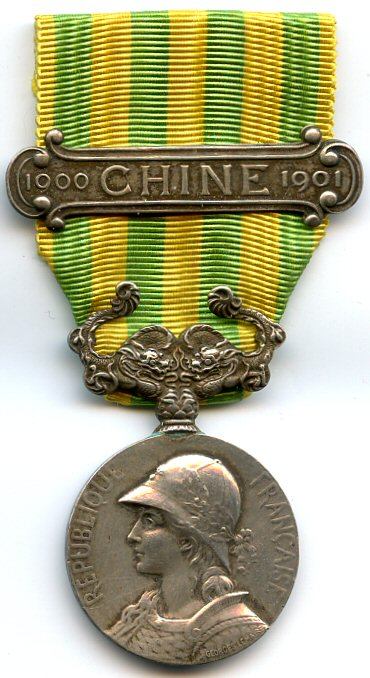
- 1901 China expedition commemorative medal
- Type: Campaign Medal
- Awarded for: Relief of the legations in Peking
- Presented by: France
- Eligibility: French citizens
- Campaign: Boxer Rebellion
- Clasps: 1900 CHINE 1901
- Established: 15 April 1902

Highlights
- Total: ~34,500
- Ribbon of the 1901 China expedition commemorative medal

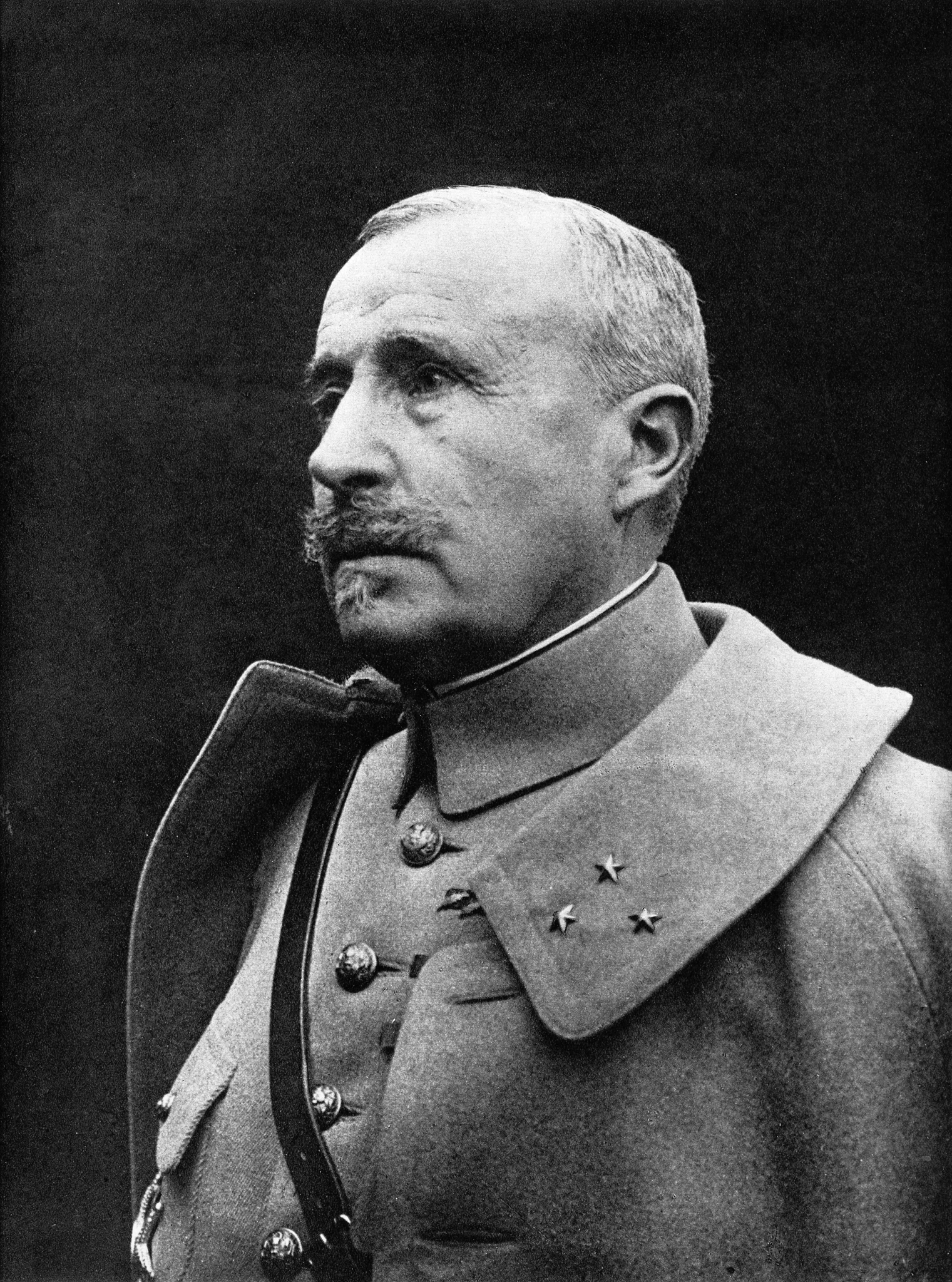
General Robert Nivelle, a recipient of the 1901 China expedition commemorative medal

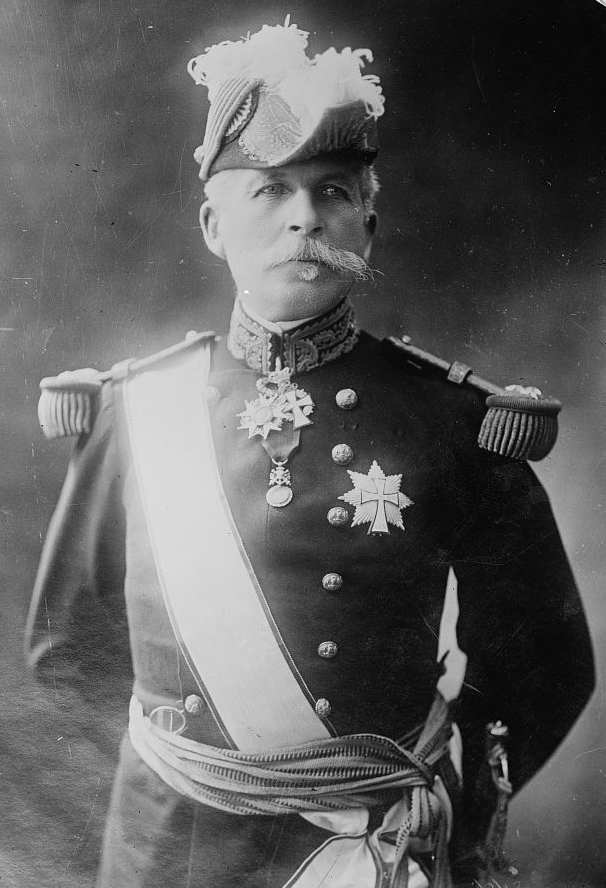
General Albert d'Amade, a recipient of the 1901 China expedition commemorative medal

The 1901 China expedition commemorative medal (French: "Médaille commémorative de l'expédition de Chine (1901)") was a French military campaign medal established by the law of 15 April 1902 to recognize service in China in 1900 and 1901 during the Boxer Rebellion.

In May 1900, an uprising throughout Northern China threatened the interests of nations with established concessions in major cities and leased territories in the Empire of China. This hostility against these powers was mainly driven by a secret nationalist and xenophobic group called "the Society of Righteous and Harmonious Fists", hence the name "Boxers" given to its members.

It was decided by eight major powers (Germany, Austria, United States, France, Britain, Italy, Japan and Russia) to establish an international army of 150,000 men under the supreme command of German Field Marshal Count von Waldersee to rescue their besieged compatriots in Peking and put down the rebellion in the provinces. Allied troops entered Peking on 14 August 1900 but a peace treaty with China was only signed on 7 September 1901.

== Award statute ==
The 1901 China expedition commemorative medal was awarded by the President of the French Republic, based on the recommendation of the minister under which the potential recipient served, to all officers, sailors and soldiers having participated in the French expedition to China during the following time periods:

- for the personnel under the War Department, to all those who served in China between 30 June 1900 and 8 August 1901;
- for the personnel under the Navy Department,
  - concerning members of crews, to those who were in service in theater between 30 May 1900 and 31 December 1901 who received an indemnity for service in China;
  - concerning officers, military functionaries or agents that did not figure on crew rosters, to those who received an indemnity for service in China covered in the decree of 4 August 1900 or an indemnity for expenses granted prior to 1 September 1900, in accordance with the order of the admiral commander in chief of the Far East naval division.

It was also awarded, on the recommendation of the Minister for External Affairs, to the French civilians who took part in the defence of the legations in Peking.

The law of 15 April 1904 added as potential recipients of the 1901 China expedition commemorative medal, the officers, sailors and soldiers, destined to take part in the expedition, who disembarked in the Tonkin between 30 June 1900 and 8 August 1901 on the condition they did not already receive the Colonial Medal for the same time period.

== Award description ==
The 1901 China expedition commemorative medal was a 30mm in diameter circular silver medal. The obverse bore the relief image of the effigy of the "warrior republic" in the form of the left profile of a helmeted woman's bust, the helmet being adorned by a crown of oak and laurel leaves. On either side, the relief inscription along the circumference "RÉPUBLIQUE FRANÇAISE" (English: "FRENCH REPUBLIC"). The reverse bore a pagoda surrounded with military and naval articles or war. The ribbon's suspension loop was adorned with two Chinese dragons.

The medal hung from a 36 mm wide silk moiré yellow ribbon with four 4 mm wide equidistant green vertical stripes.

== Noteworthy recipients (partial list) ==
- General Robert Nivelle
- General Maurice Bailloud
- Vice admiral Antoine Exelmans
- General Albert d'Amade
- Admiral Raoul Castex
- General Émile Edmond Legrand-Girarde
- General Charles Louis Joseph Belhague
- General César Alix
- General Baron Charles Pierre Corvisart

== See also ==
- Commemorative medal of the 1860 China Expedition: French campaign medal for the Second Opium War
- Tonkin Expedition commemorative medal: French campaign medal for the Sino-French War
