= Commemorative Cross of the Fourth Brigade of the Army of the Vosges =

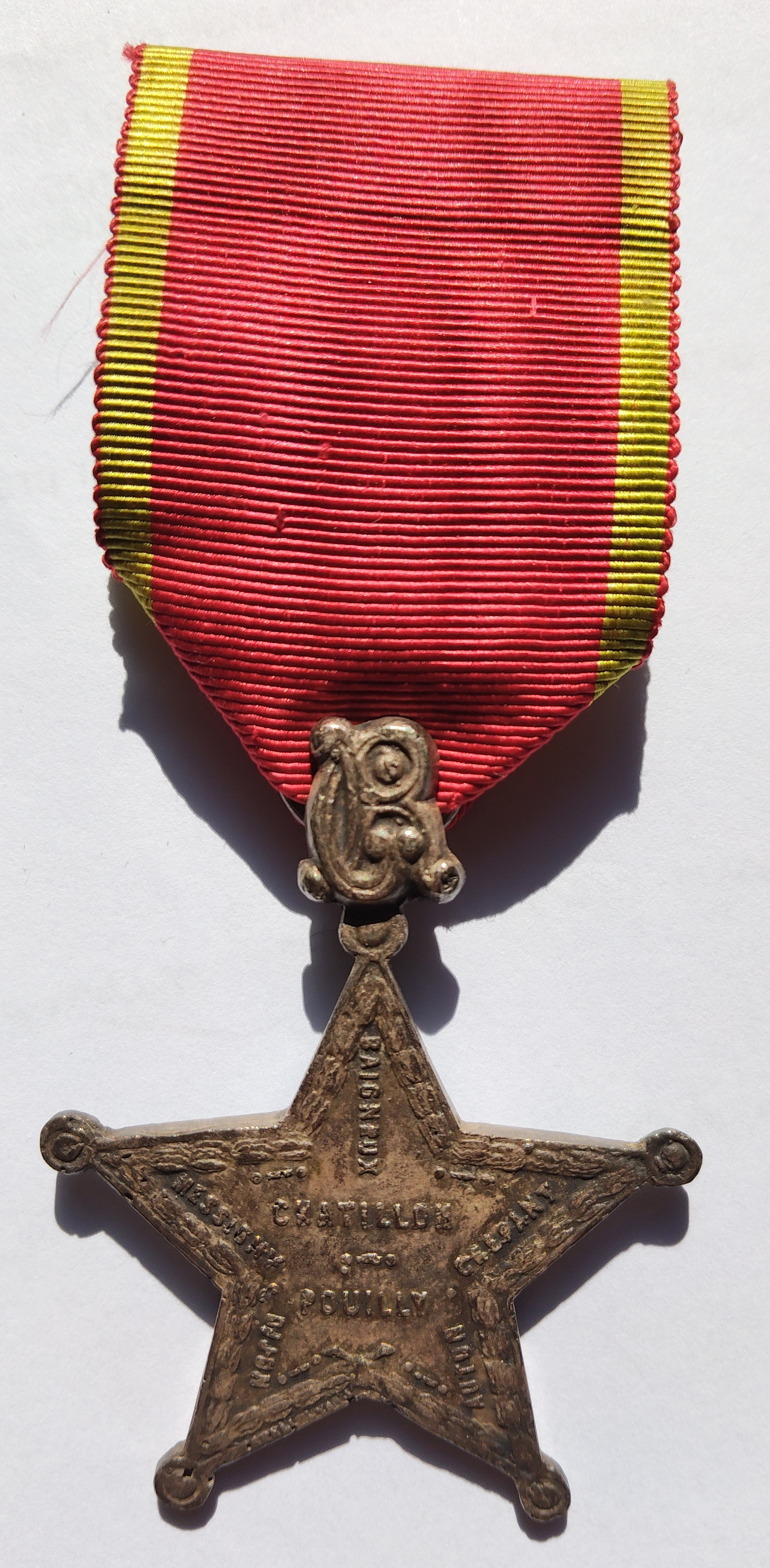
- Native name: Croix commémorative de la 4e Brigade de l'armée des Vosges
- Country: France
- Established: 1896

The Commemorative Cross of the 4th Brigade of the Army of the Vosges is a French commemorative medal created in 1896 on the occasion of the 25th anniversary of the Third Battle of Dijon (21-23 January 1871).

It was a reward for the volunteers of the 4th Brigade of the Army of the Vosges for the actions fought in Burgundy during the War of 1870–1871.

== Description ==
The medal is in the shape of a five-pointed star. On the obverse are inscribed the different places where the volunteers of the 4th brigade of the Army of the Vosges fought: Crépand, Messigny, Autun, Baigneux, Châtillon, and Pouilly.

The reverse bears the legend "REPUBLIQUE FRANCAISE", "4e BRIGADE", "ARMEE DES VOSGES" with the dates "1870-1871", all surmounted by a flag.

The medal is suspended from a stylised "R" and "G", corresponding to the initials of Ricciotti Garibaldi, commander of the brigade and son of Italian nationalist and commander of the Army of the Vosges, Giuseppe Garibaldi.

== Gallery ==
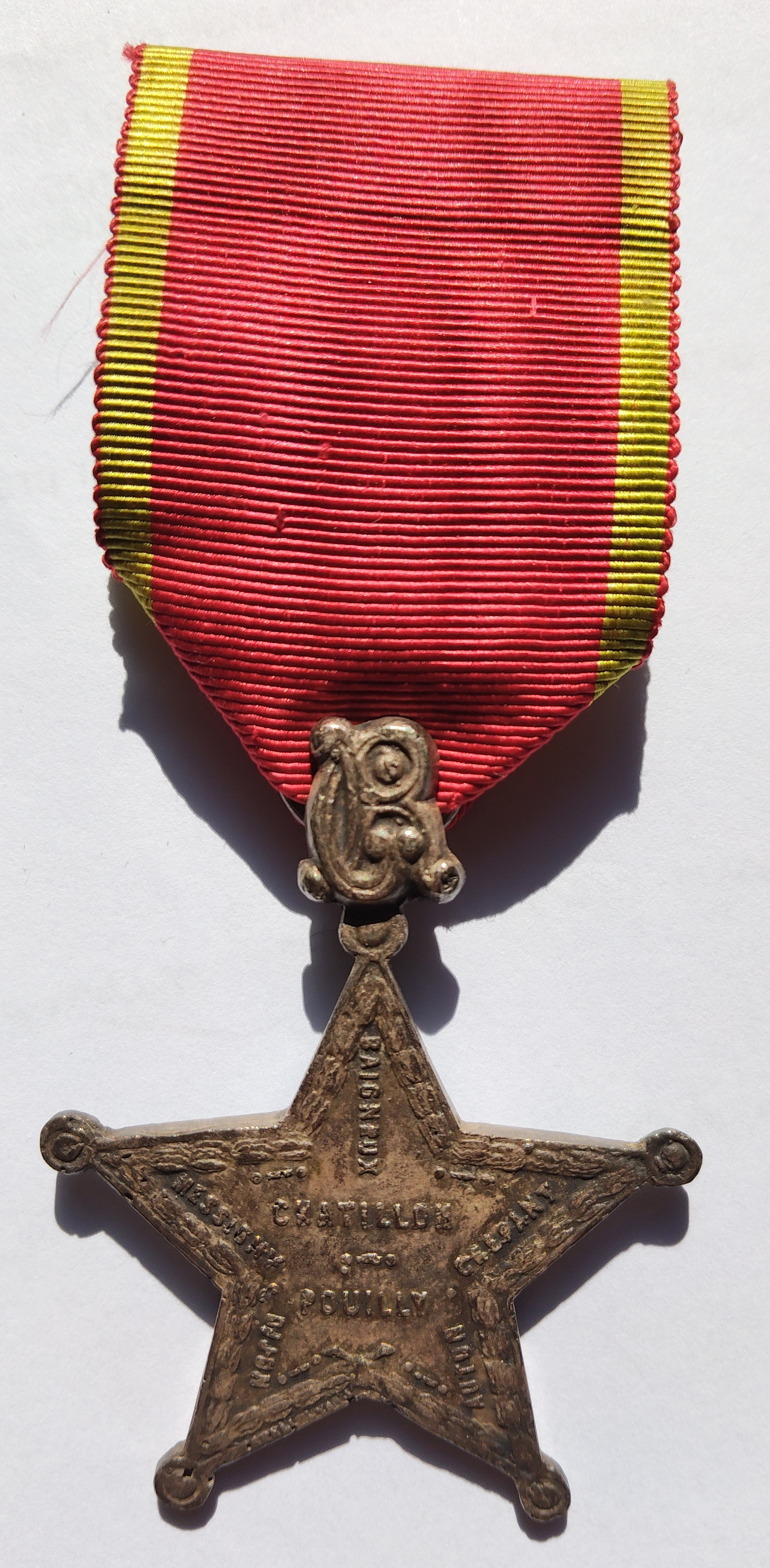
Obverse of the cross.

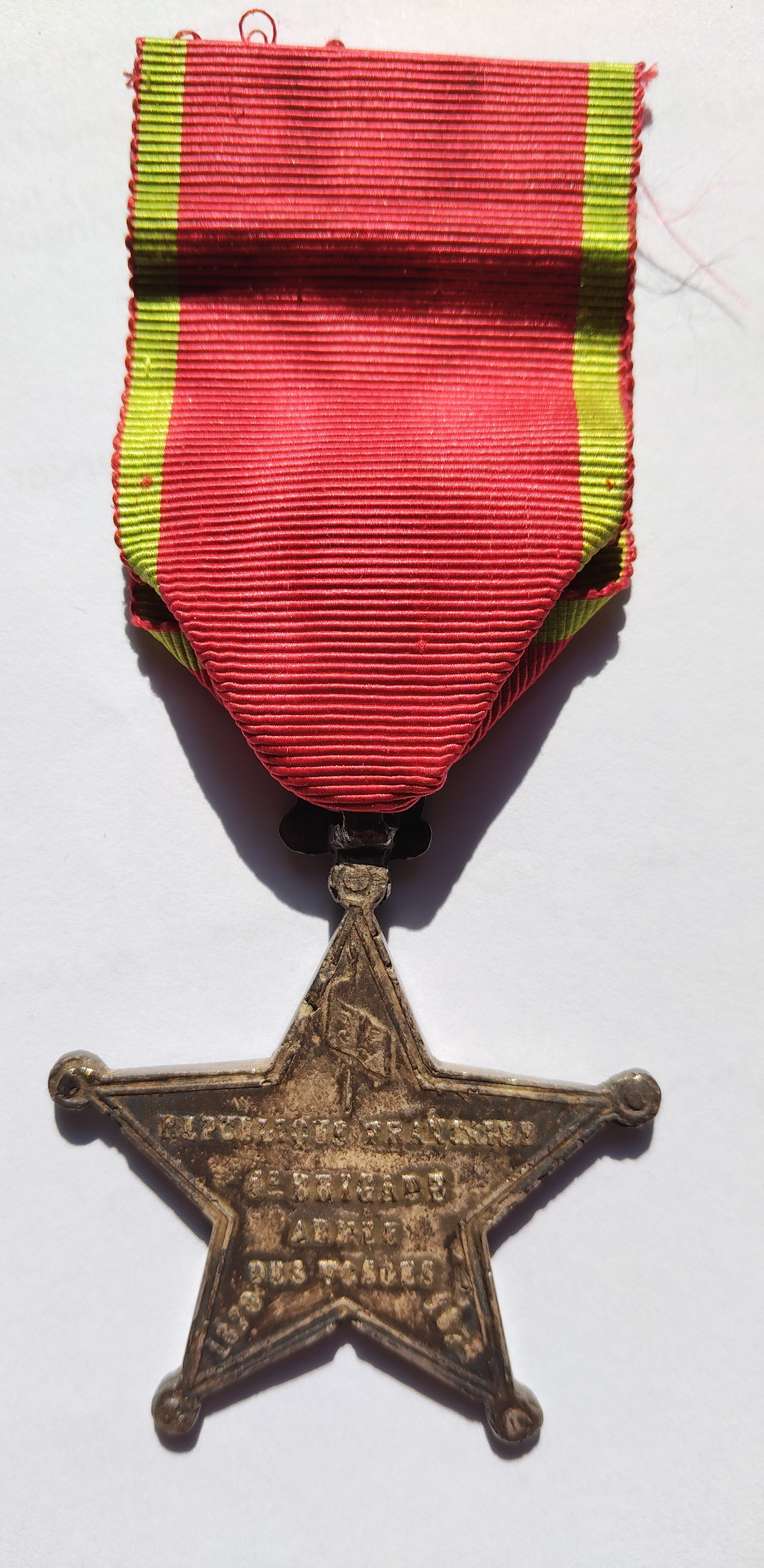
Reverse of the cross.

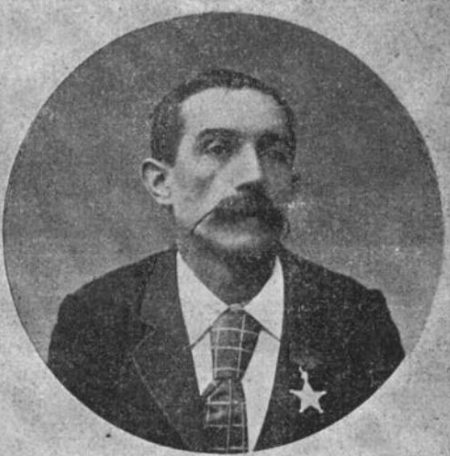
Victor Curtat wearing the cross

== See also ==
- Ordres, décorations et médailles de la France
- Rubans des décorations militaires et civiles françaises
