= Commemorative medal of the 1860 China Expedition =

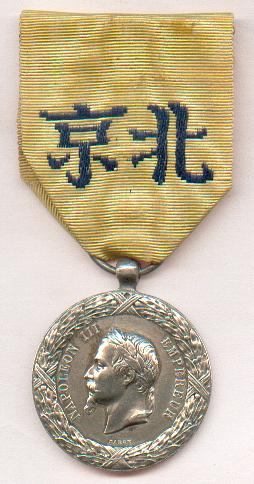
- obverse
- Type: Campaign medal
- Country: Second French Empire
- Presented by: France
- Campaign: Anglo-French expedition to China
- Clasps: none
- Established: 23 January 1861

Highlights
- Total: 8000
- Ribbon of the Commemorative medal of the 1860 China Expedition
- Related: Médaille commémorative de l'expédition de Chine (1901)

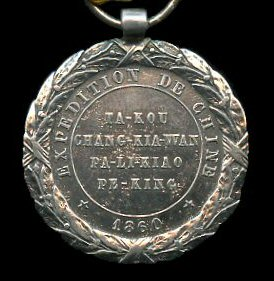
Reverse of the Commemorative medal of the 1860 China Expedition

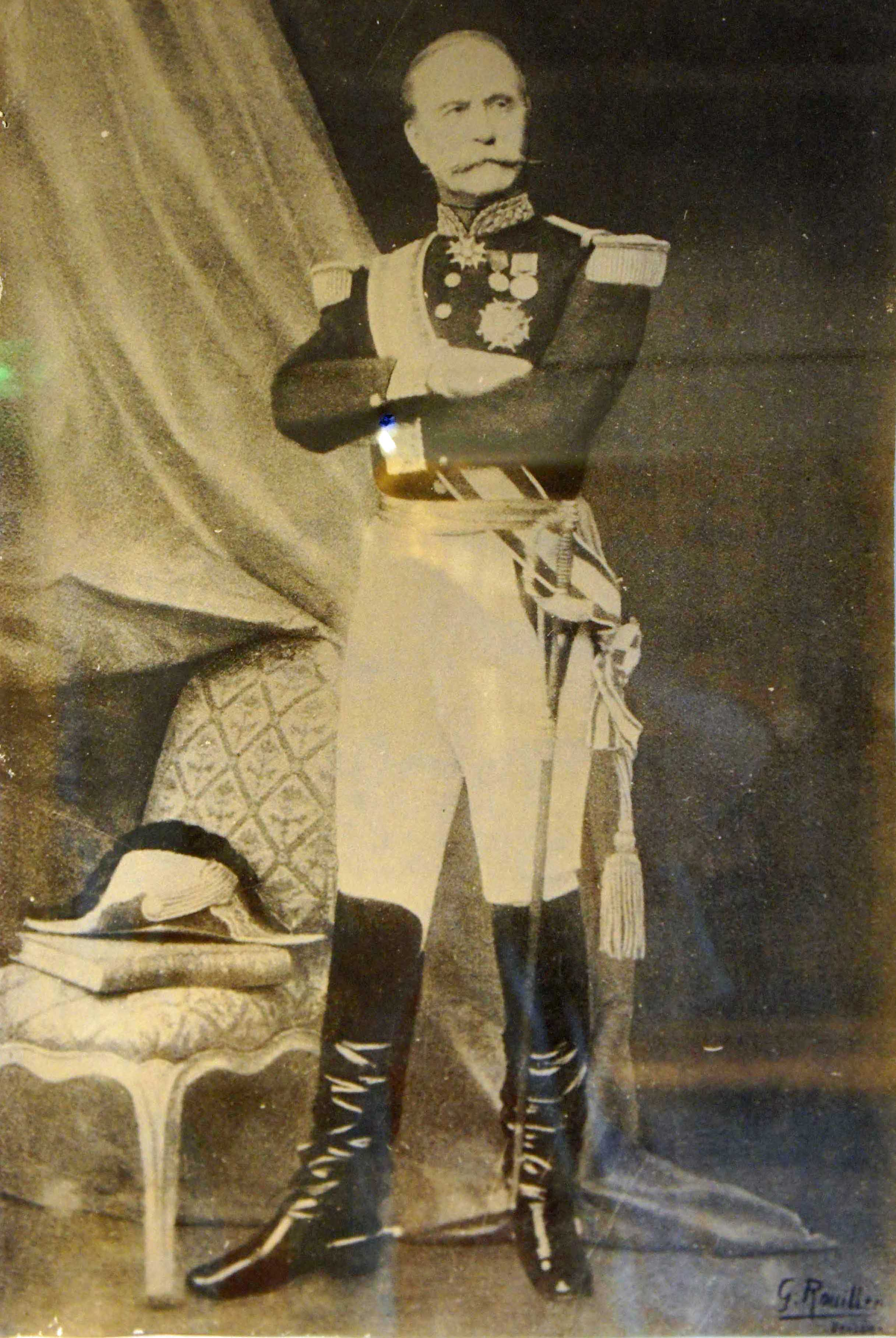
General Élie de Vassoigne, a recipient of the Commemorative medal of the 1860 China Expedition

The Commemorative medal of the 1860 China Expedition (French: Médaille commémorative de l'expédition de Chine de 1860) was a military award of the Second French Empire to reward soldiers and sailors who participated in the Anglo-French expedition to China during the Second Opium War. It was created by imperial decree on 23 January 1861, by Napoleon III.

The British Empire had been engaged in an ongoing conflict with the Qing Dynasty since 1856 over legalizing the opium trade, expanding coolie trade, opening all of China to British merchants, and exempting foreign imports from internal transit duties. Following the 1857 general election in the United Kingdom, the new parliament decided to seek redress from China based on the report about the Arrow Incident submitted by Harry Parkes, British Consul to Guangzhou. The French Empire, the United States, and the Russian Empire received requests from Britain to form an alliance. France joined the British action against China, prompted by the execution of a French missionary, Father August Chapdelaine ("Father Chapdelaine Incident"), by Chinese local authorities in Guangxi province. The conflict concluded with the 1858 Treaty of Tianjin finally ratified by the emperor's brother, Yixin, the Prince Gong, in the Convention of Peking on 18 October 1860.

== Award statute ==
The Commemorative medal of the 1860 China Expedition was awarded by the Emperor to all who served in the China Expedition on propositions of the minister overseeing the service in which the potential recipient served.

All recipients also received a certificate of award.

A later imperial decree dated 25 March 1861 confirmed that all recipients were to adhere to the code of conduct as set by the Imperial decree of 18 March 1852 under the authority of the Grand chancellor of the Legion of Honour.

== Award description ==
The Commemorative medal of the 1860 China Expedition was a 30 mm in diameter circular silver medal designed and engraved by Albert Désiré Barre. Its obverse bore the left profile of Emperor Napoleon III crowned with a laurel wreath surrounded by the relief inscription "NAPOLEON III" "EMPEREUR" (English: "NAPOLEON III" "EMPEROR"). A 4 mm wide relief laurel wreath ran along the entire circumference of both the obverse and reverse of the medal.

On the reverse, within the laurel wreath, the circular relief inscription EXPÉDITION DE CHINE 1860 (English: CHINA EXPEDITION 1860). At the centre, the relief inscription on four lines of the campaign's major battles TA-KOU, CHANG-KIA-WAN, PA-LI-KIAO, PE-KING.

The medal was suspended from a 36 mm wide silk moiré yellow ribbon, at its center, the name of the city of Peking woven in blue Chinese characters. (Note: In reality, instead of the city name 北京 (Běijīng), the text is mistakenly reversed as 京北 (Jīngběi))

== Notable recipients (partial list) ==
- Admiral Benjamin Jaurès
- Admiral Henri Rieunier
- General Élie de Vassoigne
- Colonel Charles-Louis Du Pin
- Lieutenant (N) Francis Garnier

== See also ==
- First Opium War
- French colonial empire
- Imperial China
- Tonkin Expedition commemorative medal: French campaign medal for the Sino-French War
- 1901 China expedition commemorative medal French campaign medal for the Boxer Rebellion
