= Recusant's insignia =

Recusant's Insignia
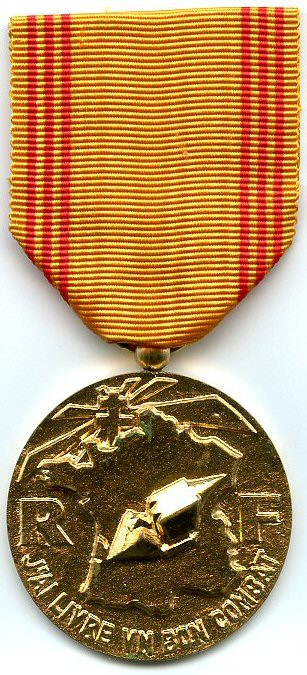
- Obverse
- Type: Commemorative medal
- Awarded for: Refusal to work in the enemy’s war production industry
- Presented by: France
- Eligibility: French citizens
- Status: No longer awarded
- Established: 21 October 1963

Highlights
- Total: ~ 107,974
- Ribbon of the Recusant's Insignia

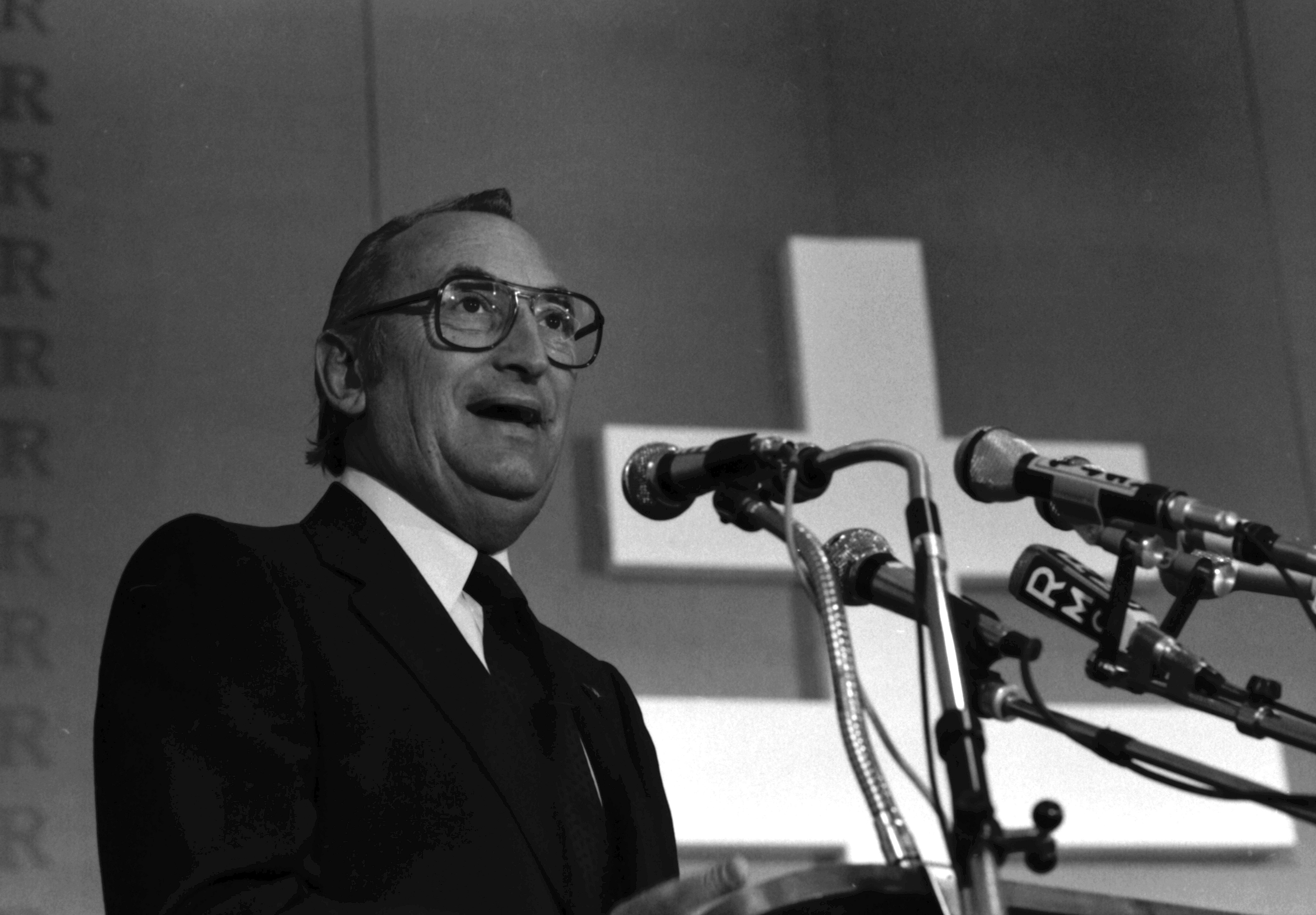
Politician André Bord, a recipient of the Recusant's Insignia

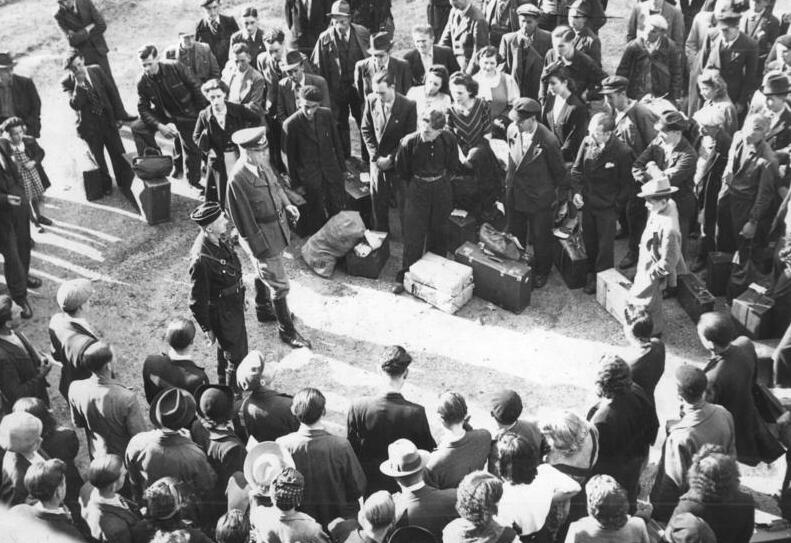
French men and women being chosen for work in Germany, Paris July 1942

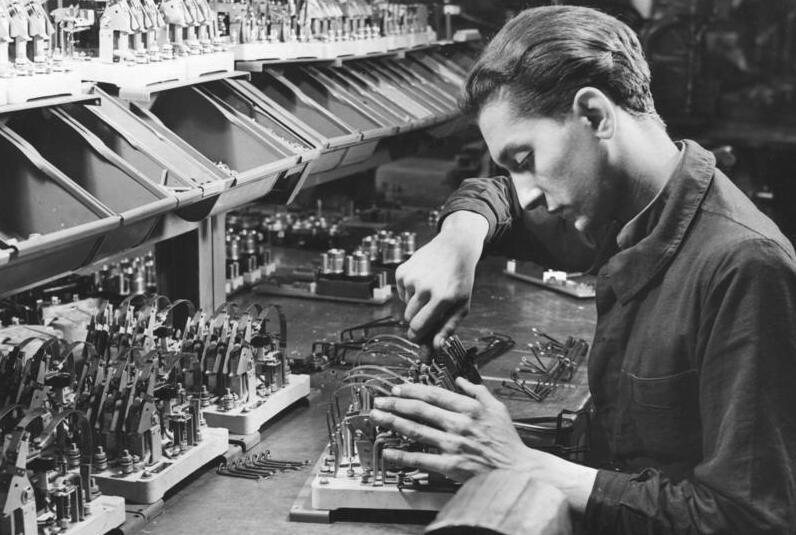
A young Frenchman forced to work in Germany at the Berlin Siemens plant, 1943

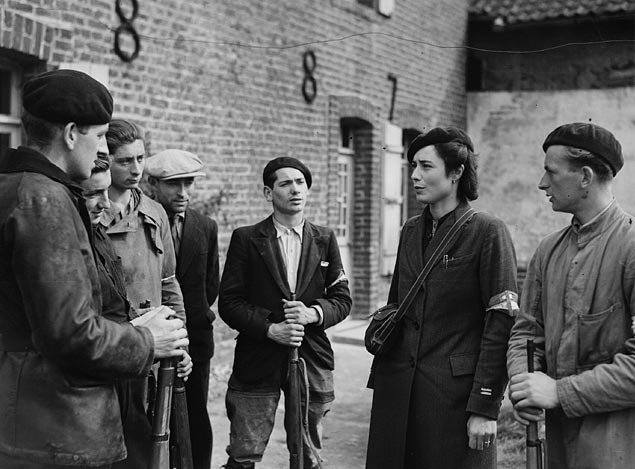
Thousands of recusants were hidden by, and later joined the resistance

The Recusant's Insignia is a French medal to honour French citizens who evaded the Compulsory Work Service (S.T.O.) in Nazi Germany and therefore participated in the fight against the invader.

The law of August 22, 1950, establishing the status of “recusant”, stated in its first article: "The Republic, grateful to those who accepted all the risks in their fight against the enemy's war potential, considering the suffering and the prejudice that this courageous and patriotic attitude caused them, proclaimed and determined the right to reparation for recusants and their successors.

Thirteen years later, on October 21, 1963, Jean Sainteny, minister for veterans and war victims, signed the decree creating this medal, officially called "Recusant's Insignia" (French: Insigne du réfractaire). The service of the National Office of the Veterans and Victims of War of the department of residence delivers the card of the Recusant authorizing the wearing of this insignia.

The National Recusants' Group (French: Groupement National des Réfractaires) initiated the National Recusant's Day, held annually in France on 6 June.

== Award statute ==
The Recusant's Insignia can be worn by French citizens bearing the title of “recusant” (French: réfractaire). Recusants are persons who prior to June 6, 1944 found themselves in the following situations:

1. persons who, having been the subject of a requisition order resulting from the acts of the so-called law of 4 September 1942, decree of 19 September 1942, law of 16 February 1943 and/or law of 1 February 1944, voluntarily abandoned their business not to comply with this order;
2. persons who, under the constraints mentioned in the preceding paragraph or who were victims of raids, have escaped from the territories and businesses in which they were assigned;
3. persons who, under these constraints or victims of raids, were sent to Germany but who voluntarily did not return there after their first leave in France;
4. persons who, without having received requisition or transfer orders, but who were entered in workforce lists or belonging to classes of mobilization likely to be called up, evaded preventively by abandoning their business.

Also those who have, since their refusal to submit or their preventive withdrawal from the laws on compulsory labour, lived on the margins of the laws of Vichy and were victims of searches or prosecution from the French or German administrations.

Are also considered recusants, persons in the departments of Bas-Rhin, Haut-Rhin or Moselle who, following their annexation by the enemy:

1. either abandoned their homes in order not to respond to a mobilization order in German military or paramilitary formations;
2. or abandoned their homes, whereas, being part of the mobilizable classes by the German authorities, they were at risk of being incorporated into German military or paramilitary formations.

Recusant workers from the Compulsory Work Service are eligible for the 1939–1945 Commemorative war medal

== Award description ==
The design of the Recusant's Insignia was decided by a contest opened by a decree of 17 July 1961. The winner, artist engraver M. Hollebecq, was announced in the 1963 establishment decree which also directed the Paris mint to produce the insignias.

The Recusant's Insignia is a 36 mm in diameter circular medal struck from bronze or gilt bronze. Its obverse bears the relief image of a map of France, a broken anvil at its center symbolizes the refusal to work. Above the map, a Cross of Lorraine symbolizing hope and support for the oppressed. On either side, the relief initials “R” and “F” for (French: République Française) (French Republic), at the bottom, the relief semi-circular inscription (French: J’AI LIVRÉ UN BON COMBAT) (I HAVE FOUGHT A GOOD BATTLE). On the reverse, the circular relief inscription along the top ¾ of the medal circumference (French: AUX RÉFRACTAIRES GUERRE 1939 - 1945) (TO THE RECUSANTS 1939 – 1945 WAR).

The medal hangs from a 37 mm wide silk moiré bright yellow ribbon with three 1 mm wide red vertical stripes spaced 1 mm apart and located 2 mm from the outer edges.

== Notable recipients (partial list) ==
- Politician André Bord
- Politician Jean Corlin
- Astronomer Pierre Bourge
- Physicist Raimond Castaing
- Politician Bernard Restout
- Politician Louis Eyraud
- Writer Jean Vezole
- Union leader Jacques Fournier
- Politician Robert Pontillon
- Resistance fighter Roland Despains
- Politician André Fumex
- Lawyer Yves Jouffa
- Politician Jacques Sourdille
- Historian Yves Battistini

== See also ==
- Forced labour under German rule during World War II
- German military administration in occupied France during World War II
- Arbeitseinsatz
- French Resistance
- Vichy France
- World War II
