= Commemorative medal of the 1859 Italian Campaign =

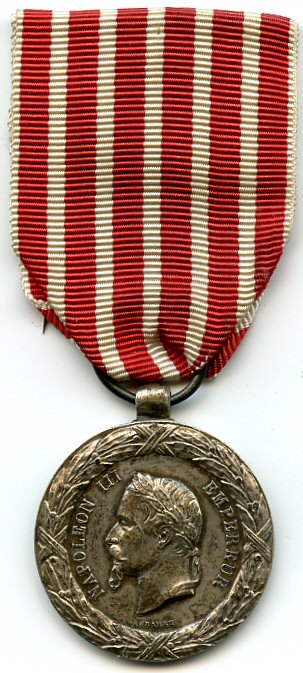
- Commemorative medal of the 1859 Italian Campaign (obverse)
- Type: Campaign medal
- Awarded for: Combat service in Italy in 1859
- Presented by: the (France) French Second Empire
- Eligibility: French soldiers
- Status: No longer awarded
- Established: 11 August 1859
- First award: 11 August 1859
- Final award: 1859
- Ribbon bar

Precedence
- Next (higher): Saint Helena Medal
- Next (lower): Commemorative medal of the 1860 China Expedition

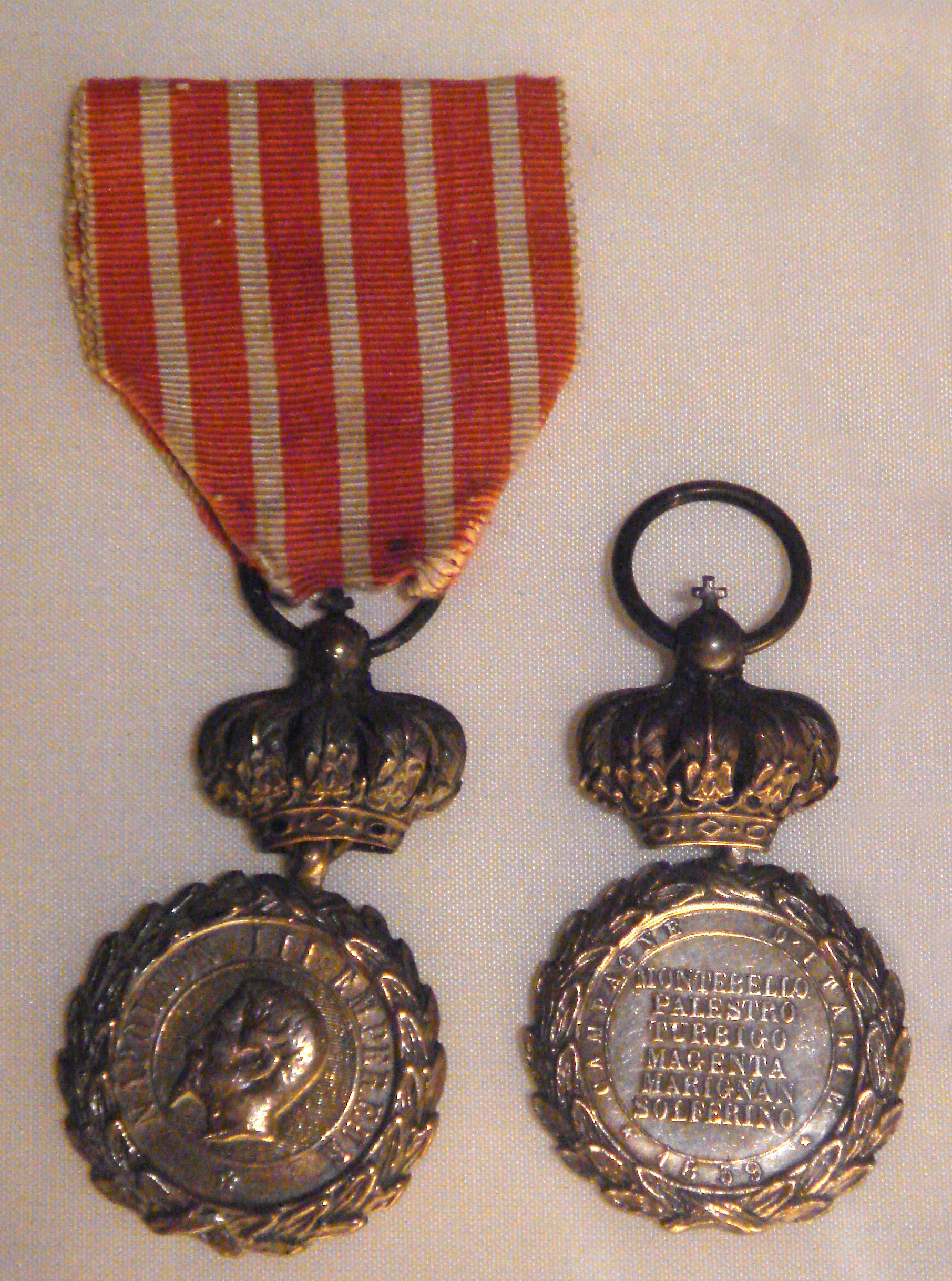
Commemorative medal of the 1859 Italian Campaign, crowned variant

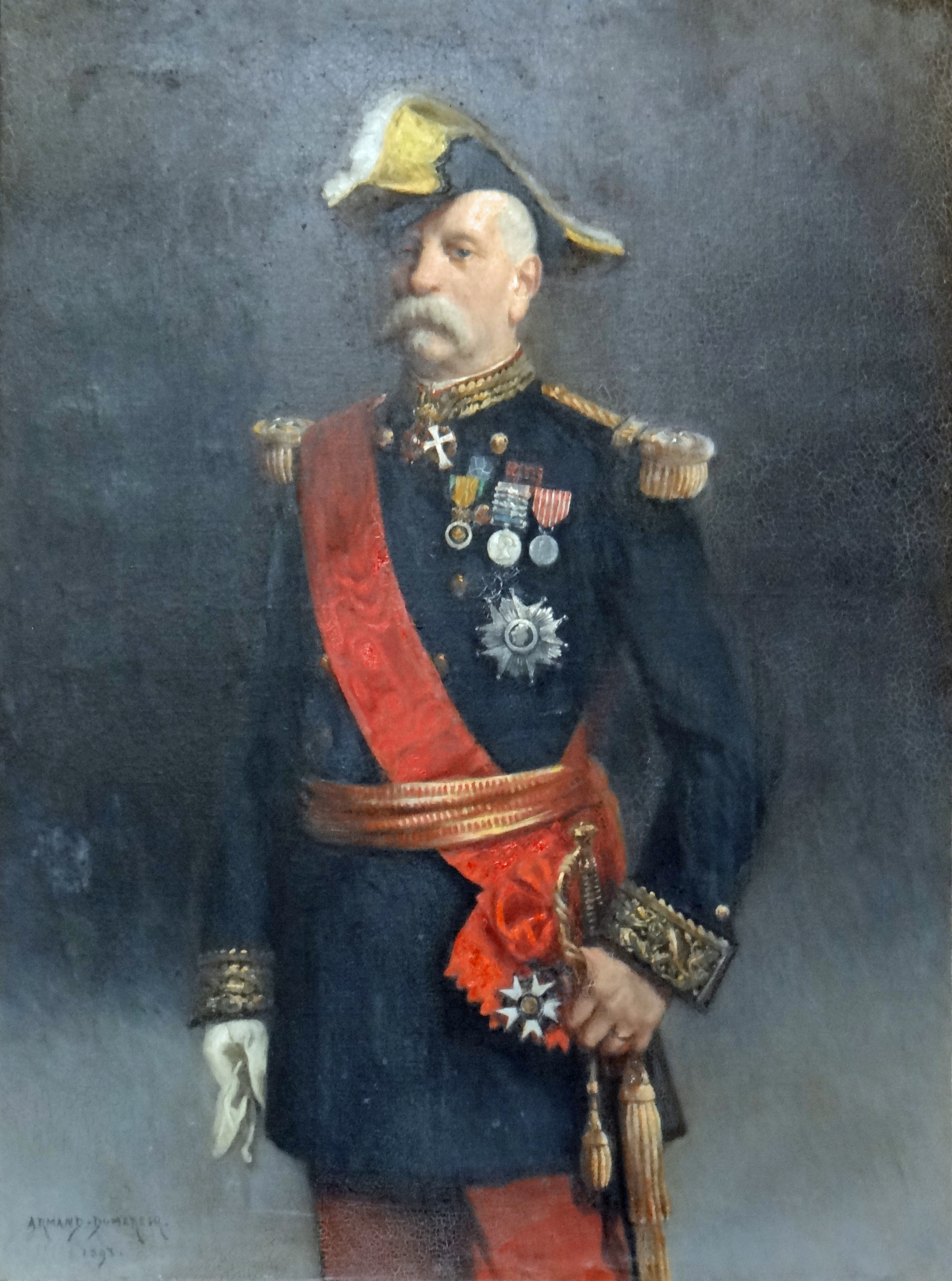
General Victor Février, a recipient of the Commemorative medal of the 1859 Italian Campaign

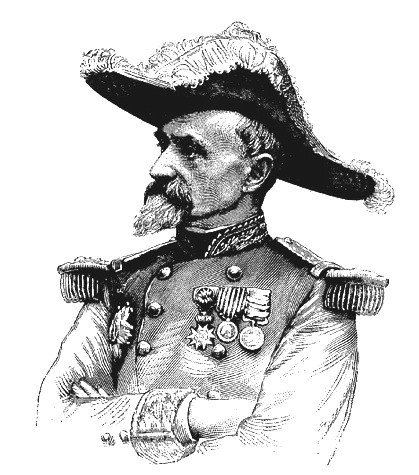
General Alexandre Montaudon, a recipient of the Commemorative medal of the 1859 Italian Campaign

The Commemorative medal of the 1859 Italian Campaign (French: médaille commémorative de la campagne d'Italie de 1859) was a French commemorative medal established by Napoleon III, following the 1859 French campaign in Italy during the Second Italian War of Independence.

Early in 1815, there was a powerful popular movement in favour of national unification throughout the Italian Peninsula. This idea, championed by the King of Sardinia Victor Emmanuel II, was opposed by Pope Pius IX and the Austrian Empire who occupied the provinces of Lombardy and Veneto. In Europe, Italian unification was only supported by Emperor Napoleon III of the French Empire who, on 28 January 1859, based on the clauses of the Treaty of Turin, decided to bring aid and support from France. Piedmont being invaded by 100,000 Austrian soldiers on April 26, 1859, France declared war on the Austrian Empire on May 3, 1859.

In spite of the lack of preparation of the French army, the soldiers, alongside their Piedmont and Sardinian allies were to illustrate themselves in several famous battles, including that of Magenta on June 4, which allowed Napoleon III and Victor Emmanuel II to enter triumphantly in Milan on 8 June. Then, on June 24, the Franco-Piedmontese forces took the village of Solferino after a terrible battle culminating in an armistice signed at Villafranca on July 12.

The French forces, composed of an army of 120,000 men, were commanded by the Emperor and placed under the orders of Marshals Achille Baraguey d'Hilliers and François Certain de Canrobert, Generals Patrice de Mac-Mahon, Adolphe Niel and Auguste Regnaud de Saint-Jean d'Angély. During the three-month campaign, French losses amounted to 8,000 dead and 40,000 wounded.

To reward all participants and ensure the memory of this glorious military campaign, the Commemorative Medal of the Italian Campaign was created by Imperial Decree on August 11, 1859. Nearly 120,000 medals were awarded to reward all soldiers and sailors who participated in the Italian campaign of 1859.

== Award statute ==
The Commemorative medal of the 1859 Italian Campaign was awarded by the Emperor, on propositions of the ministers for war and for the navy, to all soldiers, sailors and other military and support personnel of the French forces who took part in the 1859 Italian Campaign.

All recipients also received a certificate of award.

A later imperial decree dated 24 October 1859 confirmed that all recipients were to adhere to the code of conduct as set by the Imperial decree of 18 March 1852 under the authority of the Grand chancellor of the Legion of Honour.

A revised list of all French naval units who participated in the campaign was submitted on 18 February 1860 resulting in a 22 March 1860 amendment to the disposition of the award to navy recipients.

== Award description ==
The Commemorative medal of the 1859 Italian Campaign, a work of Albert Désiré Barre, was a 30 mm in diameter circular silver medal. Its obverse bore the left profile of Emperor Napoleon III crowned with a laurel wreath surrounded by the relief inscription "NAPOLEON III" "EMPEREUR" (English: "NAPOLEON III" "EMPEROR"). A 4 mm wide relief laurel wreath ran along the entire circumference of both the obverse and reverse of the medal.

On the reverse, within the laurel wreath, the circular relief inscription CAMPAGNE D'ITALIE 1859 (English: ITALIAN CAMPAIGN 1859). At the centre, the relief inscription on six lines of the campaign's major battles MONTEBELLO, PALESTRO, TURBIGO, MAGENTA, MARIGNAN, SOLFERINO.

The medal hung from a 36 mm wide silk moiré ribbon bearing six 4 mm wide red stripes and five 2 mm wide white stripes. A variant bearing the imperial crown as an integral part of the suspension ring is called variant of the "100 guards" (French: Cent-Gardes).

== Notable recipients (partial list) ==
- Philip Kearny (first American to receive the Legion of Honour)
- General Giacomo Medici
- General Pierre Louis Charles de Failly
- General François Achille Bazaine
- Enrico Cosenz
- General Jean-Baptiste Alexandre Montaudon
- General Enrico Morozzo Della Rocca
- Major Pierre-Frédéric Péchin
- Colonel Luigi Pelloux
- Colonel François Henri Guiot de La Rochère
- General Émile Herbillon
- Colonel Pierre Émile Arnaud Édouard de Colbert-Chabannais
- General Élie Frédéric Forey
- Doctor Frédéric Audemard d'Alançon
- General Teodoro Lechi
- Lieutenant Vitalis Pacha
- Colonel Alfred Frédéric Philippe Auguste Napoléon Ameil
- General Giuseppe Dezza
- General Adolphe Niel
- General Jean César Graziani
- General Gustave Olivier Lannes de Montebello
- General Justin Clinchant
- Felice Napoleone Canevaro
- General Armand Alexandre de Castagny

== See also ==
- First Italian War of Independence
- Third Italian War of Independence
- 1943–1944 Italian campaign medal: French campaign medal for the Italian campaign (World War II)
