= Albert d'Amade =

French general

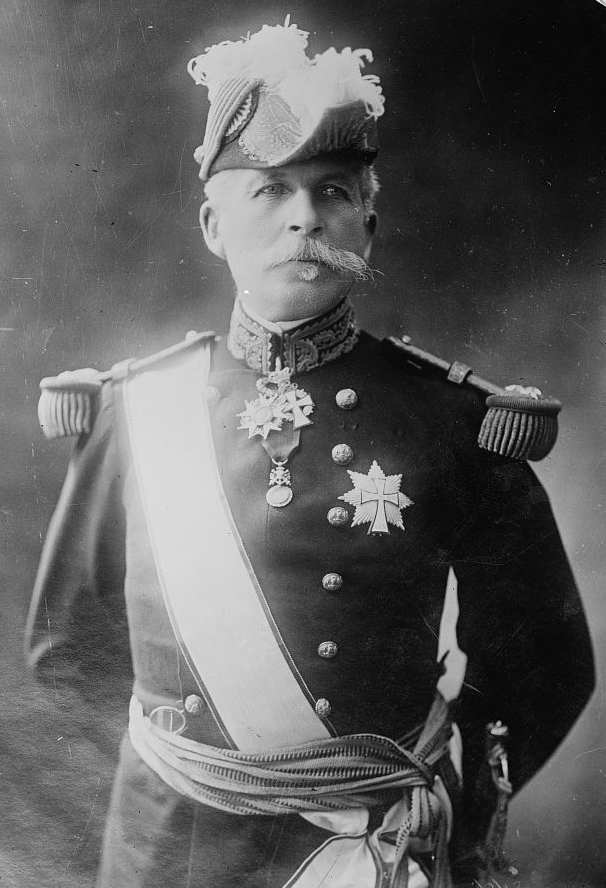
- Born: 24 December 1856
- Died: 11 November 1941 (aged 84)
- Allegiance: France
- Rank: General

Albert Gérard Léo d'Amade (24 December 1856 – 11 November 1941) was a French general. In January 1908 he replaced General Antoine Drude in Morocco. In February 1915, he received the Corps expéditionnaire d'Orient and subsequently led them during the initial stages of the Gallipoli campaign.

Lt. Col. John Henry Patterson, who commanded the Zion Mule Corps at Gallipoli, was stationed near General d'Amade's forces just before the general left the Dardanelles for France. In chapter 14 of his book, With the Zionists in Gallipoli, he discusses his great respect for General d'Amade and the general's son, Gerard, who was killed in February 1915.

“ONE end of our camp was in touch with the French lines and, of course, I saw a great deal of the French soldiers and a little of their gallant Commander, General d'Amade. I know, therefore, with what feelings of regret his men heard that he was about to return to France. He had endeared himself by his unfailing courtesy and goodwill, and had impressed with his fine, soldierly qualities all those with whom he had in any way come into contact.

During the tenure of his command, the French troops had, at the point of the bayonet, wrested seemingly impregnable positions from the brave foe. Their losses had been cruel, terrible, but their deeds are imperishable.

The military records of France make glorious reading, but even to these dazzling pages General d'Amade and his gallant troops have added fresh lustre. A sad blow had fallen upon the General while he was in Alexandria reorganising his Corps Expéditionnaire d'Orient, prior to its departure for Gallipoli. In the midst of his work a telegram was handed to him announcing that his son had fallen gloriously in France. The General, having read the heart-breaking message, paused for a moment and then remarked: ‘Well, our work for France must go on.’

It was my good fortune to see the order of the day of the Journal Officiel du 11 Février, 1915, which recounted the death and gallant deeds of General d'Amade's boy. He was only eighteen and had just joined his regiment, the 131st Infantry, when he went on a perilous night mission to obtain information which could only be got by creeping up into the German trenches. With just two men he accomplished this dangerous duty successfully, but at that very moment he was discovered and a volley from the enemy laid him low. Although grievously wounded, his first thought was for France, so, forbidding his comrades to carry him off, he told them to fly with all speed to the French lines with the valuable information which he had obtained. Young Gerard d'Amade died where he had fallen, a noble example of that spirit of self-sacrifice which characterises all ranks of the French Army.

A framed copy of this order of the day has now a place of honour in the nursery of a little boy I know of who, every night before he goes to bed, stands in front of it at the salute and says: ‘I do this in memory of a brave French officer who gave his life for his country. May I so live that, if necessary, I may be ready to die for England as nobly as Gerard d'Amade died for France.’

The British public is little aware of what it owes to General d'Amade. During the terrible retreat of our Expeditionary Force from Mons, when we were outnumbered by five to one, and when the Germans were closing round our small army in overwhelming numbers, General Sir John French sent out urgent appeals for assistance in this hour of dire peril to the Generals commanding the French armies on his right and left. For some reason or other none of these came to his aid, and for a time it looked as if our gallant little army would be engulfed and annihilated.

Fortunately, there was one French General to whom the appeal was not made in vain. This was General d'Amade, who, at that time, was guarding the line in the northwest of France from Dunkerque to Valenciennes. To hold this very important eighty miles of front all the troops he had were four divisions of somewhat ill-equipped Territorials, with very few guns. It must be remembered that the French Territorial is past his prime and, as a rule, is the father of a family, and considers his fighting days over.

It can well be imagined, therefore, what an anxious time General d'Amade had during those fateful days from the 19th to the 28th August, 1914, when at any moment the German avalanche might burst upon him. On the 24th August his force was strengthened by two Reserve Divisions (the 61st and 62nd), which only arrived in the nick of time, for with these he was able to do something in answer to General French's despairing appeal. General d'Amade maneuvered these two Reserve Divisions into a position which seriously threatened von Kluck's flank. That 'hacking' General, not knowing the strength of General d'Amade's menacing force, became anxious for his right flank and communications, so turned aside from his pursuit of the British and proceeded to crush the French. These two divisions put up such an heroic fight and offered such a stubborn resistance to the German horde that it took the pressure off our sorely stricken men, enabling them to extricate themselves and retire, broken, exhausted, tired, crushed, it is true, but still to retire to safety, where they were able to reorganise and take ample vengeance on the Germans a few days later.

General d'Amade lost practically his entire force, but he had gained something very precious; he had saved our army from destruction, and what is more, he had saved the honour of France—nay, even France itself, for if the French generals had stood idly by and allowed our Expeditionary Force to be wiped out of existence, I think it is more than likely that France might have prayed in vain for any further assistance, in troops at all events, from England.

All honour, therefore, to the General who, without hesitation, with just two Reserve Divisions, took the shock of the German legions and sacrificed himself and his troops rather than see the honour of France go down in the dust. Politicians may recommend the bestowal of honours and decorations on their favourite Generals, but General d'Amade deserves more than this, he deserves a tribute from the British people. He made a magnificent sacrifice in our cause, and if ever in the history of the world a general deserved a sword of honour from a nation, General d'Amade deserves one from England.”
