= Madagascar commemorative medal =

1886 and 1896 French military commemorative medals

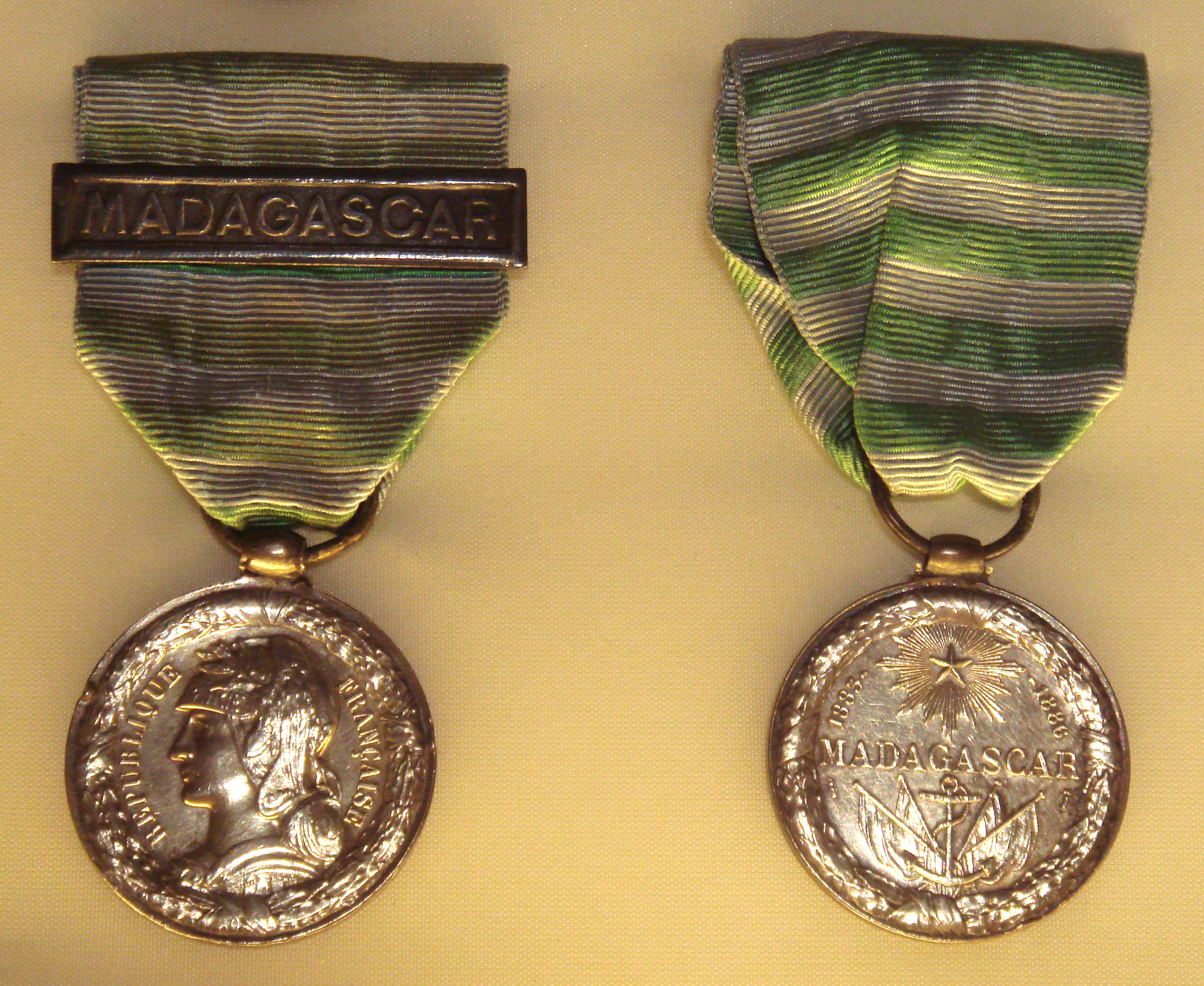
- Medal of the First Madagascar expedition. Musée de la Légion d'Honneur.
- Type: Campaign medal
- Awarded for: Service in French colonial expeditions to Madagascar
- Country: France
- Campaigns: First Madagascar expedition Second Madagascar expedition
- Established: July 31, 1886
- Ribbon bar of the medal

The Madagascar commemorative medal (French: Médaille commémorative de Madagascar) was a French commemorative medal issued to the participants to the First Madagascar expedition in 1883, and the Second Madagascar expedition in 1894–95. Two different medals were issued, the first one by the law of 31 July 1886, the second one by the law of 15 January 1896.

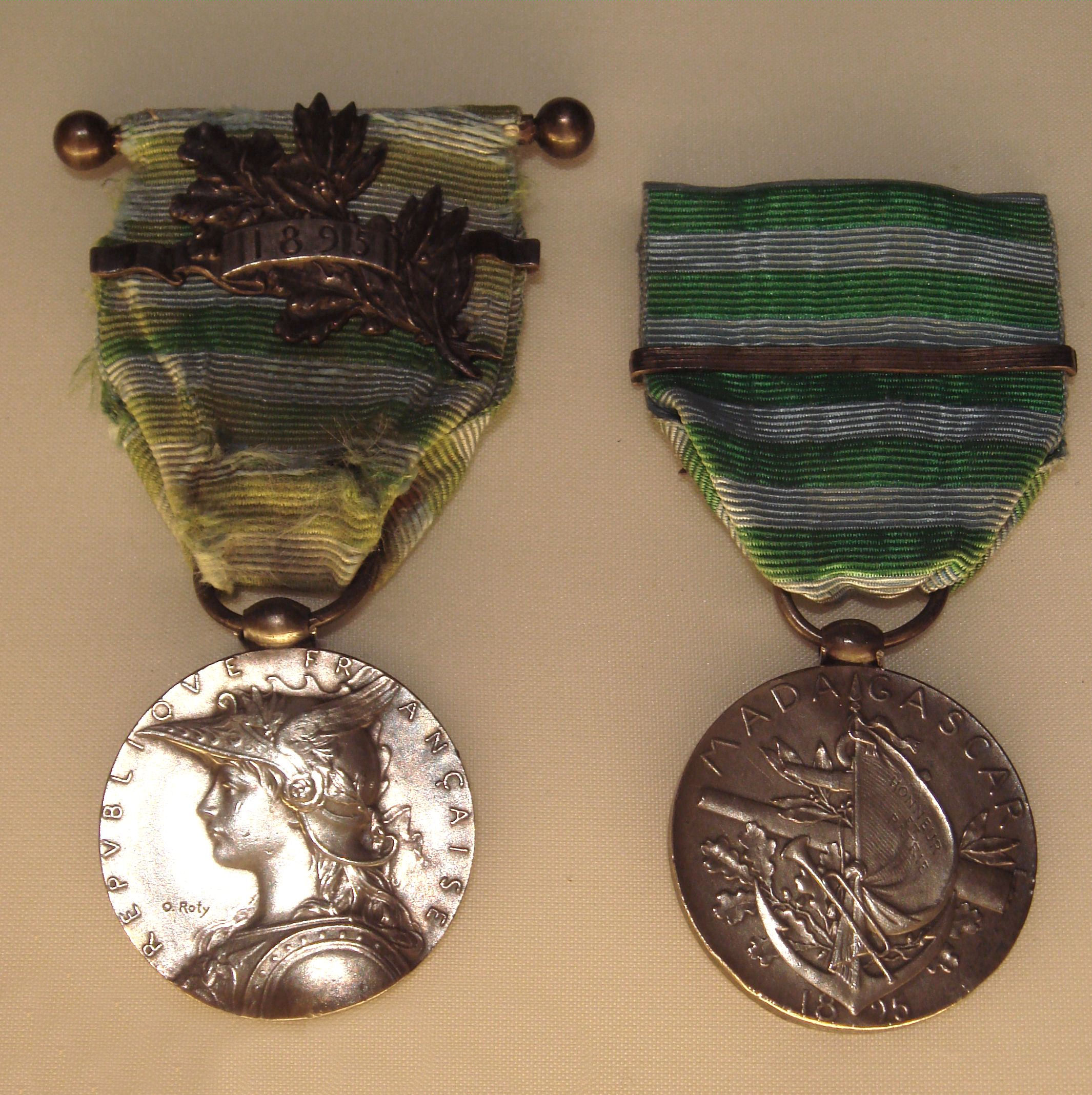
Medal of the Second Madagascar expedition. Law of 15 January 1896. Musée de la Légion d'Honneur.
