= Henri Rieunier =

French admiral and politician

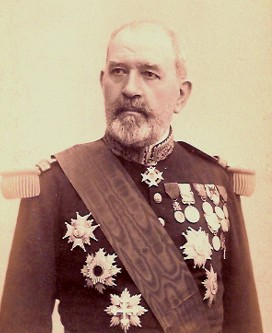
Rieunier

Henri Adrien Barthélemy Louis Rieunier (6 March 1833, Castelsarrasin – 10 July 1918, Albi) was a French admiral and politician, most notable for his involvement in Vietnam.
