= Orders, decorations, and medals of France =

Modern orders, decorations and medals of France awarded to armed forces and civilians

This is a list of some of the modern orders, decorations and medals of France. Some, like the Legion of Honour, are awarded to both the armed forces and civilians. Others are decorations of a pure civilian or military character. Only four of the 19 Ministerial orders have survived the reform of the French system of decorations in 1963. The others were replaced by the Ordre national du Mérite.

The Grand Chancery of the Legion of Honour classifies the national system of honours of France into two categories: those honours awarded on behalf of the President of the Republic and ministerial honours. The orders and decorations presented on behalf of the president are the Legion of Honour, Order of Liberation, Military Medal, National Order of Merit, and National Medal of Recognition for victims of terrorism. The ministerial honours include French military decorations, the existing ministerial orders, ministerial awards for acts of courage and honor medals, and commemorative medals.

== National orders ==
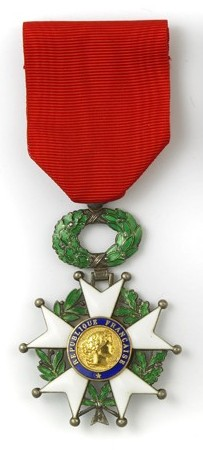
Legion of Honour

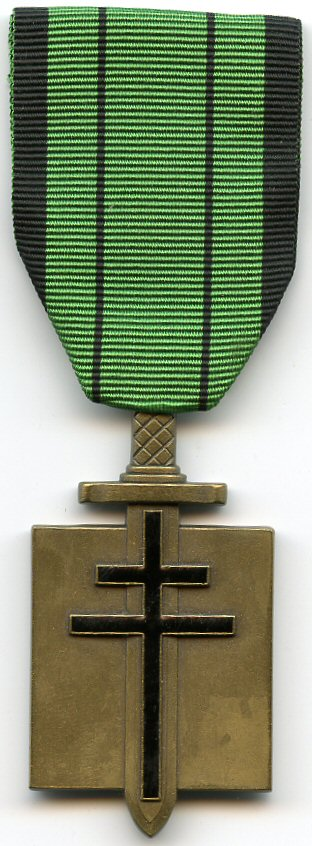
Order of Liberation

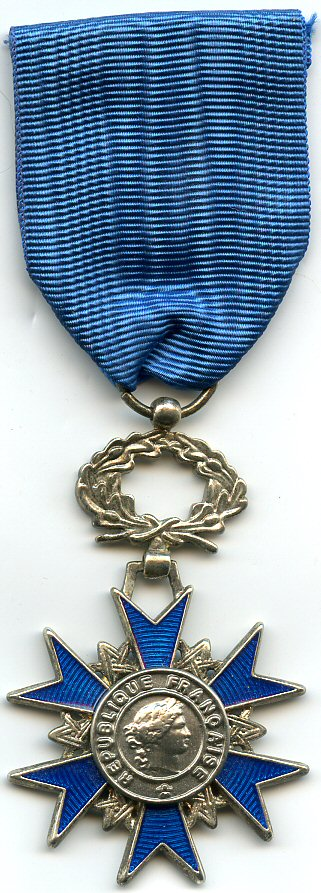
National Order of Merit

== Ministerial orders ==
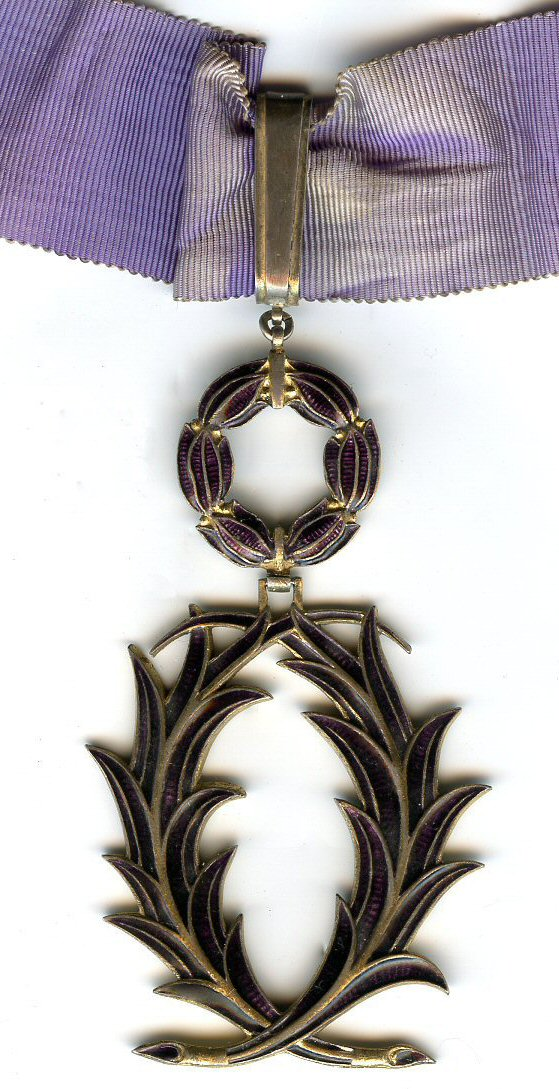
Order of Academic Palms

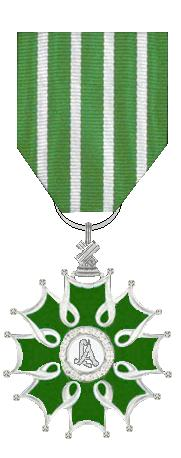
Order of Arts and Letters

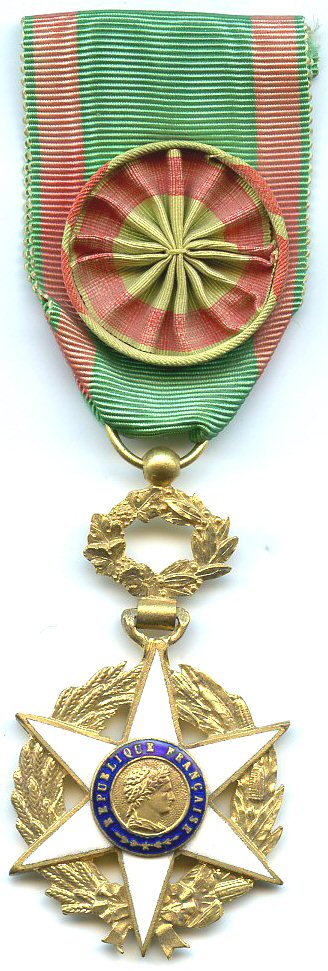
Order of Agricultural Merit

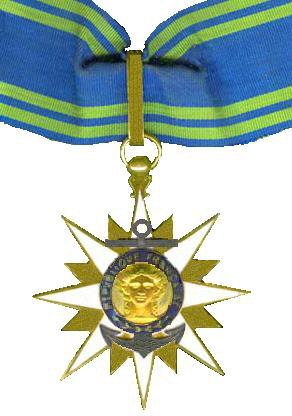
Order of Maritime Merit

== Military decorations ==
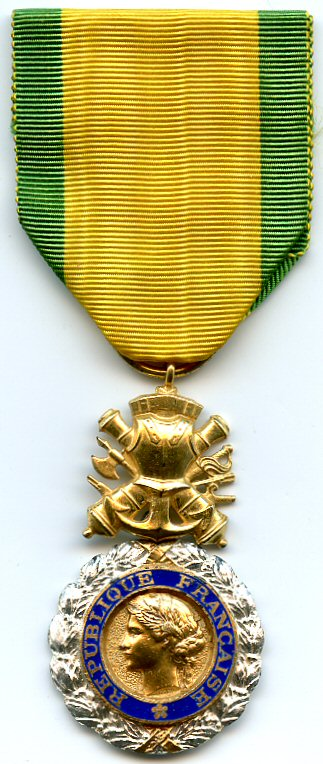
Military Medal

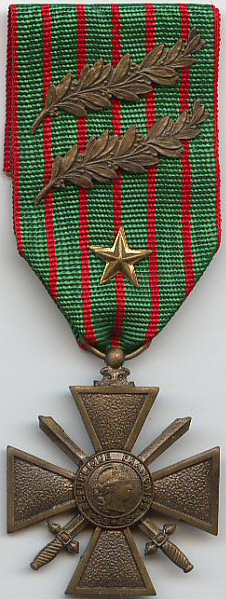
War Cross (1914–1918)

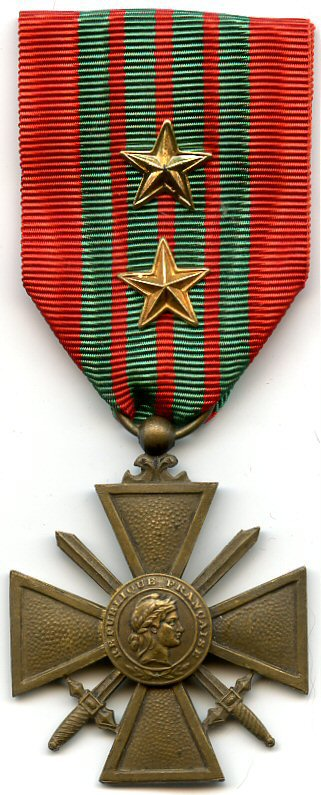
War Cross (1939–1945)

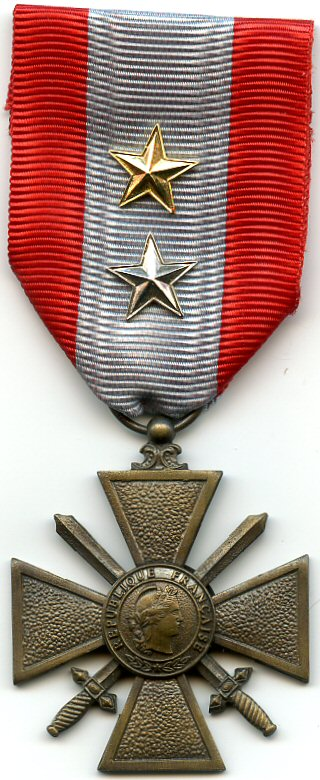
War Cross for foreign operational theaters

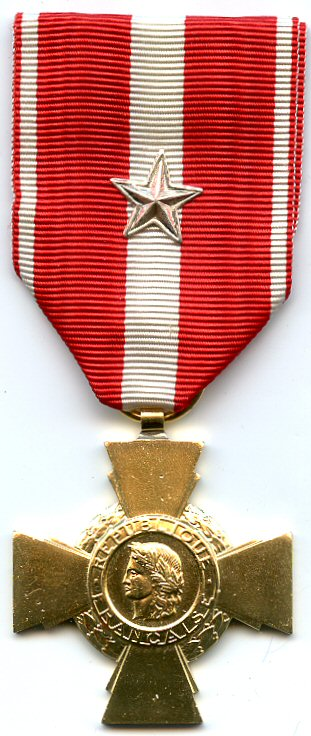
Cross for Military Valour

Medal of the Gendarmerie nationale

Resistance Medal

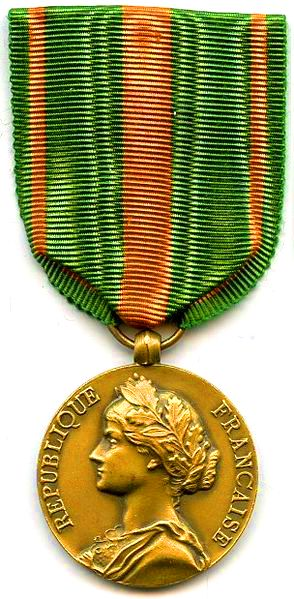
Escapees' Medal

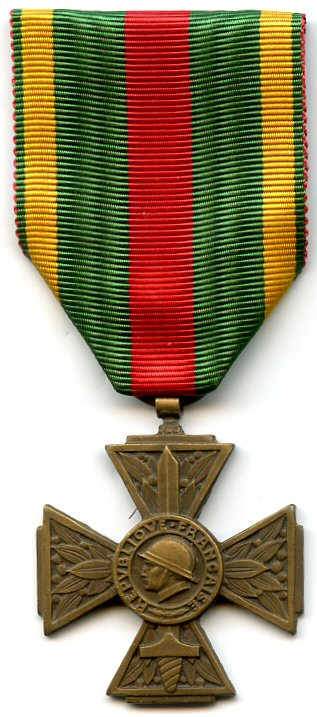
Volunteer combatant's cross 1914–1918

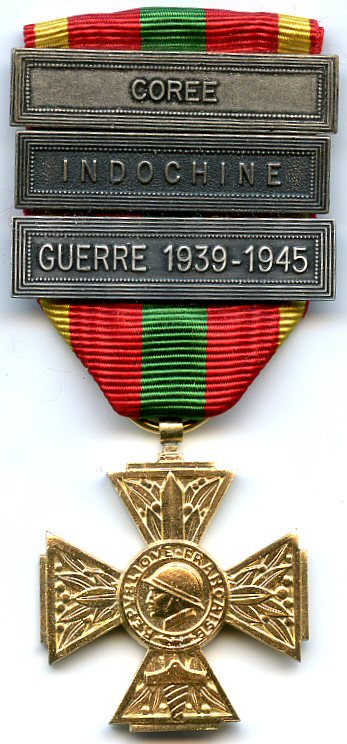
Volunteer combatant's cross

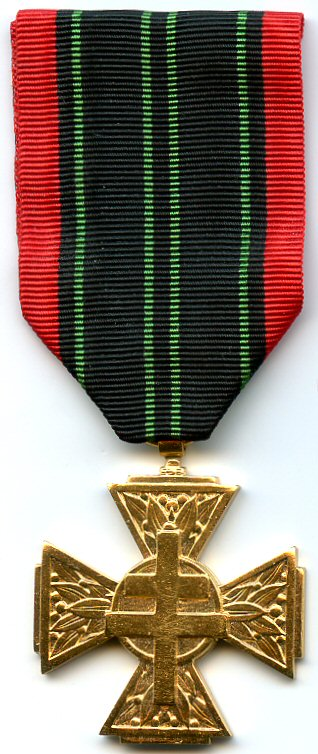
Cross of the resistance volunteer combatant

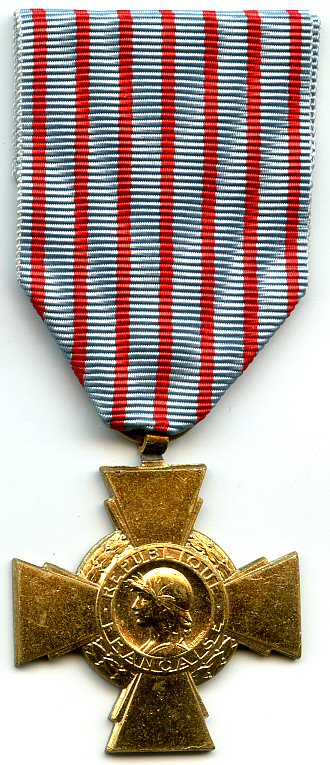
Combatant's Cross

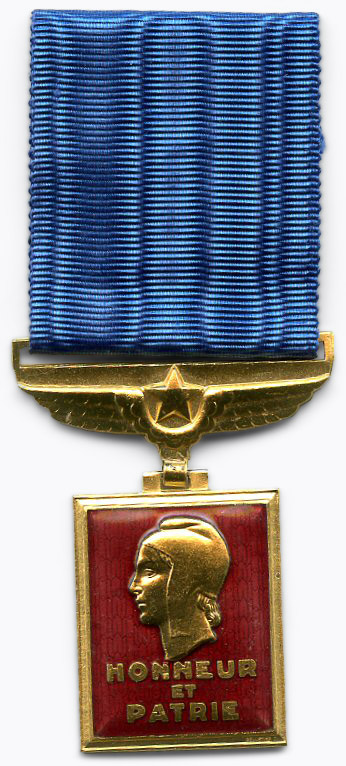
Aeronautical Medal

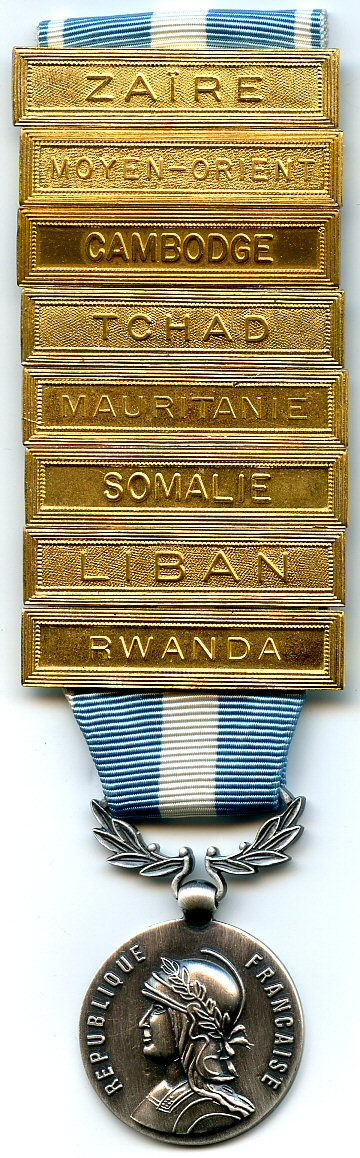
Overseas Medal

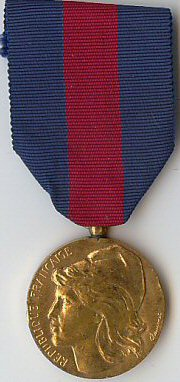
Medal for voluntary military service

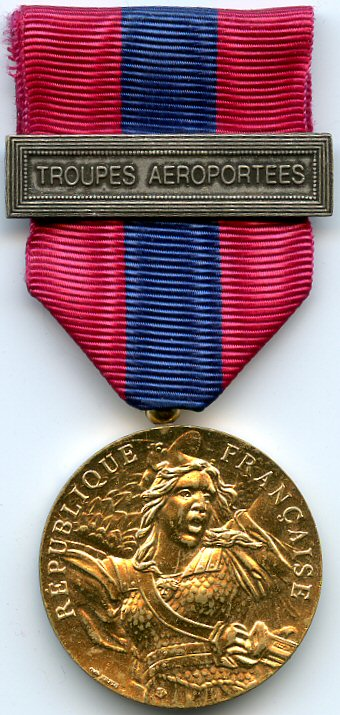
National Defence Medal

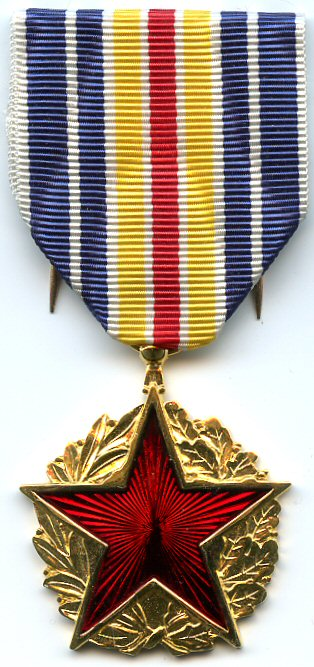
Medal for the War Wounded

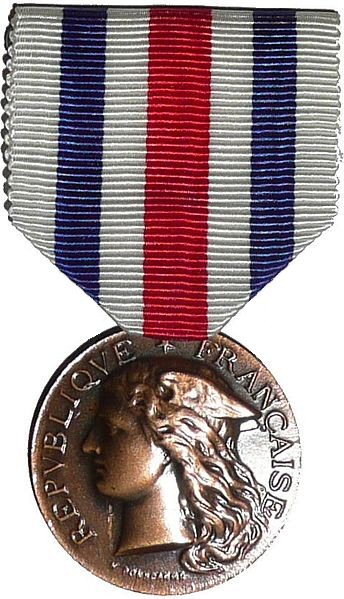
Military Health Service honour medal

== Rewards for acts of courage and ministerial honour medals ==
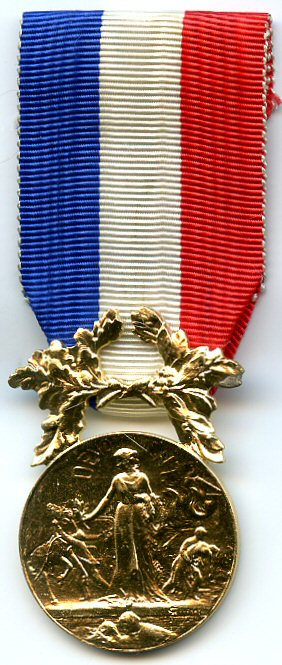
Honour medal for courage and devotion

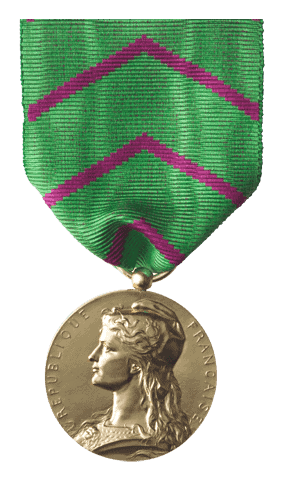
Honour medal for penitentiary administration

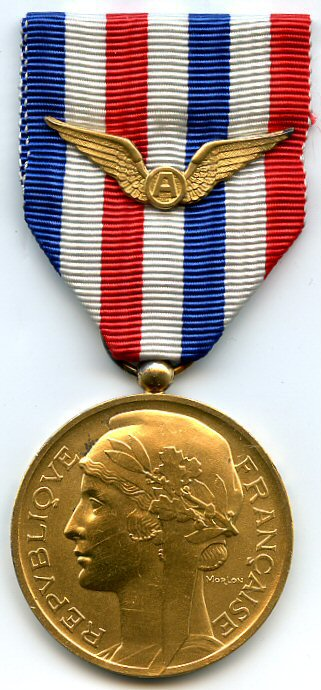
Honour medal of Aeronautics

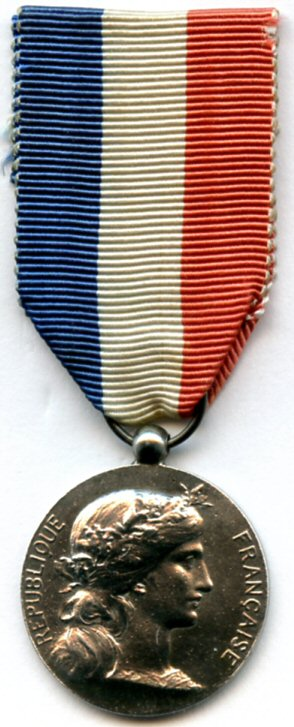
Honour medal of Foreign Affairs

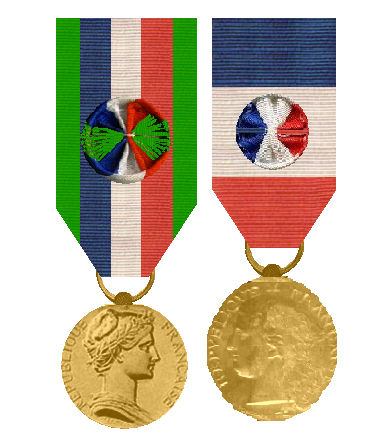
Honour medal of agriculture

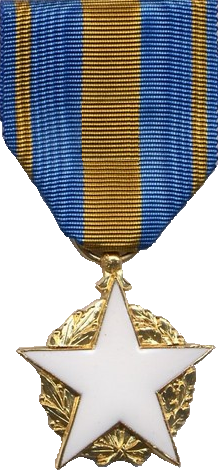
Insignia for wounded civilians

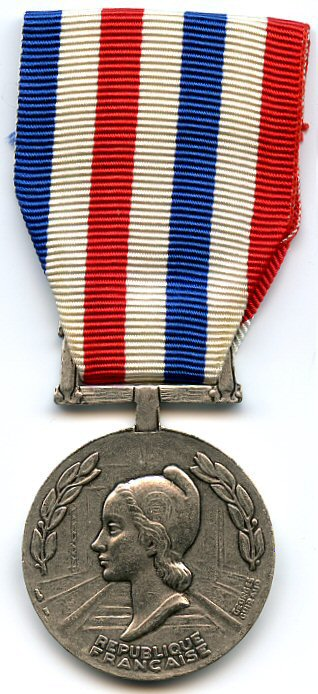
Honour medal for railways

Honour medal for Indirect Taxation

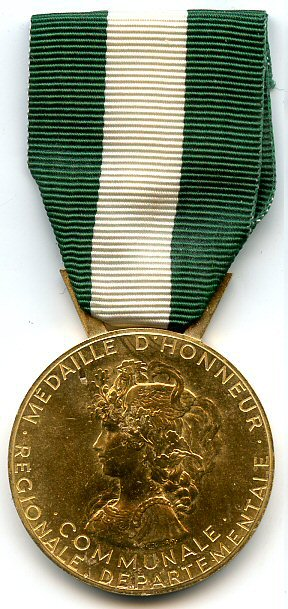
Regional, departmental and municipal honour medal

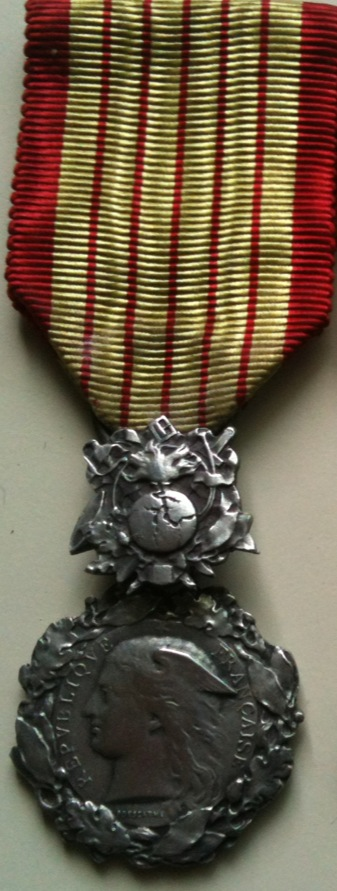
Customs honour medal

Honour medal for water and forests

Honour medal of teaching of the first degree

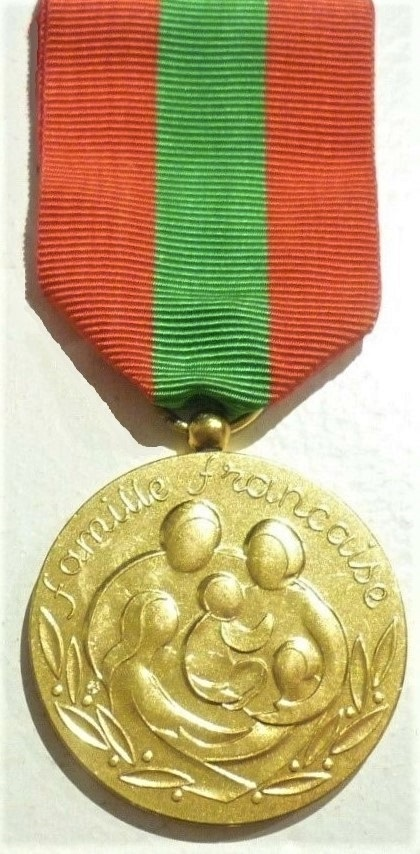
Medal of the French Family

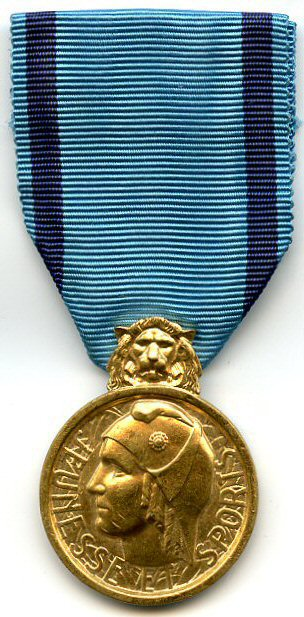
Honour medal for youth, sports and associative engagements

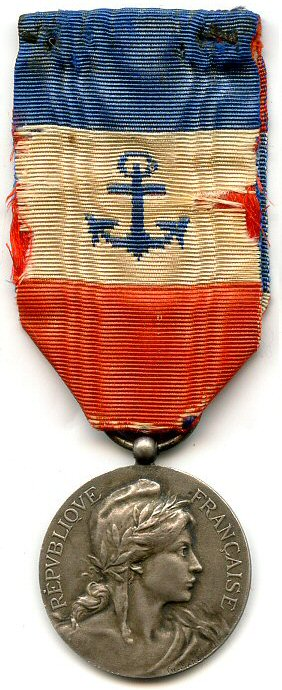
Honour medal for merchant seamen and fisheries

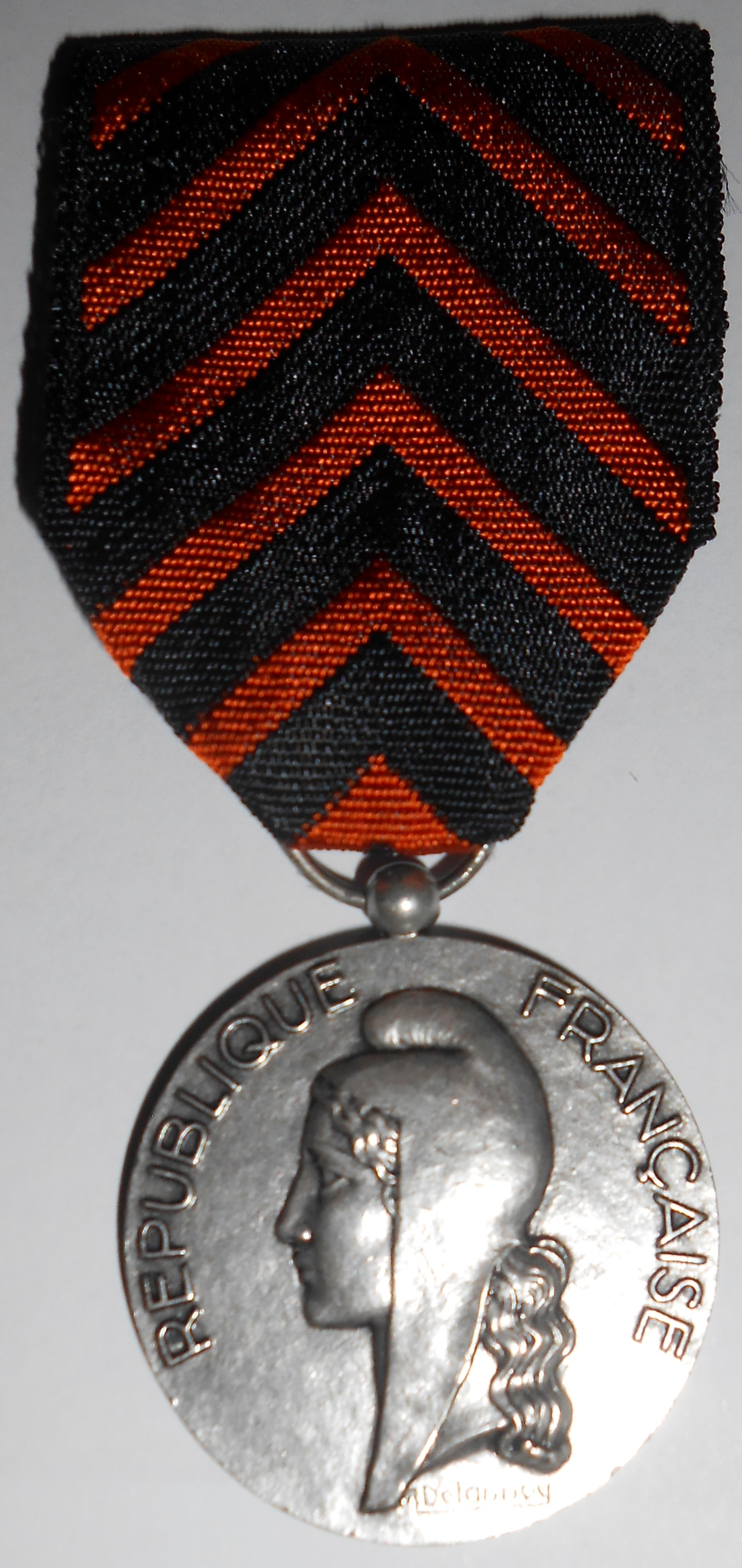
Medal of Mines

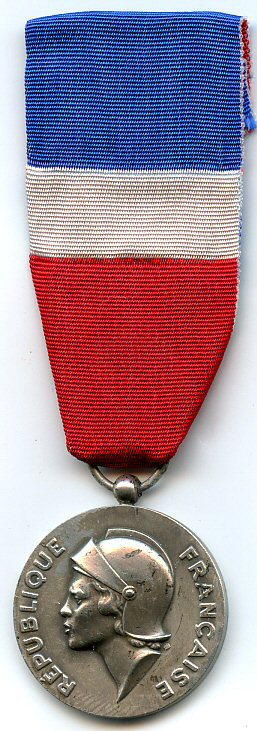
Honour medal for civilian personnel of the defense ministry

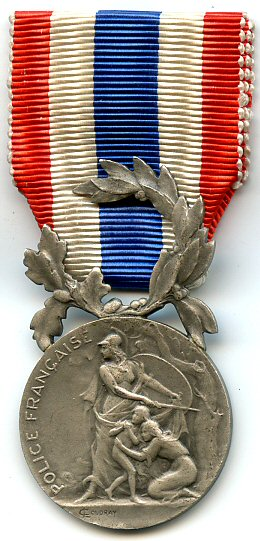
Honour medal of the National Police

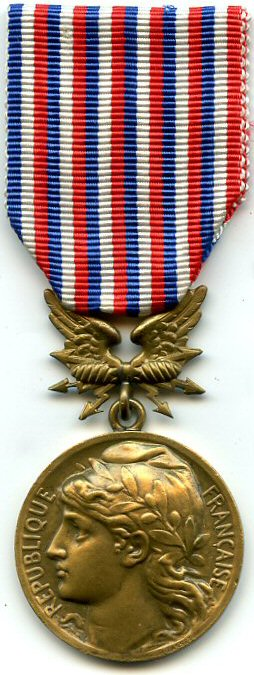
Honour medal for post and telecommunications

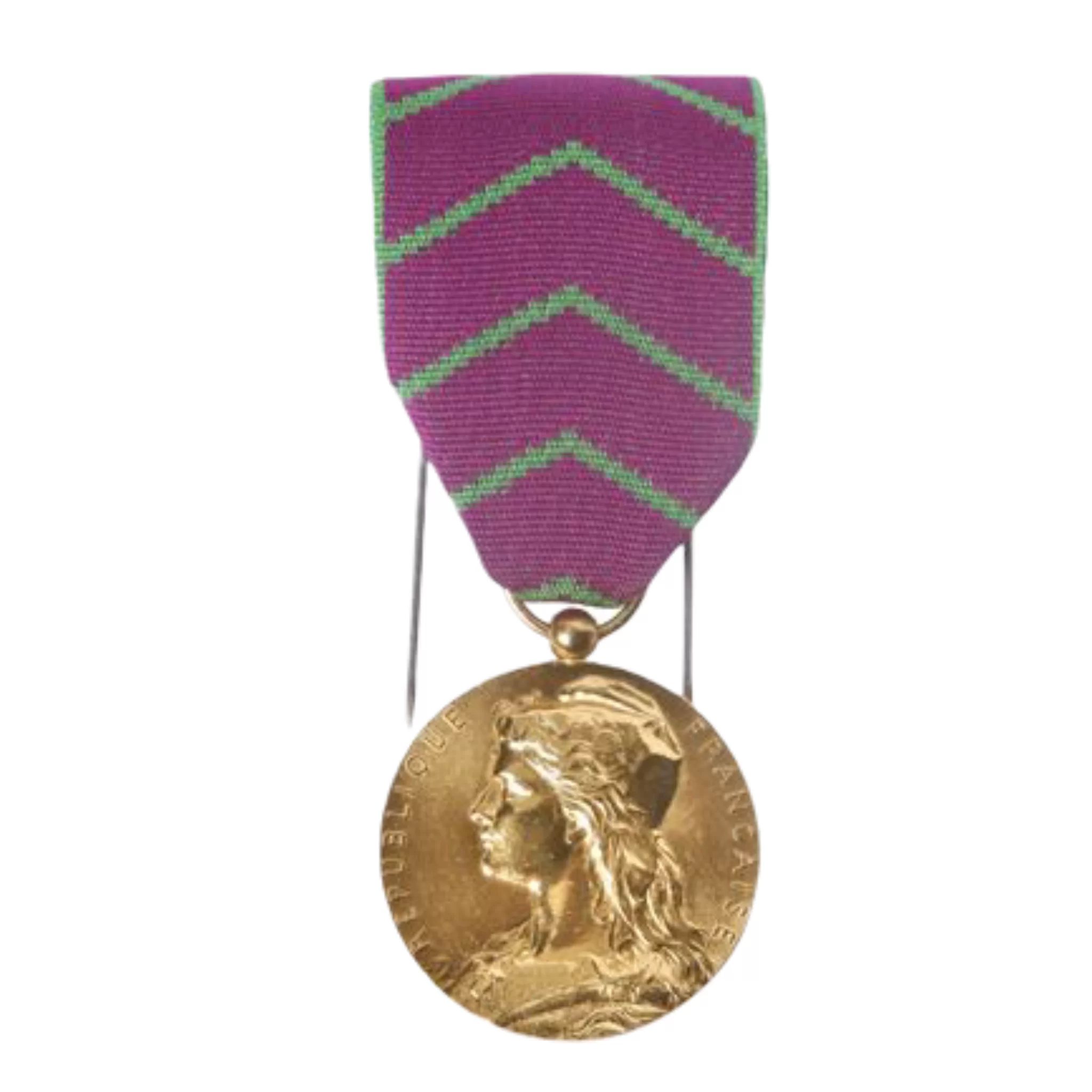
Honour medal for judicial protection of youth

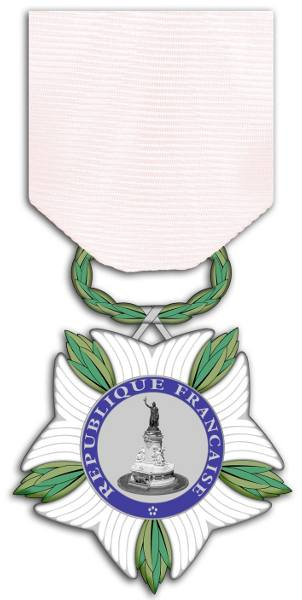
National Recognition Medal of Victims of Terrorism

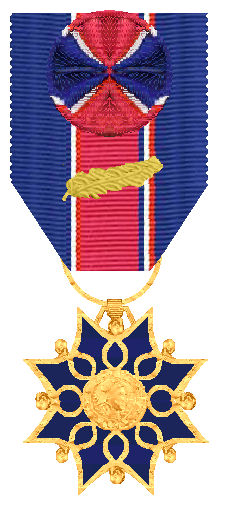
Honour medal for Health and Social Affairs

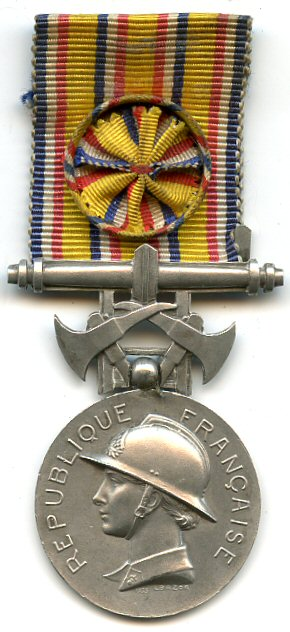
Honour medal for firefighters

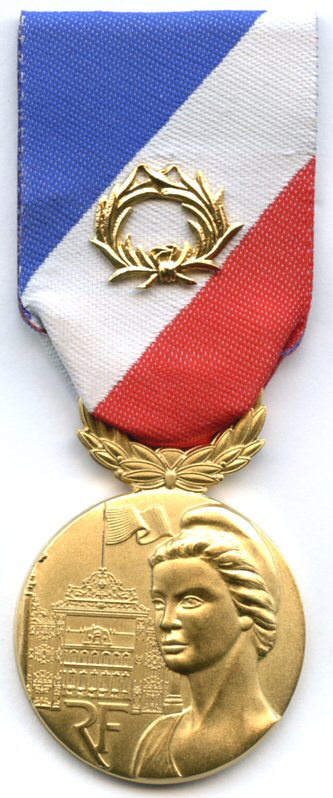
Medal for internal security

Honour medal for judicial services

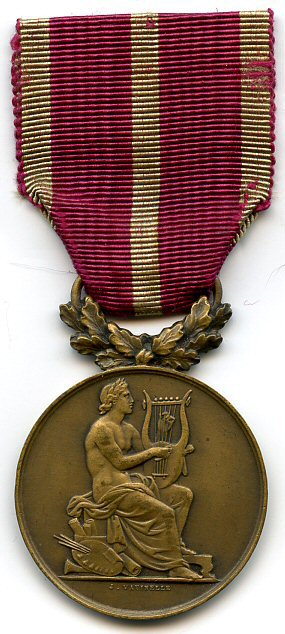
Honour medal for music and chorale societies

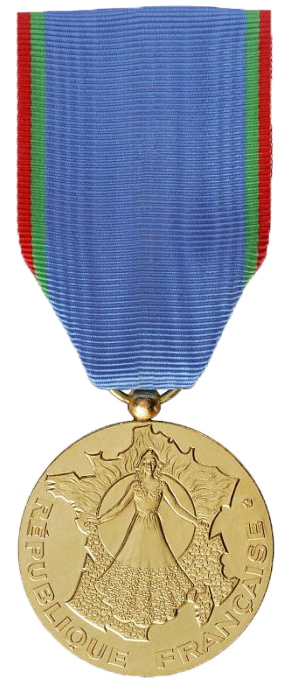
Medal of Tourism

Honour medal for road transport

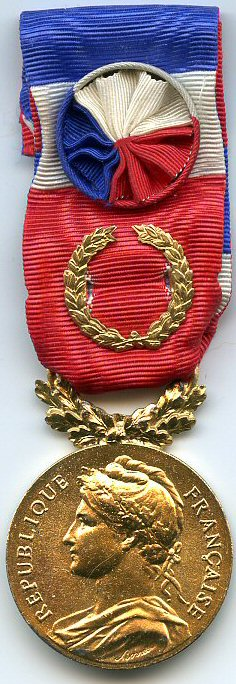
Honour medal for work

Honour medal for public works

== Commemorative medals ==
=== 19th century ===
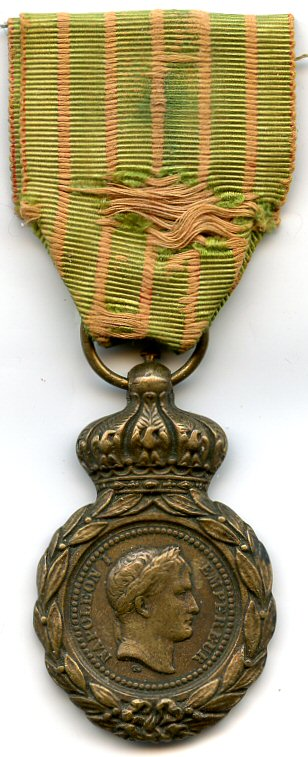
Saint Helena Medal

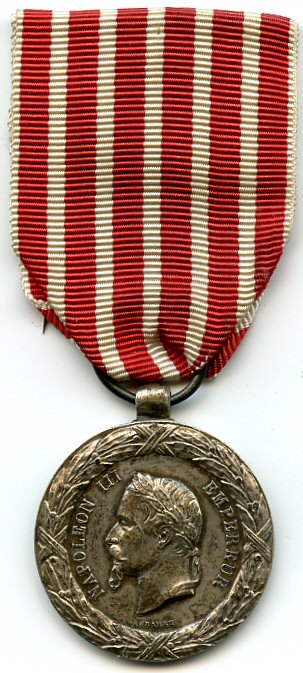
Commemorative medal of the 1859 Italian Campaign

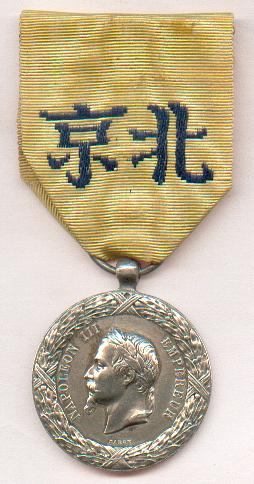
Commemorative medal of the 1860 China Expedition

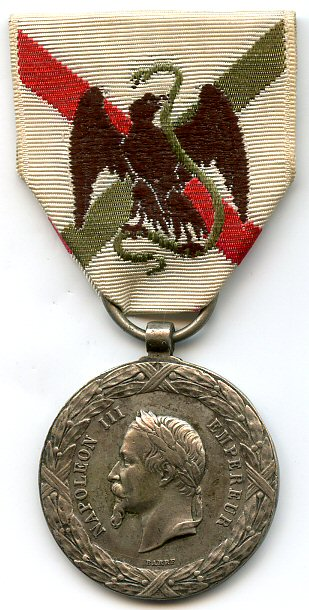
Commemorative medal of the 1862 Mexico Expedition

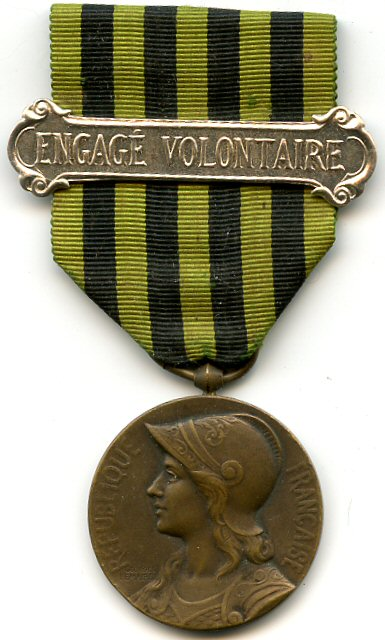
Commemorative medal of the 1870–1871 War

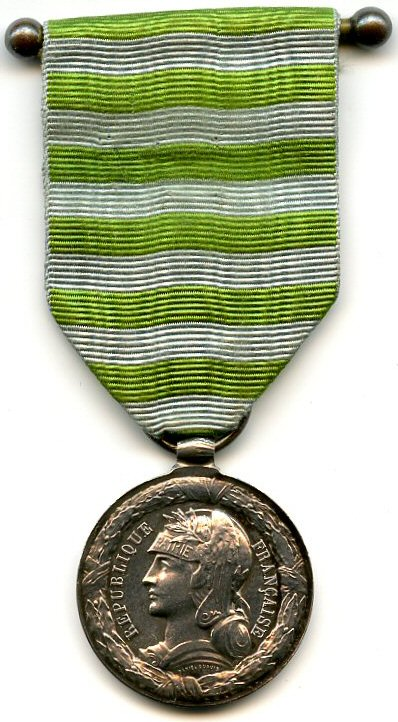
First Madagascar campaign medal 1883

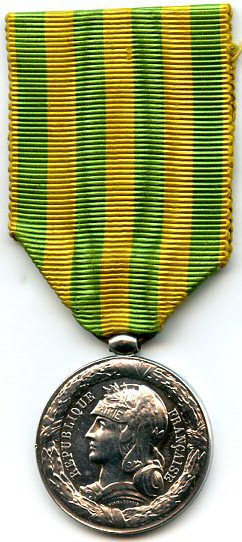
Tonkin Expedition commemorative medal 1883–1885

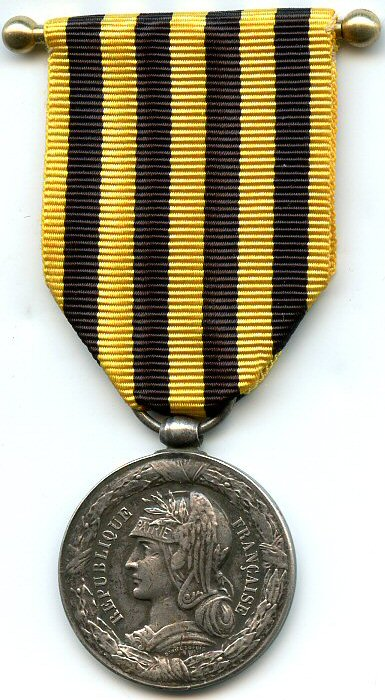
Dahomey Expedition commemorative medal 1892

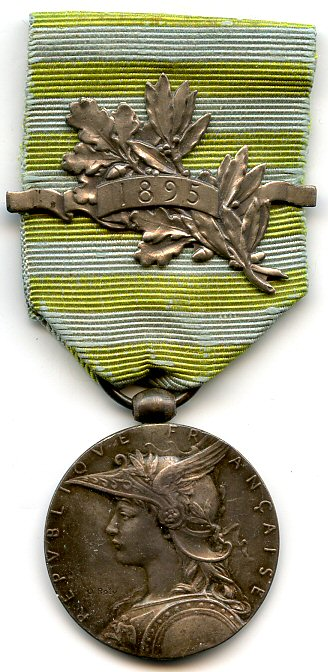
Second Madagascar campaign medal 1894–1895

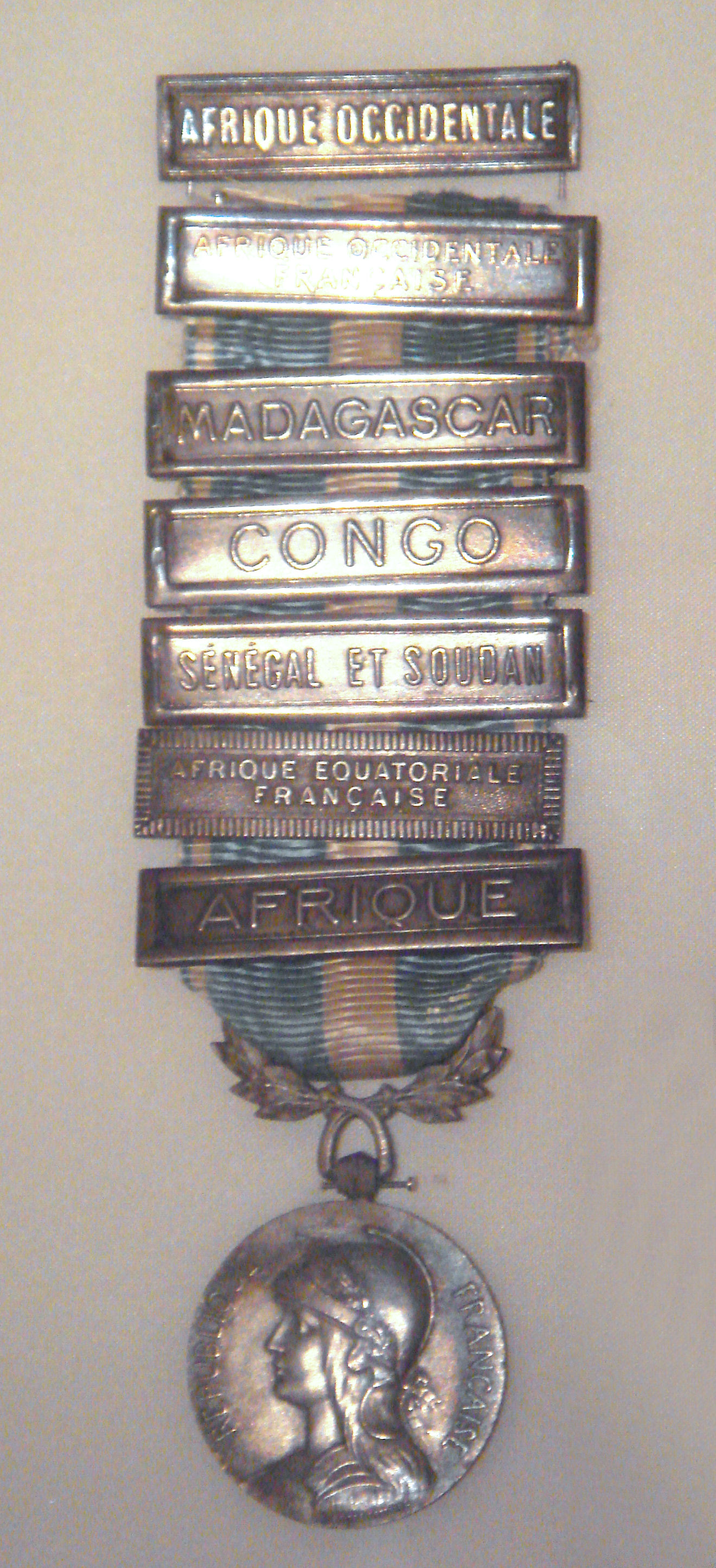
Colonial Medal

=== 1900–1914 ===
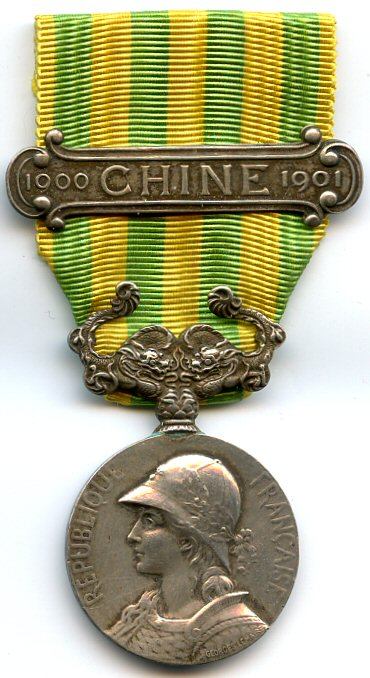
1901 China expedition commemorative medal

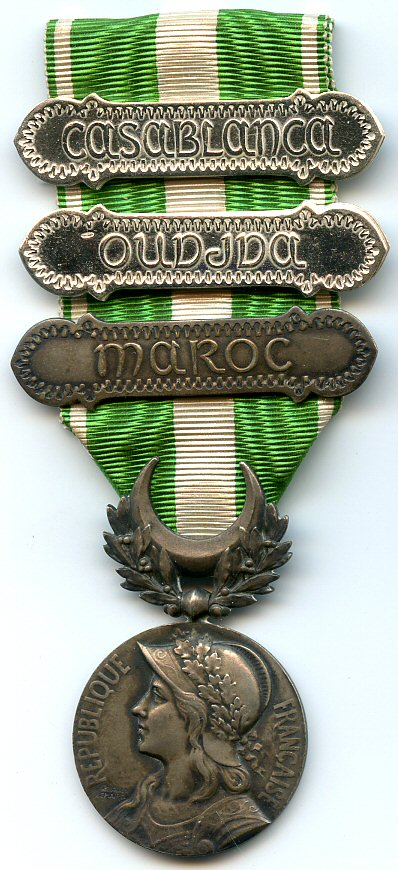
Morocco commemorative medal (1909)

=== First World War (1914–1918) ===
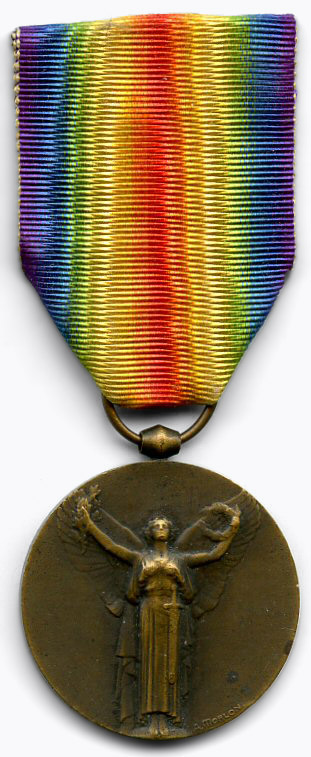
1914–1918 Inter-Allied Victory medal

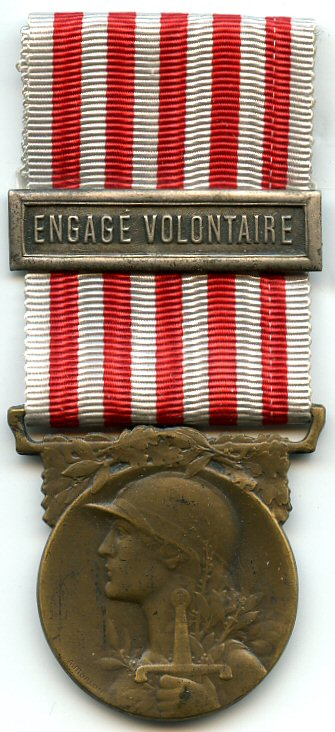
1914–1918 Commemorative war medal

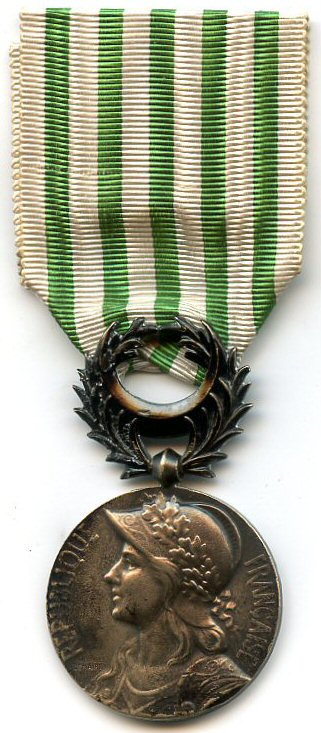
Dardanelles campaign medal

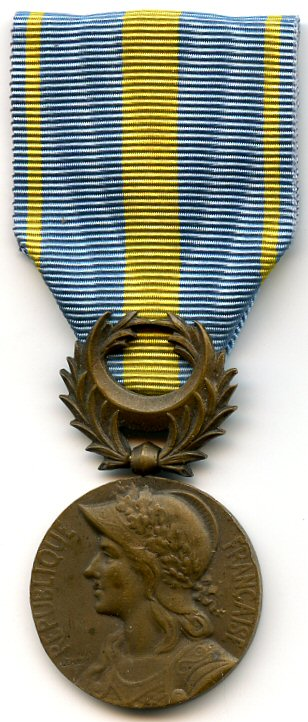
Orient campaign medal

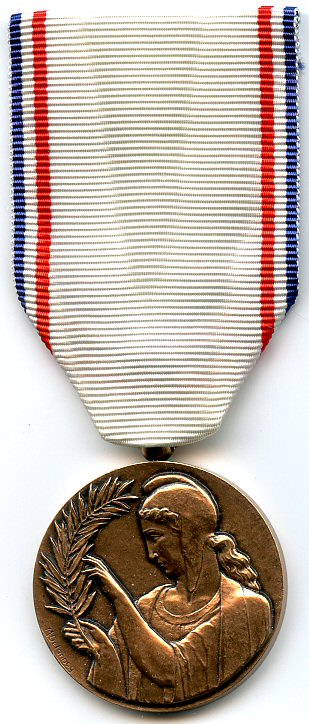
Medal of French Gratitude

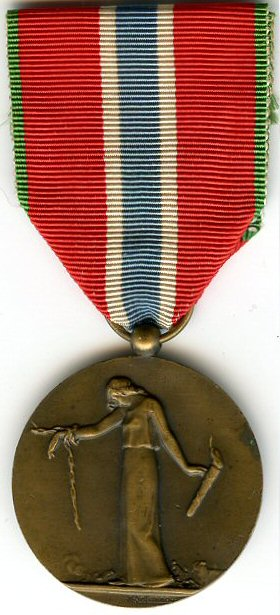
Medal for civilian prisoners, deportees and hostages of the 1914-1918 Great War

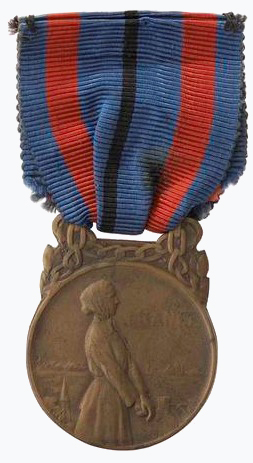
Medal for victims of the invasion

=== Between the two wars (1918–1939) ===
Syria-Cilicia commemorative medal

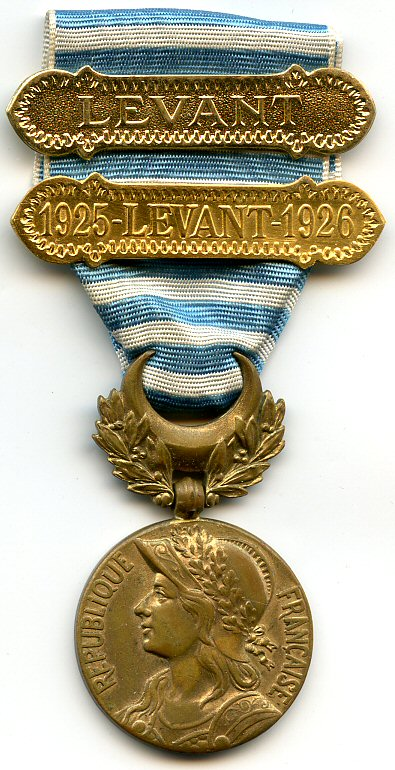

=== Second World War (1939–1945) ===
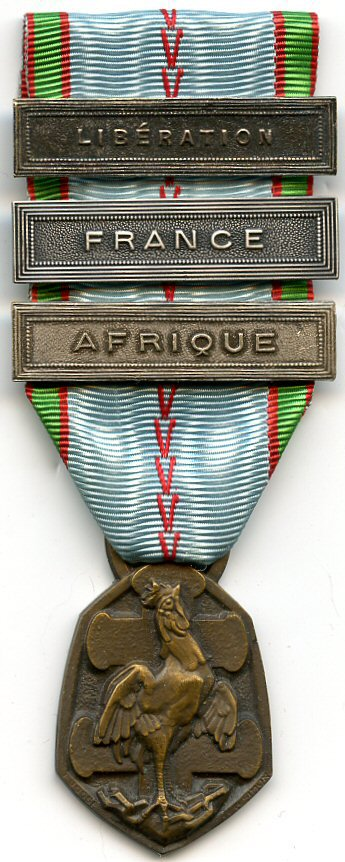
1939–1945 Commemorative war medal

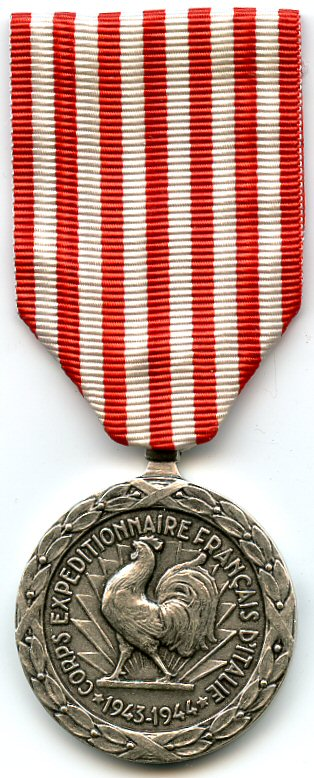
1943–1944 Italian campaign medal

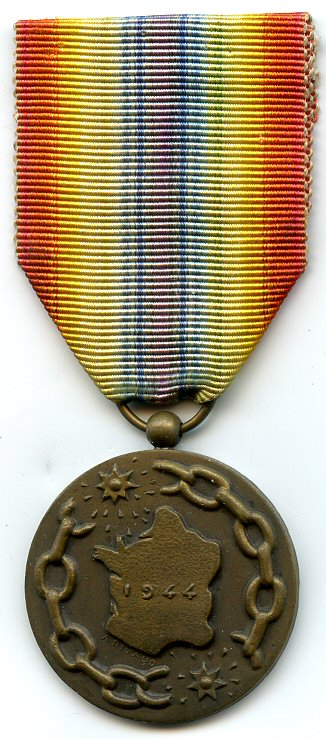
Medal of a liberated France

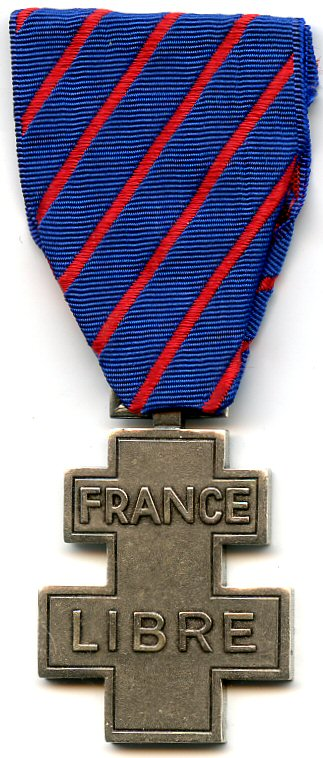
Commemorative medal for voluntary service in Free France

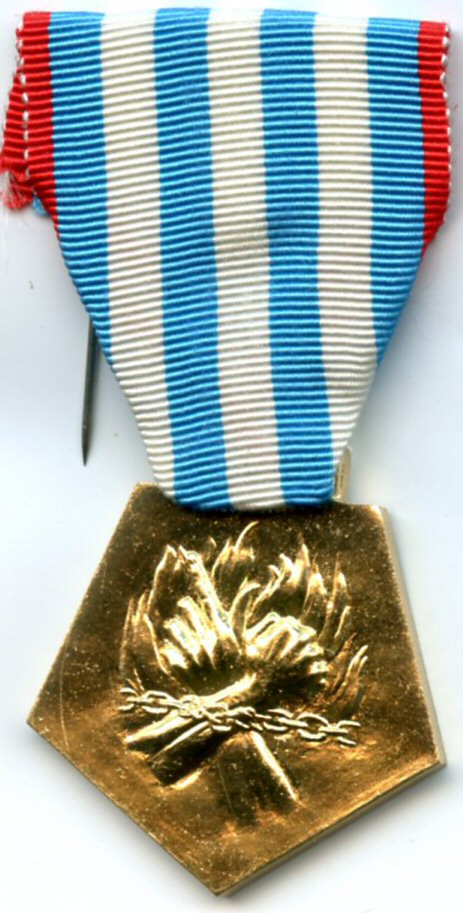
Deported for acts of resistance medal

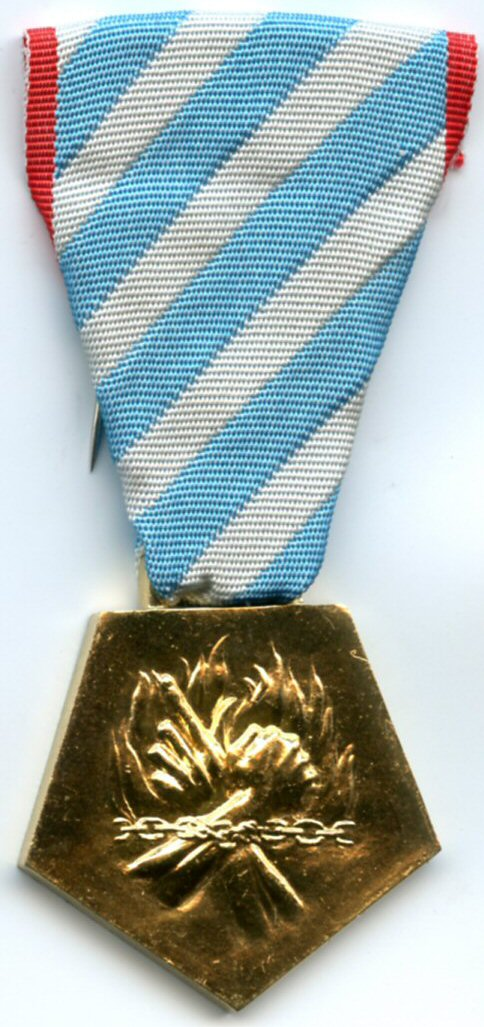
Interned for acts of resistance medal

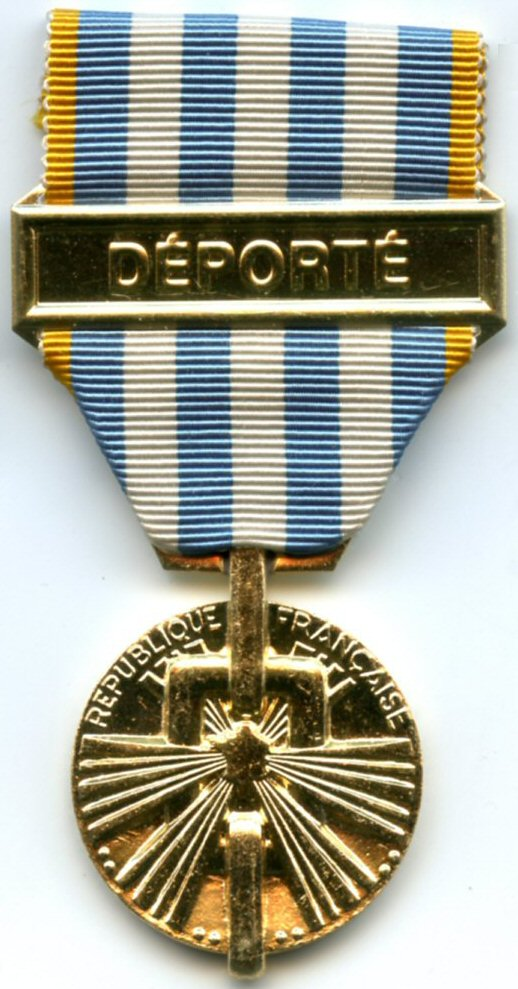
Political deportee's medal

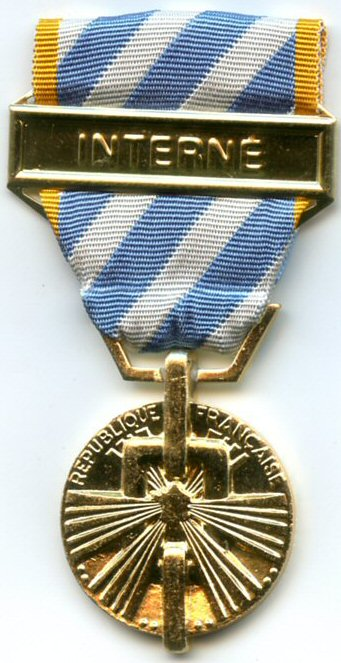
Political internee's medal

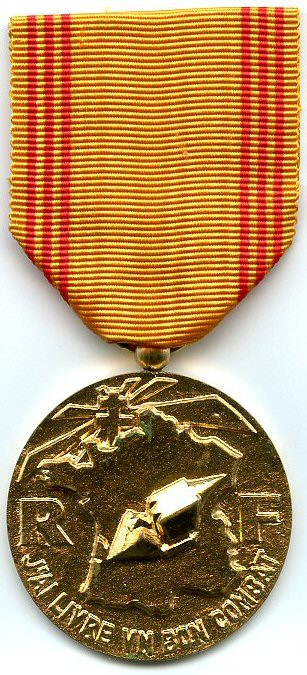
Recusant's insignia

=== After 1945 ===
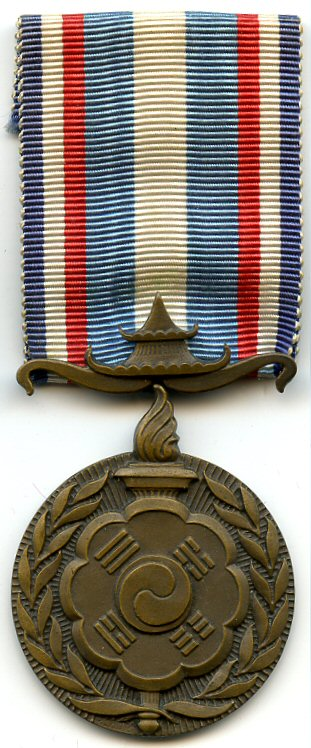
United Nations operations in Korea commemorative medal

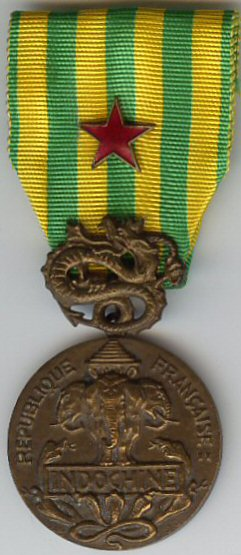
Indochina Campaign commemorative medal

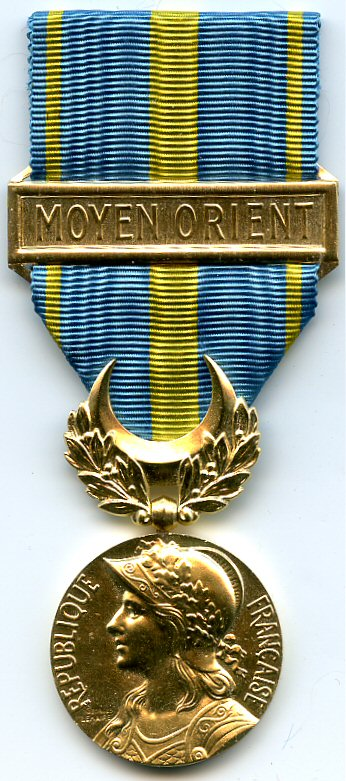
Middle East operations commemorative medal

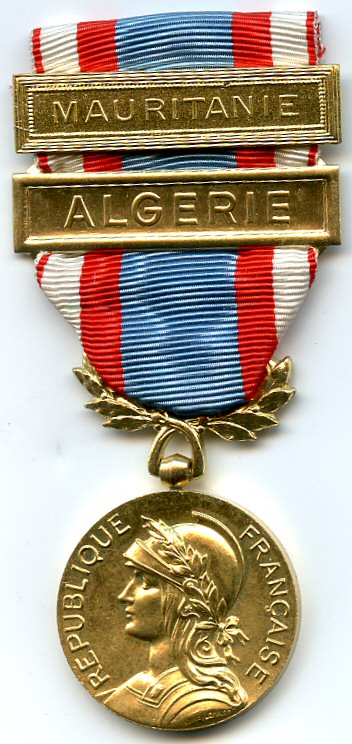
North Africa Security and Order Operations Commemorative Medal

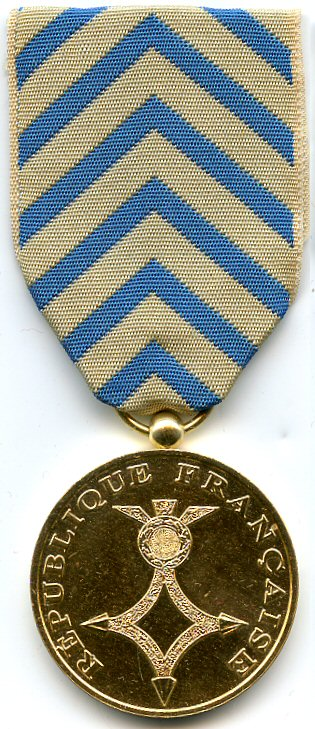
North Africa medal

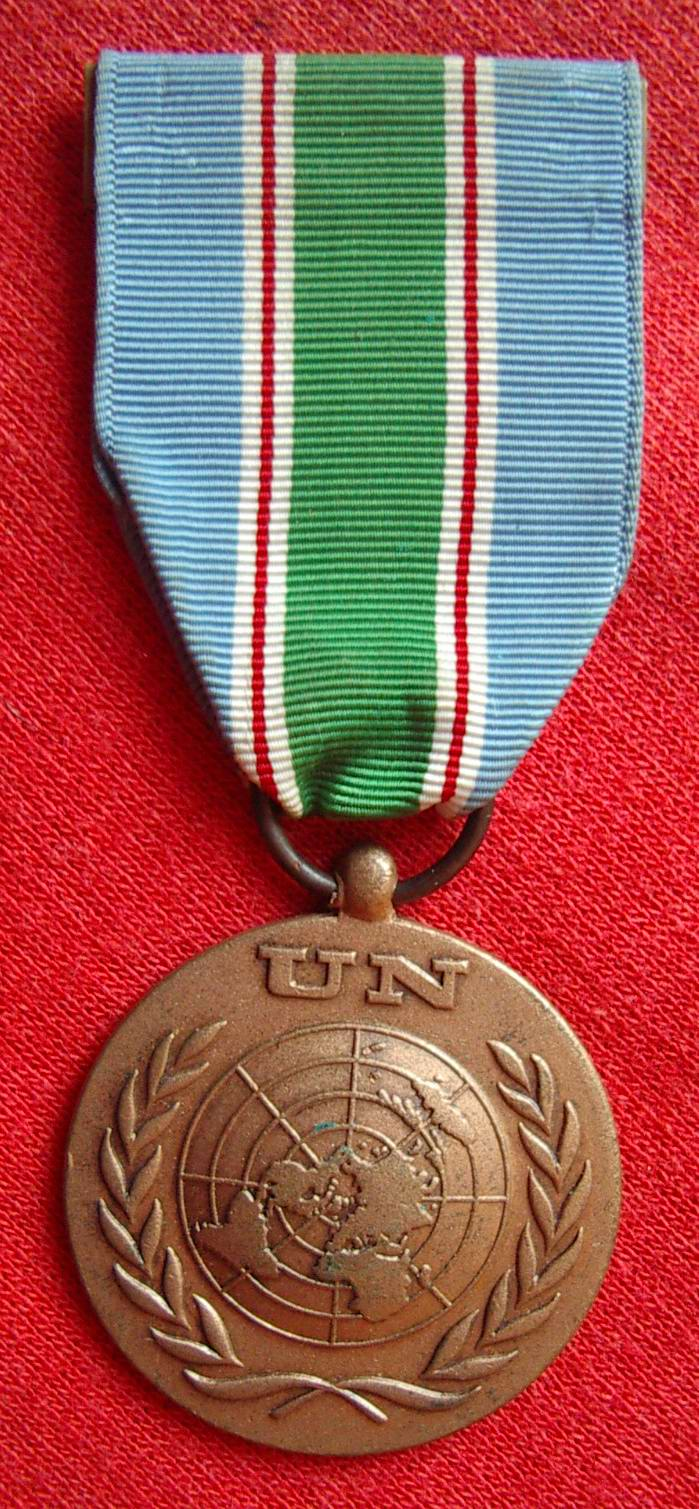
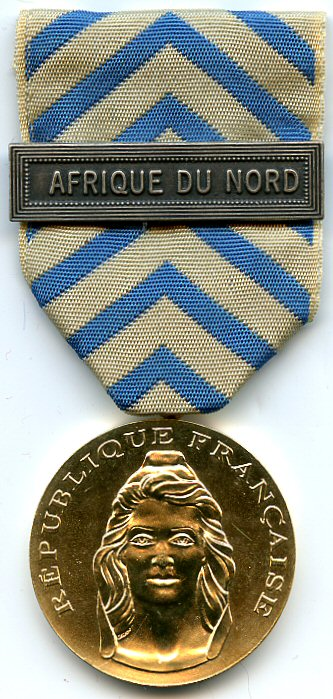
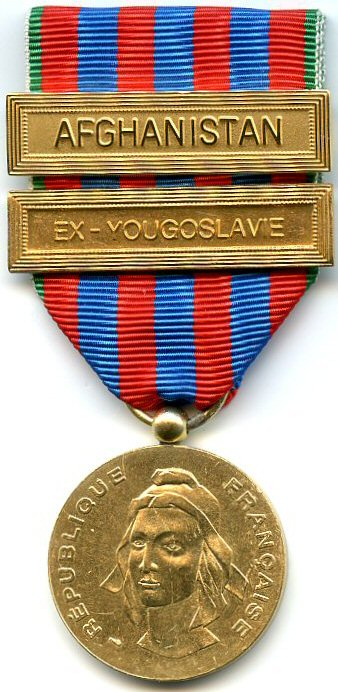
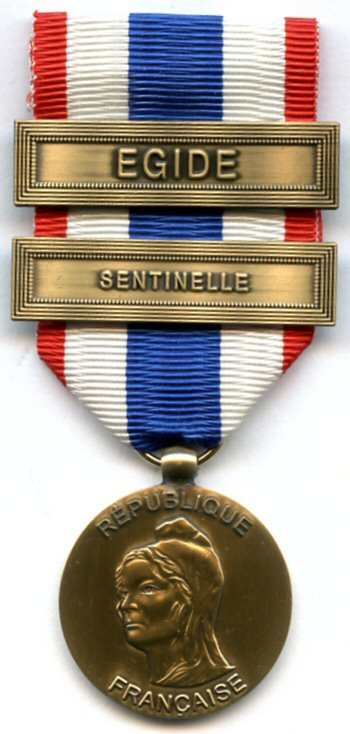
United Nations Interim Force in Lebanon medal	Medal of the Nation's Gratitude	French commemorative medal	Medal for the Military Protection of the Territory
Médaille de la FINUL (recto)

== Territorial order ==
Order of Tahiti Nui

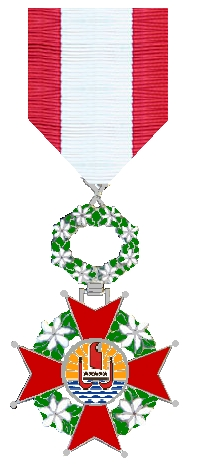

== Abolished or dormant decorations ==
=== Royal orders ===
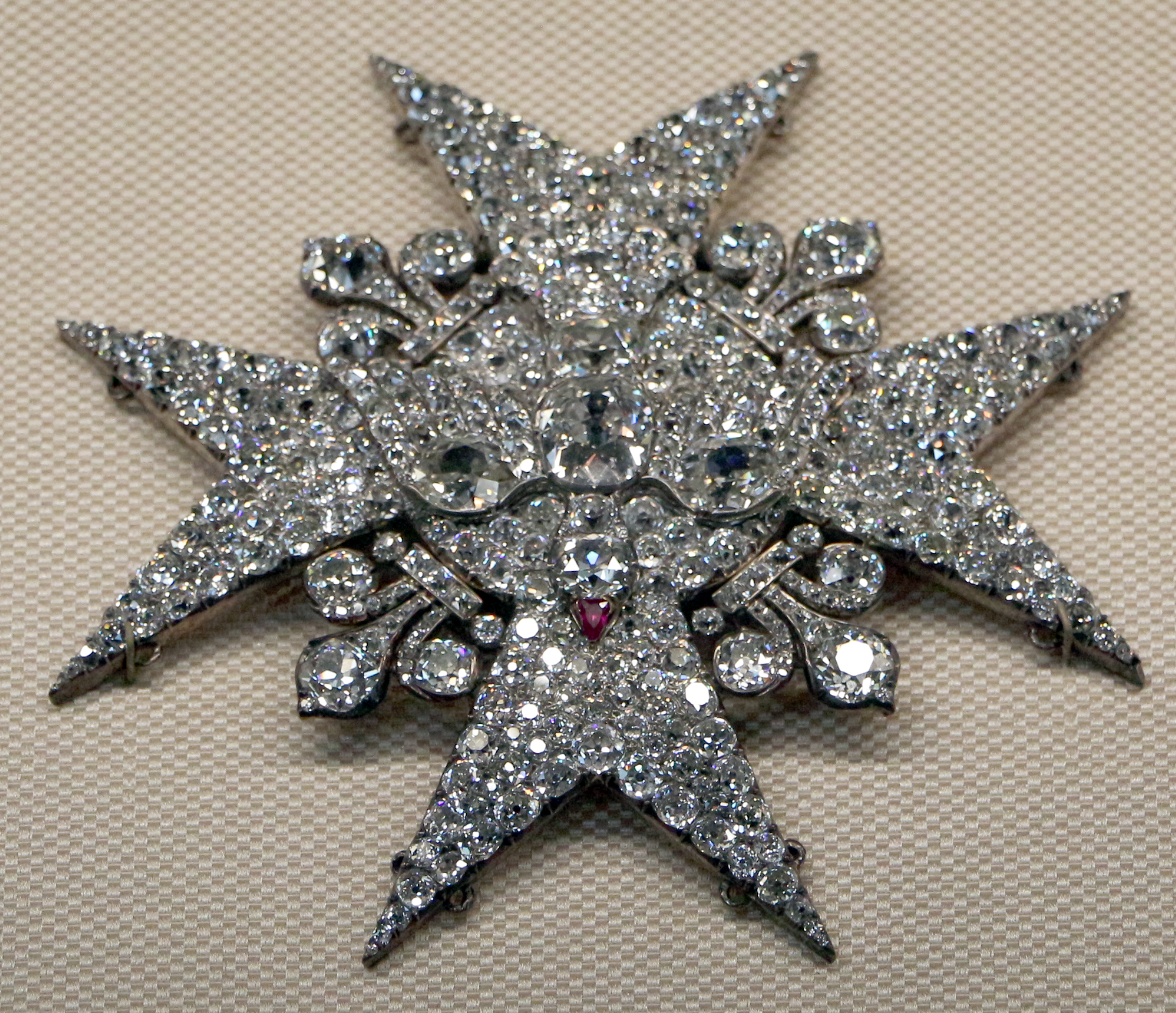
Order of the Holy Spirit

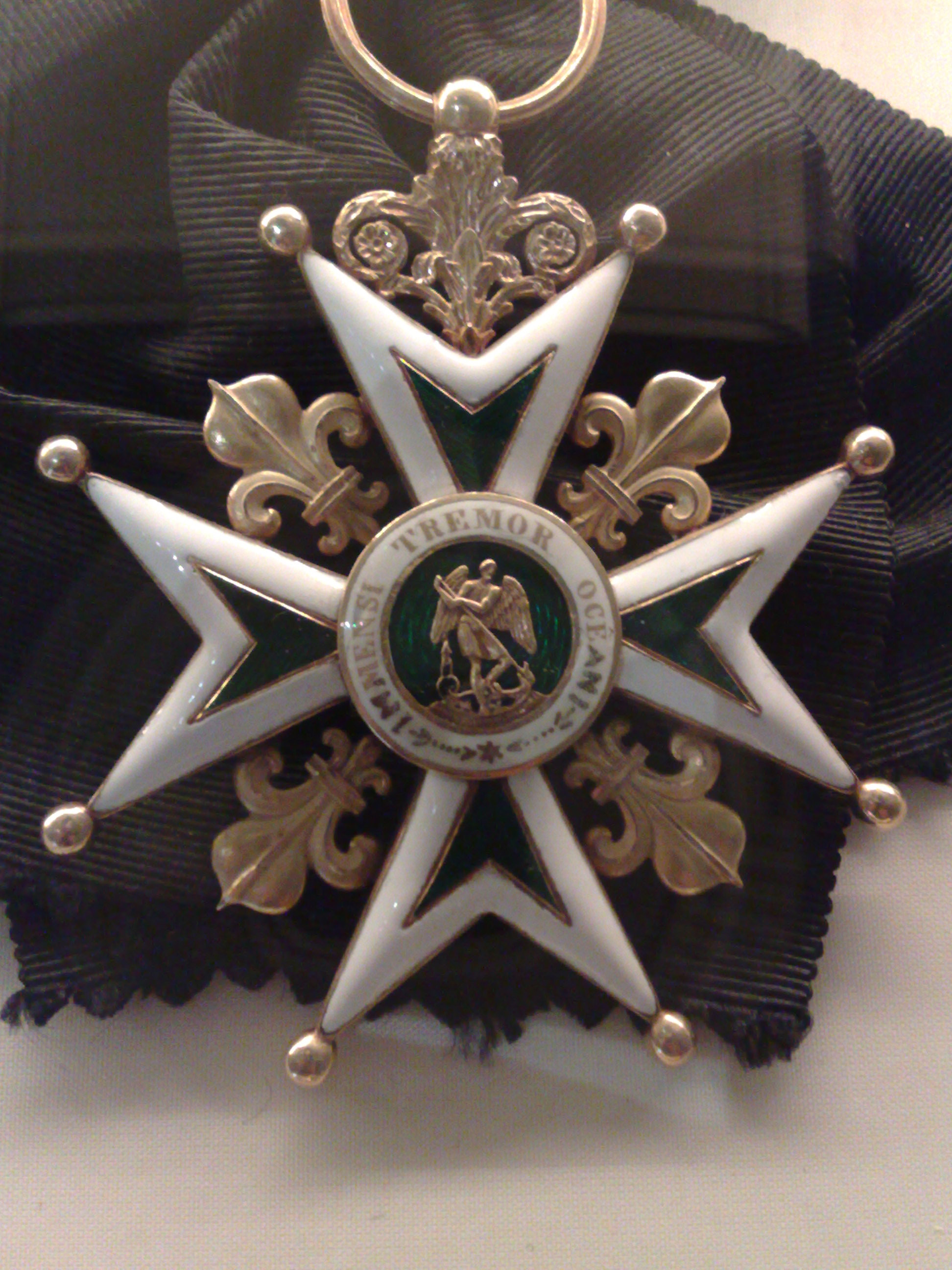
Order of Saint Michael

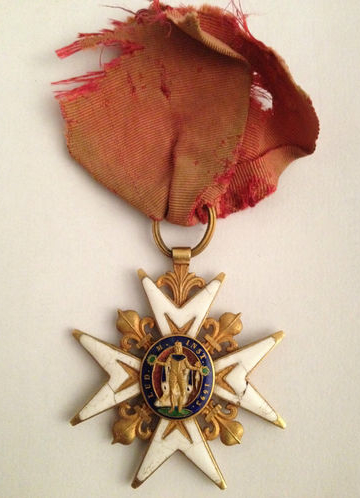
Order of Saint Louis

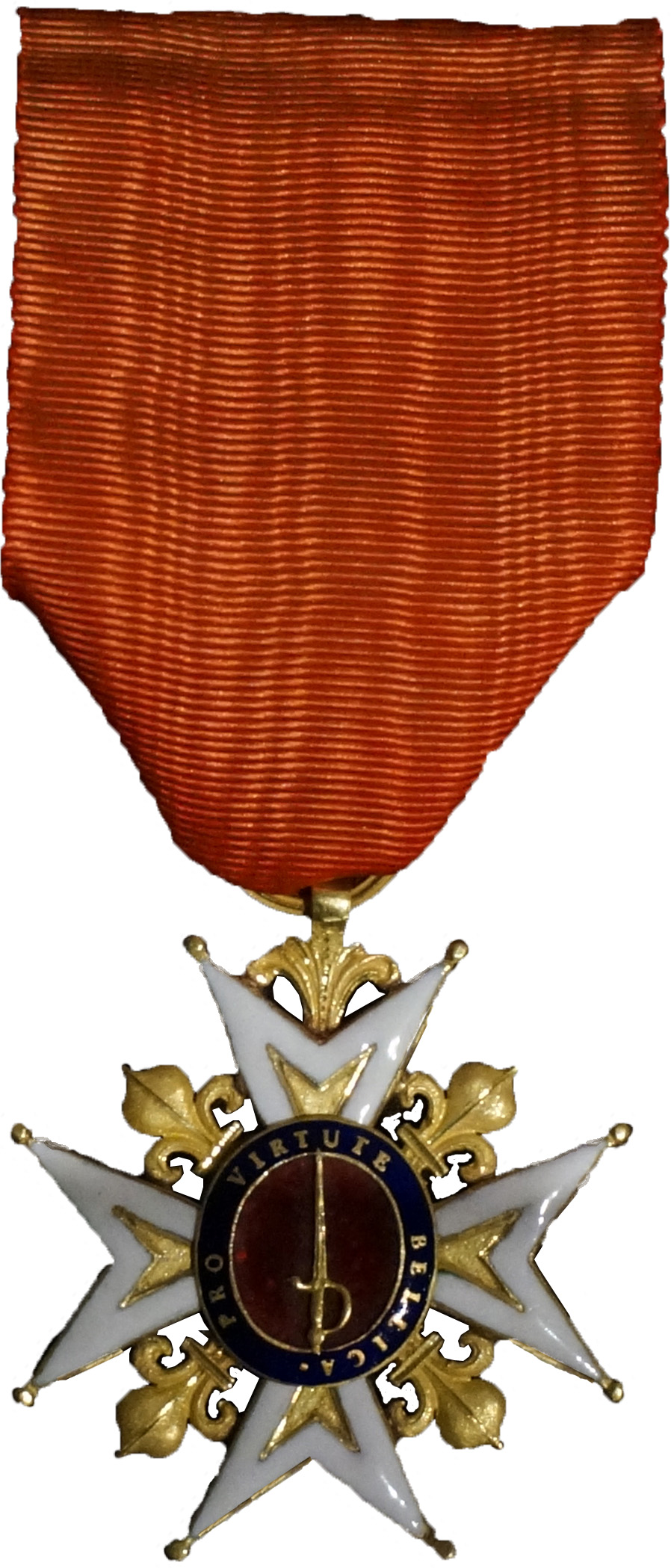
Order of Military Merit

=== Ministerial orders ===
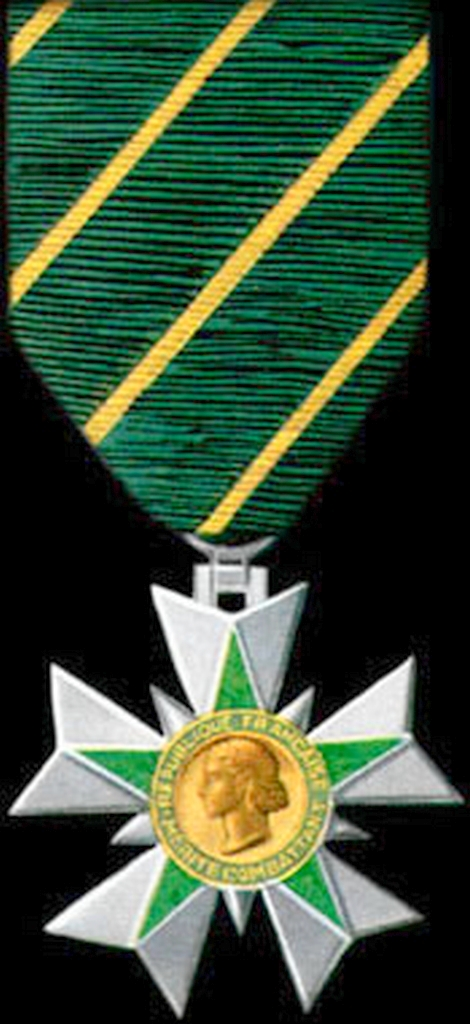
Order of Combatant Merit

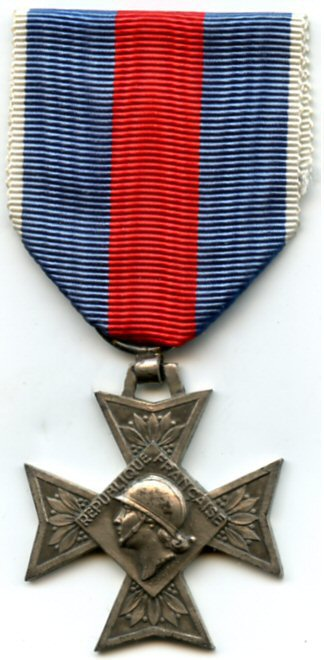
Order of Military Merit

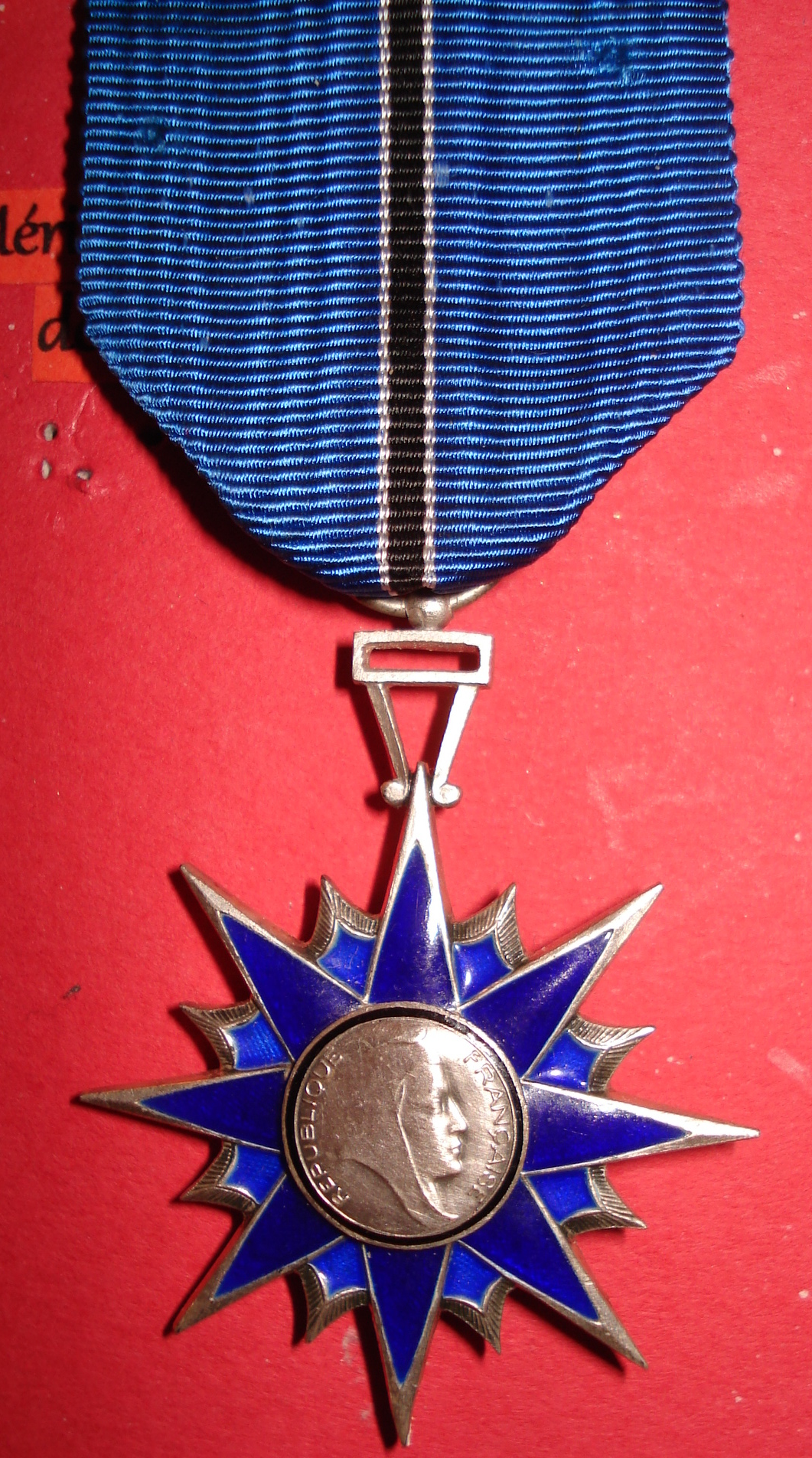
Order of Civil Merit

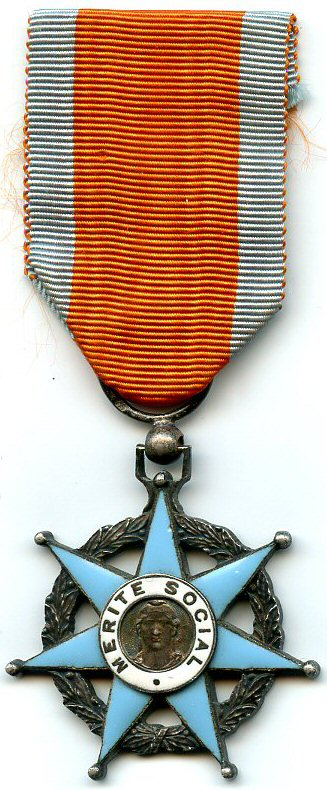
Order of Social Merit

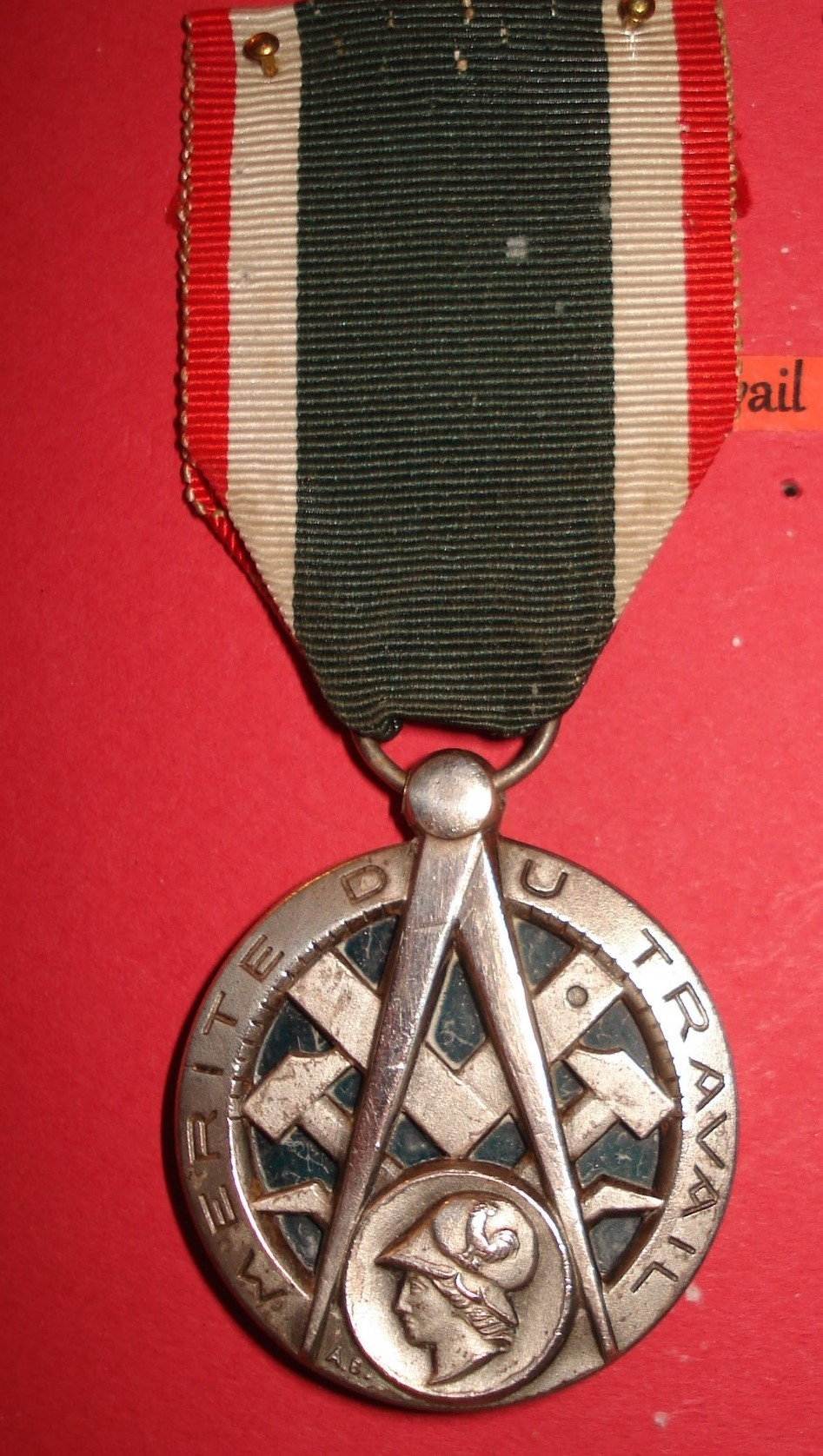
Order of Working Merit

Order of Touristic Merit

Order of the National Economy

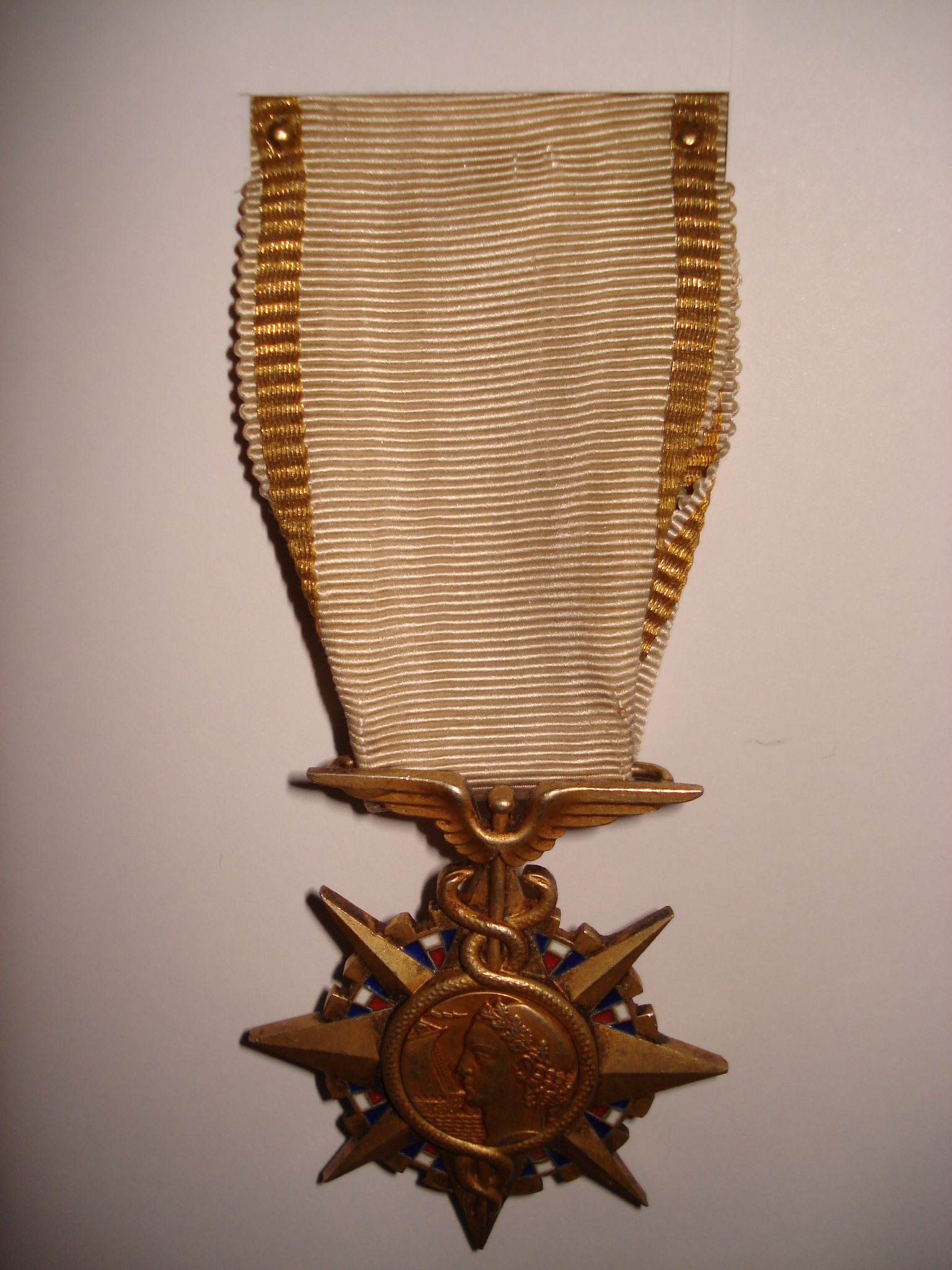
Order of Commercial & Industrial Merit

Order of Artisanal Merit

Order of Public Health

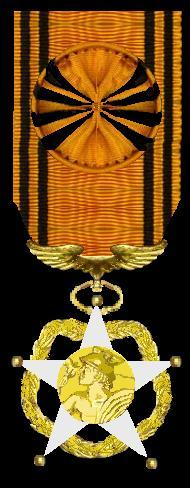
Order of Postal Merit

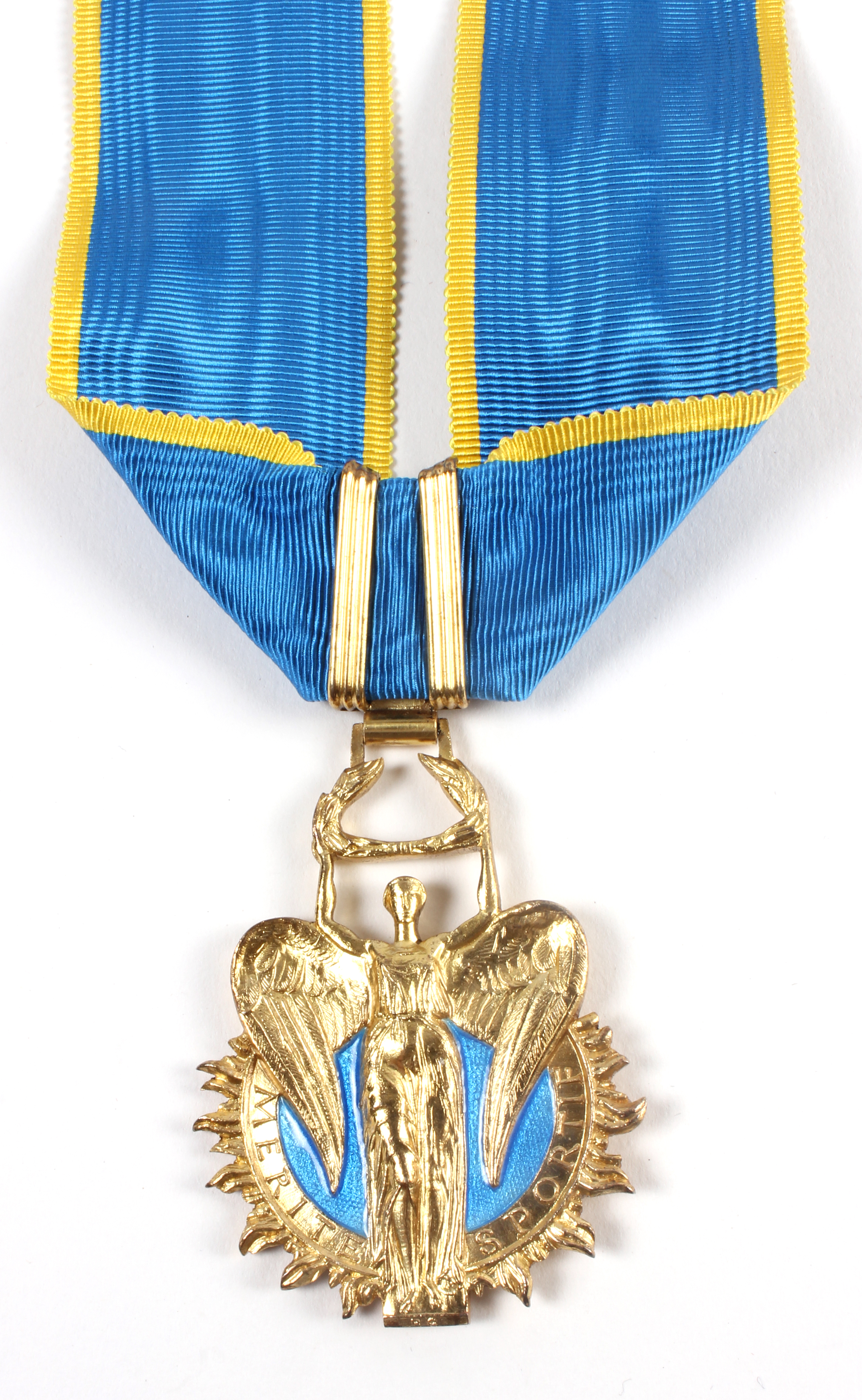
Order of Sporting Merit

=== Colonial orders ===
Indochinese Order of Merit

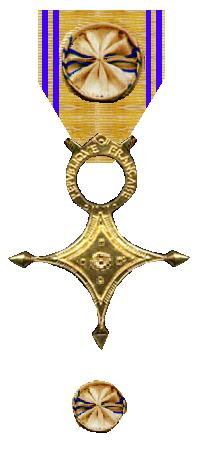
Saharan Order of Merit

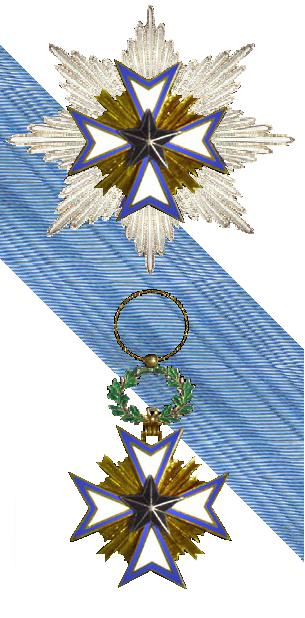
Order of the Black Star

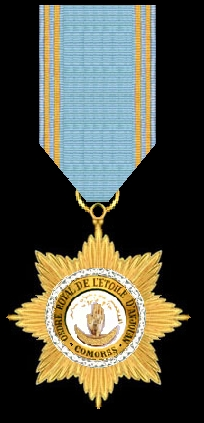
Order of the Star of Anjouan

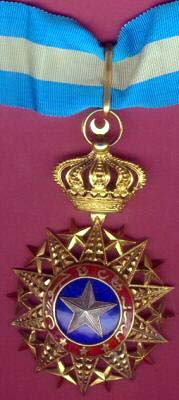
Order of Nichan el Anouar

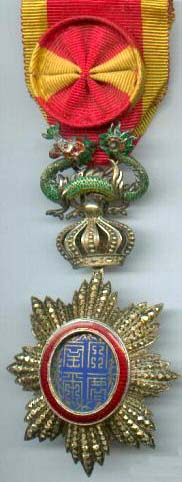
Order of the Dragon of Annam

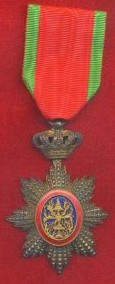
Royal Order of Cambodia

=== Rewards for acts of courage and ministerial honour medals ===
Departmental and municipal honour medal

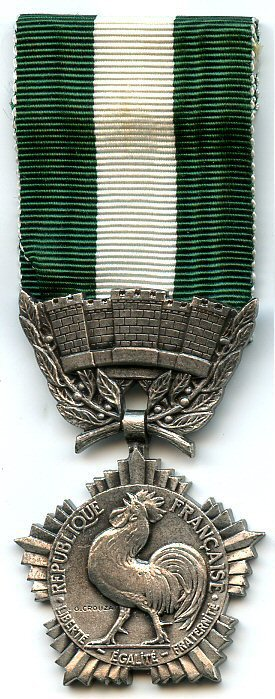

== See also ==
- Historical orders, decorations, and medals of France
- Ribbons of the French military and civil awards
