= Orders, decorations, and medals of Morocco =

The orders, decorations, and medals of Morocco constitute the honours system consisting of state and royal award established to recognize civilians and military personnel. The King of Morocco serves as the Grand Master of all national orders, and appointments are administered by the Chancery of State Honors.

== National Orders ==
- Order of Muhammad (Arabic: الوسام المحمدي, Wissam al-Muhammadi), the highest national award of the Kingdom of Morocco, exclusively reserved for monarchs, foreign heads of state, members of the Moroccan Alawi dynasty, and international dignitaries.
- Order of the Throne (Arabic: وسام العرش, Wissam al-Arsh), rewards distinguished services rendered to the state.
- Order of Ouissam Alaouite (Arabic: الوسam العلوي, Wissam al-Alawi), rewarded to civilians and military officers who have displayed heroism in combat or have contributed meritorious service to the Moroccan state.

== Royal Moroccan Armed Forces Awards ==
Medal Name	Established	Purpose
Order of Military Merit	1910	Honors eminent and meritorious military service across five separate classes.
Military Medal	Mid-20th Century	Conferred upon non-commissioned officers and enlisted personnel for extraordinary acts of valor or discipline in active duty.

=== Commemorative Campaign Medals ===
Medal Name	Established	Purpose
Dahir Medal		
Sherifien Order of Military Merit		
Military Service Order		
Military Medal		
Sherifian Military Merit Medal		
Sherifian Civil Merit Medal		
Peace Medal		
Valour Medal for the Congo		
Green March Medal	1975	Awarded to participants and organizers of the Green March demonstration into Western Sahara.
Medal for Lebanon	1976	Honoring Moroccan deployments to the Republic of Lebanon.
Medal for the Algerian-Moroccan War	1964	Honoring servicemen who took part in the Sand War.
Commemorative Medal for the Algerian-Moroccan Campaign		Honoring servicemen who took part in the Sand War.
Middle Eastern Commemorative Medal	1975	Honoring servicemen who took part in the Yom Kippur War.
Zaire Commemorative Medal	1979	Honoring servicemen who took part in Shaba I.
Medal for Volunteers	1975	
Dakhla Medal		
Polisario Commemorative Medal		
Medal of Honour of the Police		
Postal Merit Medal		
Medal of Honour of Prisons		
Fireman's Medal		
Medal for Customs Officials		
Sports Merit Medal		
Wound Medal		

== Civil and Professional Merit Orders ==
To recognize contributions across civic society, industry, and governance, Morocco employs specialized ministerial and functional orders:

- Order of Civil Merit
- Order of Labour
- Order of National Merit
- Order of Cultural Merit
- Order of Merit for Sport
- Postal Merit Medal

== See also ==
- Monarchy of Morocco
- Orders, decorations, and medals of France
