= Croix de guerre 1914–1918 (France) =

Croix de Guerre 1914–1918
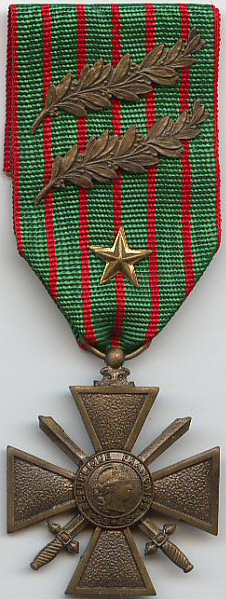
- 1914–1918 Croix de guerre with three citations 2 bronze palms 1 silver gilt star
- Type: Medal
- Awarded for: Military duty during World War I, valor in battle
- Presented by: France
- Status: Closed
- Established: 2 April 1915

Highlights
- Total: 2,065,000
- Ribbon bar & streamer of the French Croix de guerre 1914–1918

Precedence
- Next (higher): Médaille nationale de reconnaissance aux victimes du terrorisme
- Next (lower): Croix de guerre 1939–1945

Fourragère of the Croix de guerre 1914-1918

The Croix de guerre 1914–1918 (English: War Cross) was a French military decoration, the first version of the Croix de Guerre. It was created to recognize French and allied soldiers who were cited for valorous service during World War I, similar to the British mentioned in dispatches but with multiple degrees equivalent to other nations' decorations for courage.

Soon after the outbreak of World War I, French military officials felt that a new military award had to be created. At that time, the Citation du jour ("Daily Citation") already existed to acknowledge soldiers, but it was just a sheet of paper. Only the Médaille Militaire and Legion of Honour were bestowed for courage in the field, due to the numbers now involved, a new decoration was required in earnest. At the end of 1914, General Boëlle, Commandant in Chief of the French 4th Army Corps, tried to convince the French administration to create a formal military award. Maurice Barrès, the noted writer and parliamentarian for Paris, gave Boëlle support in his efforts.

On 23 December 1914, the French parliamentarian Georges Bonnefous proposed a legislative bill to create the Croix de la Valeur Militaire ("Cross of Military Valour") signed by 66 other parliamentarians. Émile Driant, a parliamentarian who served in the war zone during much of this time, became its natural spokesman when he returned to the legislature. On 18 January 1915, Driant submitted this bill but the name of the military award was renamed to Croix de guerre ("War Cross"). After parliamentary discussions, the bill was adopted on 2 April 1915.

World War I began in 1914 and ended in 1918, so the final name adopted is "Croix de guerre 1914–1918".

== Award statute ==
Every Croix de guerre awarded carries at least one citation for gallantry or courage to a member of any rank of the French military or of an allied army. Ribbon devices indicate the importance or degree of the soldier's role during the action cited. The lowest degree is represented by a bronze star and the highest degree is represented by a bronze palm. The cross is only awarded once and subsequent actions worthy of citations will be limited to additional ribbon devices on the originally received insignia. The number of ribbon devices on a Croix de guerre is not limited, some awards, especially to ace fighter pilots, had extremely long ribbons with dozens of stars and palms.

The Croix de guerre 1914-1918 was attributed to:

- French and allied soldiers individually cited for a wartime act of gallantry;
- Civilians and militarized personnel individually cited for a wartime act of gallantry;
- Automatically to soldiers and civilians not specifically cited for a Croix de guerre but awarded the Légion d'honneur or Médaille militaire for the highest acts of wartime valour and gazetted in the Official Journal of the French Republic;
- Collectively, to army units, ships or air squadrons;
- To cities and villages, martyrs of war, destroyed, ravaged or bombed by the enemy (2952 towns received the Croix de guerre 1914–1918, in this case, always awarded with palm).

Soldiers who were/are members of units recognized by a collective unit award of the Croix de guerre may wear the Fourragère of the Croix de guerre 1914-1918 as long as they remain members of that unit. Soldiers who actively took part as members of units during repeated feats of arms recognized by more than one collective award of the Croix de guerre may continue to wear the fourragère even after leaving the meritorious unit. Battle streamers in the colours of the Croix de guerre 1914-1918 are affixed to the colours of recipient units.

== Award description ==
The cross was designed by the sculptor Paul-Albert Bartholomé. It is 37 mm wide, Florentine bronze cross pattée, with two crossed swords pointing up between the arms. The obverse centre medallion bears the relief image of the French Republic in the form of the bust of a young woman wearing a Phrygian cap surrounded by the circular relief inscription RÉPUBLIQUE FRANCAISE (FRENCH REPUBLIC). Not knowing how long the war would last, the reverse centre medallion bears the dates 1914–1915, 1914–1916, 1914–1917 and finally 1914–1918.

The cross is suspended by a ring through a suspension loop cast atop the upper cross arm. It hangs from a 37 mm wide green silk moiré ribbon with seven narrow 1,5 mm wide vertical red stripes evenly spaced and two 1 mm red edge stripes.

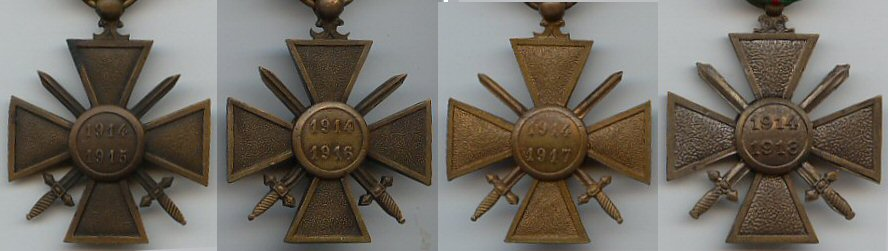
Reverse of the four variants of the World War I Croix de Guerre

The lowest degree is represented by a bronze star and the highest degree is represented by a silver palm. The cross was worn with the appropriate attachments to signify the singular or multiple awards of the decoration.

- Bronze star (étoile de bronze): for those who were mentioned at the regiment, battalion or brigade level.
- Silver star (étoile d'argent): for those who were cited at the division level.
- Silver gilt star (étoile vermeil): for those who were cited at the corps level.
- Bronze palm (palme de bronze): for those who were cited at the army level.
- Silver palm (palme d'argent): could be worn in lieu of five bronze palms.

=== Award Ribbons ===
Étoile de bronze
Bronze star

Étoile d'argent
Silver star

Étoile de vermeil
Silver gilt star

Palme de bronze
Bronze palm

Palme d'argent
Silver palm

== Notable French recipients (partial list) ==
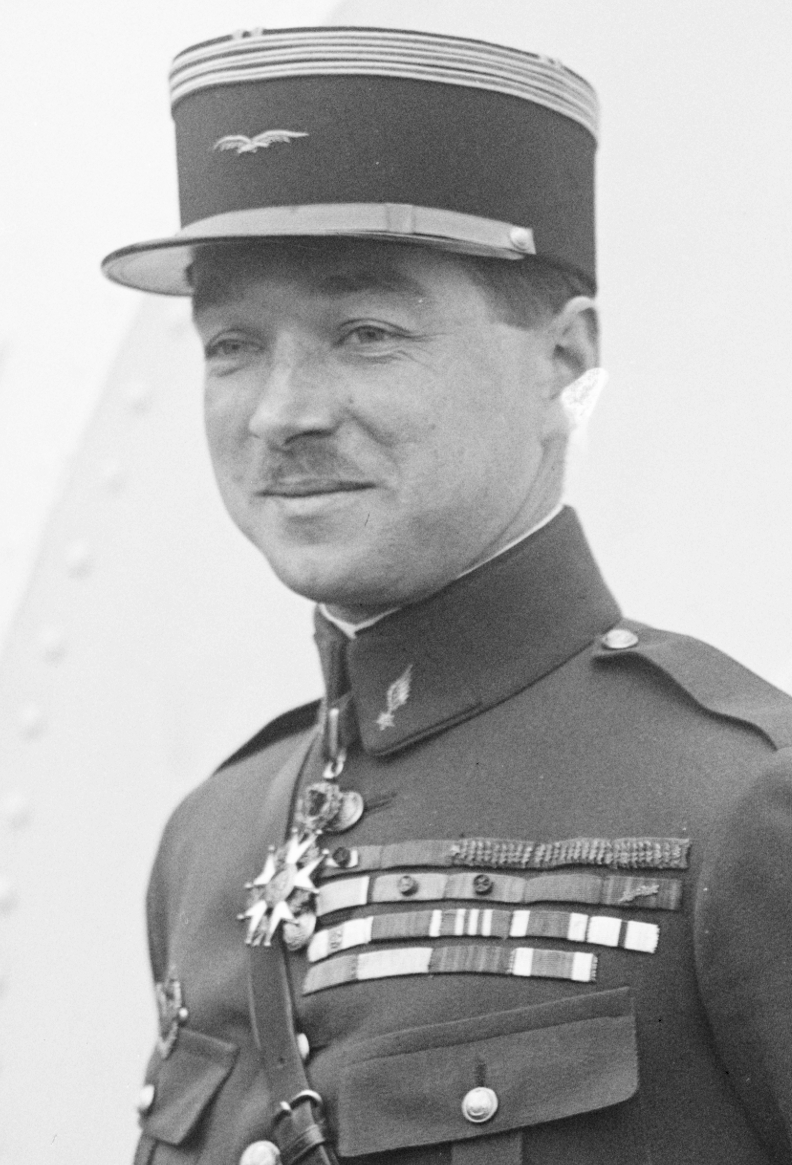
Colonel René Fonck, a recipient of the 1914-18 Croix de guerre with 29 citations

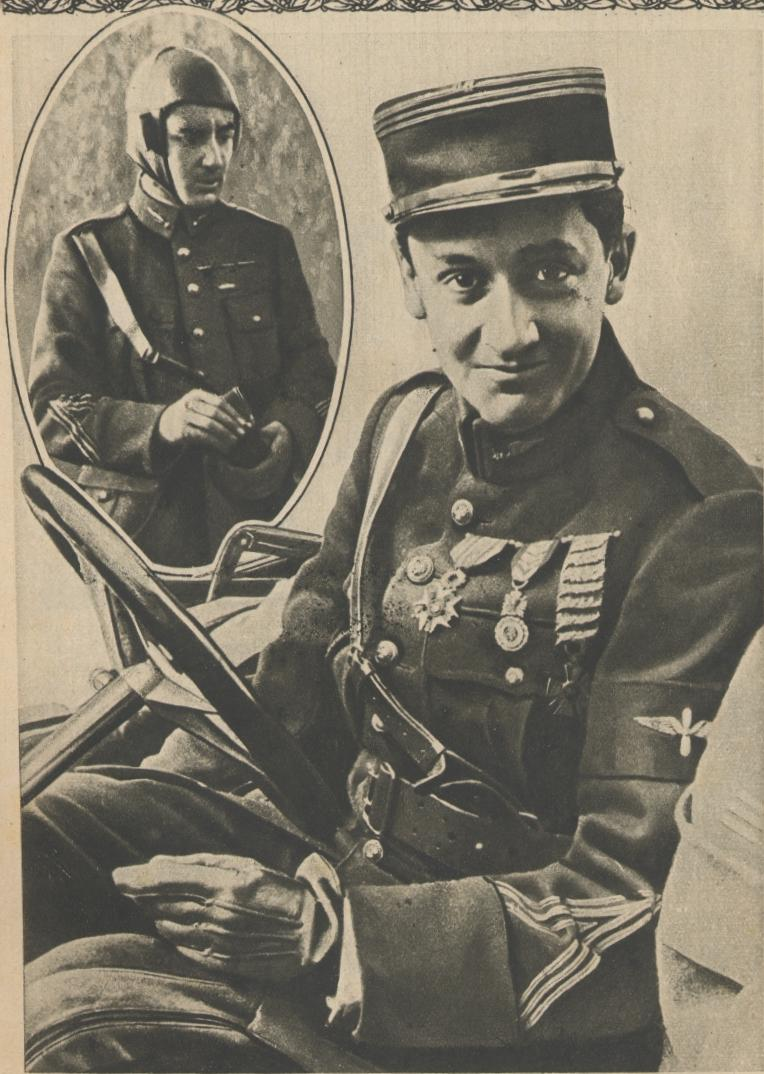
Fighter ace captain Georges Guynemer, a recipient of the 1914-18 Croix de guerre with 26 citations

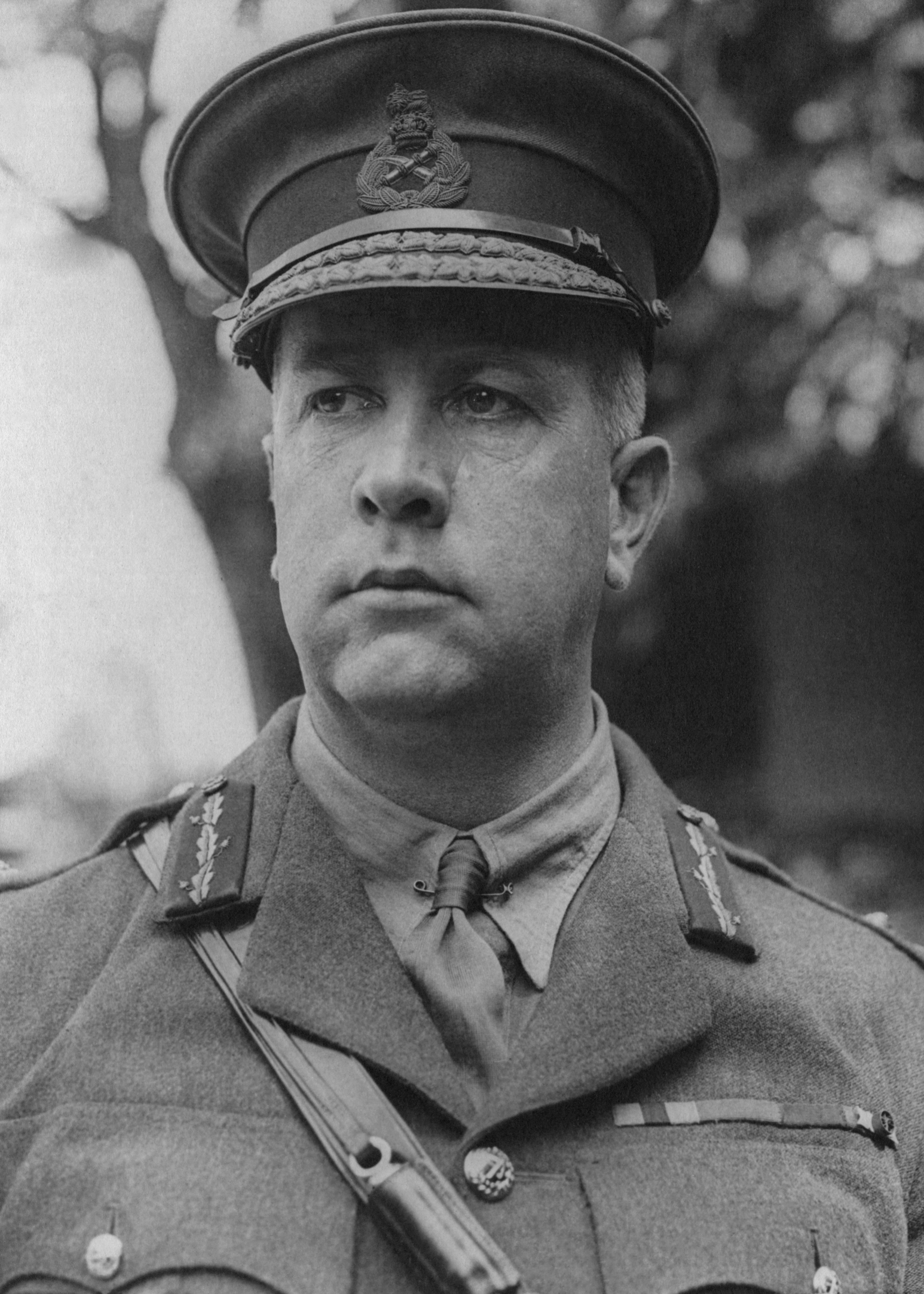
Canadian General Sir Arthur William Currie, a foreign recipient of the 1914-18 Croix de guerre with palm

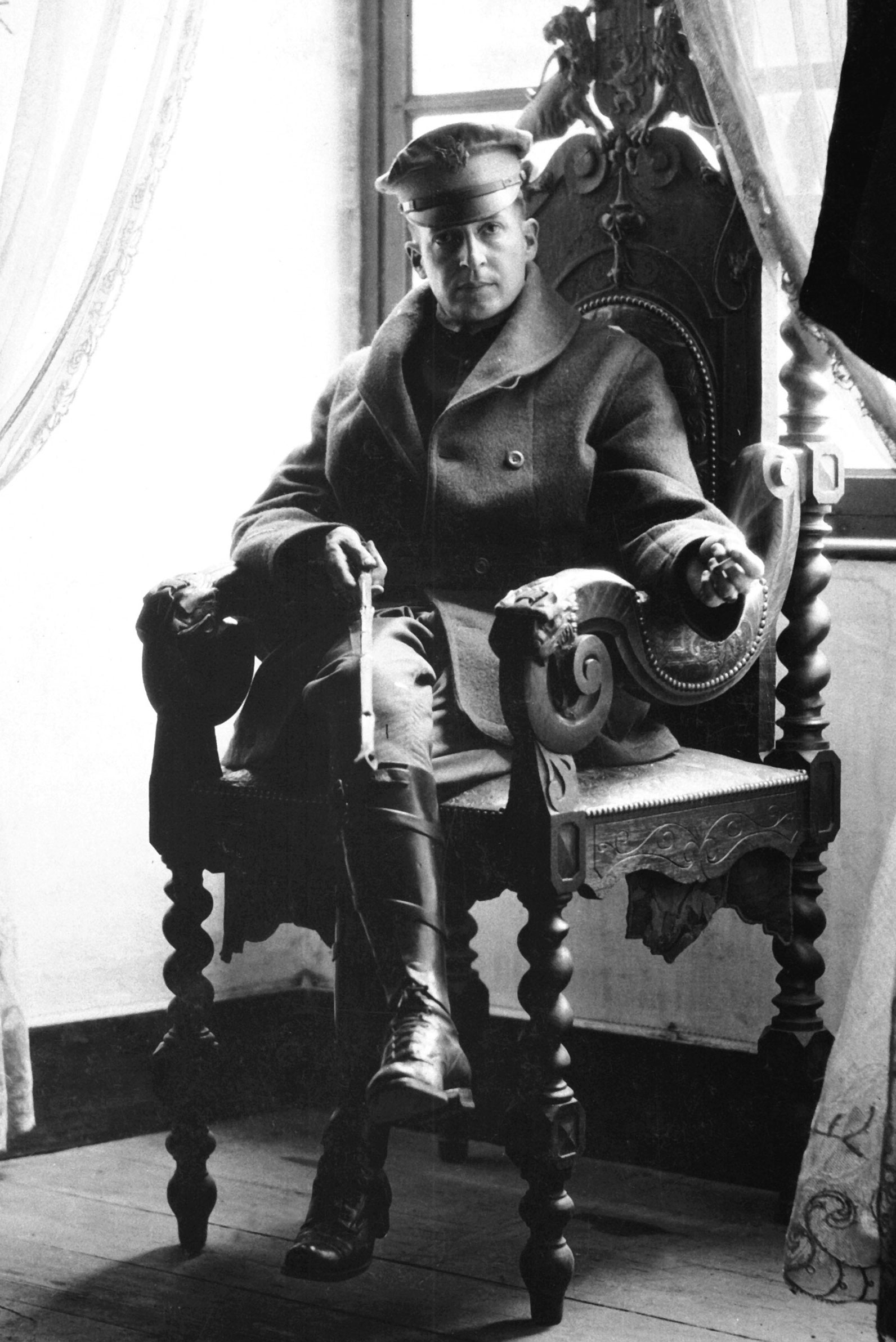
American General Douglas MacArthur, a foreign recipient of the 1914-18 Croix de guerre with palm and gilt star

- General Charles de Gaulle (1 citation)
- Fighter ace lieutenant Charles Nungesser (30 citations)
- Fighter ace captain Georges Guynemer (26 citations)
- General Edgard de Larminat (4 citations)
- General Joseph de Goislard de Monsabert (7 citations)
- Colonel Théophile Marie Brébant (4 citations)
- General Jean Vallette d'Osia (6 citations)
- General Raoul Salan (1 citation)
- Fighter ace colonel René Fonck (29 citations)
- General Marie-Pierre Kœnig (2 citations)
- General Raoul Magrin-Vernerey (11 citations)
- Fighter ace lieutenant-colonel Charles Nuville (10 citations)
- Fighter ace captain Georges Madon (10 citations)
- Marshal Joseph Joffre (1 citation)
- General Robert Nivelle (3 citations)
- Private Albert Severin Roche (12 citations)

== Notable foreign recipients (partial list) ==
- Colonel Araki Sadao Empire of Japan
- Brigadier General John William Barker United States
- Fighter ace Air Marshal William Avery "Billy" Bishop VC Canada
- Field Marshal Petar Bojović Kingdom of Serbia
- Lieutenant General Lewis H. Brereton United States
- Lieutenant Stanley Bruce Australia
- Major General Charles Budworth United Kingdom
- Corporal Eugene Bullard, French Air Force United States
- Fighter ace Captain Vernon Castle United Kingdom
- Carrier Pigeon Cher Ami, Lost Battalion (World War I) United States
- Fighter ace Air Vice Marshal Raymond Collishaw Canada
- General Sir Arthur William Currie Canada
- Fighter ace Major Roderic Dallas Australia
- Private Herman Davis United States
- Brigadier General Edward Terence Donnelly United States
- Brigadier General Lucius Loyd Durfee United States
- Field Marshal John French, 1st Earl of Ypres United Kingdom
- Private William Hicks United Kingdom
- Colonel Fukuda Hikosuke Empire of Japan
- Director General Stephen Galatti, American Field Service United States
- Lieutenant William F. Howe United States
- Brigadier General Evan M. Johnson United States
- Sergeant Henry Johnson United States
- Fighter ace Captain Robert A. Little Australia
- General Douglas MacArthur United States
- Lieutenant Giuseppe Franchi Maggi, Royal Italian Army Kingdom of Italy
- General George C. Marshall United States
- Fighter ace Major James McCudden United Kingdom
- Corporal Harry Miner VC Canada
- Field Marshal Živojin Mišić Kingdom of Serbia
- General John Monash Australia
- Lieutenant Colonel "Mad" Harry Murray Australia
- Air Chief Marshal Sir Keith Rodney Park New Zealand
- General Sir Archibald Paris United Kingdom
- General George S. Patton United States
- Captain Eddie Rickenbacker United States
- Private Needham Roberts United States
- Lieutenant Quentin Roosevelt United States
- Sergeant Milunka Savić Serbia
- Lieutenant Colonel Clarence O. Sherrill United States
- General Phraya Thephatsadin Siam
- Philanthropist Julia Hunt Catlin Park DePew Taufflieb United States
- Lieutenant Stephen W. Thompson, Lafayette Escadrille United States
- Sergeant Alvin C. York United States
- Lieutenant Colonel John Creagh Scott United Kingdom

== French recipient units (partial list) ==
- 1st Infantry Regiment
- 54th Infantry Regiment
- 126th Infantry Regiment
- 2nd Battalions of Light Infantry of Africa
- 1st Cuirassier Regiment
- 12th Cuirassier Regiment
- 6th Dragoon Regiment
- 9th Hussar Regiment
- 1st Artillery Regiment
- 2nd Dragoon Regiment
- 1st Moroccan Division
- French battleship Bouvet
- French battleship Gaulois
- French submarine Bernouilli
- Lafayette Escadrille France United States

== Allied recipient units (partial list) ==
- Portuguese Expeditionary Corps 15th Infantry Battalion Portugal
- Russian Expeditionary Force Russian Legion Battalion Russia
- The Black Watch United Kingdom
- Devonshire Regiment United Kingdom
- 5th Battery R.F.A. United Kingdom
- 2nd Motorized Field Ambulance United Kingdom
- 24th Field Ambulance United Kingdom
- 5th Field Artillery Regiment United States
- 7th Field Artillery Regiment United States
- 2nd Infantry Division United States
  - 15th Field Artillery Regiment United States
- 3rd Infantry Division United States
- 4th Infantry Division United States
- 16th Infantry Division United States
- 26th Infantry Division United States
- 32nd Infantry Division United States

- 119th Field Artillery Regiment United States

- 93rd Infantry Division United States
- 16th Infantry Regiment United States
- 18th Infantry Regiment United States
- 26th Infantry Regiment United States
- 39th Infantry Regiment United States
- 39th Infantry Division United States
- 104th Infantry Regiment United States
- 369th Infantry Regiment United States
- 370th Infantry Regiment United States
- 1st Engineer Battalion United States
- 5th Marine Regiment United States
- 6th Marine Regiment United States

== Recipient cities (partial list) ==
- Reims
- Paris
- Dinant Belgium
- Montdidier
- Calais
- Épernay
- Lille
- Nancy
- Amiens

== See also ==
- Ribbons of the French military and civil awards
- Croix de guerre 1939–1945
- Croix de guerre des théâtres d'opérations extérieures
- Croix de Guerre (Belgium)
