= National Medal of Recognition for victims of terrorism =

National medal of France

National Recognition Medal for Victims of Terrorism Médaille nationale de reconnaissance aux victimes du terrorisme
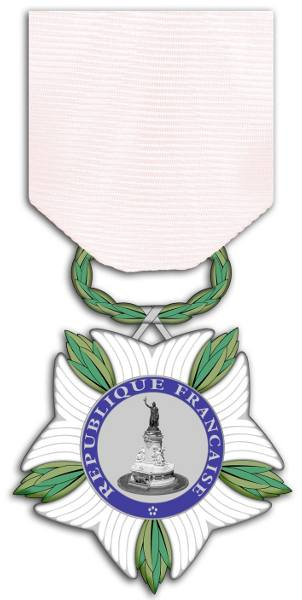
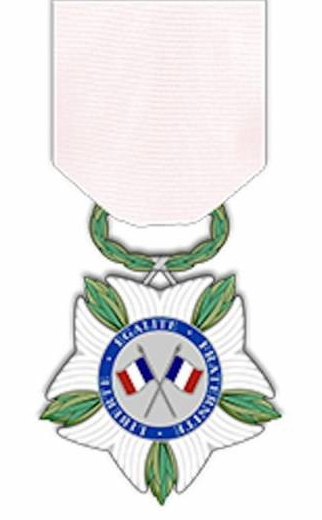
- Obverse (left) and reverse of the medal
- Type: Medal
- Awarded for: the recognition of people who have been killed, wounded, or held hostage during terrorist attacks.
- Presented by: France
- Eligibility: Victims of terrorism since 1 January 2006
- Established: 12 July 2016
- Ribbon bar of the medal

Precedence
- Next (higher): Ordre National du Mérite
- Next (lower): Croix de guerre 1939–1945; Croix de guerre TOE

The National Recognition Medal for Victims of Terrorism (French: Médaille nationale de reconnaissance aux victimes du terrorisme) is a national medal of France awarded to French victims of terrorism. Established by presidential decree on 12 July 2016, it may be awarded to French or foreign nationals who are victims of terrorism in France or abroad. The medal may be awarded to a retroactive date of 1 January 2006. The medal was created to give a proper recognition to the sacrifice of terrorism victims while still maintaining the award criterion of existing national honours such as the Legion of Honor. In Spain there is a similar honour known as the Royal Order of Civil Recognition for Victims of Terrorism.

== See also ==
- Medal for the Military Protection of the Territory: French military award related to combatting terrorism
