= Medal for the Military Protection of the Territory =

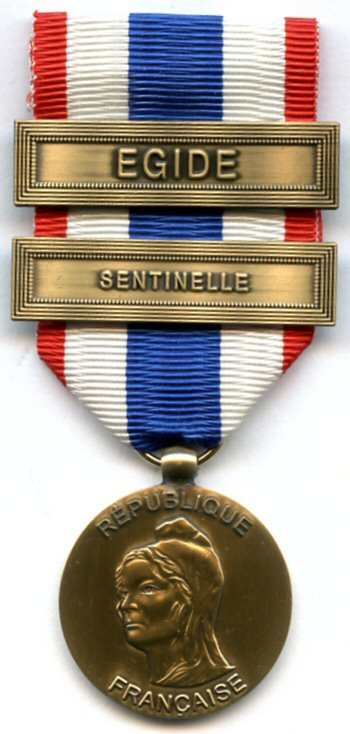
- Obverse of the medal with clasps EGIDE and SENTINELLE
- Type: Military Award
- Awarded for: Internal security operations
- Presented by: France
- Status: Currently Awarded
- Established: 13 July 2015
- Ribbon of the Medal for the Military Protection of the Territory

Precedence
- Next (higher): French commemorative medal

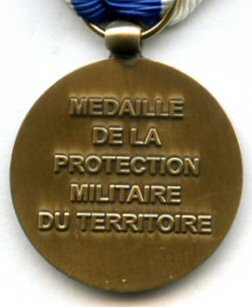
Reverse of the Medal for the Military Protection of the Territory

The Medal for the Military Protection of the Territory (French: "Médaille de la protection militaire du territoire") is a French state decoration established on 13 July 2015 by presidential decree 2015-853 and awarded to military personnel of the French Armed Forces for service during national security operations on French national territory. It was created to recognize service following the need for an increased military presence during national security operations following the rise of international terrorism and the many incidents in France over the past years.

== Award statute ==
The Medal for the Military Protection of the Territory is awarded to military personnel for their effective participation in military security operations as decided by the Government and carried out on the national territory. The Minister of Defense is responsible for the administration of the medal and will determine by decree:

- the operations giving the right to the award of the medal and its related clasp;
- the dates during the same operations that give the right to the award of the medal and its related clasp;
- the minimum number of days served during the same operations giving the right to the award of the medal and its related clasp.

In exceptional circumstances, the Minister of Defense may, without any condition of duration of service, award the medal and its related clasp to soldiers killed or wounded during one of these operations, or cited for exceptional merit in conjunction with the award of the gold grade of the National Defence Medal earned for service related to one of these operations.

== Clasps ==
The medal is always awarded with a clasp and multiple clasps may be worn simultaneously. Five clasps are currently approved for wear on the ribbon of the Medal for the Military Protection of the Territory:

- CYBER for thirty months of service in units whose main mission is related to national cyber defence, namely anticipation, surveillance, detection and response to computer and information attacks in the field of defence, on national territory. It may also be awarded for sixty days of effective participation in the missions described above.
- SENTINELLE for participation in Opération Sentinelle for a minimum time period of sixty days total service (continuous or not) between 7 January 2015 and a date not yet specified.
- HARPIE for effective participation in the "Harpie" mission for a minimum time period of thirty days total service (continuous or not) on the territory of the department and overseas region of French Guiana between 1 March 2008 and a date not yet specified.
- TRIDENT for effective participation in military surveillance and protection missions of French airspace, waters and land areas between 1 July 2013 and a date not yet specified. The time requirement for award of this clasp is 30 months total service for members of units whose primary mission was and remains the same as the award prerequisites, to military personnel not part of such units for 60 days total service (continuous or not) or if in the case of surveillance flights, twenty such flights.
- JUPITER for effective participation in military surveillance and protection missions by strategic forces between 1 July 2013 and a date not yet specified. The time requirement for award of this clasp is 30 months total service for members of units whose primary mission was and remains the same as the award prerequisites, to military personnel not part of such units for 60 days total service (continuous or not) or if in the case of surveillance flights, twenty such flights.
- ÉGIDE for effective participation in the military protection of military assets, public and state buildings, of international organisations and diplomatic and consular missions between 1 July 2013 and a date not yet specified. The time requirement for award of this clasp is 30 months total service for members of units whose primary mission was and remains the same as the award prerequisites, to military personnel not part of such units for 60 days total service (continuous or not) or if in the case of surveillance flights, twenty such flights.

== Award description ==
The Medal for the Military Protection of the Territory is a 30 mm in diameter circular medal struck from bronze. Its obverse bears the effigy of the Republic with the relief inscription above "RÉPUBLIQUE" and below "FRANÇAISE" (English: "FRENCH REPUBLIC"). The reverse bears the relief inscription on five lines "MÉDAILLE" "DE LA" "PROTECTION MILITAIRE" "DU" "TERRITOIRE" (English: "MEDAL" "FOR THE" "MILITARY PROTECTION" "OF THE" "TERRITORY").

The medal hangs from a 38 mm wide silk moiré ribbon passing through a ring through the medal's ball shaped suspension loop. The ribbon bears the national colours of France in the following pattern: 14 mm wide blue vertical central stripe bordered by white 8 mm wide stripes with 5 mm wide red edge stripes.

== See also ==
- National Medal of Recognition for victims of terrorism
- Charlie Hebdo shooting
- November 2015 Paris attacks
- 2016 Nice truck attack
- List of terrorist incidents in France
