= Garcin =

Garcin may refer to:

People with the surname

- Éric Garcin (born 1965), French football player and coach
- Estève Garcin (1784–1859), Occitan language writer
- Federico Garcín (born 1973), Uruguayan basketball player
- Gilles Garcin (1647–1702), French painter
- Ginette Garcin (1928–2010), French actress
- Henri Garcin (1928–2022), Belgian actor
- Jérôme Garcin (born 1956), French journalist and writer
- Joseph Héliodore Garcin de Tassy (1794–1878), French orientalist
- Jules Garcin (1830–1896), French violinist, conductor and composer

Places

- Garčin, Brod-Posavina County, Croatia
- Gârcin River, Romania
