= Fairy stone =

Fairy stone may refer to:

- The mineral staurolite
- Certain calcium carbonate concretions in clay
- Fairy Stone State Park in Patrick County, Virginia
- Dolmen of the Fairy Stone, Draguignan, France
