= Hôtel de Ville, Draguignan =

Town hall in Draguignan, France

Hôtel de Ville
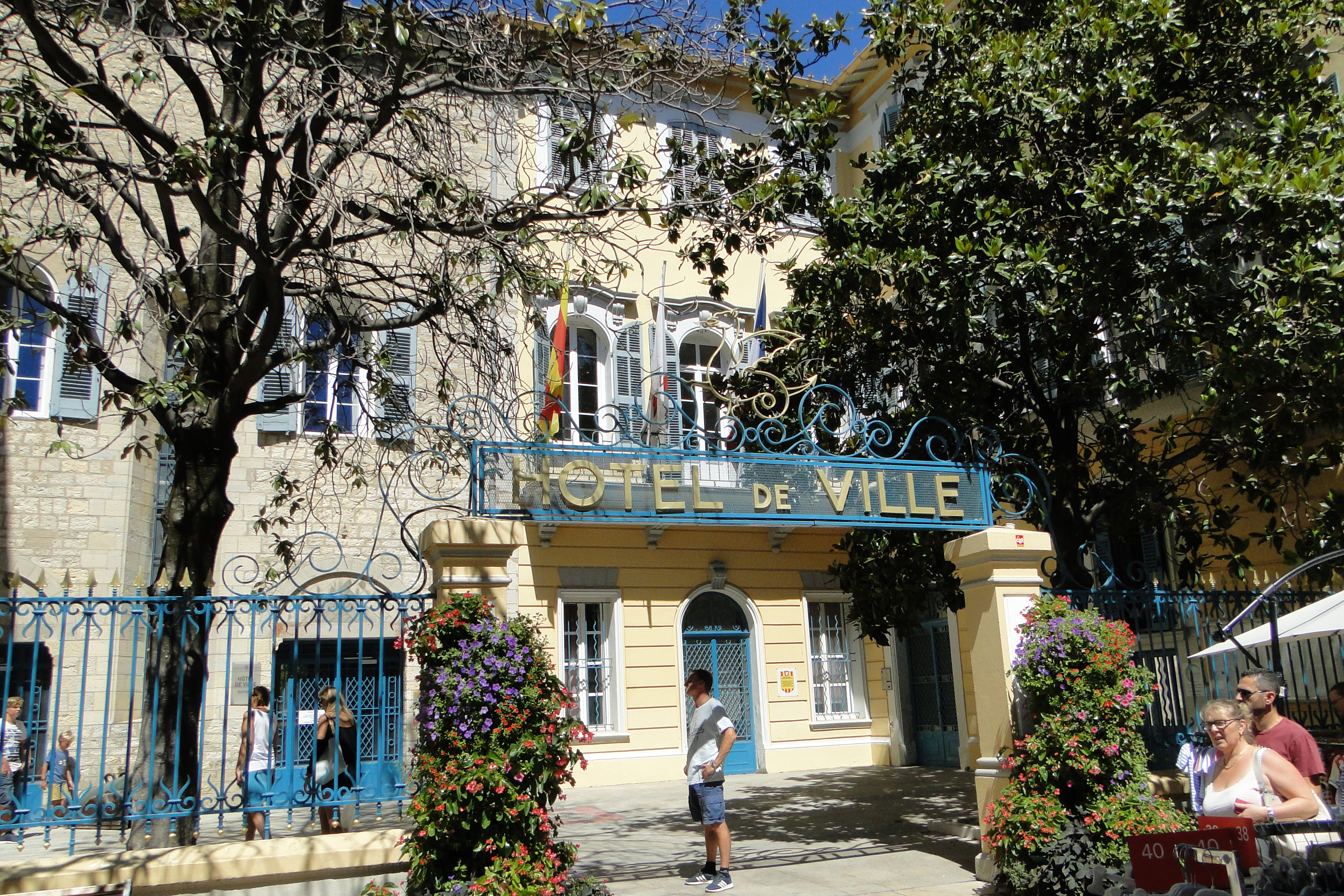
- The main frontage of the Hôtel de Ville in August 2017
- Interactive map of the Hôtel de Ville area

General information
- Type: City hall
- Architectural style: Neoclassical style
- Location: Draguignan, France
- Coordinates: 43.5382°N 6.4634°E
- Completed: c.1791

The Hôtel de Ville (French pronunciation: [otɛl də vil], City Hall) is a municipal building in Draguignan, Var, in southeastern France, standing on Rue Georges Cisson.

== History ==
The Hôtel de Ville is situated within the grounds of the Couvent des Cordeliers (Convent of the Cordeliers) which dates from 1265. The convent was built on a route known in the Middle Ages as the Iter Regius (Royal Journey), linking the Rhône Vally to northern Italy, and was managed by the Franciscans. Notable visitors included Saint Louis in 1295 and Antipope Benedict XIII in 1404. The design involved a single nave with a ribbed vault and an apse.

After the convent was confiscated by the state as biens nationaux (for the good of the state), the friars were driven out and it was acquired by the town council in 1791. The council also acquired an adjacent hôtel particulier, Hôtel Thomé de la Plane. This enabled the council to consolidate the site with a series of buildings placed around a courtyard. At the back of the courtyard, the old convent building was to the left and a new municipal building to the right. The new municipal building had a main frontage of just three bays. The central bay featured a round headed doorway with a keystone, which was flanked by a pair of casement windows. The building was fenestrated by three round headed windows with curved cornices and shutters on the first floor and by three segmental headed windows with shutters on the second floor. Meanwhile, the original convent building was converted to create a Salle des Mariages (wedding room).

After the Second World War, the road in front of the town hall, Rue Nationale, was renamed Rue Georges Cisson to commemorate the life of the former local commander of the French Resistance who was arrested by the Gestapo and executed at Signes on 18 July 1944. This was less than a month before the liberation of Draguignan by American troops during Operation Dragoon on 16 August 1944.

A large mural, painted by Vincent Fichaux and Michel Crosa, which depicted the legend of Saint-Hermentaire slaying a dragon in the 5th century, was unveiled in the original convent building in May 2013.
