= Église Saint-Jean-de-Malte =

Coordinates: 43°31′32″N 5°27′10″E

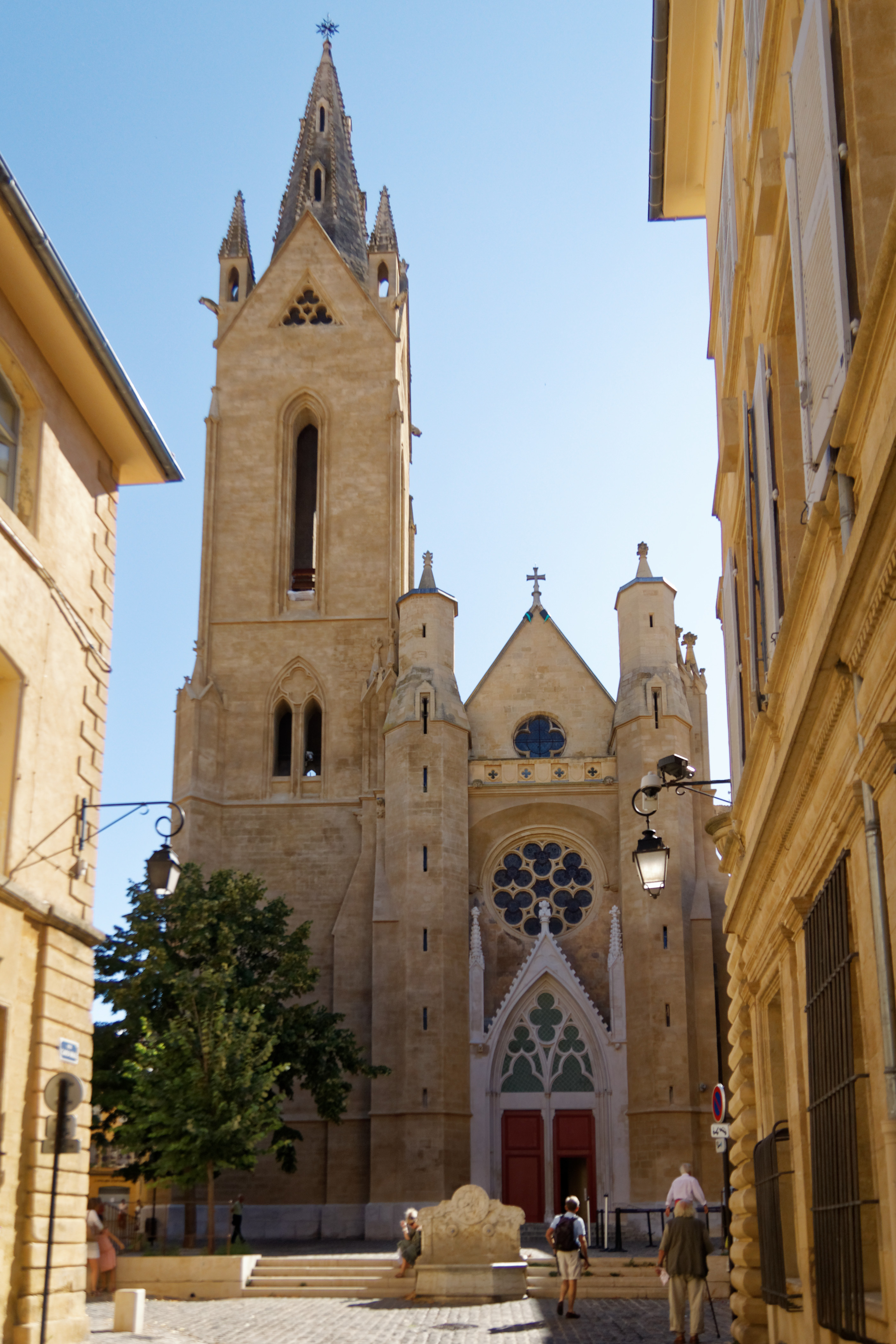
- Église Saint-Jean-de-Malte
- Location: Aix-en-Provence
- Country: France
- Denomination: Roman Catholic

Architecture
- Architectural type: Gothic architecture

Administration
- Diocese: Archdiocese of Aix-en-Provence

The Church of St. John in Aix-en-Provence, situated at the corner of rue d'Italie and rue Cardinale, is a Gothic Roman Catholic church, the first in Provence. It was built in the 13th century, mostly in the 1270s.

== History ==
The site was initially occupied in the twelfth century by a hospice and chapel of the Knights Hospitaller of the Order of Malta, under the jurisdiction of the priory of Saint-Gilles in Provence. The thirteenth-century church formed part of a priory of the same order situated in olive groves outside the city walls of Aix. From the thirteenth century it served as a burial place for the Counts of Provence.

In the 17th century the parish was incorporated within the city of Aix when the ramparts were extended to the south and the adjoining lands of the priory sold off to help create the quartier Mazarin. In the aftermath of the French Revolution most of the internal furnishings, treasures and statuary of the church were removed or plundered and the church itself converted into a military storehouse. In the 19th century it was eventually restored to religious use as a parish church.

The church is currently under the ministry of a brotherhood of apostolic monks. The nineteenth century organ in Saint-Jean-de-Malte was replaced in 2006 by a baroque-style organ built by Daniel Kern. The interior of the church may be seen in Michelangelo Antonioni's 1995 film Beyond the Clouds.

== Windows and stained glass ==
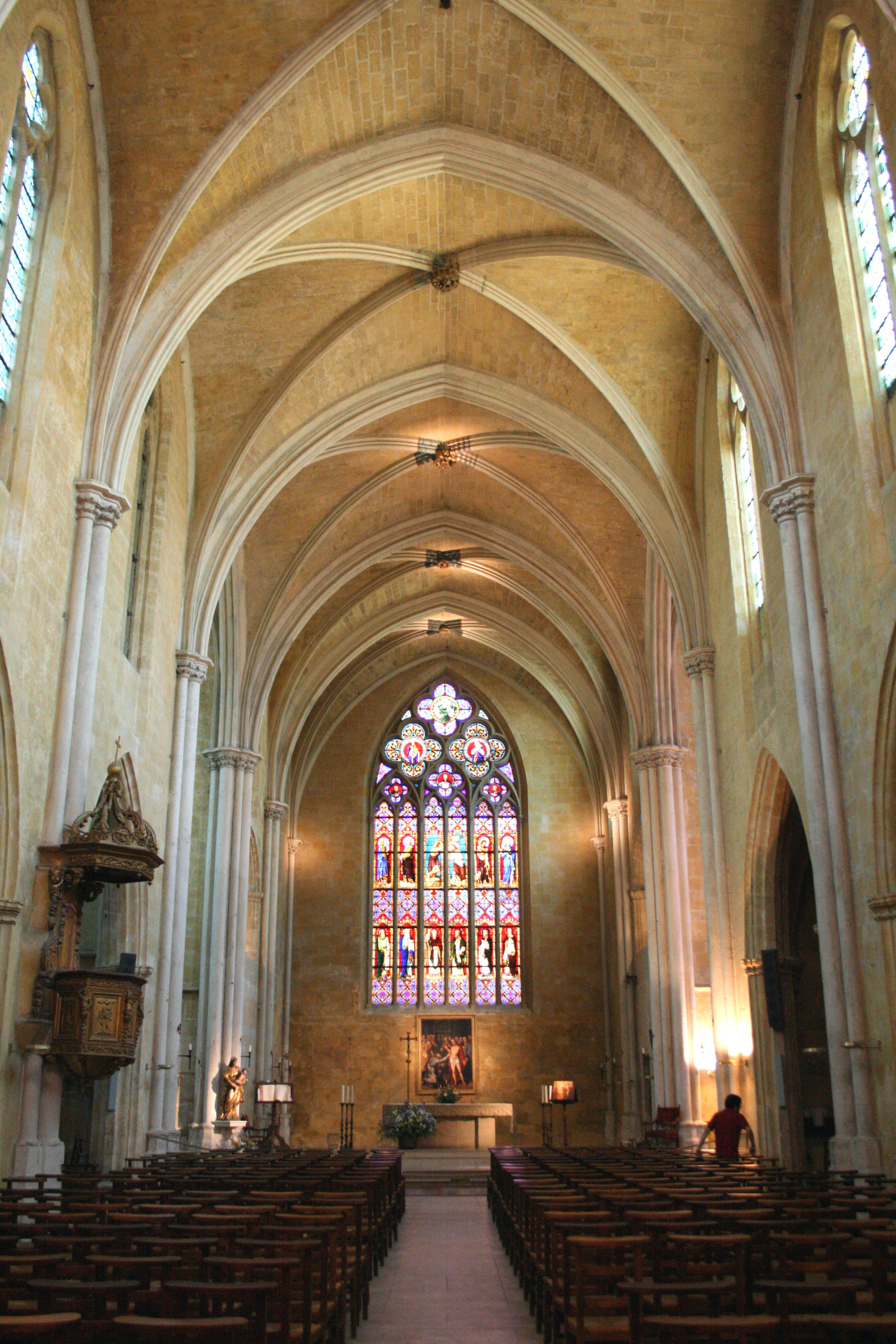
Interior of Saint-Jean-de-Malte

The reopening in 1858 of the large window in the apse, blocked by Jean-Claude Viany for the installation of a large altarpiece in the seventeenth century, revealed traces of polychrome stained glass indicating that in the seventeenth century the church not only had monochrome grisailles but also coloured windows, with at least some of them depicting Saint-Jean-de-Malte himself. The windows in the church today date from the nineteenth and twentieth centuries.

The new window in the apse was completed in 1858 and was designed by several artists from Aix. In the upper quatrefoils are God the Father, crowned with a globe in his left hand as he delivers a blessing with his right hand. He is flanked by Ramon Berenguer IV, Count of Provence and Beatrice of Provence. In three smaller quatrefoils below are three knights hospitaller of Malta: Berenger Monachi (l.), Gerard Thom (c., founder of the order) and Hélion de Villeneuve (r.). The three pairs of windows below represent scenes from the life of John the Baptist: his meeting with the Virgin Mary; the baptism of Christ; and with Christ in a diptych. In the six panels below are Old Testament figures (from l. to r.): Abraham, Moses, Isaiah, Jeremiah, Ezekiel and Daniel. At the base of the window are six thirteenth century coats of arms connected with the Order, including those of Provence, Malta, Aragon and Aix.

Other notable windows include the large rose window above the entrance to the church installed in 1896: the original rose window was blocked by Viany in the seventeenth century to make room for an organ. In 1984 an abstract window by Henri Guérin was installed in the southern transept. Its coloured blocks were designed to take advantage of the changing quality of sunlight at different times of day and liturgical season.

== Paintings ==
Although in the seventeenth century the prior Jean-Claude Viany commissioned paintings from Gilles Garcin and sculpture from Christophe Veyrier and his nephew Thomas, some of which can be still be seen in the church, the lack of funds when the parish was re-established after the French revolution limited the further acquisition of paintings. A number of paintings, however, have come from disestablished churches or have been donated privately, including most recently the Crucifixion by Delacroix.

- St Henry pleading with the Virgin for the souls in purgatory (1687), Jean Armelin

Commissioned for the Chapel of the Souls in Purgatory in Saint-Jean-de-Malte, it was the gift of Henry de Simiane de Lacoste, a knight of Malta, who is depicted as the donor.

- The Annunciation and Death of the Virgin (1678), André Boisson

These are two of a series of six paintings of scenes from the life of the Virgin, commissioned for the chapel of the former Palace of the Counts of Provence. Two other paintings from the series can be seen at the Church of the Madeleine in the place des Prēcheurs.

- Theology (1744-1749), Michel-François Dandré-Bardon

This painting was part of a series of allegorical wall panels originally in the historic buildings of the University of Aix, opposite Aix Cathedral.

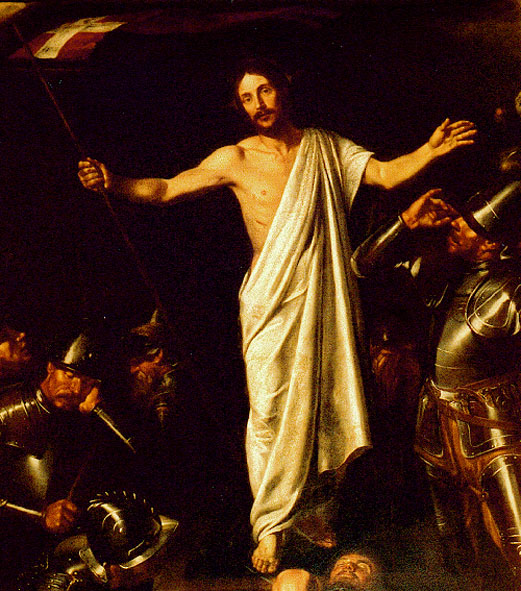
Louis Finson (1610): The Resurrection

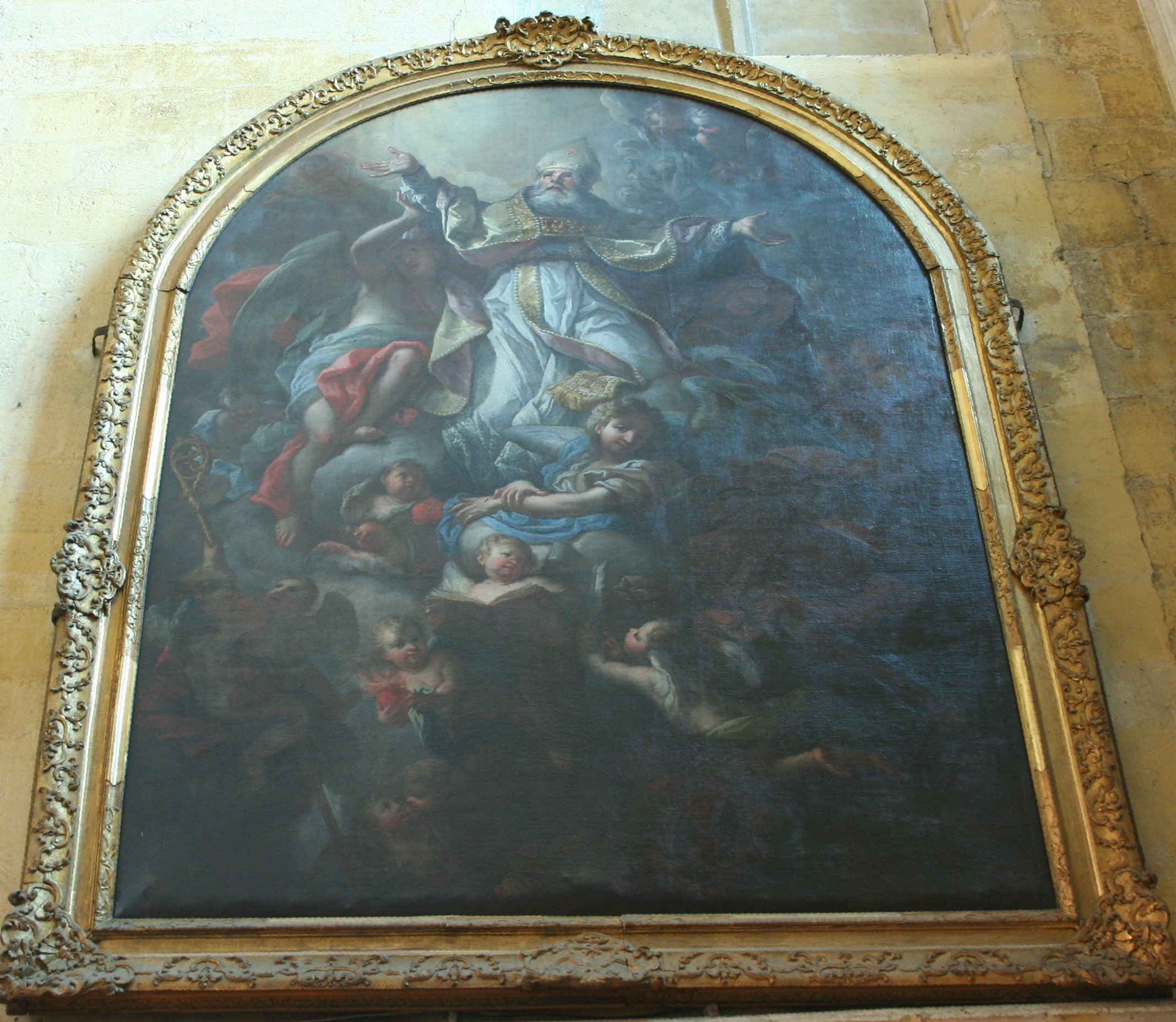
Michel Serre: Apotheosis of St Augustine

- The Resurrection of Christ (1610), Louis Finson

This painting by the Flemish painter Finson, a follower of Caravaggio who lived in Aix between 1610 and 1616, was originally in the Chapel of Jesuits in Aix prior to the revolution.

- Christ appearing to Mary Magdalen in the garden, The Miracle of St Blaise and Our Lady of peaceful rest (1690), Gilles Garcin

These three paintings, the first of which was damaged and only partially restored, were commissioned by Viany for altarpieces in the side-chapels of Saint-Jean-de-Malte.

- The Descent from the Cross (1612), André Gaudion

Gaudion was born in Lyon, but settled in Marseille. He was active in Aix between 1612 and 1634. This painting was probably originally in a Franciscan chapel in Aix.

- St Bruno at the feet of the Virgin (1663), Reynaud Levieux

Levieux was born in Nimes; he worked in Aix between 1663 and 1670. This painting, sometimes considered his best work, was part of the main altarpiece of a Carthusian chapel in Aix before the revolution.

- The Descent from the Cross (1611), Martin Guillaume

A copy of a well-known Descent by Federico Barocci, this painting was originally in the chapel of the Black Friars (Pénitents Noirs) in Aix. It was purchased for the church in 1771 by Joseph-Félix Alphéran, who subsequently became prior of Saint-Jean-de-Malte.

- Our Lady of Mount Carmel, Nicolas Mignard (1606-1668)

This painting by the Avignon-based artist Nicolas Mignard, elder brother of the court portraitist Pierre Mignard, was originally in the Carmelite chapel of the fourteenth century Église des Grandes-Carmes, formerly one of the main churches in Aix and burial place of René of Anjou's entrails. Following the destruction of the Grandes-Carmes during the revolution, the painting was moved to the Church of Saint-Esprit on rue Espariat and then to Saint-Jean-de-Malte.

- Christ on the Cross with the Virgin and St John, The Judgement of Solomon and The woman taken in adultery (1673), Nicolas Pinson

These three paintings come from the main parliamentary chamber in the former Palace of the Counts of Provence.

- The Apotheosis of St Augustin, Michel Serre (1658-1733)

Born in Catalonia, Serre lived in Marseille from the age of 17. He became a prolific painter as well as a designer for the royal fleet. During the plague of 1720, he showed great devotion to those afflicted and distributed his fortune to the poor, later to die a pauper himself. This painting was originally in the Augustinian chapel off rue Espariat.

- The risen Christ appearing to St Thomas (1614), Jacques Macadré

This painting was originally commissioned for the Église des Grandes-Carmes by Alexandre de Michaelis, a squire in Aix.

- St Roch, St Antony and St Sebastian, anonymous

This fourteenth century Florentine triptych is a recent acquisition.

- The Apotheosis of St John of God, Jean-Baptiste Jouvenet

This early eighteenth-century painting of the Portuguese saint was recently restored by the art historian Marie-Christine Gloton.

- The Crucifixion (1820), Eugène Delacroix, donated in 1998

This early painting by Delacroix is based on a Crucifixion by Anthony van Dyck.
