= Michel Lafourcade =

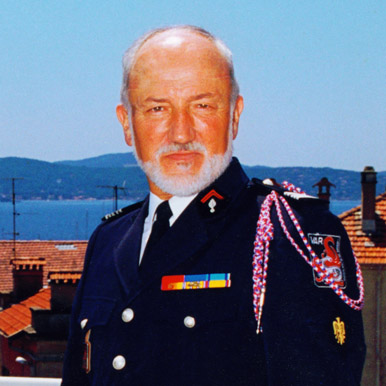
Colonel Michel Lafourcade in May 1995

Michel Lafourcade (19 April 1941 – 4 October 2006) was a colonel of French firefighters, director of regional fire and emergency headquarters.

== Biography ==
Colonel Michel Lafourcade was born in Bélus, the son of Maurice Lafourcade, postmaster, and Marie Galharret, housewife. He was married to Jacqueline Chardac, social worker, with whom he had two children, Jérôme and Aurélie. Educated at the high school Pierre Loti of Rochefort, then graduated from the school of meteorology of Saint-Cyr-l'École. He began his career with the National Weather, in Beauvais from 1964 to 1966, then in French Guiana in Cayenne from 1966 to 1967.

In 1967, after having passed the examination ad hoc, he was appointed inspector of the French Guiana fire and emergency headquarters, with the rank of major. He is then, at age 26, the youngest regional director of France.

Back in Metropolitan France, he was appointed inspector of the Cantal headquarters in January 1974. Inspector of the Meurthe-et-Moselle headquarters starting February 1978, he got in that department the rank of lieutenant colonel. He has taken the title of regional director of the fire and emergency headquarters in January 1981, developed the mobile rescue units and the first advanced medical post of French firefighters.

In January 1988, he was promoted colonel and was appointed regional director of the fire and emergency headquarters of Var in Draguignan.

He played role in the implementation of the departmentalization of the fire and emergency services. This reform of the organization of the firefighter profession has been implemented smoothly, without conflicts, because of colonel Michel Lafourcade’s consultation and dialogue skills. He retired in 2002.

In addition to being a great firefighter, especially as representative of the regional directors from the sud-mediterranee zone, he has been an emeritus citizen of Draguignan. Involved in the community life, particularly within the Rotary International where he created and chaired the Rotary Club Templiers, he took part in many humanitarian and charitable activities. He died in Draguignan.

== Decorations and awards ==
Officer of the Legion of Honour and Officer of the Ordre national du Mérite, holder of the Youth and Sports Medal and the Firefighters Medal of Honour, colonel Michel Lafourcade has received various awards including those of the National Federation of Firefighters of France, the Federations of Firefighters of Germany and of Luxembourg.

== Honors ==
A boulevard of Draguignan is named after him; the former boulevard Maljournal bordering the fire and emergency headquarters of Var has been renamed boulevard colonel Michel Lafourcade on 1 December 2006.

== Bibliography ==
- Alain Larcan et Marie-Claude Laprévote-Heully, Urgences médicales, Éditions Masson, 1982.
- Alain Larcan, Quarante ans de réanimation et de médecine d'urgence, Annales médicales de médecine, Université de Nancy I, 1998.
- Hommage au colonel Michel Lafourcade, Salamandre 83, Le journal d'information des sapeurs-pompiers du Var n° 7, 2007.
- Pierre Schaller, Ma saison en enfer, Éditions Flammarion, 2008.
- José Rubio Arvelo et Michaël Crosa, Draguignan et ses rues : Les illustres illustrés, Éditions Livres de Provence, 2011.
