= Honour medal for firefighters =

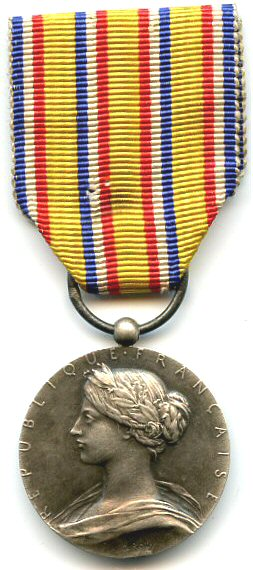
- Honour medal for firefighters, 1900–1935 variant (obverse)
- Type: Decoration
- Awarded for: Long service, exceptional services with rosette
- Country: France
- Presented by: the Minister of the Interior
- Eligibility: French firefighters
- Status: Currently awarded
- Established: 16 February 1900
- Ribbon for exceptional services Ribbon for long service

Precedence
- Next (higher): Medal for voluntary military service
- Next (lower): Medal of the Nation's Gratitude

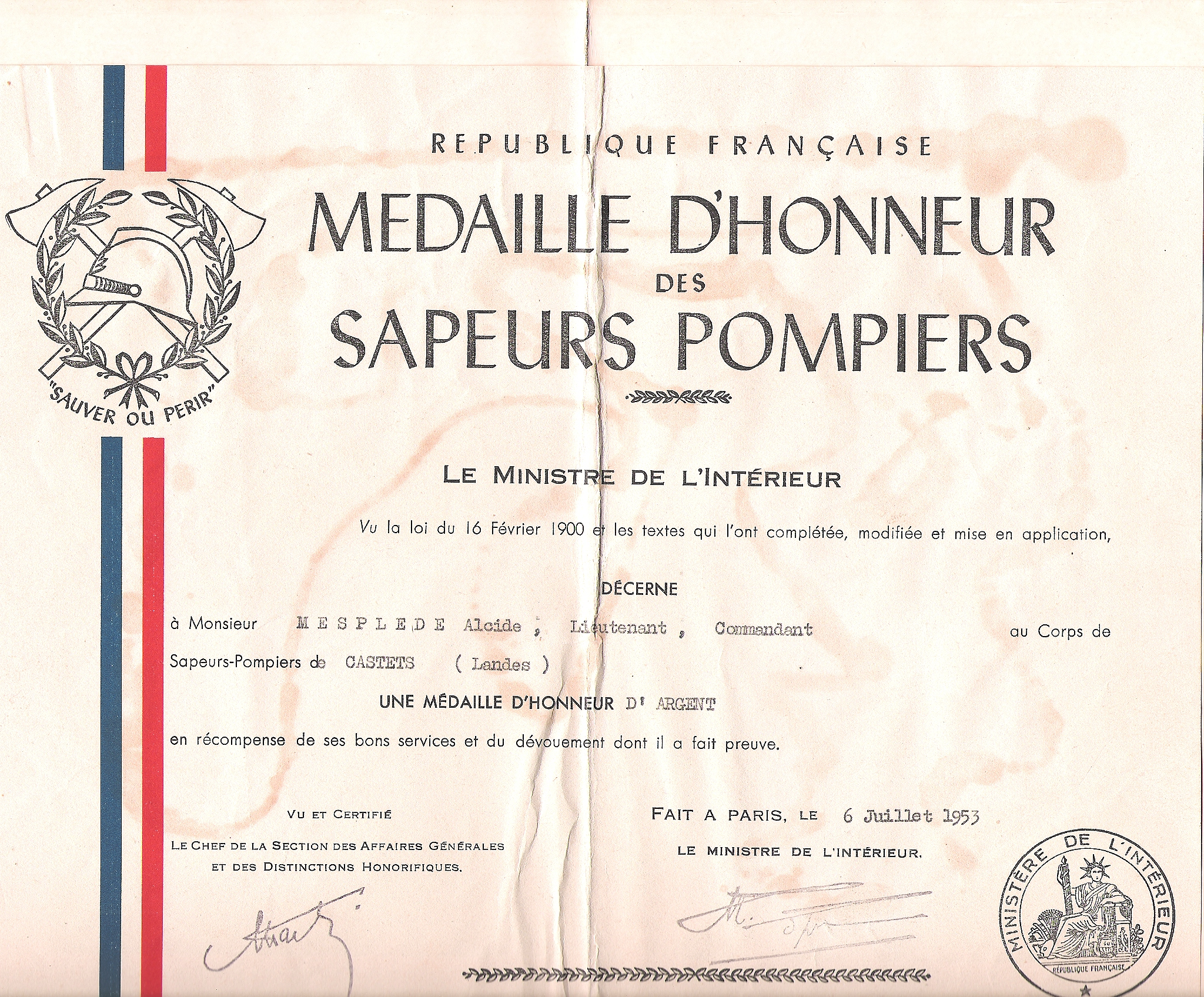
1953 silver medal award certificate for lieutenant Alcide Mespléde

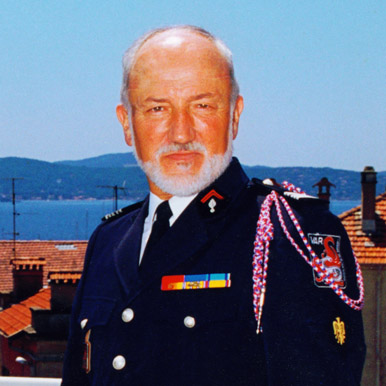
Colonel Michel Lafourcade, a recipient of the Honour medal for firefighters

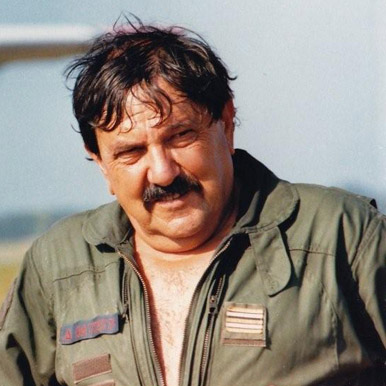
Colonel Antoine Battesti, a recipient of the Honour medal for firefighters

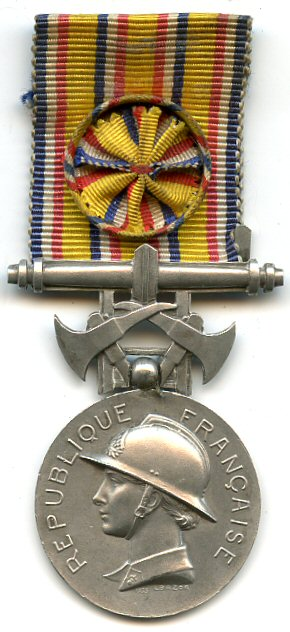
Honour medal for firefighters for exceptional services in silver, 1935–1981 variant (obverse)

The Honour medal for firefighters (French: "Médaille d'honneur des Sapeurs Pompiers") is a state decoration of France bestowed by the Ministry of the Interior to members of the French Fire Service.

Although possessing a two-century-old firefighting tradition, the French government proved slow in recognizing the service and courage of the men and women who face risk on a daily basis to save lives and property. Not until 1875 was a service certificate established and bestowed for thirty years of service. This was the only means of recognizing the devotion to duty of Parisian and rural firemen until the establishment of the Honour medal for firefighters by a law of 16 February 1900. Another twenty two years would elapse until a decree of 14 March 1922 added a rosette to the ribbon of the medal to denote an act of bravery. A later law of 12 December 1934 added silver-gilt and gold grades to the medal for long service. A silver-gilt grade of the medal for exceptional service only came to be in 1962.

The decree of 4 March 1981 saw a new design and ribbon for the Honour medal for firefighters awarded for exceptional service.

== Award statute ==
The Honour medal for firefighters is bestowed to firefighters:

- who have always displayed devotion to duty (long service); or,
- who have particularly distinguished themselves (exceptional service).

In the case of an award for long service:

- the silver grade is awarded for 20 years of service;
- the silver-gilt grade is awarded for 25 years of service;
- the gold grade is awarded for 35 years of service for professional firefighters or 30 years of service for volunteer firemen.

When calculating seniority, military service is counted to the limit of mandatory service during peacetime and the total time served when in war time. Time spent in the military as part of a civil defence training unit counts toward award of the medal for long service to volunteer firemen.

In the case of an award for exceptional service:

- the silver grade is awarded for exceptional service or an act of bravery;
- the silver-gilt grade is awarded for exceptional service or an act of bravery if already awarded the silver grade at least five years previously. In exceptional circumstances, it may also be awarded upon retirement after thirty years of service, if already awarded the silver medal.

Both grades bestowed for exceptional service may be awarded posthumously regardless of seniority if death occurred in the line of duty.

The Honour medal for firefighters, whether awarded for seniority or for bravery, is accompanied by an award certificate.

== Award description ==
The Honour medal for firefighters bestowed "for long service" is a 30mm in diameter (27mm before 1935) circular medal. Its obverse bears the effigy of the republic in the form of the relief image of the left profile of a woman wearing a firefighter's helmet, also visible is her uniform collar bearing the distinctive grenade insignia of the firefighting corps in France. On either side, the relief inscription along the circumference "RÉPUBLIQUE FRANÇAISE" (English: "FRENCH REPUBLIC"). The medal is struck in silver, silver-gilt and gold. The silver grade award's ribbon suspension bar is adorned with opposing fire hose nozzles. Each grade above silver is denoted by an increasingly intricate ornamentation on the ribbon suspension bar. For the silver-gilt variant, this consists of crossed firemen's axes superimposed over part of a ladder below horizontal fire hose nozzles. The gold variant replaces the nozzles with a laurel wreath.

The reverse of the medal bears at its center, the relief image of a fireman's helmet partially covering a building on fire above the inscription "HONNEUR AU DEVOUEMENT" (English: "HONOUR TO DEVOTION") itself above a blank area reserved for the recipient's name and year of award. The relief image of flames at the very bottom and on either side of the fire hall. At the top along the medal circumference, the relief semi circular inscription "MINISTÈRE DE L'INTÉRIEUR" (English: "INTERIOR MINISTRY").

The original pre 1981 silver and silver-gilt medals bestowed "for exceptional services" were of the same design as the silver grade "for long service" except for the addition of crossed firemen's axes superimposed over part of a ladder and a rosette on the ribbon, their reverse was identical.

All aforementioned awards hung from the same 28mm wide silk moiré yellow ribbon bearing four vertical 4 mm wide tricolour (blue-white-red in the right half and red-white-blue in the left half) stripes positioned on the ribbon edges and 4 mm apart at the center. The rosette was made of the same ribbon.

The current, post 1981 Honour medal for firefighters bestowed "for exceptional services" is a 32mm in diameter circular medal. Its obverse bears the relief image of the left profile of a helmeted male firefighter, above his head, the relief semi circular inscription "MINISTÈRE DE L'INTÉRIEUR" (English: "INTERIOR MINISTRY") along the medal's upper circumference. The ribbon suspension bar is adorned with two crossed firemen's axes resting atop two laurel branches from which flames shoot upwards to just above opposing horizontal fire hose nozzles. The medal is struck in silver or silver-gilt variants. The reverse bears a Phrygian cap with between two axes below the initials "R.F.".

The medal hangs from a 37mm wide silk moiré ribbon of red on the right edge watering into yellow across its width. The ribbon bears a rosette of the same colours to indicate that it is an award "for exceptional services".

== Notable recipients (partial list) ==
- Colonel Antoine Battesti
- Colonel Michel Lafourcade

== See also ==
- Paris Fire Brigade
- Marseille Naval Fire Battalion
- Fire service in France
- Sécurité Civile
