= Jean-Marie Auberson =

Swiss conductor and violinist (1920–2004)

Jean-Marie Auberson (May 2, 1920 – July 4, 2004) was a Swiss conductor and violinist.

== Early life and education ==
Auberson was born in Chavornay, Vaud; his father, François Auberson, was a farmer. He studied violin and viola at the Lausanne Conservatory, graduating in 1943 with a license to teach violin. He subsequently studied conducting with Günter Wand in Cologne in 1950–51 and from 1956 to 1960 under Ernest Ansermet and Carl Schuricht.

== Career ==
He was engaged as a violinist by the Orchestre de Chambre de Lausanne in 1943, and in 1946 moved to the Orchestre de la Suisse Romande as a violist.

He began his career as a conductor in 1951, as second conductor at the Orchestre de la Suisse Romande, where he remained until 1956. He then became conductor at Radio Beromünster (now Radio SRF 1 until 1962, and at the symphony orchestra of Saint-Gallen from 1962 to 1968. From 1968 to 1973, he was conductor for French repertoire and ballet at the Hamburg State Opera, and from 1972 to 1975 conductor of the Basel radio symphony orchestra. He also conducted many productions at the Grand Théâtre de Genève from 1966 onward. He conducted the premieres of a number of contemporary works, many broadcast by Radio Lausanne, and recorded with the Vienna State Opera chorus and orchestra and the Geneva Baroque Orchestra, among others.

== Personal life and death ==
With his wife Antoinette Moulin, a pianist, Auberson had daughter Audrey Michael, a soprano, and sons Pascal Auberson, a singer and percussionist, and Antoine Auberson, a jazz saxophonist and composer. He died in Draguignan, Var, France.
