= Dolmen of the Fairy Stone =

Prehistoric tomb in south-eastern France

- Dolmen Pierre de la Fée (French); Peiro de la Fado (Occitan)
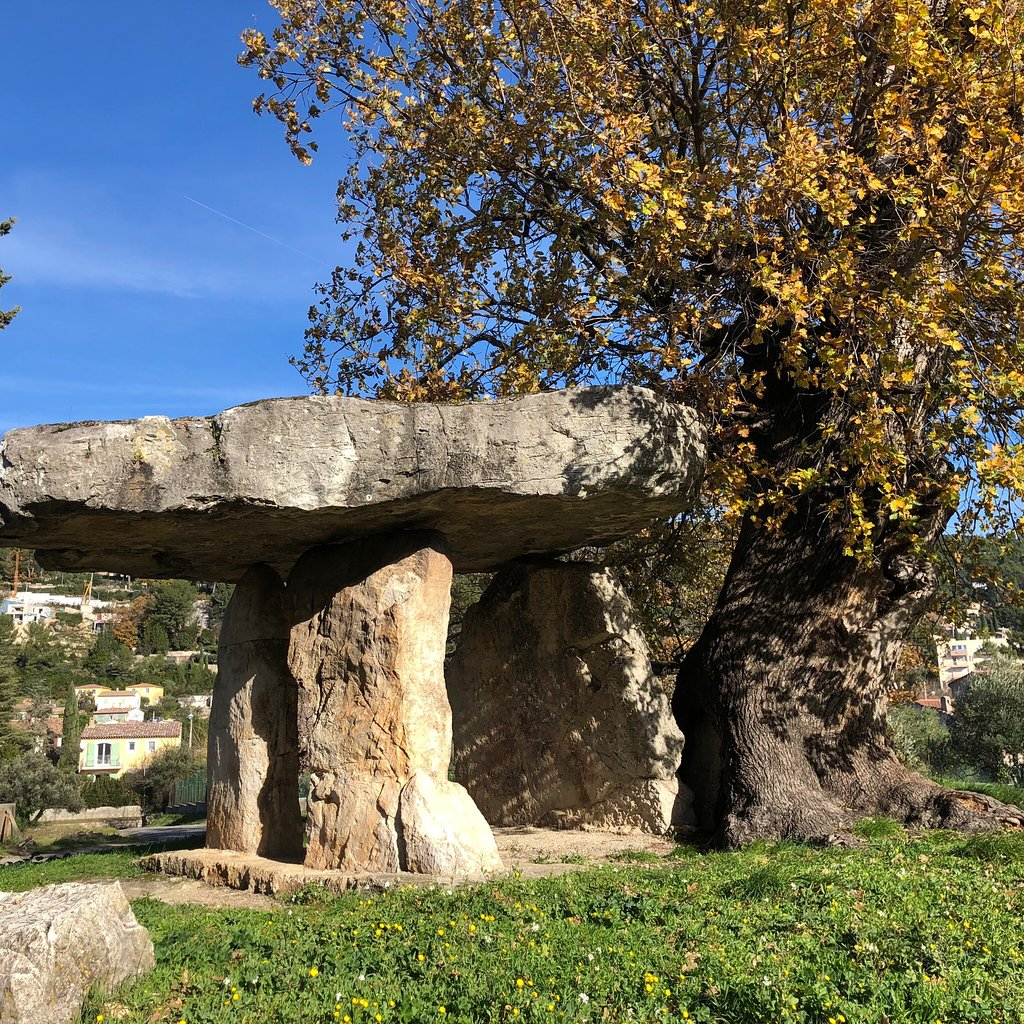
- The dolmen in 2024

- Location within France
- 43.544771°N 6.4531°E
- Type: dolmen
- Location: Draguignan, Var, Provence-Alpes-Côte d'Azur, France

History
- Built: 2500–2000 BC

Site notes
- Height: 2.40 m (7 ft 10 in)

Monument historique
- Official name: Dolmen dit La pierre de la Fée
- Designated: 1889
- Reference no.: PA00081588

The Fairy Stone is a dolmen in Draguignan, in the south of France, classified as a monument historique since 1889.

== History ==
=== Archeological material ===
During the 1844 excavations, "a flint arrowhead, two bone buttons, and one oval-shaped lead bead" were recovered. The human bones found showed no signs of burning, except for a fragment of a skull. During the last restoration in 1951, the base of all the slabs was reinforced with a concrete foundation, and the trunk of the ancient oak tree behind the headstone slab was cut to reduce the pressure it was exerting on the building. The earth extracted during the work was sifted, which made it possible to collect some archaeological material: about twenty beads (limestone, callais, lignite, serpentine), a pierced deer spittoon, and three Pomatias elegans snail opercula.

The funerary objects have been dated to the Chalcolithic period ("Copper Age").

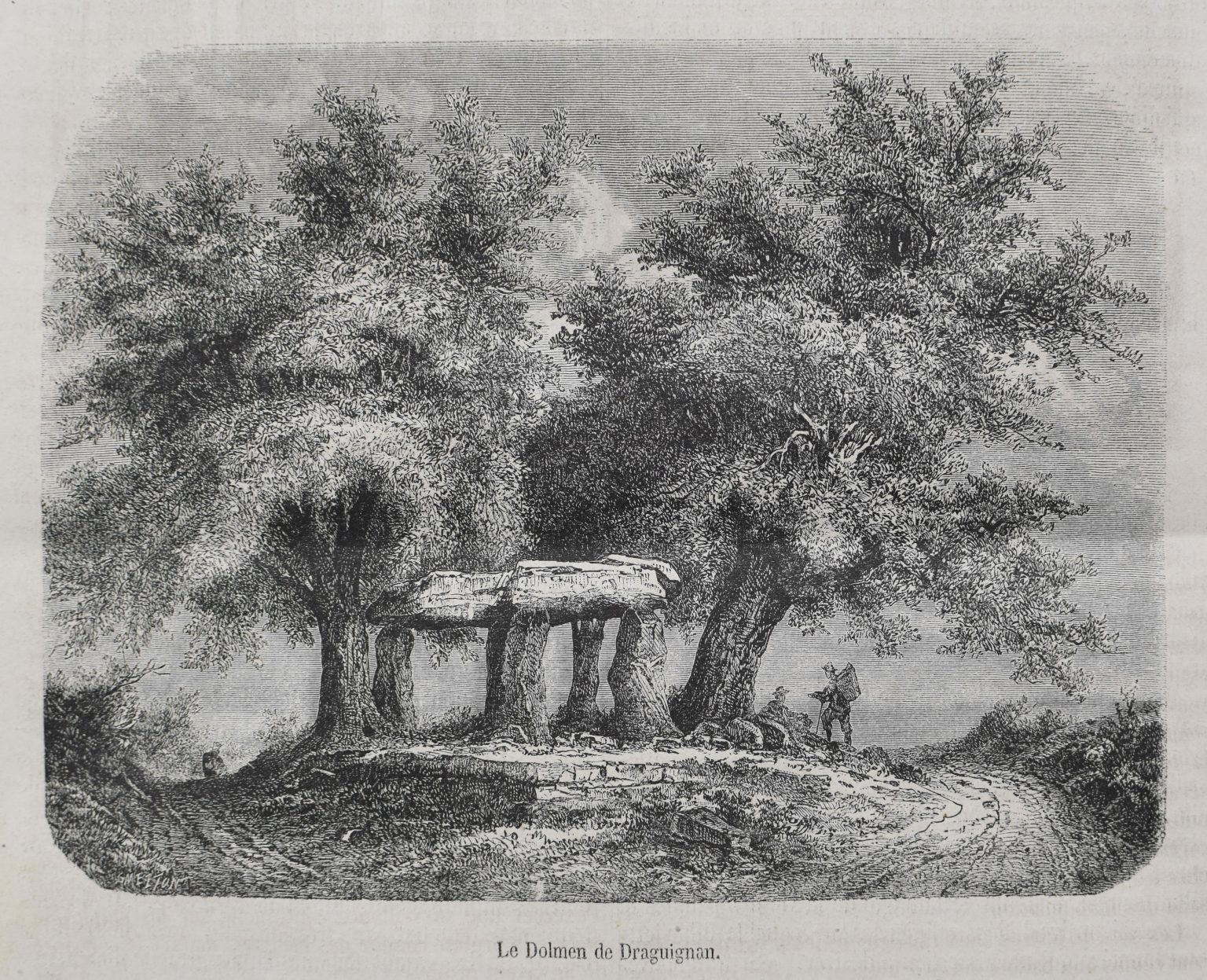
The dolmen in 1871

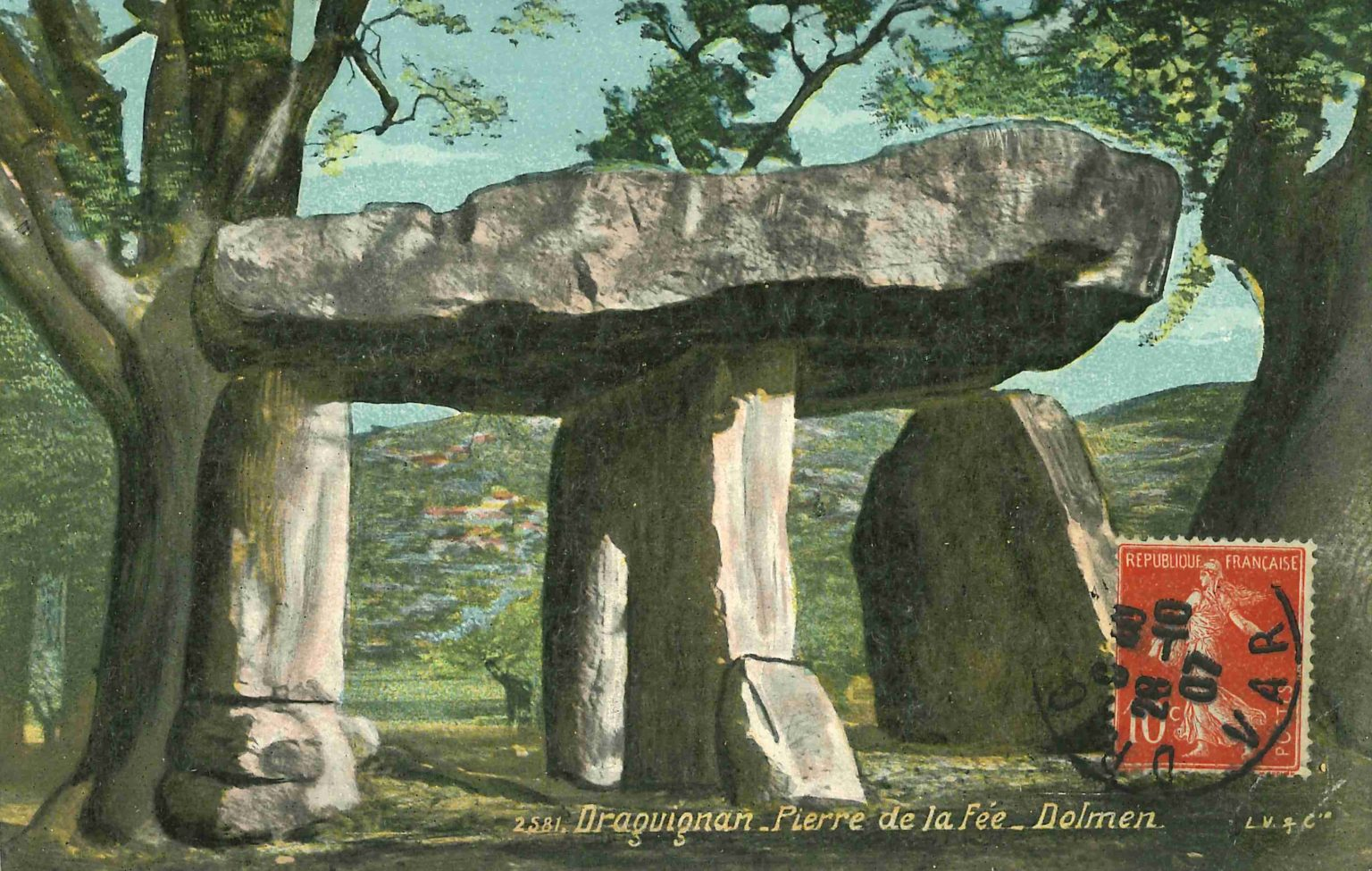
Postcard depicting the dolmen in 1907

=== The terrorist attack (1975) ===
In 1975, a resident of Draguignan who opposed the transfer of the Var prefecture to Toulon the previous year expressed his anger by blowing up the monument.

== Description ==
All that remains of the original structure are two orthostats and the chevet slab, measuring between 2.20 m and 2.40 m in height. A third support slab still existed in 1996. All elements are made of local limestone. The stone slab covering the tomb is monumental: 6 m long, 4.70 m wide and 0.58 m thick, weighing approximately 20 tons.

== In popular culture ==
During the second half of the 19th century, the dolmen was considered one of the most beautiful dolmens in France. Its location and surroundings were ideal. It was situated on a hilltop, protected by the shade of three trees: an oak, a juniper and a hackberry. Finally, it was fortunate to be located in Draguignan, the prefecture of the Var department at the time, making it easily accessible.

According to local legend, women who wanted children would visit the fairy Esterelle, who would help them conceive.
