= Gilles Garcin =

French painter (1647–1702)

- Born: 1647; Aix-en-Provence, Province of Provence, France
- Died: 1702 (aged 54–55); Aix-en-Provence, Province of Provence, France
- Occupation: Painter

Gilles Garcin (1647–1702) was a French painter.

== Biography ==
=== Early life ===
Gilles Garcin was born in 1647 in Aix-en-Provence.

=== Career ===
Three of his paintings are displayed inside the Église Saint-Jean-de-Malte: Le Christ apparaissant à sainte Madeleine au jardin, Le Miracle de saint Blaise, and Notre-Dame de Bon-Repos. Additionally, his painting entitled La Vierge et Saint Jean is displayed in the Cathédrale Saint-Sauveur.

Most of his work was done in his hometown of Aix-en-Provence. He also spent time working in Apt, Rians and Toulon. He visited Rome, Italy with a patron and painters Nicolas Pinson (1636-1681) and Reynaud Levieux (1613-1699).

=== Death ===
He died in 1702 in Aix-en-Provence.
