= Draguignan =

Subprefecture of Var, Provence-Alpes-Côte d'Azur, France

Draguignan Draguinhan (Occitan)
- Subprefecture and commune
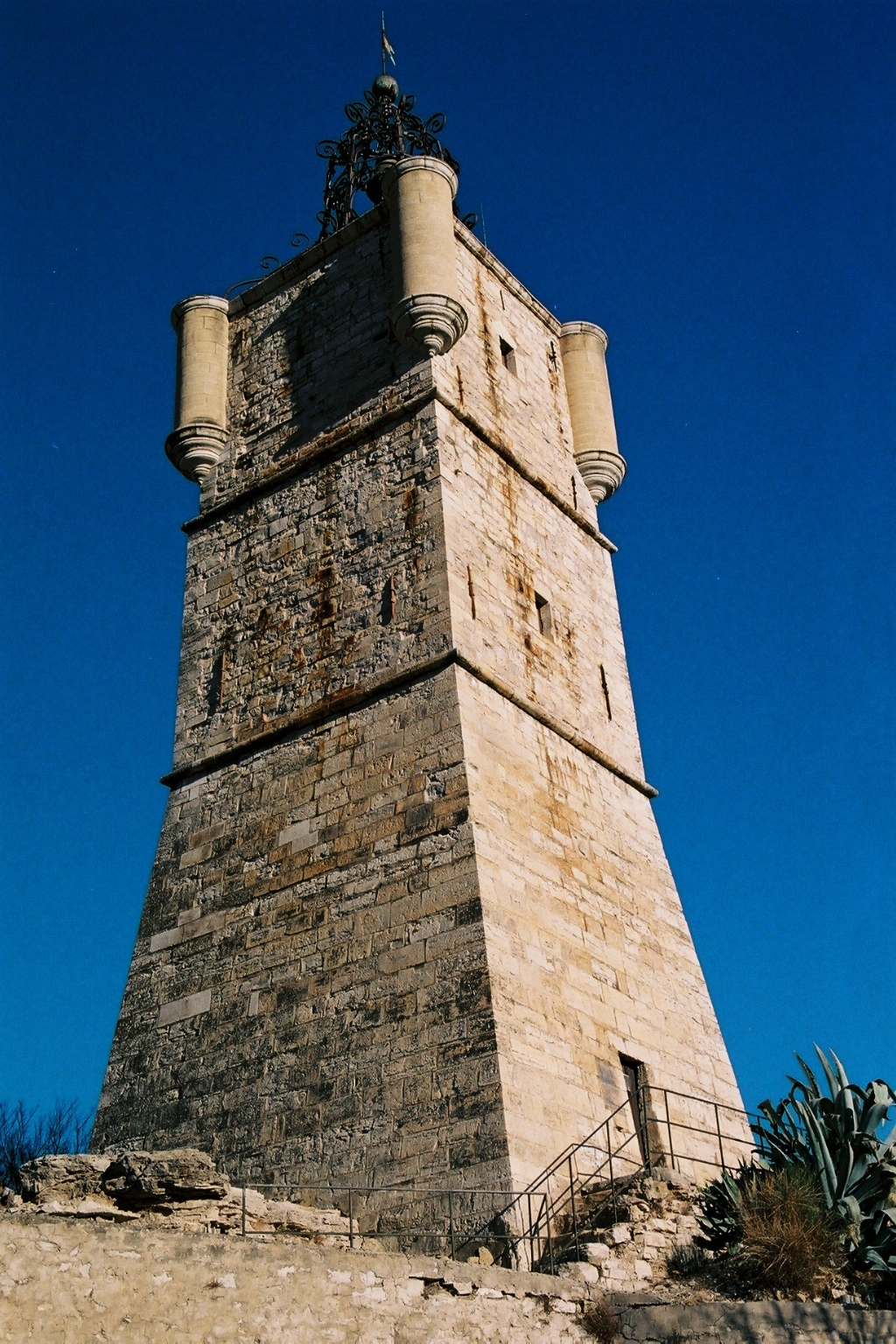
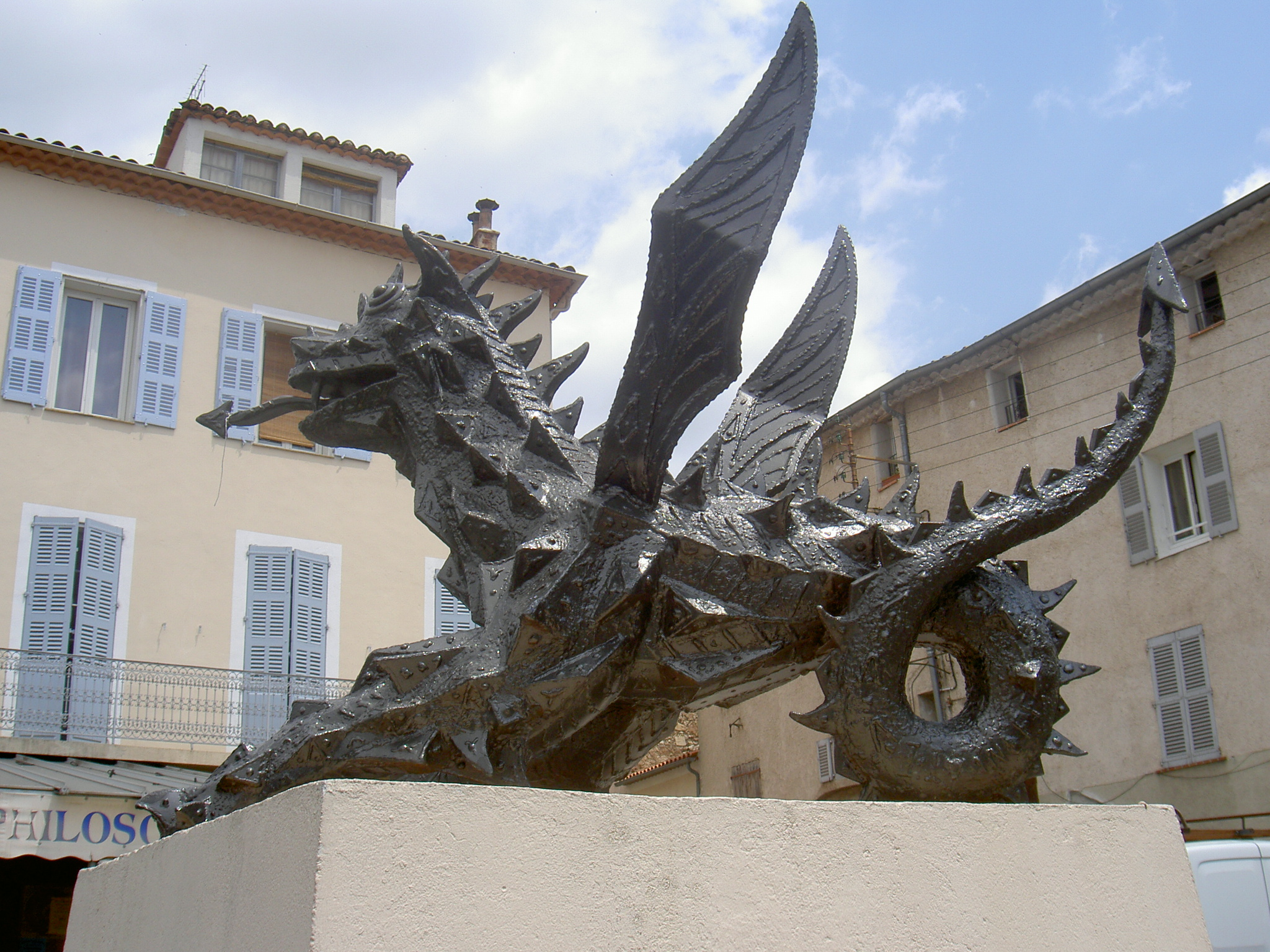
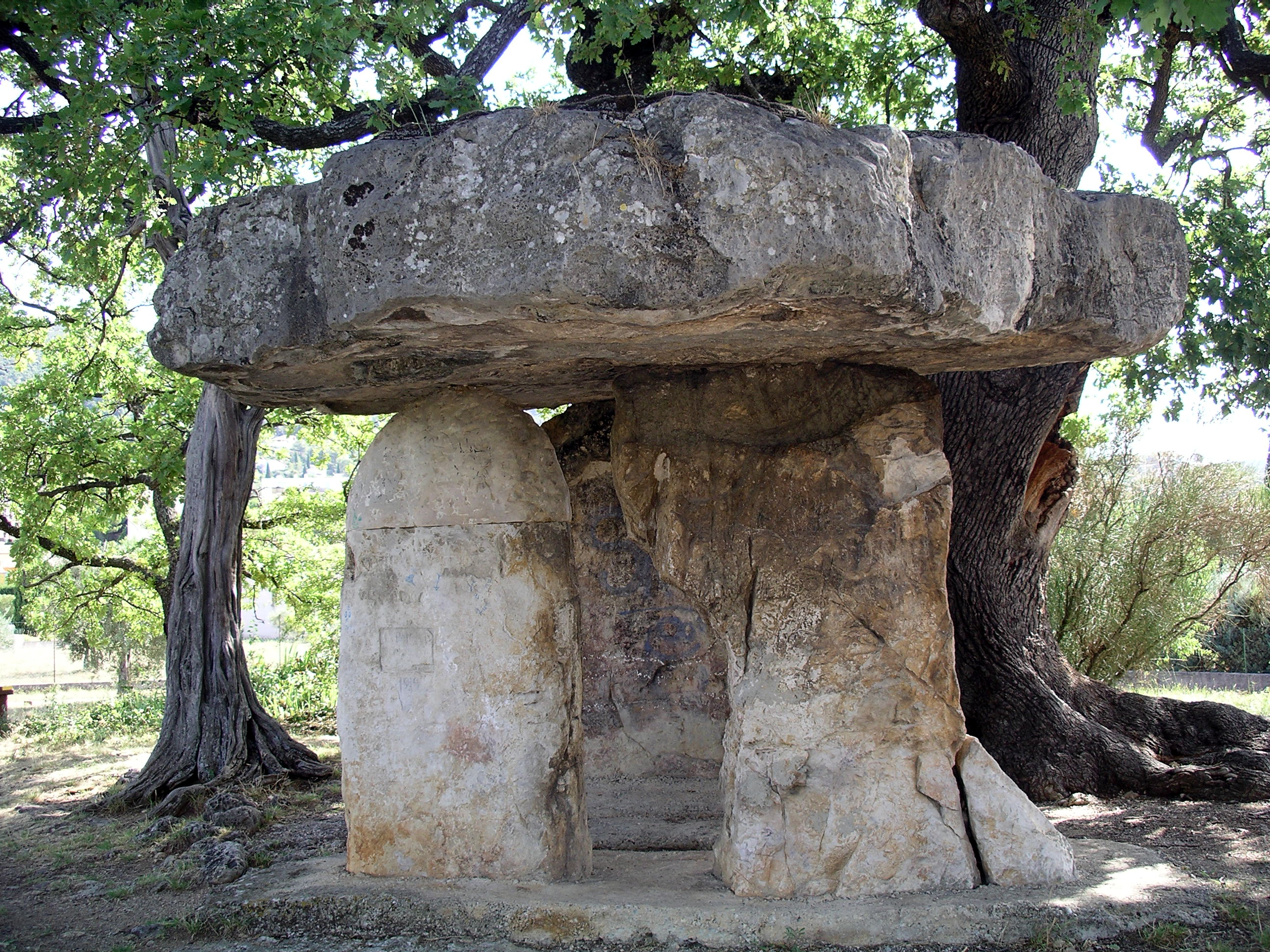
- From top to bottom and left to right: the Clock Tower, statue of a dragon, the Fairy Stone, aerial view of the city.

- Coat of arms
- Location of Draguignan
- Location within France Location within Provence-Alpes-Côte d'Azur
- Coordinates: 43°32′25″N 6°28′00″E
- Country: France
- Region: Provence-Alpes-Côte d'Azur
- Department: Var
- Arrondissement: Draguignan
- Canton: Draguignan
- Intercommunality: CA Dracénie Provence Verdon

Government
  - Mayor (2020–2026): Richard Strambio
- Area^{1}: 53.7 km^{2} (20.7 sq mi)
- Elevation: 181 m (594 ft)
- Highest elevation: 603 m (1,978 ft)
- Lowest elevation: 153 m (502 ft)
- Population (2023): 40,826
  - Density: 760/km^{2} (1,970/sq mi)
- Demonym: Dracénois
- Time zone: UTC+01:00 (CET)
  - Summer (DST): UTC+02:00 (CEST)
- INSEE/Postal code: 83050 /83300
- ^{1} French Land Register data, which excludes lakes, ponds, glaciers > 1 km^{2} (0.386 sq mi or 247 acres) and river estuaries.

Draguignan (French: [dʁaɡiɲɑ̃]; Occitan: Draguinhan) is a commune in the Var department in the administrative region of Provence-Alpes-Côte d'Azur (formerly Provence), southeastern France.

Draguignan was founded in antiquity. The city stands out because of its long history and great location, just 25 km (16 mi) from the Mediterranean Sea and nestled between the French Riviera and the Verdon Regional Natural Park. The city is 42 km (26 mi) from Saint-Tropez, and 80 km (50 mi) from Nice. Its population is approximately 40,000. Additionally, the city serves as the administrative center of the Dracénie Provence Verdon urban community, which includes twenty-three municipalities and more than 110,000 residents.

The city is currently home to two military schools, the Infantry School and the Artillery School.

== Name and motto ==
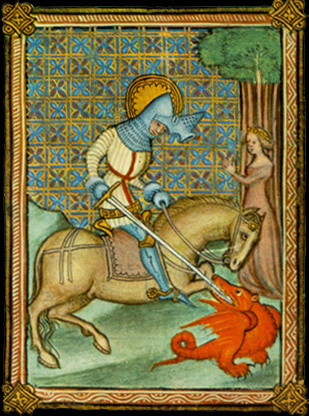
Saint-Georges killing dragon, 15th century miniature

According to legend, the name of the city is derived from the Latin name "Draco/Draconem" (dragon): a bishop, called Saint Hermentaire, killed a dragon and saved people.

The Latin motto of Draguignan is Alios nutrio, meos devoro (I nourish others, I devour my own).

== Geography ==
The elevation is 200 m. The highest hill near Draguignan is Malmont (551 m). The main river near Draguignan is the Nartuby.

The city is set in a valley NW-SE, about 2 km (1 mi) wide.

=== Climate ===
Under the Köppen climate classification, Draguignan falls within the Mediterranean climate zone (Csa), with mild and wet winters, and hot and dry summers, with most of the precipitation occurring during the autumn months of October and November. Frost is rare and temperatures rarely fall below freezing. Furthermore, the town is protected from wind by the Malmont peak and the western massif of the Selves.

Comparison of local Meteorological data with other cities in France
Town	Sunshine (hours/yr)	Rain (mm/yr)	Snow (days/yr)	Storm (days/yr)	Fog (days/yr)
National average	1,973	770	14	22	40
Draguignan	2,714	734	1	29	1
Paris	1,661	637	12	18	10
Nice	2,724	767	1	29	1
Strasbourg	1,693	665	29	29	56
Brest	1,605	1,211	7	12	75

Climate data for Draguignan (1991−2020 normals, extremes 1996−present)
Month	Jan	Feb	Mar	Apr	May	Jun	Jul	Aug	Sep	Oct	Nov	Dec	Year
Record high °C (°F)	22.7 (72.9)	25.2 (77.4)	27.1 (80.8)	29.5 (85.1)	35.0 (95.0)	40.8 (105.4)	40.0 (104.0)	40.0 (104.0)	34.9 (94.8)	30.8 (87.4)	25.1 (77.2)	22.6 (72.7)	40.8 (105.4)
Mean daily maximum °C (°F)	12.6 (54.7)	14.0 (57.2)	17.2 (63.0)	20.0 (68.0)	24.2 (75.6)	28.9 (84.0)	31.8 (89.2)	31.8 (89.2)	27.1 (80.8)	21.9 (71.4)	16.2 (61.2)	12.9 (55.2)	21.6 (70.9)
Daily mean °C (°F)	7.3 (45.1)	8.1 (46.6)	11.0 (51.8)	13.8 (56.8)	17.8 (64.0)	22.1 (71.8)	24.7 (76.5)	24.6 (76.3)	20.5 (68.9)	16.3 (61.3)	11.1 (52.0)	7.9 (46.2)	15.4 (59.7)
Mean daily minimum °C (°F)	2.0 (35.6)	2.2 (36.0)	4.8 (40.6)	7.6 (45.7)	11.4 (52.5)	15.2 (59.4)	17.5 (63.5)	17.4 (63.3)	13.9 (57.0)	10.6 (51.1)	6.0 (42.8)	2.8 (37.0)	9.3 (48.7)
Record low °C (°F)	−7.8 (18.0)	−8.0 (17.6)	−6.8 (19.8)	−1.1 (30.0)	4.2 (39.6)	5.8 (42.4)	10.1 (50.2)	10.1 (50.2)	4.1 (39.4)	−3.1 (26.4)	−6.2 (20.8)	−8.8 (16.2)	−8.8 (16.2)
Average precipitation mm (inches)	69.1 (2.72)	52.1 (2.05)	55.4 (2.18)	78.4 (3.09)	65.9 (2.59)	61.3 (2.41)	19.8 (0.78)	35.0 (1.38)	69.5 (2.74)	111.3 (4.38)	157.2 (6.19)	90.0 (3.54)	865.0 (34.06)
Average precipitation days (≥ 1.0 mm)	5.8	5.3	5.7	7.1	6.4	4.1	2.2	3.2	4.6	6.7	8.4	6.6	66.1
Source: Météo-France

=== Geology ===
The hills downstream of Draguignan date from the Middle Triassic, while those that rise upstream belong to the Upper Triassic.

Up North, we can see a long bar of stony plateau, with summits made of Jurassic limestones, sometimes intersected by deep canyons. This northern region of the "baous" or also called massive mountainous barriers, deeply wrinkled and fractured, reveals successive basins in the east–west direction.

Draguignan is in a zone of moderate risk of seismicity.

== Communication routes ==
=== Roads ===
There is no highway going through the city of Draguignan but the town is directly connected by the D 1555 to a major highway, the A8.

A bypass route makes it possible to avoid the city center from the south when arriving from Trans-en-Provence and to get to the hospital in the north of the city more quickly.

The city is located 869 km away from Paris, 141 km from Marseille, 89 km from Nice, 86 km from Toulon, 30 km from Fréjus, 105 km from Digne-les-Bains and about 35 km from the Gulf of Saint-Tropez.

=== Rail transport ===
Since 1981, the closest railway station is Les Arcs–Draguignan, which is served by the TGV and is located twelve kilometers from the city center. Bus shuttles have been set by the agglomeration community of Draguignan from the former railway station of Draguignan, which was converted into a bus station. Draguignan train station features two turnstiles: one for SNCF and another for the transport of the agglomeration.

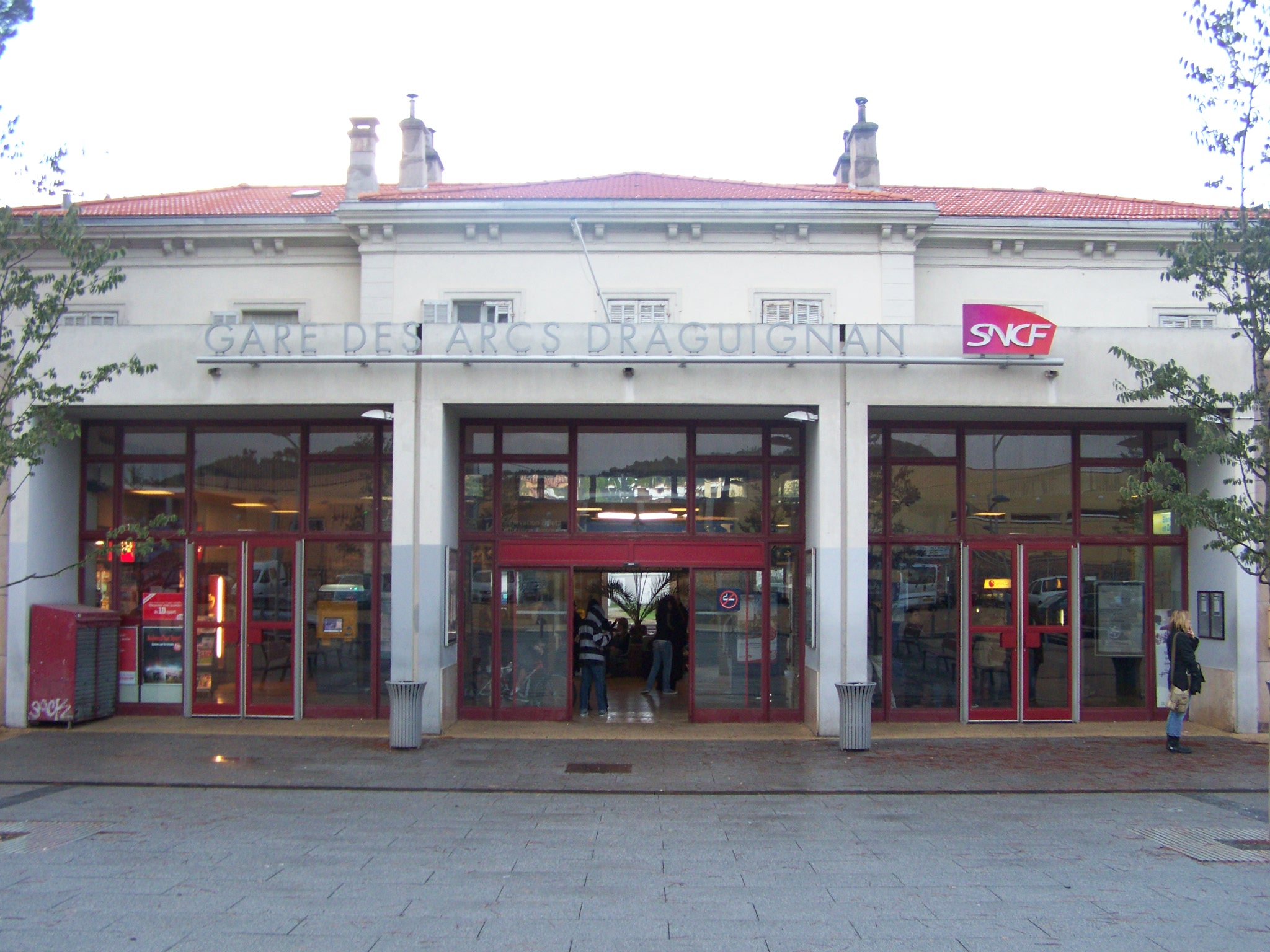
Les Arcs-Draguignan Station

Another station is currently under development in the municipality of Le Muy.

=== Public transport services ===
==== TEDBUS ====
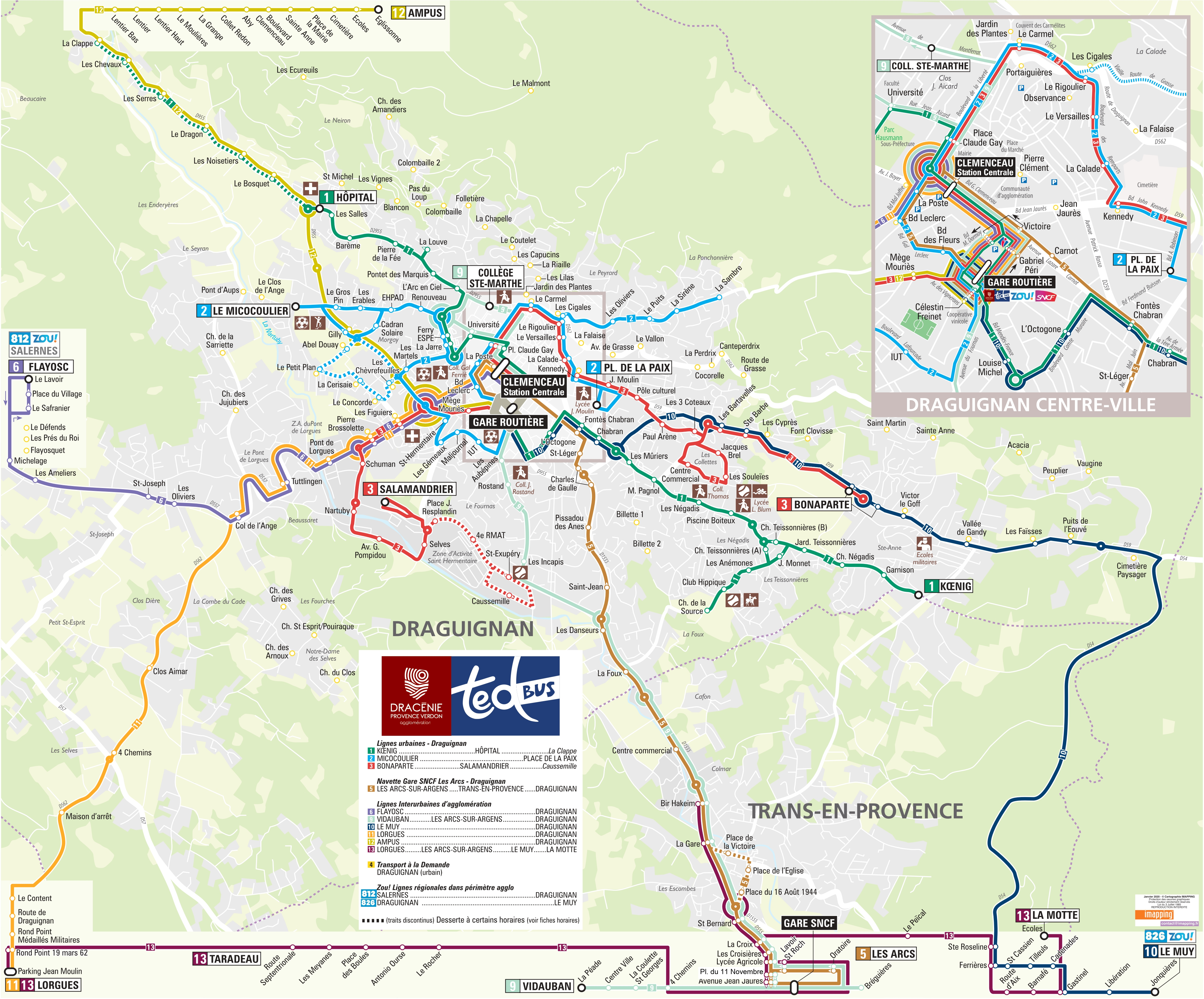
Draguignan bus network map in 2025

Urban transports are managed by the TED community, which offers three urban lines as well as lines to other municipalities such as Les Arcs-Draguignan, Ampus, Flayosc, Le Muy and Lorgues. The buses of the General Council of the Var serve from Draguignan the cities of Toulon, Brignoles, Aups, Fayence, Fréjus and Le Luc.

A project by BHNS is being studied, to connect Draguignan city center to Les Arcs-Draguignan station in 17 minutes instead of 25 minutes currently. Currently, TEDBUS line 5 provides access to the station.

==== Zou ! ====
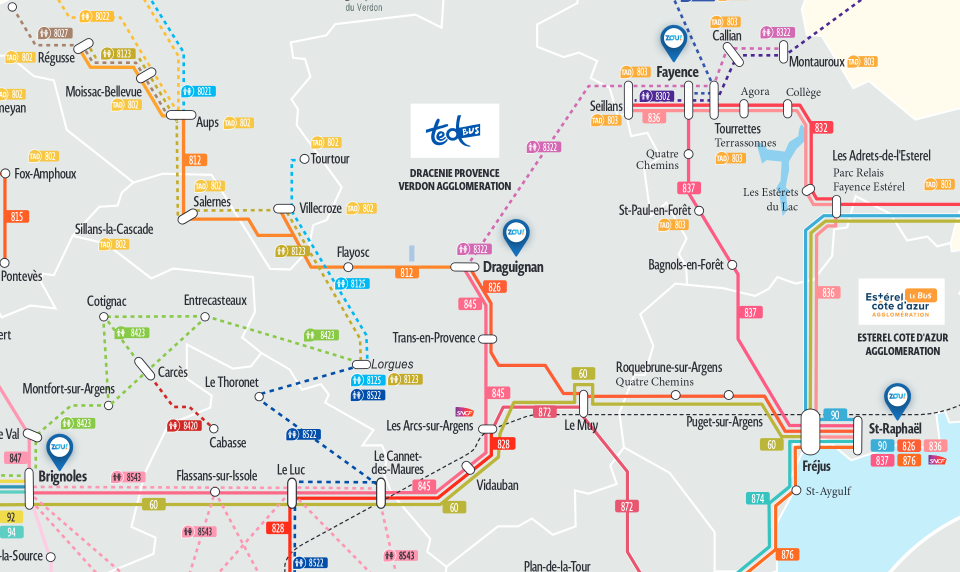
Zou ! network map, zoom on Draguignan

The Zou! network offers both rail and intercity bus services. There are three local lines that pass through Draguignan: to Aups 812, towards Le Luc 826, towards Saint-Raphaël 845.

== History ==
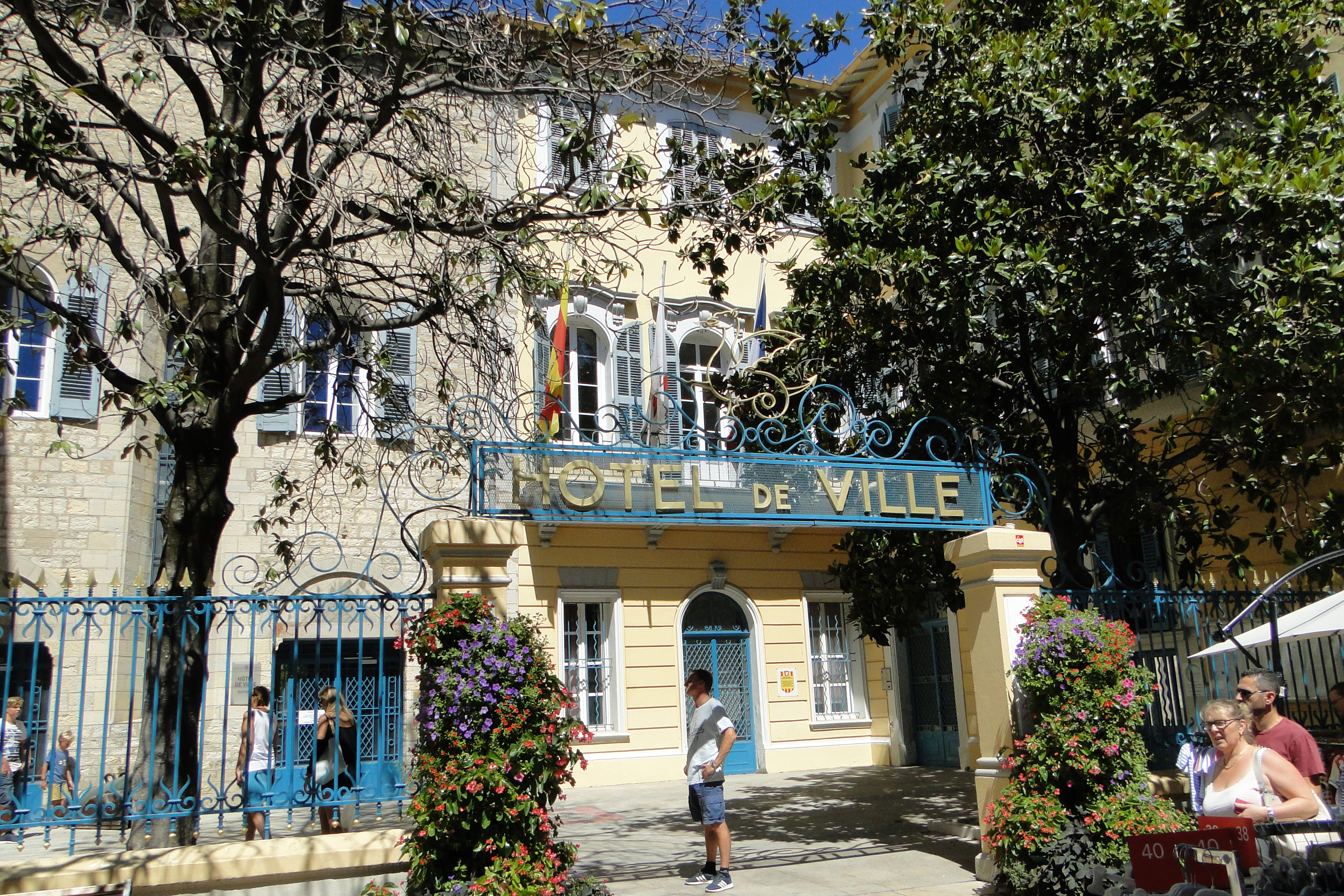
The Hôtel de Ville

The name of Draguignan ("Draconianum") appeared for the first time in 909. During the Middle-Ages, Draguignan was a small village whose people lived from olive and grape cultivation. The Hôtel de Ville is situated within the grounds of the former Convent of the Cordeliers which dates from 1265.

Draguignan became the "prefecture" of the Var in 1790, at the beginning of the French Revolution. This was despite the town by far not being the biggest city in the department. It remained the seat of the prefecture until 1974. In the 19th century and during a large part of the 20th century, the people of Draguignan (in French: "Dracénois", in English: "Draceners") voted for liberal parties (Radical-Socialist Party, Socialist Party).

The town was occupied by the Wehrmacht in 1942-44 and freed in August 1944, after Operation Dragoon. The city welcomed the "École nationale d'artillerie" (Artillery School) in 1976, then the "École nationale d'infanterie" (Infantry School) in 2010. The arrival of the military involved the development of the city : the small town became a city in the second part of the 20th century : 13,400 citizens in 1954, 33,000 in 2000, 38,000 in 2010. On June 15, 2010, the city was flooded. Torrential rain caused the deaths of 12 people in the town and 25 in the neighborhoods.

== Population ==
Historical population

Year	Pop.	±% p.a.
1793	6,113	—
1800	6,561	+1.02%
1806	8,010	+3.38%
1821	8,616	+0.49%
1831	9,804	+1.30%
1836	9,794	−0.02%
1841	8,588	−2.59%
1846	9,876	+2.83%
1851	8,972	−1.90%
1856	11,052	+4.26%
1861	10,082	−1.82%
1866	9,819	−0.53%
1872	9,446	−0.64%
1876	9,223	−0.60%
1881	9,133	−0.20%
1886	9,753	+1.32%
1891	9,816	+0.13%
1896	9,963	+0.30%
1901	9,671	−0.59%

Year	Pop.	±% p.a.
1906	9,770	+0.20%
1911	9,974	+0.41%
1921	9,199	−0.81%
1926	9,441	+0.52%
1931	11,418	+3.88%
1936	12,130	+1.22%
1946	11,801	−0.27%
1954	13,402	+1.60%
1962	14,522	+1.01%
1968	18,376	+4.00%
1975	21,448	+2.23%
1982	26,667	+3.16%
1990	30,183	+1.56%
1999	32,829	+0.94%
2007	37,117	+1.55%
2012	37,476	+0.19%
2017	39,340	+0.98%
2023	40,826	+0.62%

Source: EHESS and INSEE (1968-2023)

== Major attractions ==
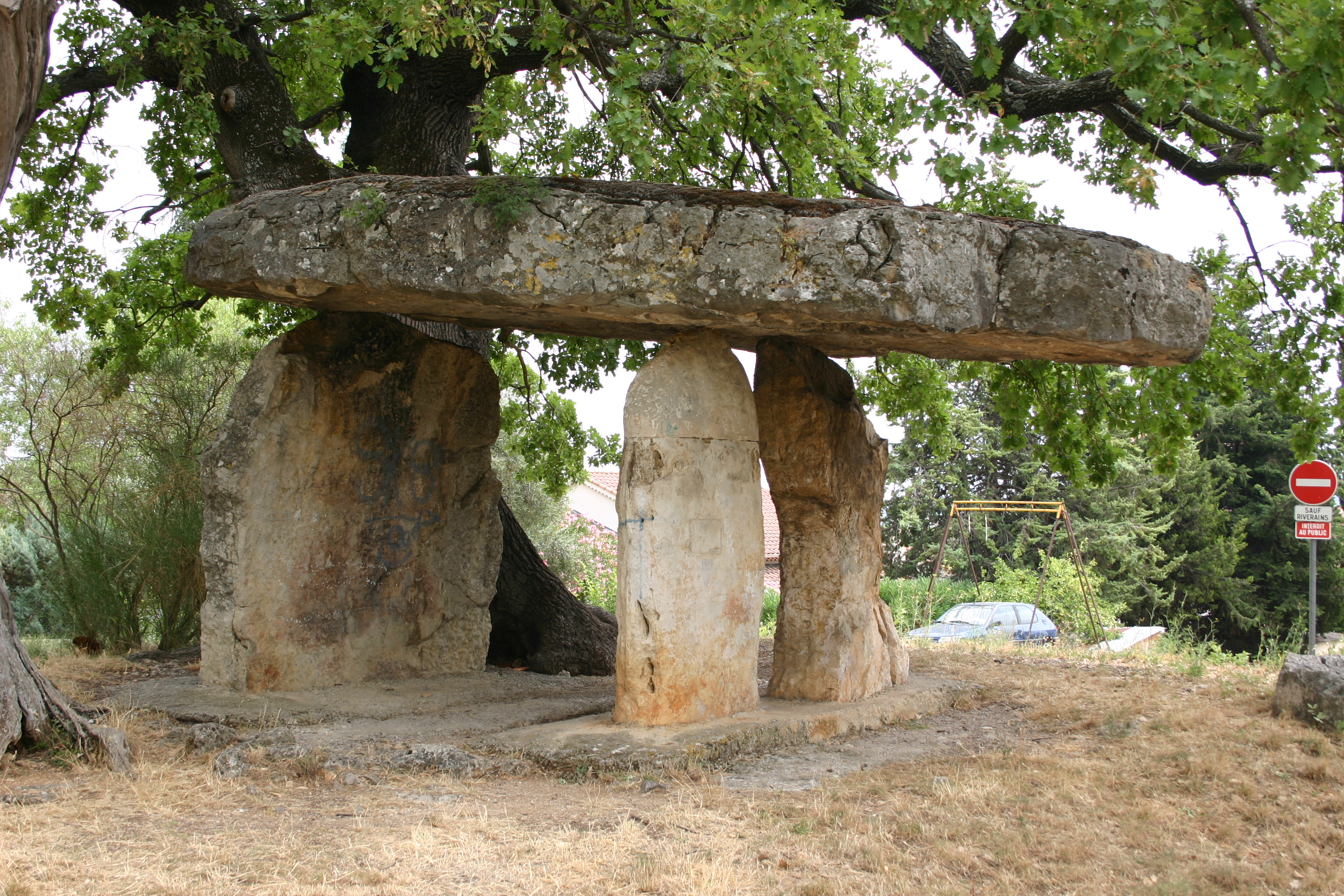
The Dolmen in Draguignan

- Museum of Artillery (Napoleonic Wars, World War I, World War II, Indochina, etc.)
- Museum of "Arts et traditions populaires"
- Museum of Fine Arts
- Rhone American Cemetery and Memorial (American World War II cemetery) (see operation Dragoon)
- The Eglise St Michel
- Eglise Notre-Dame du Peuple
- The Dolmen Pierre de la fée (fairy's Stone), also known as the fruit rock.

== Personalities connected to Draguignan ==
- Nicolas Agnesi, born in Draguignan
- Karl "Psycho" Amoussou, MMA fighter in Bellator Fighting Championships, born in Draguignan.
- Jean-Marie Auberson, died in Draguignan
- Sébastien Bouin, rock climber, born in Draguignan
- Patricia Burke, a British actress, died in Draguignan
- Georges Clemenceau, was a politician of Draguignan: deputy of the district of Draguignan (1885–1893) and senator of the same district (1902–1920), French prime minister in 1906-1909 and 1917–1920
- Alain Connes, born in Draguignan
- Michel Constantin, died in Draguignan
- Abel Douay, born in Draguignan
- Michaël Fabre, born in Draguignan
- Gustave Ferrié, studied in Draguignan
- Estève Garcin, born in Draguignan
- Claude Gay, born in Draguignan
- Maximin Isnard, was a politician of Draguignan
- Michel Lafourcade, died in Draguignan
- Hippolyte Mège-Mouriès, born in Draguignan
- Charlotte Morel, born in Draguignan
- Louis Moréri, studied in Draguignan
- Henri Mulet, French organist and composer, spent the last 30 years of his life in Draguignan, as organist of the cathedral there.
- Émile Ollivier, was a politician of Draguignan: deputy of the district of Draguignan, then prime minister in 1870
- Lily Pons, born in Draguignan
- Ronald Searle, a British artist, died in Draguignan
- Philippe Seguin, studied in Draguignan
- Georges Thill, died in Draguignan
- Christopher Tolkien, lived in Draguignan from 1975 until his death in January 2020

== Twin towns ==
- Tuttlingen, Germany

== Pictures ==
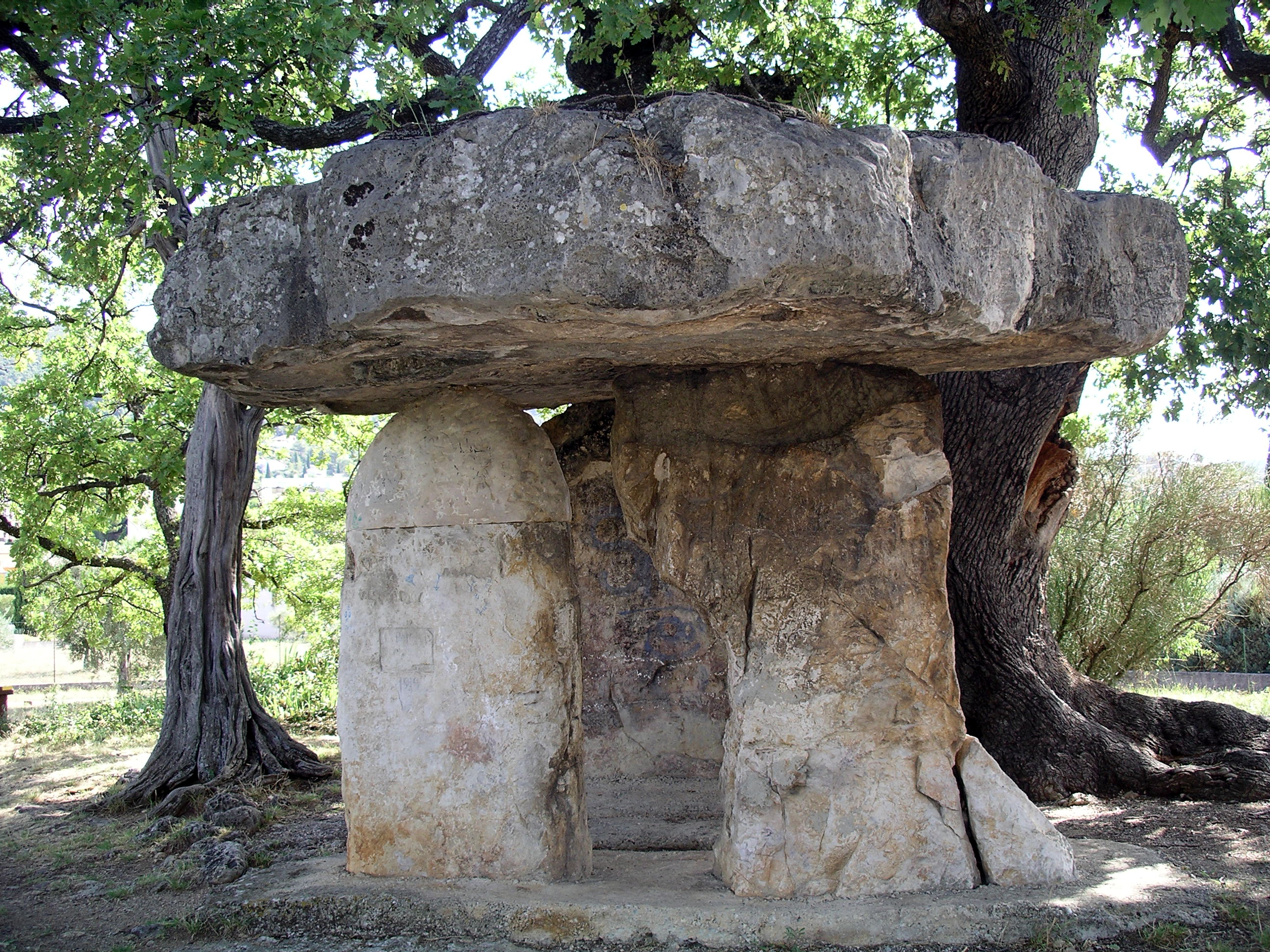
The Dolmen Pierre de la fée.

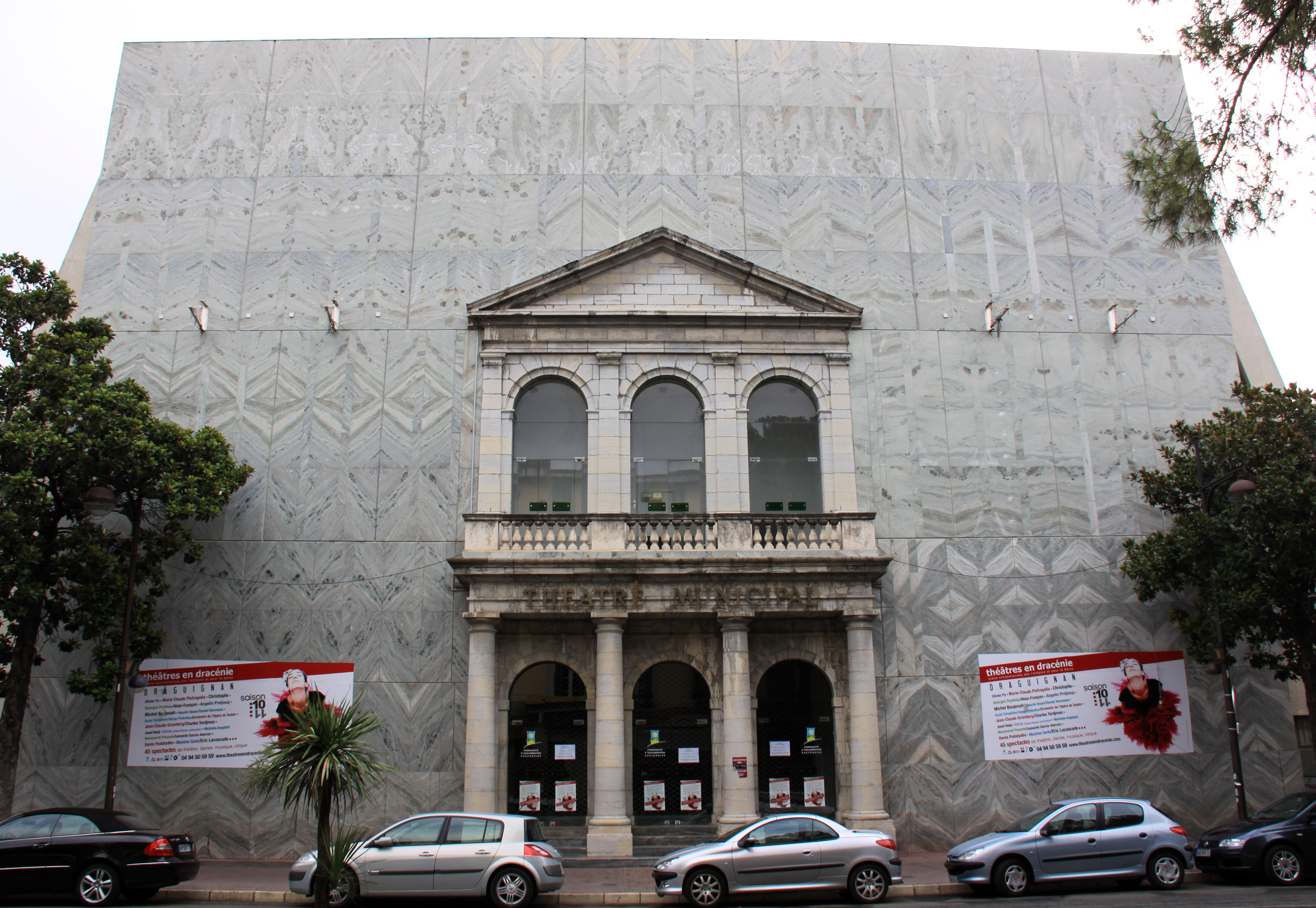
The Town Theatre of Draguignan (Théatre Municipal).

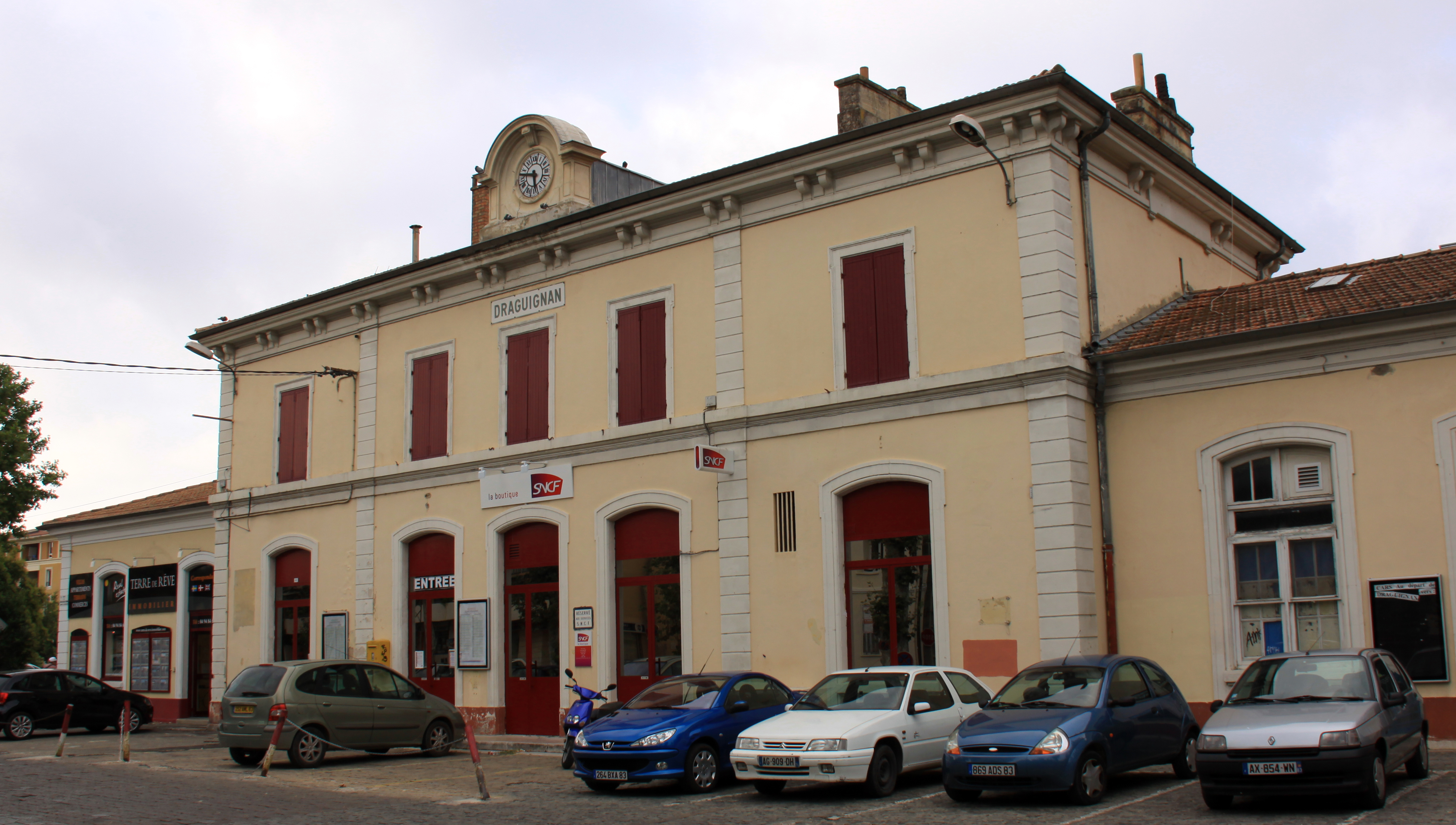
The old Railway Station, which is still called Gare SNCF even though the tracks from Les Arcs to Draguignan have gone

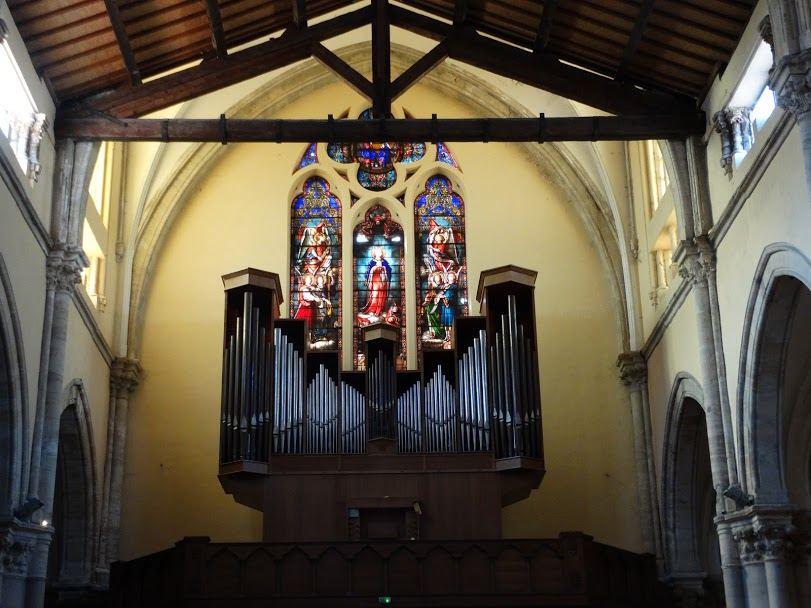
Organ in the church of Saint Michael

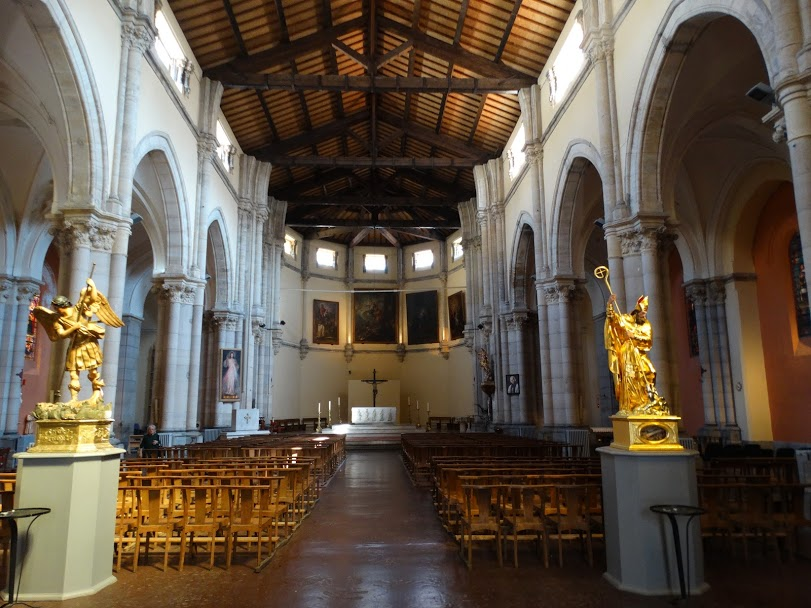
The church of Saint Michael

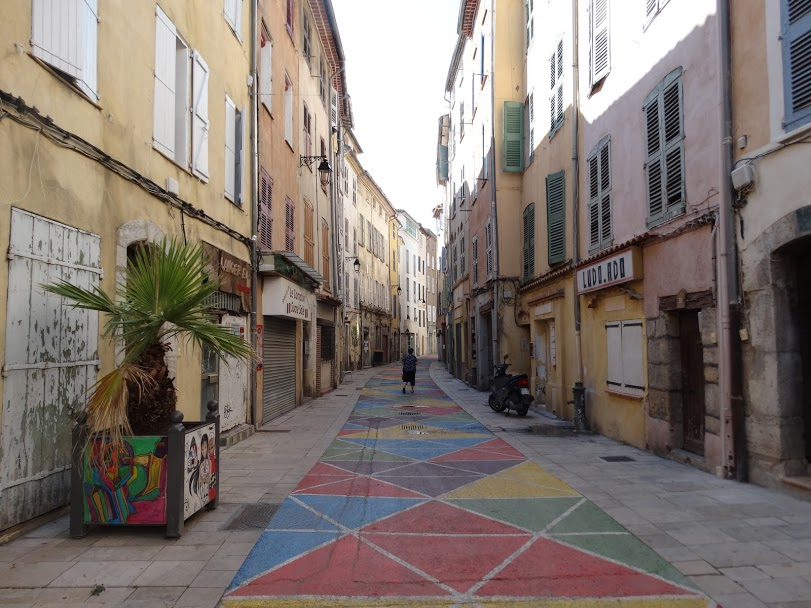
Art pieces on the street in Draguignan

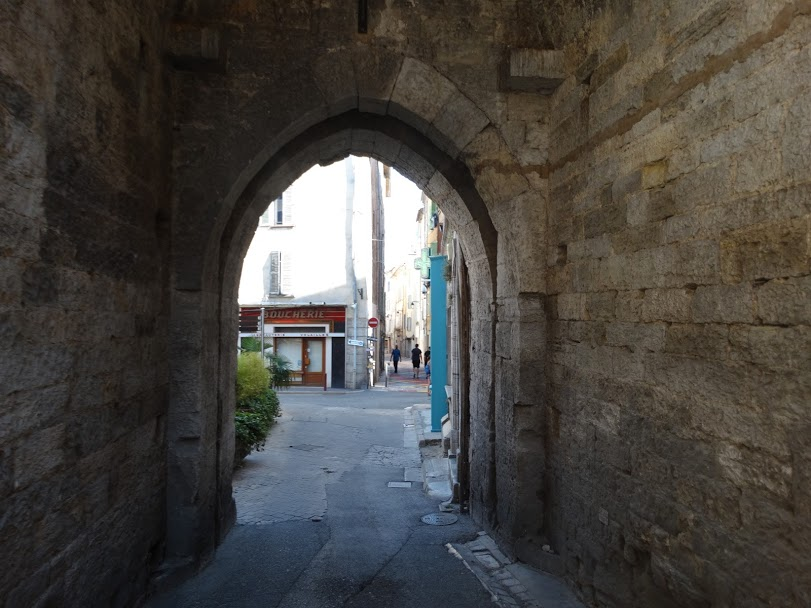
Draguignan In the old city

== See also ==
- Communes of the Var department
- List of works by Auguste Carli
