= Estève Garcin =

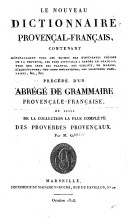
Garcin's dictionary

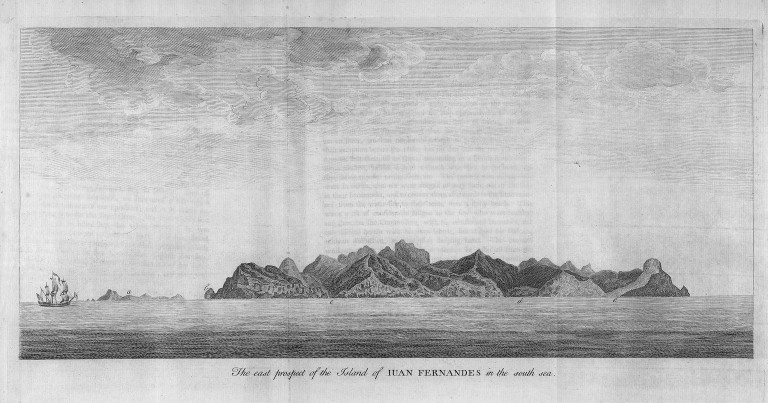
La Robinsona takes place on Robinson Crusoe's island

Estève Garcin (in French Étienne Garcin, born 16 April 1784 – died 23 November 1859 in Draguignan) was an Occitan language writer from Provence.

Garcin was a teacher and political monarchist who is the author of two major works:

- La Roubinsouna Prouvençalo (La Robinsona porvençala in classical Occitan) is a very important novel in Occitan literature which was written in the provençal dialect from the Var department. The novel deals with a group of Provençal who reconstruct their civilization after a shipwreck on an island in the Pacific Ocean.
- A French and Provençal dictionary that aimed to help Occitan speakers to switch to French.

It has been noted that these works are contradictory in nature given that one strengthens the Occitan literature and language by providing it with a novel, while the second is a tool that explicitly aims at helping Occitan readers switch to French.

== Bibliography ==
- Garcin, Etienne. La Roubinsouno prouvençalo. Les Presses du Midi : 2010.
