= Alfred Clouët =

Alfred George Clouët

Alfred George Clouët (29 September 1866 – 7 February 1949) was a French businessman who founded the Ayam Brand in Singapore. The company, an import-export firm, was initially known as A. Clouet & Co. The use of a rooster on its logo eventually led to it being renamed Ayam Brand. The company's original products included chocolates, wines and perfumes but it became most known for importing canned sardines.

== Early life ==
Clouët was born the son of a tailor in Le Havre, France, on 29 September 1866. His family lived at 164 Rue de Normandie, now known as Rue Aristide-Briand, where his parents, who had settled in the city a decade prior, ran a "clothing, tailoring and haberdashery" shop. He had an older sister and a younger brother. Clouët never served in the army. Clouët departed for New York aboard the Normandie on 8 June 1889. He arrived on 17 June and registered as a trader of Swiss origin. On 1 April 1890, he married Berthe Dragon, who also came from Le Havre, having arrived in New York on 27 May.

== Career ==
Clouët came to Singapore in 1891 and began working as an assistant at C. Labarbe & Co., which imported cigars into Singapore from Manila. After Labarbe left for Marseille on 13 July 1892, Clouët established the import-export firm A. Clouet & Co. He announced the following year, that he would be importing premium products, including Menier Chocolate, Bénédictine, Bordeaux wine and French perfumes. The business was funded through the 2,000 francs obtained on 20 October and the 1,000 francs obtained on 3 March 1893. He also claimed in January 1895 to have received $ 4,535.85 from Berthe across several installments. In 1893, Clouët convinced the 18 year-old Victor Clumeck, who had previously worked for canned pineapple importer Joseph Bastiani, to stay in Singapore and work for him as an assistant. In 1896, he introduced a new logo for the company featuring a rooster, a symbol of France, which his company would come to be known for. As Malay was then the "language of the marketplace" in Singapore, the brand came to be known as Ayam Brand, as "ayam" is Malay for chicken. Initially operating out of 79 Waterloo Street, he moved the business to a new premises at 3 Malacca Street. In July 1898, a lawsuit was filed against him for having erected a boundary wall at 79 Waterloo Street without having obtained permission from Samuel Tomlinson, then the municipal engineer.

Clouët began importing canned sardines in 1899. He submitted his product to the Exposition Universelle, held in Paris in 1900, where they won gold medals. In May, he began acting as Belgian consul in the absence of L. Groetars. In November, he purchased the S.S. Neera from the Straits Steamship Company "for account of a Saigon concern." On 21 March 1901, his warehouses on Malacca Street were destroyed by a fire. He established a temporary office at 8 Battery Road and then moved the business to 7 Raffles Quay. The success of his business was acknowledged by Jouffroy d'Abbans, the French consul to Singapore, in a 1901 report on French trade with the Straits Settlements. He began importing other canned goods, such as canned mushrooms and canned peas, although the canned sardines remained particularly popular. Clouët also submitted his products to the Hanoi Exhibition, held in November 1902, where they won a silver medal. On 1 January 1904, Clumeck became a partner of the business. Clouët's perfume brand came to be known as "Ayer Wangi, Chop Ayam". It was "so well known" that an A. Gaffoor established a perfume brand named "Chop Dua Ayam". In February, he filed for an injunction against Gaffoor. After winning the suit, he published a notice in The Straits Times announcing his victory. Clouët began placing advertisements in The Straits Times in that year. He also placed advertisements in other major newspapers across Malaya.

In 1907, Clouët and Clumeck entered a partnership with Abraham Frankel as furniture dealers and marble importers. Clouët filed a suit against Chiong Fye Wan for "applying a false trade mark to bottles of scent." Chiong's perfume featured a rooster on the logo and the words 'Messrs. Clouët & Co.' in Malay. He was fined $25 and his products were confiscated. Timothy Pwee, writing for BiblioAsia, argued that the "best testament to the strength of a brand is, ironically, the imitators it attracts and the consequent need of the brand owner to defend his trademark." The partnership between Clouët, Clumeck and Frankel was dissolved on 7 December 1910. Although it was claimed that the brand's products were canned in Singapore, there are no records that demonstrate the existence for a cannery in the Malay peninsula in the 20th century. The company had a stall at the Malaya-Borneo Exhibition, held in Singapore in 1922, which reportedly drew "many" visitors. Clouët retired on 31 December 1924 and handed ownership of the business over to Clumeck.

== Personal life and death ==
Clouët had two sons with Berthe. She gave birth to their first son in New York on 21 July 1890 and their second son on 27 April 1893. All four of them left for Marseille on 4 April 1896. However, only Clouët and Berthe returned to Singapore in October. Berthe returned to France in November 1898, dying in Paris on 20 December of the following year. He owned 105 Orchard Road, a cottage that was "one of the first homes in Singapore to be supplied with gas for cooking and lighting purposes." In January 1902, he was involved in a shipwreck. In 1906, Clouët remarried Gabrielle Le Provost de la Voltais, the widow of diplomat Ernest Frandon who came from minor Breton nobility. With her money, he acquired a collection of Chinese ceramics. Gabrielle died on 27 July 1914 and Clouët remarried Anna Maria Sansone, the daughter of a locksmith from Naples. However, they divorced in Marseilles in 1922.

On 6 March 1923, Clouët married Zeinab el-Saqqaff, the daughter of Syed Omar bin Mohamed Alsagoff and a member of the Alsagoff family, in Cairo, Egypt, five months after the end of his last marriage. The wedding followed Islamic tradition. Clouët moved to Egypt after retiring and by 1941 the couple were living in the Zamalek ward of Cairo. He was known there as Aly Farid or Ali Farid and reportedly served on the council of directors of the Suez Canal. The grandparents of archeologist Mahmoud Salek were his neighbours. Clouët died in Cairo on 7 February 1949.
