= Onana =

Onana is a surname. Notable people with the surname include:

- Amadou Onana, Belgian footballer, plays for Aston Villa and Belgium
- André Onana, Cameroonian footballer, goalkeeper for Trabzonspor (on loan) and Cameroon
- Elie Onana, Cameroonian footballer
- Hervé Ndjana Onana, Cameroonian footballer
- Jacques Onana, Cameroonian footballer
- Jean Onana, Cameroonian footballer
- Jules Onana, Cameroonian footballer
- Moshe Onana, Israeli footballer
- Nelson Onana, Belgian field hockey player
- Raphaël Onana, French-Cameroonian soldier
