= 1943–1944 Italian campaign medal =

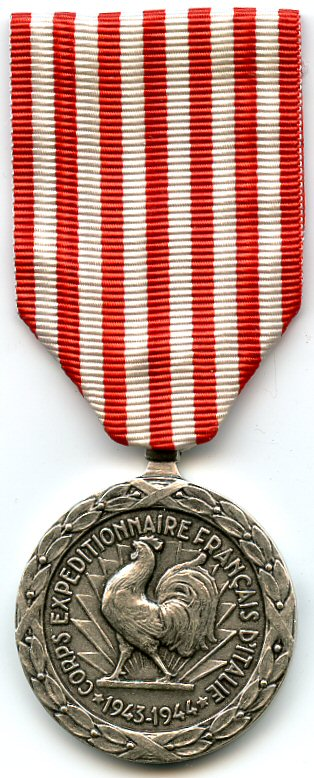
- 1943-1944 Italian campaign medal (obverse)
- Type: Commemorative war medal
- Awarded for: Military service on Italian soil or Italian waters between 1943 and 1945
- Presented by: France
- Eligibility: French soldiers and sailors
- Status: No longer awarded
- Established: 1 April 1953
- Ribbon of the 1943–1944 Italian campaign medal

Precedence
- Next (higher): United Nations operations in Korea commemorative medal
- Next (lower): Indochina Campaign commemorative medal

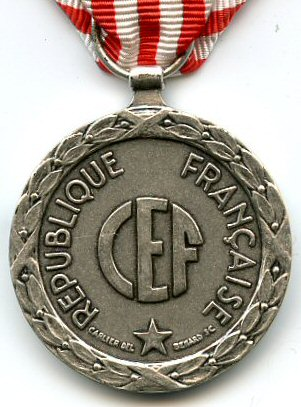
Reverse of the 1943–1944 Italian campaign medal

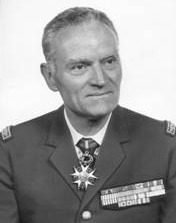
General Pierre Vincent, a recipient of the 1943–1944 Italian campaign medal

The 1943–1944 Italian campaign medal (French: Médaille commémorative de la campagne d'Italie 1943-1944) was a French commemorative campaign medal awarded to soldiers and sailors who served on Italian soil or Italian waters as part of the "French Expeditionary Corps of Italy" (French: "Corps Expéditionaire Français (CEF)") under the command of general Alphonse Juin.

The French Expeditionary Corps (CEF) participated in the allied amphibious landing and the ensuing campaign in Italy in 1943 and 1944. Composed in part of Frenchmen from North Africa and in part with colonial troops, the CEF covered itself with glory during this long campaign and especially during the battle of the Garigliano. Such was the impact of the CEF and resulting national pride following the first major action on European soil by a large French military formation that by the early 1950s, many politicians felt the "ITALIE" clasp worn on the ribbon of the 1939–1945 Commemorative war medal simply wasn't enough of a mark of respect and admiration on the part of the nation for what was in effect the resurrection of the French army in the eyes of the enemy.

In January 1953, a proposition was made in parliament by a group of its members requesting the creation of a distinct medal to adequately recognize the valour in combat and the sacrifice of the men of the CEF who lost more than 7,000 members of the 1st Free French Division. The 1943–1944 Italian campaign medal was finally established on 1 April 1953 by law 53-273.

== Award statute ==
The 1943–1944 Italian campaign medal was awarded to:

- members of the French Expeditionary Corps serving on the Italian mainland for the operations carried out between 1 December 1943 and 25 July 1944 (including on the island of Elba), regardless of the length of service in theatre;
- sailors of crews that effectively participated in operations against Italian soil occupied by the German forces between 26 July 1944 and 8 May 1945, regardless of the length of service in theatre.

Article 4 of Law 53-1009 of 10 October 1953 further added that the medal could be awarded to foreign nationals having served under French command, who met the aforementioned award prerequisites.

Article 5 of the same law directed that when worn in the presence of other French awards, the 1943–1944 Italian campaign medal was to be worn immediately after the United Nations operations in Korea commemorative medal.

Article 7 ordered the removal of the "ITALIE" clasp from Article 3 of the decree of 21 May 1946 establishing the 1939–1945 Commemorative war medal.

== Award description ==
The 1943–1944 Italian campaign medal was a 36mm in diameter silvered bronze medal. Its obverse bore the left profile view of a Gallic rooster in front of Sun rays surrounded by the relief circular inscription "CORPS EXPÉDITIONAIRE FRANÇAIS D'ITALIE * 1943-1944 *" (English: "FRENCH EXPEDITIONARY CORPS OF ITALY * 1943-1944 *") within a relief laurel wreath along the entire medal circumference. On the reverse, within the same relief laurel wreath, the circular inscription "RÉPUBLIQUE FRANÇAISE" (English: "FRENCH REPUBLIC"), at the bottom a relief five pointed star, in the center, the relief inscription "CEF".

The medal hung from a ribbon passing through a suspension ring, itself passing through the medals suspension loop. The 36mm wide silk moiré ribbon was composed of seven red and six white alternating vertical stripes of equal width.

== Noteworthy recipients (partial list) ==
- General Alphonse Juin
- Surgeon general Raoul Chavialle
- General Jean Simon
- General Maurice Henry
- General Paul Arnault
- General Pierre Vincent
- General François Sevez
- Captain Hubert Clément
- Captain André Salvat
- Chief warrant officer Rudolf Eggs

== See also ==
- Italian Campaign (World War II)
- Marocchinate: War crime during the Italian campaign
- Commemorative medal of the 1859 Italian Campaign: French campaign medal for the Second Italian War of Independence
