= Commemorative medal for voluntary service in Free France =

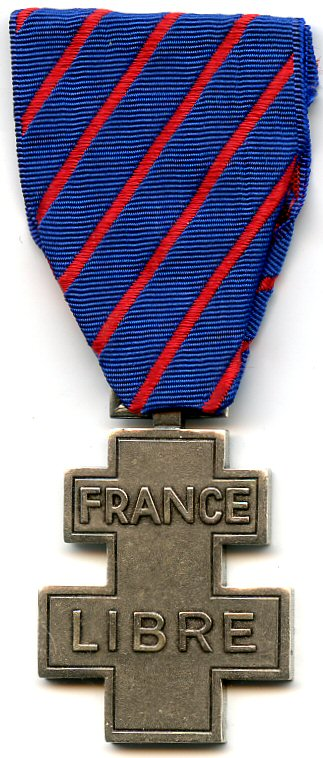
- Commemorative medal for voluntary service in Free France (obverse)
- Type: Commemorative war medal
- Awarded for: Service in the Free French Forces prior to 1 August 1943
- Presented by: France
- Eligibility: French and foreign nationals
- Status: No longer awarded
- Established: 4 April 1946
- Final award: 3 July 1958

Highlights
- Total: 13,469
- Ribbon of the Commemorative medal for voluntary service in Free France

Precedence
- Next (higher): Medal of French Gratitude
- Next (lower): United Nations operations in Korea commemorative medal

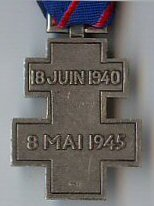
Reverse of the French Commemorative medal for voluntary service in Free France (1946)

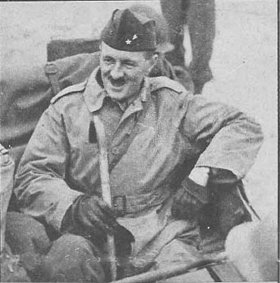
General Philippe Leclerc de Hauteclocque, a recipient of the Commemorative medal for voluntary service in Free France

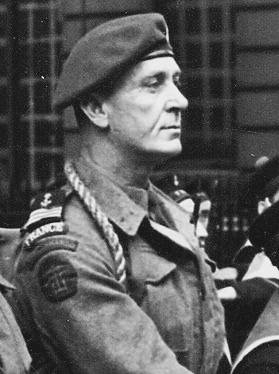
Commander Philippe Kieffer, a recipient of the Commemorative medal for voluntary service in Free France

The Commemorative medal for voluntary service in Free France (French: Médaille commémorative des services volontaires dans la France libre) was a French commemorative war medal established by decree on 4 April 1946 on the 1945 proposition of general Edgard de Larminat to the Minister to the armies.

The general proposed the creation of a distinctive award for the members of the Free French Forces who fought the Axis forces on most fronts during World War II. Beginning with a modest 7,000 men in July 1940, the Free French Forces had grown to approximately 70,000 by June 1942 and were especially active in North Africa, where they particularly distinguished themselves during the Battle of Bir Hakeim. These forces would later form the nucleus of the 1st Free French Division which distinguished itself in the Italian campaign of 1944 under general Koenig and of the 2nd Armoured Division in the liberation of Paris under general Leclerc.

Also, part of the whole, the Free French Naval Forces and Free French Air Force, although limited in numbers and equipment nonetheless took part in most major engagements alongside allied forces including in the Soviet Union. Free French Forces had grown to over half a million by 1944 and numbered well over a million in 1945, they were instrumental in the final liberation of their country and participated in the invasion of Nazi Germany.

== Award statute ==
The Commemorative medal for voluntary service in Free France was awarded to all persons, civilian or military, French or foreign nationals:

- having voluntarily contracted in the Free French Forces (including Free French air and naval forces) prior to 1 August 1943 (for soldiers);
- having effectively served Free France on the territories controlled by the National Committee in London and in foreign countries prior to 1 August 1943 (for civil servants).

The medal was bestowed accompanied by an award certificate and was often accompanied by a scroll signed by General Charles de Gaulle with the following message in French: "Answering the call of France in mortal peril, you rallied to the Free French Forces. You were of those who, in the front ranks, allowed it to win final victory! At the moment where the goal is attained, I want to thank you in friendship, simply, in the name of France! 1 September 1945."

Upon application for the award, a committee would examine and confirm or deny membership in the Free French Forces. This committee, presided by a superior staff officer of the Free French Forces, was composed of:

- an officer of each of the three services;
- a representative of the Merchant Navy;
- a representative of the Ministry of the Colonies
- a representative of civil services of the former National Committee in London;
- a representative of intelligence and action networks affiliated with the former National Committee in London;
- a member of the office of the committee of the Order of Liberation.

== Award description ==
The Commemorative medal for voluntary service in Free France was struck from silvered bronze in the shape of a Cross of Lorraine with variants of 36 mm to 40 mm high (excluding suspension ring) and 32 mm wide. Its obverse bore the relief inscription on two lines "FRANCE" on the upper horizontal arm and "LIBRE" on the lower arm (English: "FREE" "FRANCE"). Its reverse bore the dates "18 JUIN 1940" (English: "18 JUNE 1940") on the upper arm and "8 MAI 1945" (English: "8 MAY 1945") on the lower arm.

The medal hung from a dark blue silk moiré ribbon adorned with 2 mm wide red oblique (from low left to high right) stripes separated by 4 mm. The ribbon passed through a rectangular rigid suspension ring struck as an integral part of the cross.

== Noteworthy recipients ==
- General Philippe Leclerc de Hauteclocque
- The singer and dancer Josephine Baker
- General Marie-Pierre Kœnig
- General Gérard Lecointe
- General Georges Cabanier
- General Pierre Billotte
- General Pierre Garbay
- General Renaud de Corta
- General Jean Simon
- General Henri Amiel
- General Raoul Magrin-Vernerey
- General Martial Valin
- Colonel Fred Moore
- Lieutenant colonel Albert Fossey-François
- Lieutenant commander Elie Touchaleaume
- Commander Philippe Kieffer
- Wing Commander Pierre Clostermann
- Major Rudolf Eggs
- Captain François de Labouchère
- Capitan Rene Joyeuse (1920–2012), FFL/OSS
- Lieutenant Raymond Meyer
- Lieutenant René Amiot
- Lieutenant Jean-Pierre Berger
- Lieutenant Jean-Valentin Brecheisen, French commandos of Africa
- Master sergeant Raphaël Onana
- Resistance member Pierre Depoid
- Journalist Philippe Ragueneau
- Politician Marthe Simard

== See also ==
- Free French Forces
- Free French Naval Forces
- Free French Air Force
