= Ayam Brand =

Singaporean multinational food company

- Type: Private Limited
- Industry: Food processing
- Founded: 1892; 134 years ago
- Founder: Alfred Clouët
- Headquarters: Singapore
- Area served: Singapore, Malaysia, Thailand, Brunei, Indonesia, Hong Kong, Macau, Japan, China, Australia, Sri Lanka, Philippines, Netherlands, New Zealand, India, France, Sweden, Cambodia, Belgium, Portugal, Taiwan, United Kingdom and Vietnam
- Key people: Ting Seng Hee, Fabien Alexandre Reyjal
- Products: Sardines, mackerel, tuna, coconut, Asian sauces and pastes, fruits, vegetables, baked beans
- Owner: Ayam S.A.R.L.
- Number of employees: 1,000+
- Parent: Denis Frères Group of Companies
- Website: ayambrand.com

Ayam Brand (simply known as Ayam) is a multinational food company, specialising in prepared foods, including seafood, canned fish (sardines, mackerel, tuna) and canned vegetables, especially baked beans. Ayam's product offerings vary by country. The sole owner of Ayam Brand is a company called Ayam S.A.R.L.

== History ==
Alfred Clouët, a French citizen, founded Ayam Brand in 1892 in Singapore, which at that time was a part of British Malaya. The business focused on supplying food for colonial staff. They also produced building materials. At that historic era, the food brand was created to be a seal of quality, as canned food was then regarded as a luxury, inaccessible to the general public. Clouet used a rooster as the logo of the brand; it was a symbol of his home country. The brand name was generated by local traders and consumers, as they started referring to the canned sardines or salmon as Ayam Brand (ayam being the Malay word for 'chicken' or 'rooster').

In 1954, the company was taken over by the Denis Frères Group of Companies. The name of the founder can still be found in some distribution company names: A.Clouet & Co. (KL) Sdn. Bhd. For Malaysia, Clouet Trading Pte. Ltd. for Singapore or A. Clouet (Australia) Pty. Ltd. for Australia – New Zealand.

Active in Malaya in the 19th and first half of the 20th centuries, the brand expanded out of its historical boundaries after the 1950s. Ayam Brand is a brand leader in specific Asian markets such as Malaysia, Singapore, Brunei, Thailand, Indonesia and Hong Kong for mass market products such as sardines, tuna, coconut or baked beans, while it is centred around Asian cuisine in Australia, New Zealand, France, and the United Kingdom.
