= Commemorative medal for United Nations operations in Korea =

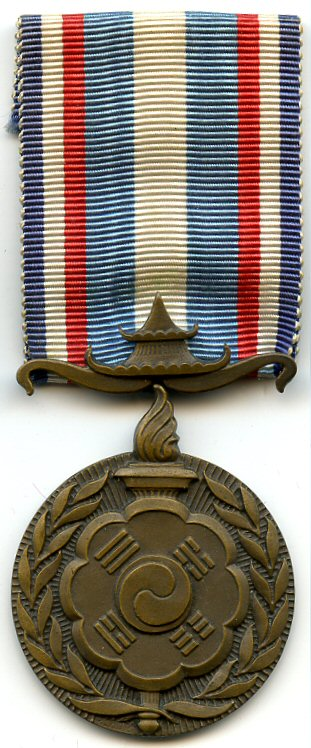
- Obverse of the medal
- Type: Commemorative Medal
- Awarded for: Two months military service in Korea
- Presented by: France
- Eligibility: French citizens and foreign nationals serving in the ranks of the French Foreign Legion
- Status: No longer awarded
- Established: January 8, 1952
- Ribbon of the United Nations operations in Korea commemorative medal

Precedence
- Next (higher): Commemorative medal for voluntary service in Free France
- Next (lower): 1943–1944 Italian campaign medal

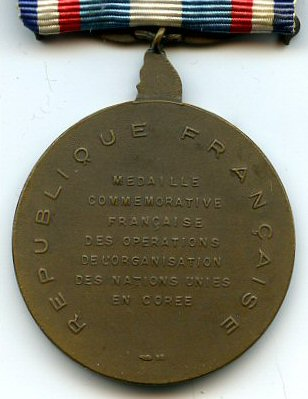
Reverse of the Korean Medal

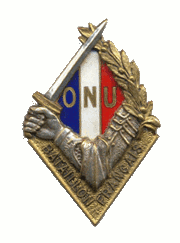
Insignia of the French Battalion in the Korean War

The Commemorative medal for United Nations operations in Korea (French: Médaille commémorative des opérations de l'ONU en Corée) was a French commemorative war medal established on 8 January 1952 by decree 52-34 for award to members of the French armed forces who fought in the Korean War.

On 25 June 1950, North Korean forces invaded South Korea in an effort to unify both countries under the northern communist government. A United Nations military force composed of seventeen nations under the command of American general Douglas MacArthur, soon began to arrive in theatre. France joined the U.N. forces in a 23 August decision, this force, composed of a battalion of 1,051 volunteers, both reservists and members of the regular force from the three services, set sail from Marseille on 25 October 1950. This battalion was under the command of general Raoul Magrin-Vernerey, who accepted a temporary demotion to lieutenant-colonel for the chance and honour to command this unit in Korea.

The French were thrown into the fight immediately upon arrival in theatre and particularly distinguished themselves at the battles of Wonju, Chipyong-ni and Heartbreak Ridge. Out of a total of 3,421 Frenchmen who fought in Korea, 262 were killed, 1008 were wounded and 7 remain unaccounted for. Even with its relatively small contribution in manpower due to the ongoing campaign in Indochina, the French government felt this small force had brilliantly served French interests in the eyes of the World and in the words of a press release "had resurrected the glory of Verdun and of the Marne".

== Award statute ==
The United Nations operations in Korea commemorative medal was awarded to soldiers of the French United Nations detachment in Korea and to naval personnel for a minimum of two months in theatre.

The two month in theatre minimum time period could be waived for members cited to the War Cross for foreign operational theaters (French: Croix de guerre des théâtres d'opérations extérieures) or for those evacuated due to wounds received during operations in theatre.

The medal could also be awarded to foreign nationals who served under French command. In this case, permission to award the medal was required from the soldier's country of origin through normal diplomatic channels.

Quite exceptionally, in line with the instructions contained in paragraph IV of the decree of 12 February 1952, this medal was bestowed freely with its accompanying certificate, at no cost to the recipients.

== Award description ==
The United Nations operations in Korea commemorative medal was a 36mm in diameter circular medal struck from bronze. Its obverse bore on a background of sun rays radiating out from its center, the relief image of the national emblem of the Republic of South Korea on a flower-like eight lobe geometric form superimposed over a lit torch with its flame extending 7mm over the medal's upper edge and forming the suspension loop. The torch also bisected a relief laurel wreath extending along all but the upper most of the medal's circumference. The straight ribbon mount was adorned with a bronze decoration resembling the top of a pagoda.

The medal's reverse bore the relief inscription on seven lines "MÉDAILLE" "COMMÉMORATIVE" "FRANÇAISE" "DES OPÉRATIONS" "DE L'ORGANISATION" "DES NATIONS UNIES" "EN CORÉE" (English: "FRENCH COMMEMORATIVE MEDAL OF THE OPERATIONS OF THE ORGANIZATION OF THE UNITED NATIONS IN KOREA") surrounded by the relief circular inscription "RÉPUBLIQUE FRANÇAISE" (English: "FRENCH REPUBLIC").

The medal hung from a 36mm wide silk moiré ribbon in the colours of the United Nations and France. It's multicoloured vertical stripes were disposed as follows beginning with three central equal width light blue, white and light blue stripes totalling 20mm, these were bordered by three equal width dark blue, white and red stripes totalling 8mm, the dark blue being closer the ribbon's edge.

== Noteworthy recipients ==
- General Raoul Magrin-Vernerey
- Lieutenant colonel Francois Borreill
- Lieutenant colonel de Germiny

== See also ==
- Korean War
- United Nations Command
- Korean Armistice Agreement
- French Battalion in the Korean War
