= Raphaël Onana =

Free French soldier of Cameroonian origin

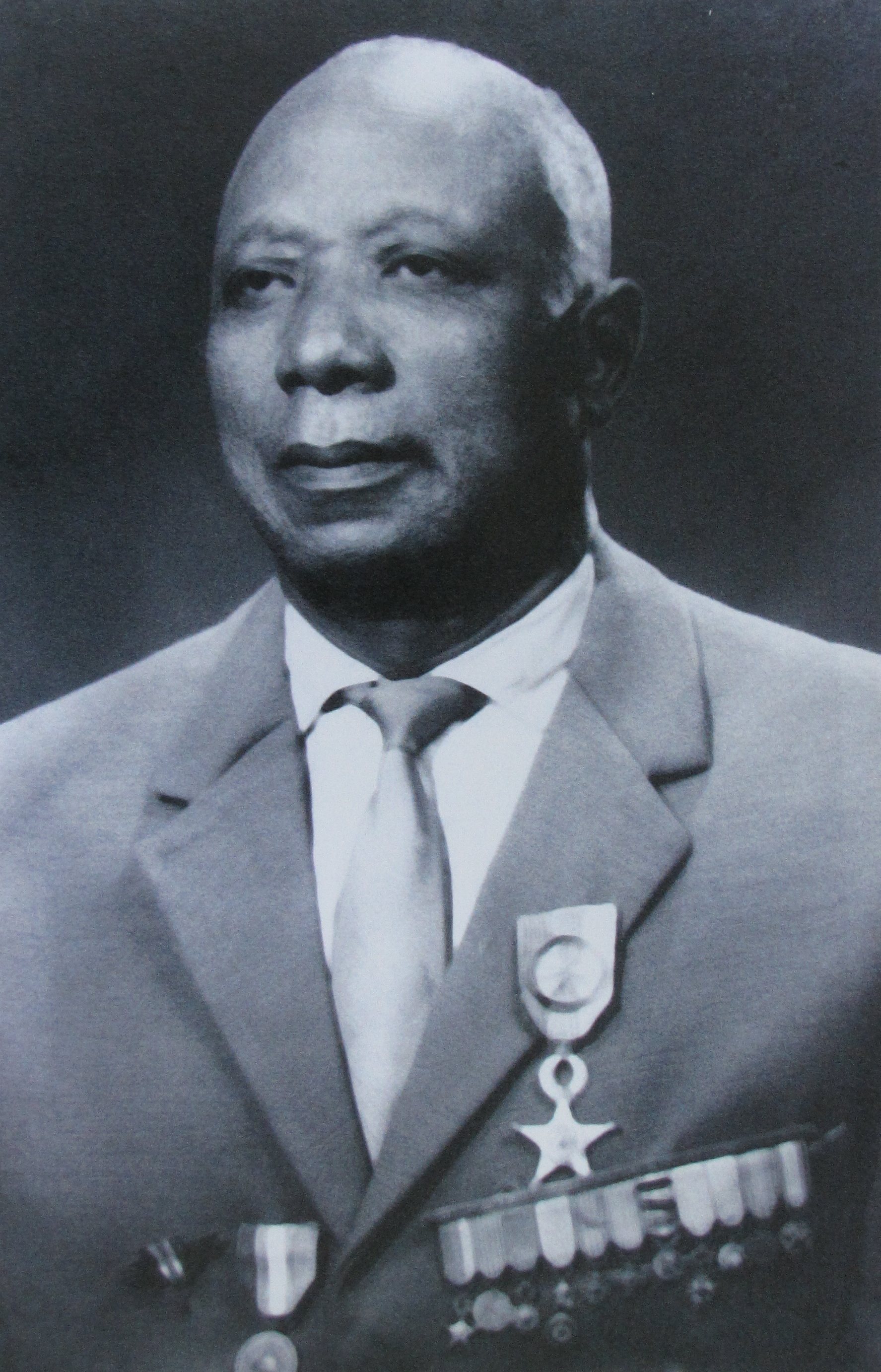
- Raphaël Onana
- Born: 14 July 1919; Poupouma at Nkol Okala, Cameroon
- Died: 11 November 2002 (aged 83); Yaounde, Cameroon
- Military career
- Allegiance: French Third Republic; Free French Forces
- Branch: French Army
- Service years: 1940–1944
- Rank: Staff sergeant (French military rank)
- Nickname: Méyang Mé Tso'o
- Conflicts: World War II
- Awards: Legion of Honour; Médaille militaire; Croix de Guerre 1939–1945; Ordre national du Mérite by the President of France; Insigne des blessés militaires
- Other work: Hadfield-Spears Ambulance Unit

Raphaël Onana, born on 14 July 1919, was a Free French soldier of Cameroonian origin, naturalised French. He was born at Poupouma, in Nkol Okala a village in the Province du Centre to the north-west of Yaoundé, the capital of Cameroon, and died 11 November 2002, at Yaounde,

On 17 June 1939, he enlisted voluntarily as a sergeant in the Cameroon militia, due to his imposing stature (1.88m) and his strategic skills, to the 1er régiment de tirailleurs du Cameroun (First Regiment of Cameroon Rifles); and later as a staff sergeant in the Hadfield-Spears Ambulance Unit. After the war, he married in the Christian tradition Rita Essah Tsimi, with whom he had ten children (Casmile, Jeanne, Etienne, Agrippine Awoundza, Lazare Ekongo, Métila Françoise, Essah Nathalie, Zobo Ostomac, Akamba Marie-Solange, and Nsing Marius Patrice). He was made a French citizen in 1951 by President Charles de Gaulle.

== World War II ==
At the outbreak of World War II the militia of Cameroon for the most part joined the Free French forces, led by Captain (later Colonel then General) Philippe Leclerc de Hauteclocque. As such, Raphaël Onana was involved in the Gabon Campaign in November 1940, and the Syria–Lebanon Campaign from June to December 1941. The rifles of the Raphaël Onana's regiment were models MAS-36.

Cameroon rallied to Free France in July 1940, as did the majority of educated Cameroonians, but some German-speaking Cameroonians were arrested and convicted of spying for Nazi Germany. On 28 December 1941, Onana was deployed to the desert. Thus he became a companion in arms of veterans of the Battle of Bir Hakeim, which held back Erwin Rommel, after which Charles de Gaulle declared that they had been "the pride of France".

It was at Bir Hakeim that Raphaël Onana was seriously injured by several 9×19mm Parabellum rounds from an MP 40 submachine gun during the night of 10 June 1942 and was taken prisoner. Deported to Italy, he was exchanged as a prisoner of war in November 1942. Repatriated, he received final discharge in April 1943, because of his war injury, amputating his left leg.

In 1945 French Cameroon became a country under supervision of the United Nations, which had replaced the League of Nations. Then it became in 1946 an "associated territory" of the French Union. Despite the exceptional courage of Raphaël Onana, he could never become a warrant officer, because of the colour of his skin. The Free French Forces hesitated to promote a black Central African from non-commissioned officer to sergeant major.

== After the war ==
Raphael Onana had supported the "Union fraternelle des anciens combattants d'expression Française africains et malgaches" (UFACEFAM) (tr: Fraternal Union of French-speaking Veterans of Africa and Madagascar) along with the Ambassador of France in Cameroon. He had been elected president of "l'Amicale des anciens Combattants du Cameroun" (tr: the Cameroon Association of Veterans) and was assisted by Doctor Simon Pierre Tchoungui, who was later a prime minister of Cameroon.

Raphael Onana was invited to the Élysée Palace by President Charles de Gaulle in December 1962. There he was decorated with the National Order of the Legion of Honor and many other awards.

Raphael Onana had been in combat with a famous soldier: Simon Bikié Noah, the grandfather of Yannick Noah, the winner of the 1983 French Open of international tennis. He knew him as a comrade-in-arms despite 20 years of age difference. Raphaël remembered having shared with him the experiences of command because Simon had the motivations of the tribal chief. When Raphaël had learned the death of his former colleague Simon Noah, who was killed by a Cameroonian soldier during the 1985 coup d'état in Cameroon, under the influence of the coups in Mauritania, Guinea and Sudan, he strongly protested the curfew ordered by the Cameroonian putsch. He immediately contacted Simon Pierre Tchoungui (the ex-Prime Minister of Cameroon) to make him familiar with the changes to the arrests by the putsch to secure his family and friends.

Before the Independence of Cameroon on 1 January 1960, Raphael Onana was a judge in the French courts.

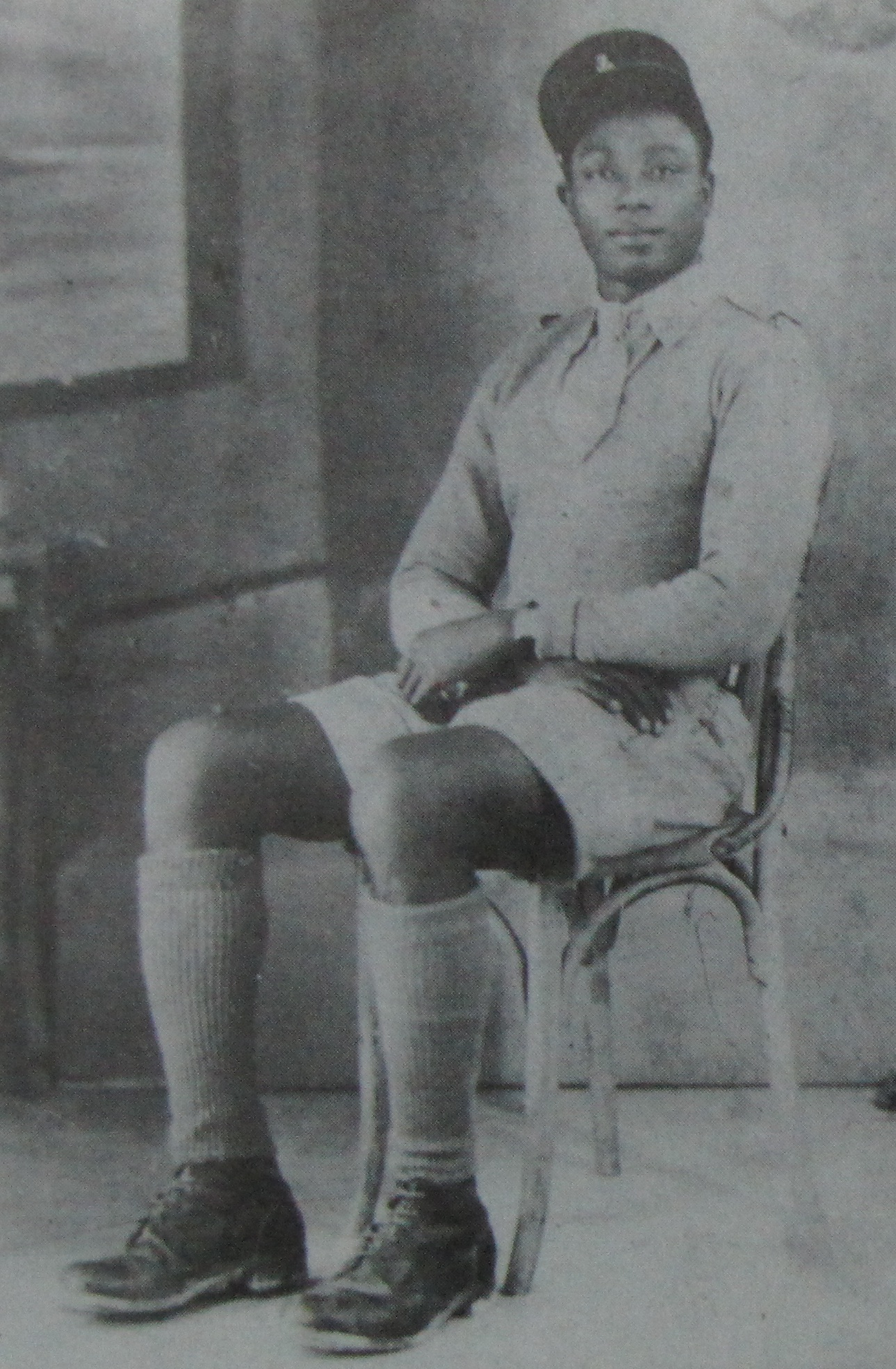
Raphaël Onana in the Military uniform of the Free French Forces.

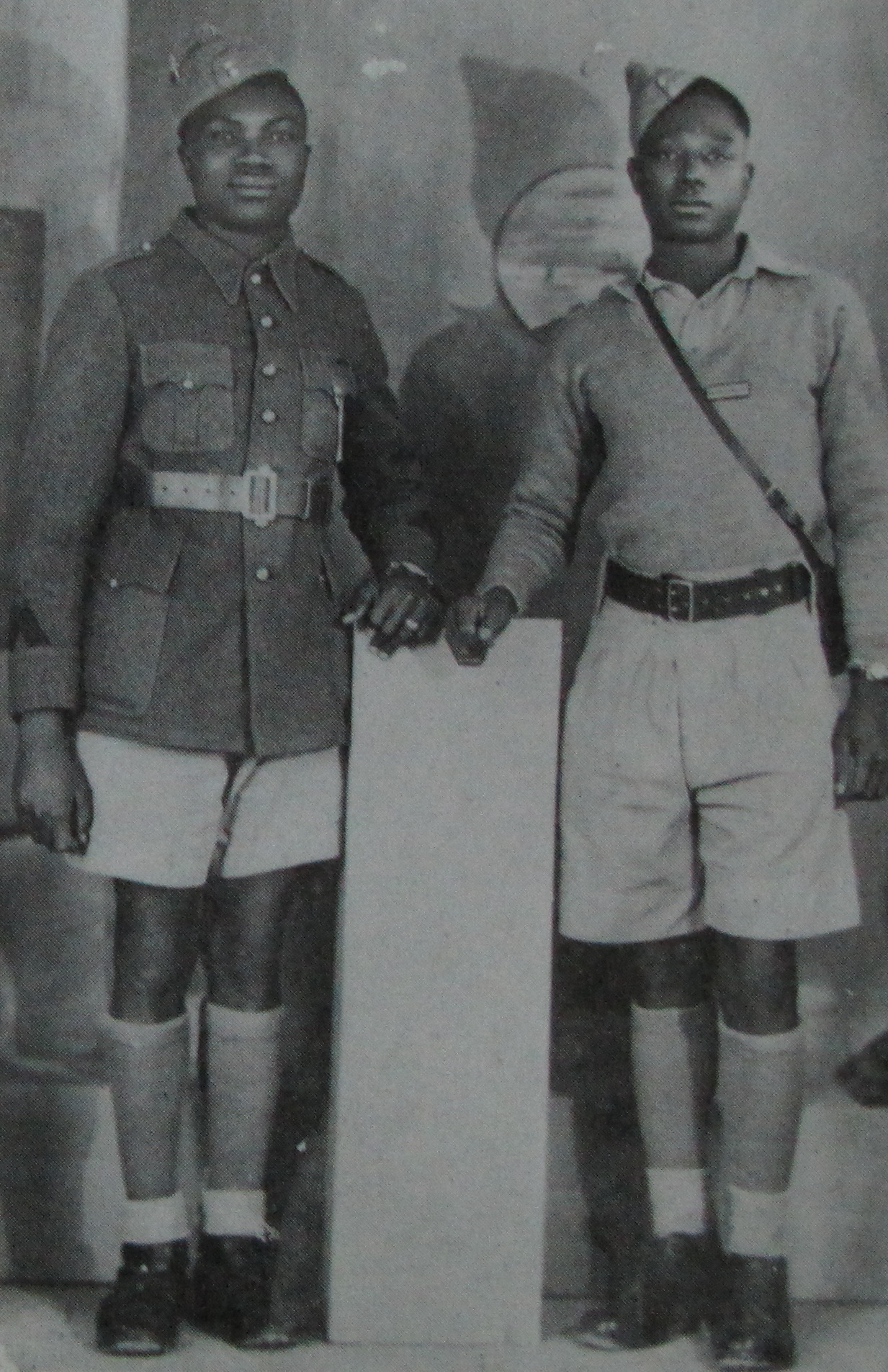
Raphaël Onana, on the right, a young militiaman at 20 years age, with his comrade.

== His father, Ékongo Akon'Awana ==
From the age of 3 years, Raphaël Onana spent his youth with much frustration caused by the loss of his father Ékongo Akon'Awana, who died at 33 years old. Local peasants held that he had been poisoned by sorcerers. He was raised by his mother Regina Awundza, who was a Béti and spoke an Éton dialect. He had two sisters, the eldest, Zobo, born in 1910, and the youngest, Ng'Onana, born in 1922. Between 1910 and 1919, there were four other children born, all boys, who consecutively died by way of disease.

Ékongo Akon'Awana was a Bakassa warrior with an uncommon physical strength, courageous, dangerous, clever, cruel and bloodthirsty. Villagers near Poupouma had dishonoured his second wife and widow, Regina Awundza, and her children. His first wife, Métil, had a daughter, half-sister of Raphaël, Johanna Ngazomo Métila. Ékongo Akon'Awana felt himself unfortunate as not to have a male heir despite his polygamy and his prayers for Zamba Ntond'Obé, a pagan god that resembled the primordial deities Gaia or the mother goddess in Europe.

Ékongo is a word of dialect which can mean lance or javelin, a symbol of the warrior during tribal wars. He was a pious pagan animist. Édounga Zoa, the Cameroonian sorcerer, told him that he had been cursed not to have a son because of his crimes to defend his territory of Poupouma. When Regina Awundza was pregnant, Ékongo Akon'Awana had given his agreement to the wizard Édounga Zoa, by his incantations, to have a son of irreproachable health. This had a special condition: stop killing passers-by.

In this way, the sorcerer Édounga Zoa had declared, after finishing his incantations, "Regina Awundza, currently pregnant, would soon bring into the world a boy. He would never die, as his four elder brothers had. Instead, he will live very long time, have abundant offspring and experience glory...." This explains the word "sheltered" in the title of his work.

== The Onana family name ==
In Cameroon, it is customary to take a name of someone else you love. Raphaël Onana had chosen to take the name of his younger sister, Ng'Onana, born in 1922, instead of taking the name his father Akon'Awana who had a bad reputation because of his crimes on Poupouma. Raphaël Onana wished to turn the page and make the villagers around Poupouma forget their anger.

== Work ==
- Un homme blindé à Bir-Hakeim: récit d'un sous-officier camerounais qui a fait la guerre de 39–45 [A sheltered man at Bir-Hakeim: account of a Cameroonian non-commissioned officer in the war of 39–45], Paris: Editions L'Harmattan, 1996, p 272. ISBN 2-7384-4239-0

== Quotation ==
Raphaël Onana told Charles de Gaulle before the presentation of medals at the Élysée Palace in December 1962:

" When one has only one leg, it must be worth two! When one does not hear, the eyes must be worth four! "

== Awards ==
- Médaille militaire
- Croix de guerre 1939-1945, with Croix de guerre des théâtres d'opérations extérieures, by the General officer de Gaulle on 2 June 1943.
- Insigne des blessés militaires
- Médaille commémorative des services volontaires dans la France libre
- Médaille commémorative de la guerre 1939–1945
- Ordre national du Mérite by the President of France on 21 December 1962.
- Chevalier de la Légion d'honneur
- Officier de l'Ordre national du Cameroun

== Works ==
- Raphaël Onana; Patrice Etoundi-M'Balla (1996). Un homme blindé à Bir-Hakeim: récit d'un sous-officier camerounais qui a fait la guerre de 39–45 (in French). L'Harmattan. ISBN 2-7384-4239-0. OCLC 609338592.
