= Joseph Bastiani =

Singaporean businessman

Joseph Pierre Bastiani (1843 — 25 November 1924) was a pioneer of the pineapple trade in Singapore, as well as the founder of a cannery on the island.

== Early life ==
Bastiani was born in Corsica. He left Corsica at the age of 16 and spent the next few years employed at vineyards in Bordeaux, Burgundy and the Loire Valley. He enlisted in the French Army during the Franco-Prussian War and was awarded a gold medal for his service.

== Career ==
After the war, he began working for Messageries Maritimes as a sailor. During his time as a sailor, he met writer Joseph Conrad, who recommended that he move to Singapore. He left the company and moved to Singapore in 1874, where he and his brother established a pineapple cannery. In 1880, he exhibited four of his products at the Melbourne International Exhibition. In 1882, he and his brother began selling imported products in their shops on High Street. They soon began branching out into confectionaries and cakes, as well as the import of construction materials. In 1892, Bastiani handed ownership of the business over to his brother-in-law Joseph Cardella and retired to Nice, where he established a canned fruit factory.

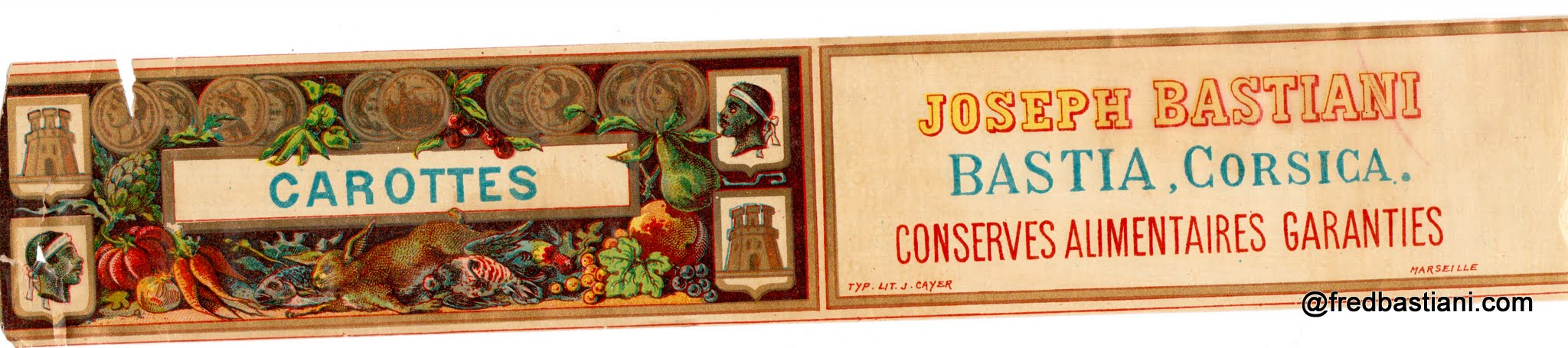
Etiquette boite de conserve carottes

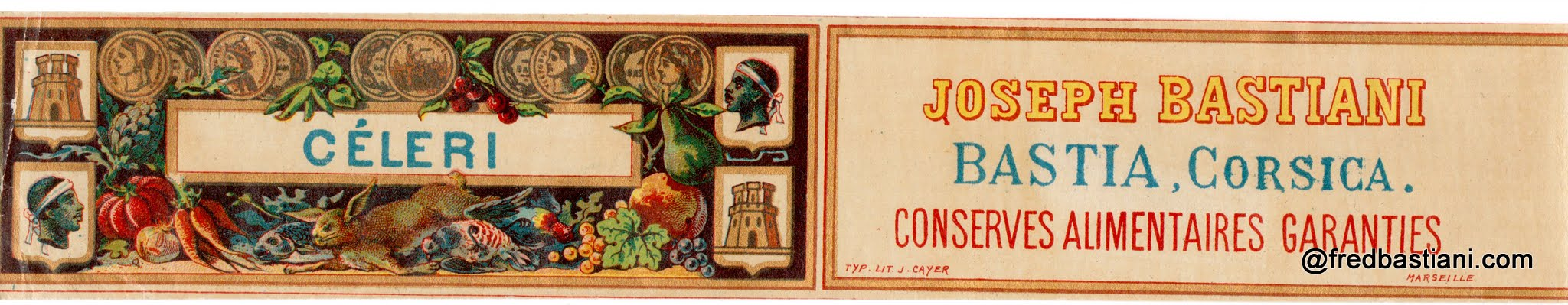
Etiquette boite de conserve celeri

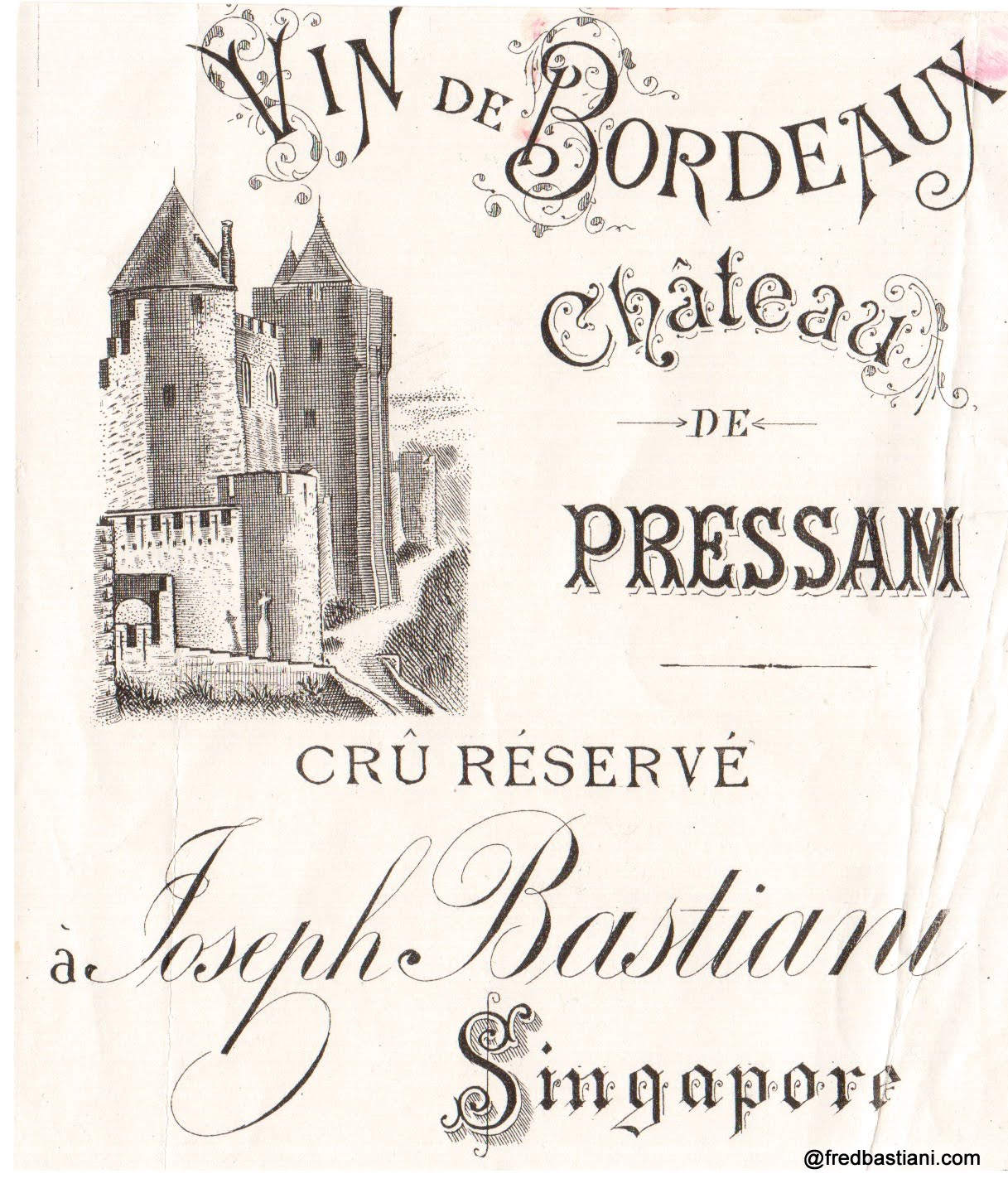
Etiquette bouteille de vin

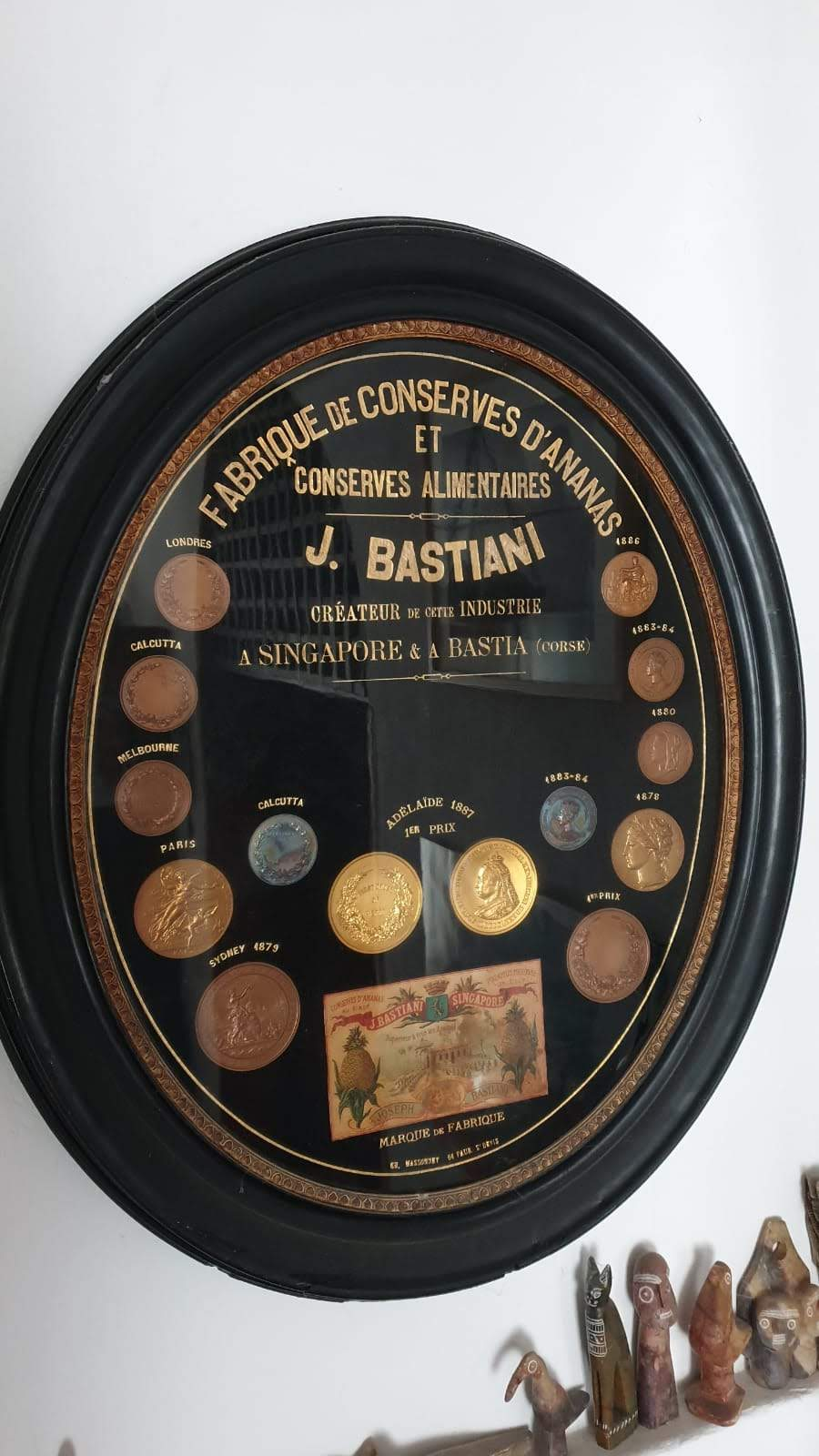
Tableau de médailles

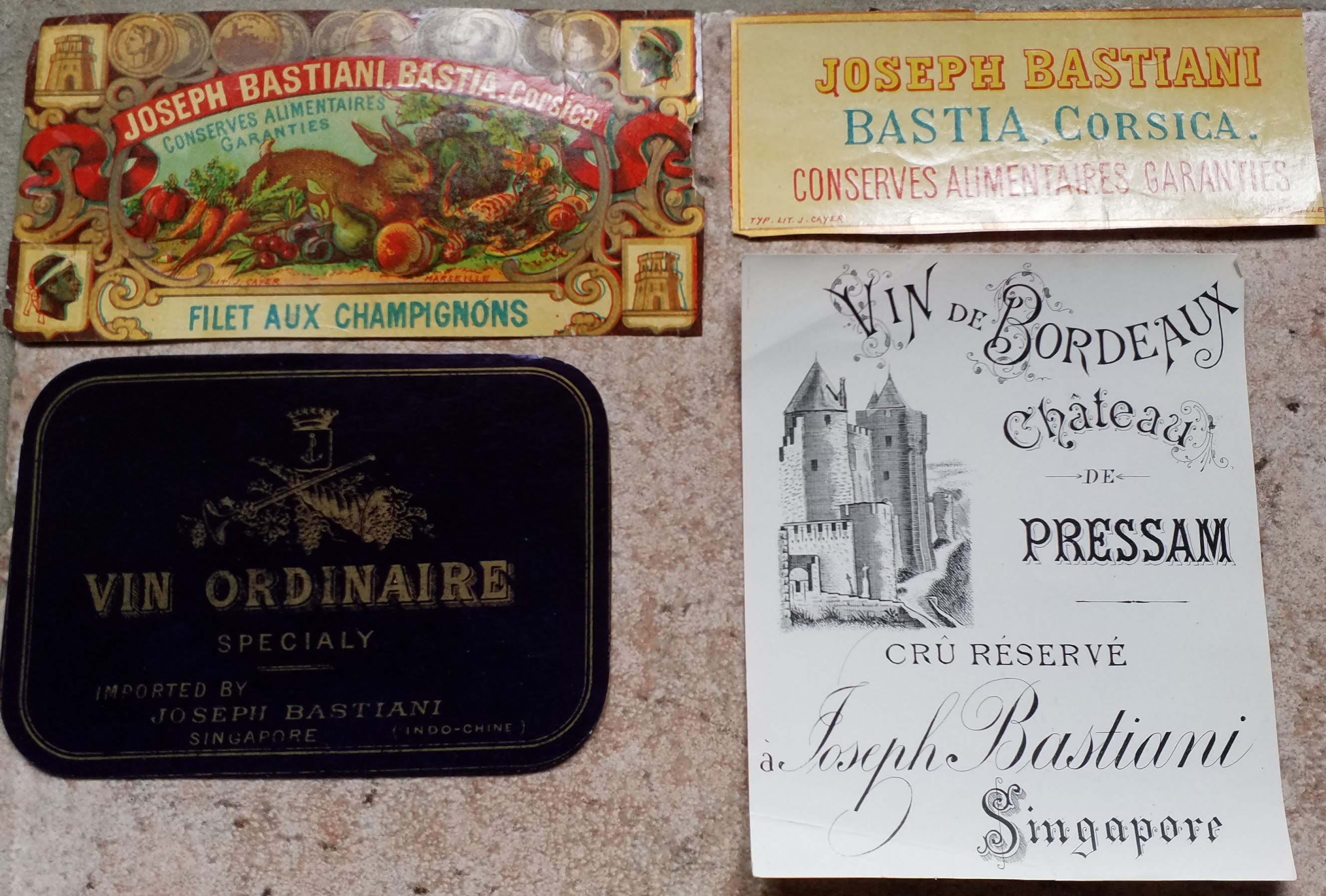
Étiquettes Conserves

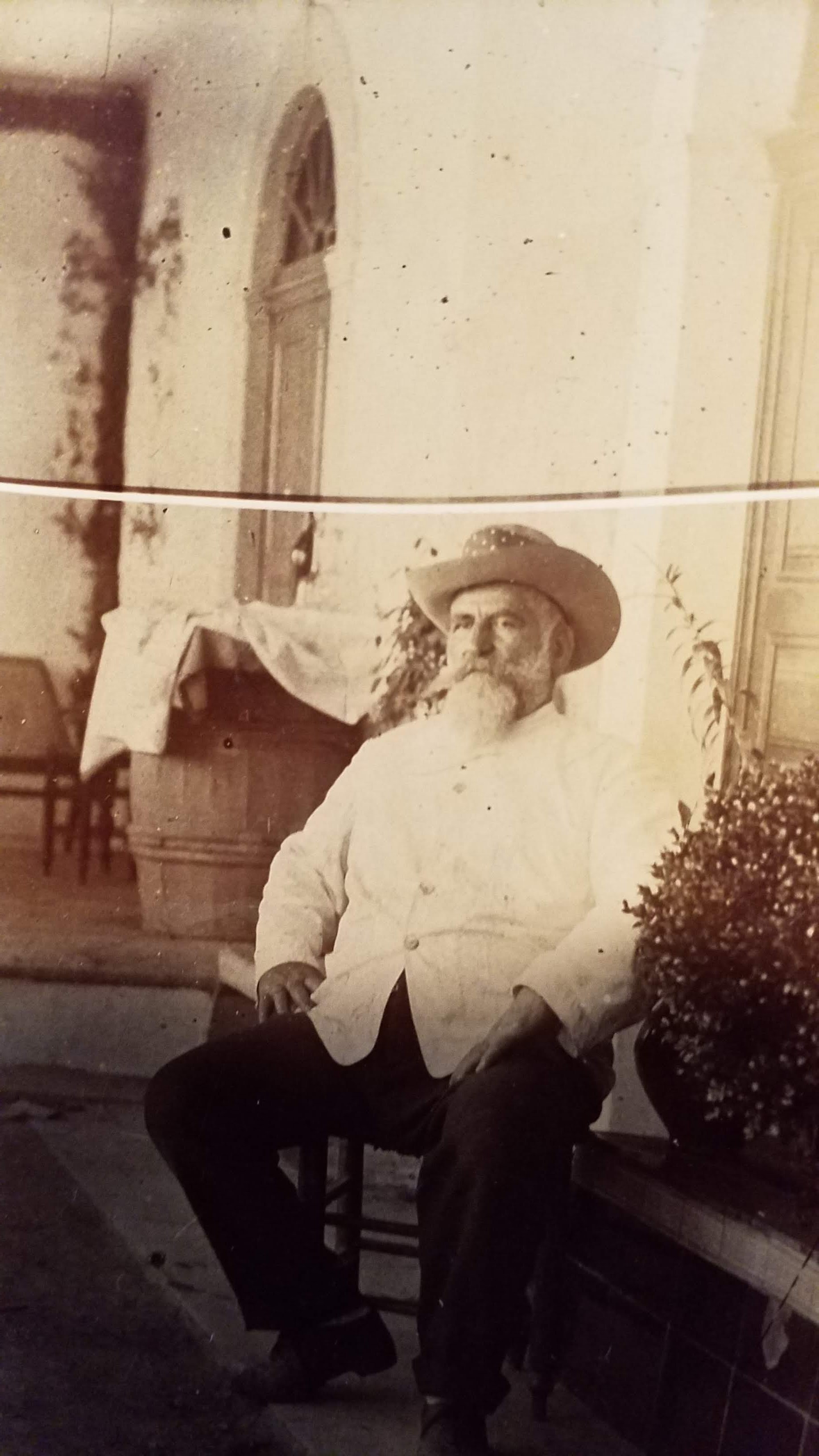
Joseph Bastiani

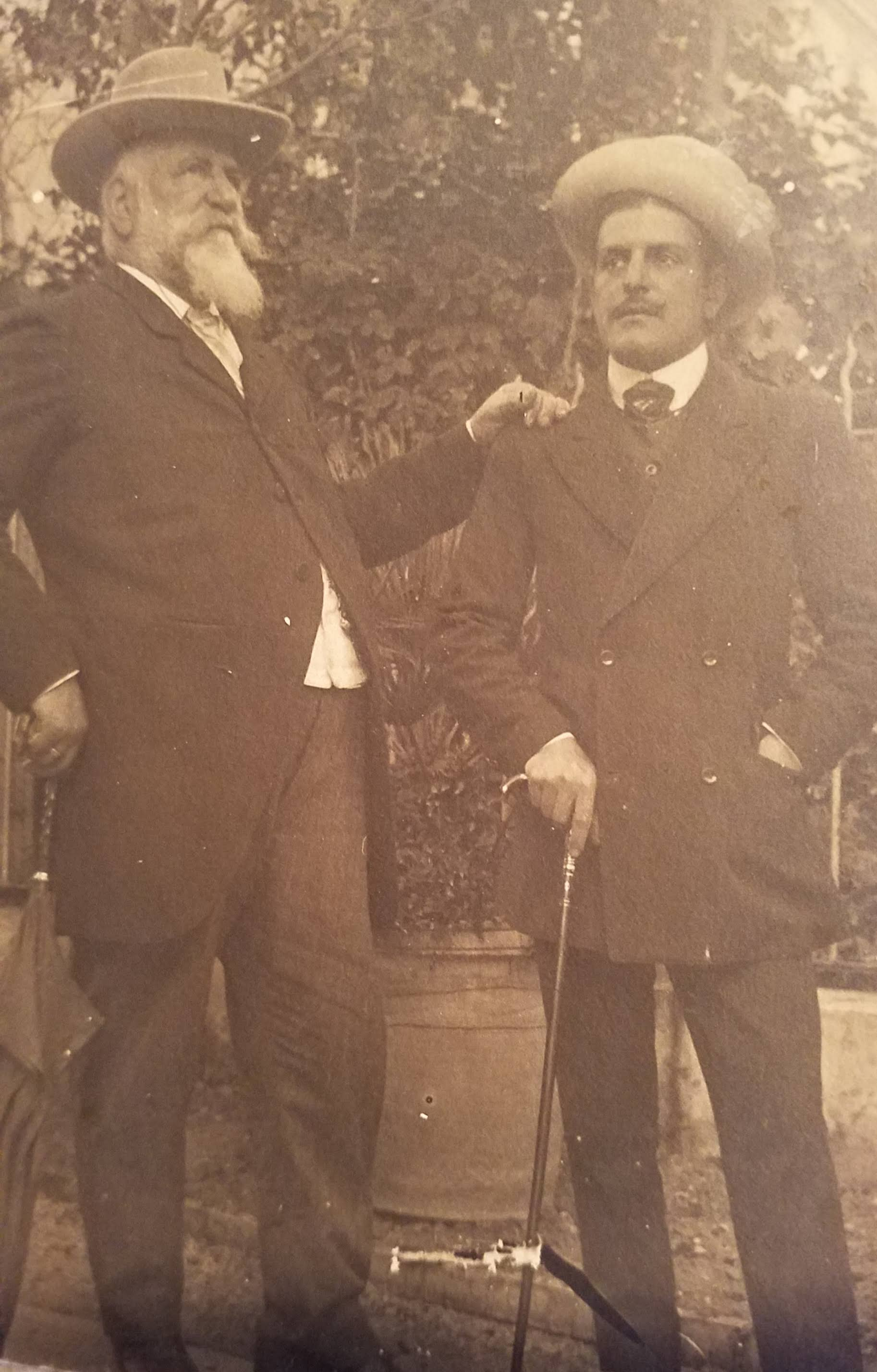
Joseph Bastiani

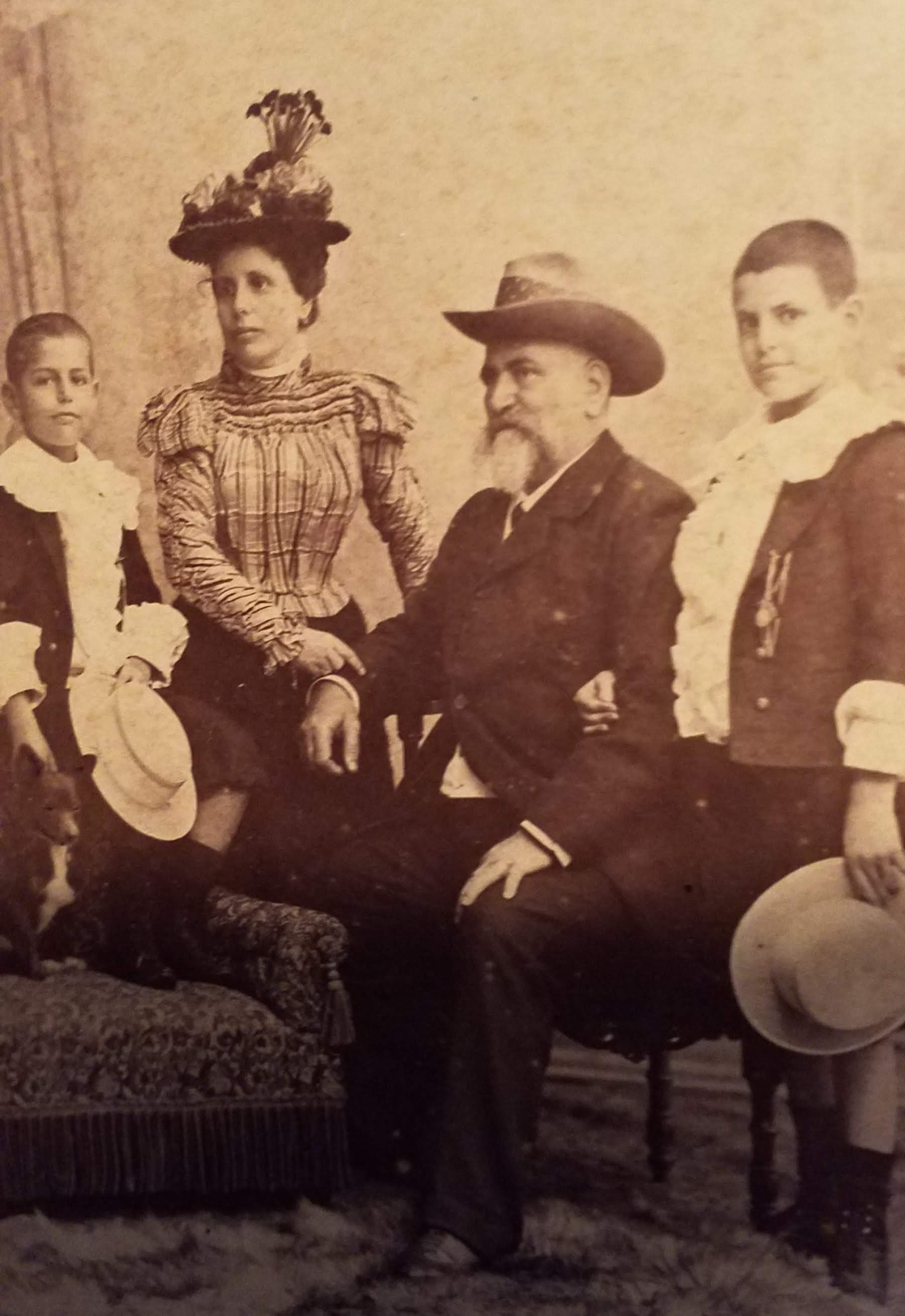
Joseph Bastiani

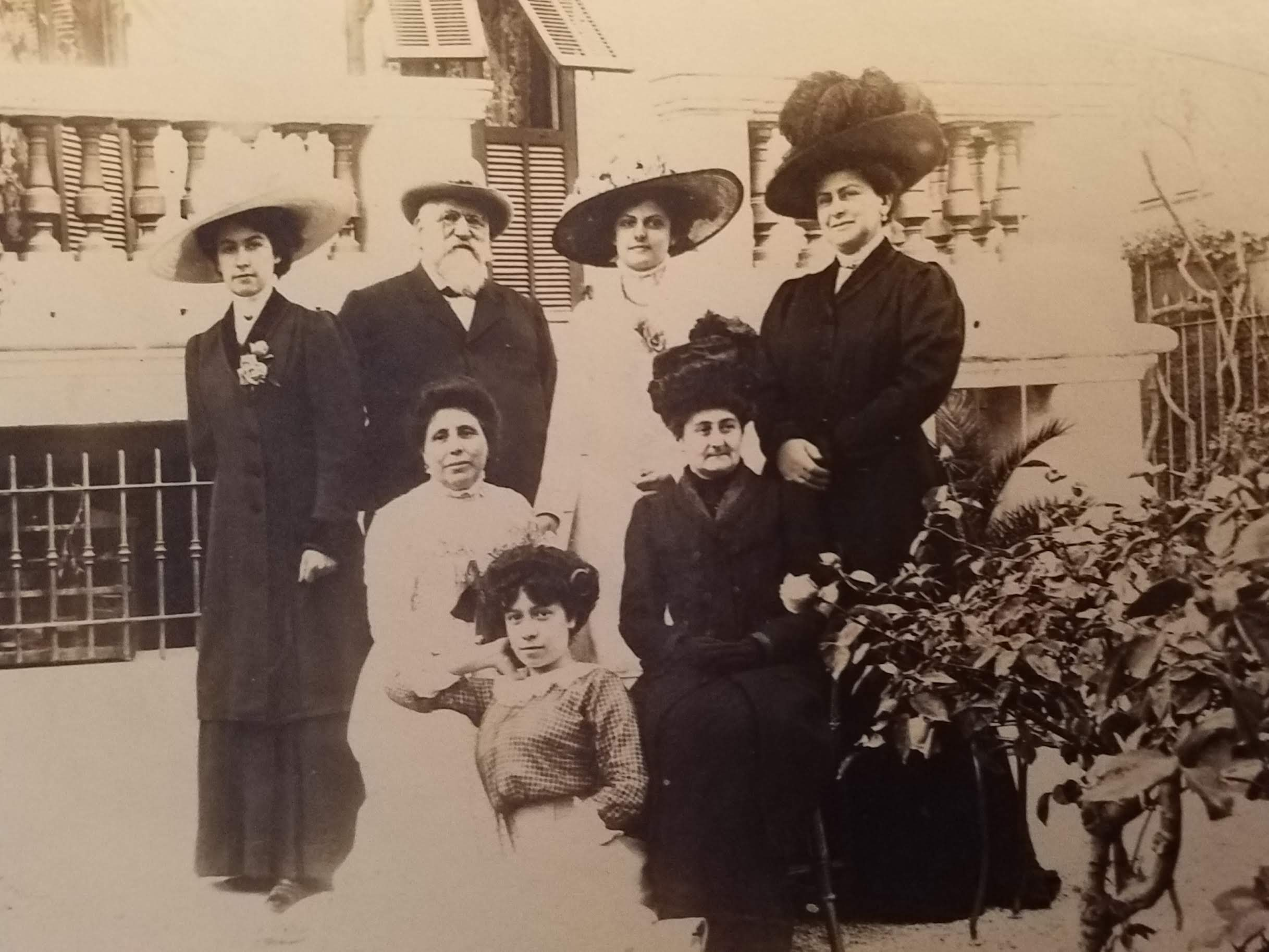
Joseph Bastiani

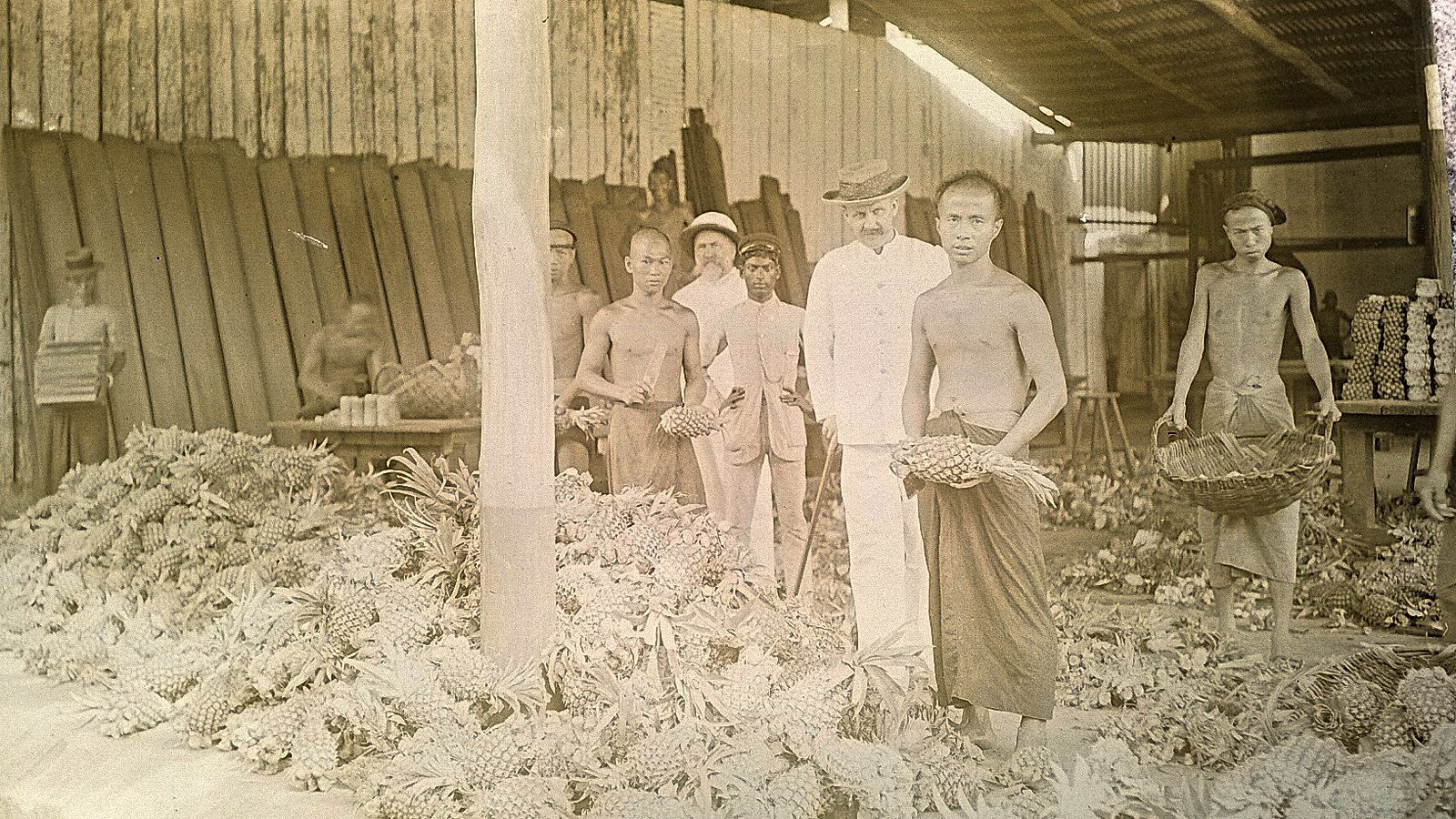
Joseph Bastiani

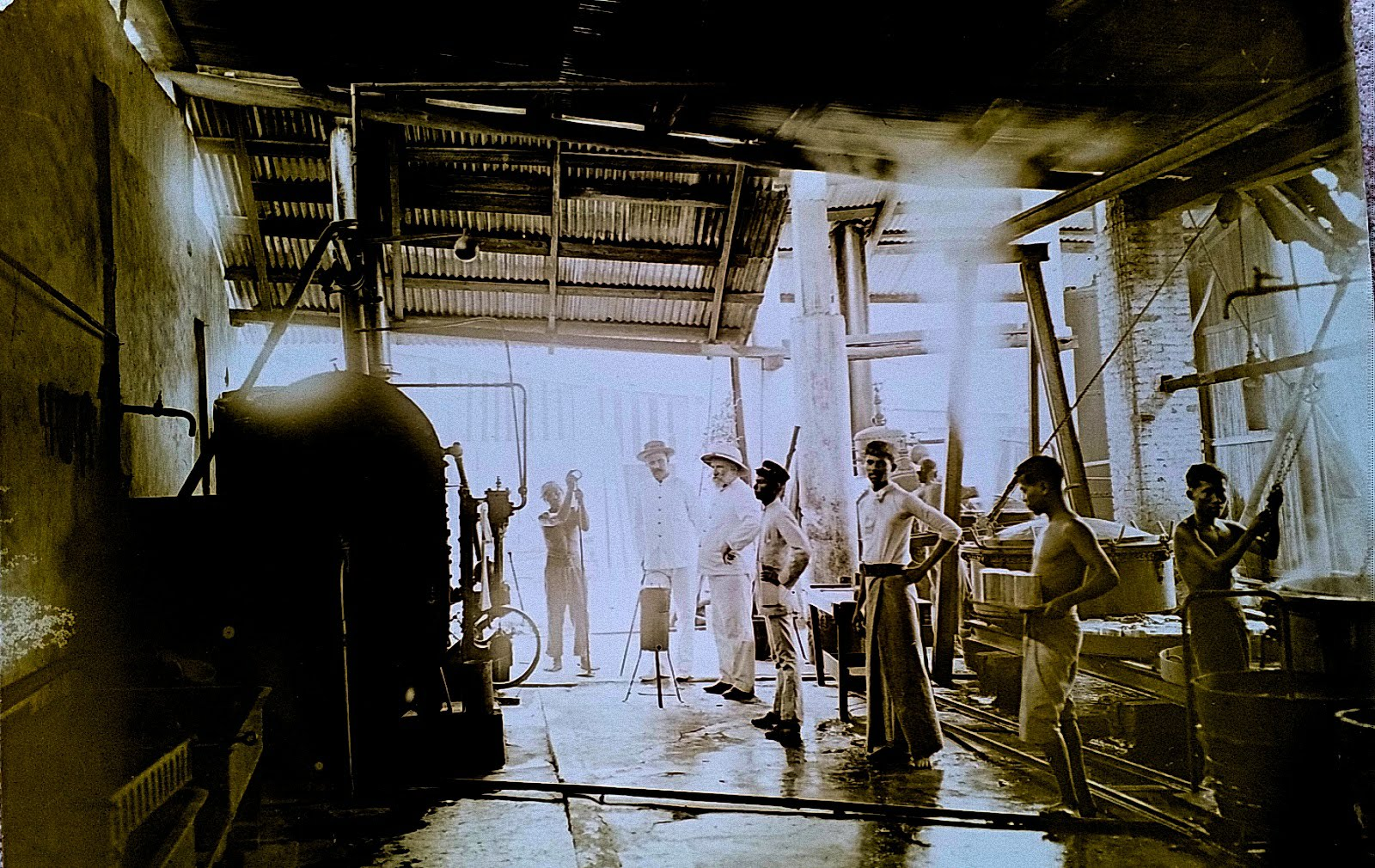
Joseph Bastiani

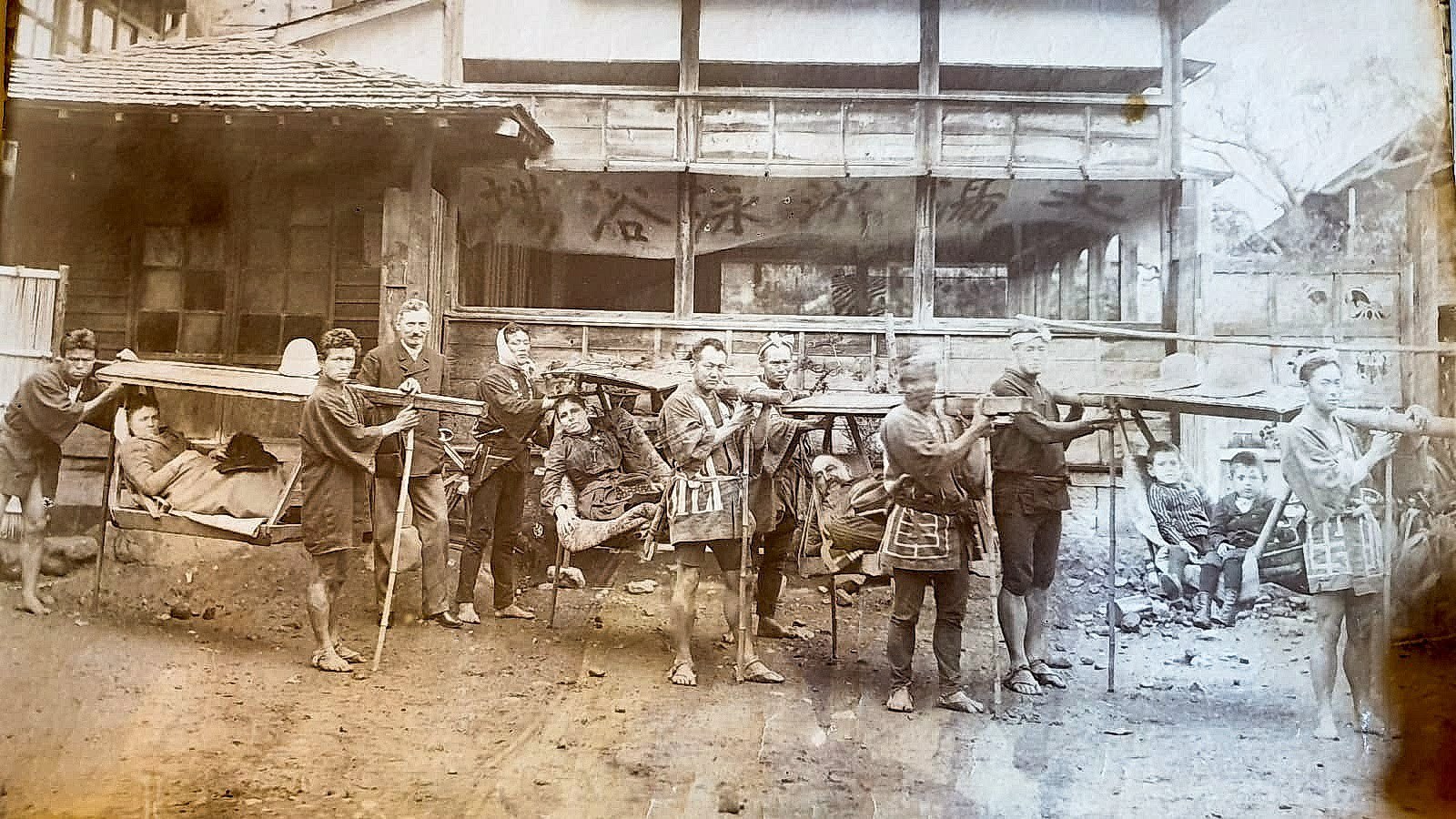
Joseph Bastiani

Cardella did not manage the business well and sold off some of the cannery's canning machines to a rival company, which began manufacturing boxes with Bastiani's stickers. Bastiani then returned to Singapore to retake ownership of the company. However, he sold his pineapple cannery in Summer 1900, and his entire business in 1902, after which he returned to Nice.

== Personal life and death ==
Bastiani was married and had two sons.

He died in Nice on 25 November 1924.
