= 1939–1945 Commemorative war medal (France) =

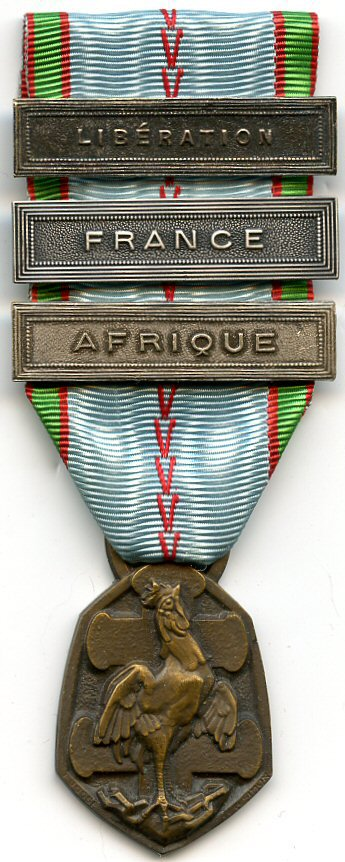
- 1939–1945 Commemorative war medal with clasps "LIBERATION", "FRANCE" and "AFRIQUE"
- Type: Commemorative Medal
- Awarded for: Military service against the AXIS
- Presented by: France
- Eligibility: French citizens and foreign nationals serving in the ranks of the French Foreign Legion
- Status: No longer awarded
- Established: May 21, 1946
- Ribbon of the 1939–1945 Commemorative war medal

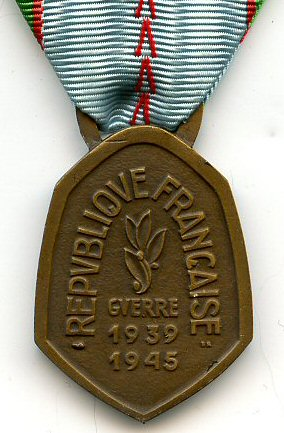
Reverse of the medal

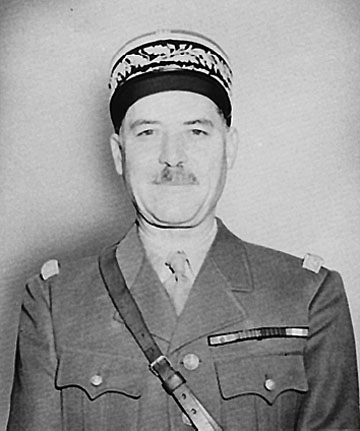
General Alphonse Juin, a recipient of the 1939–1945 Commemorative war medal

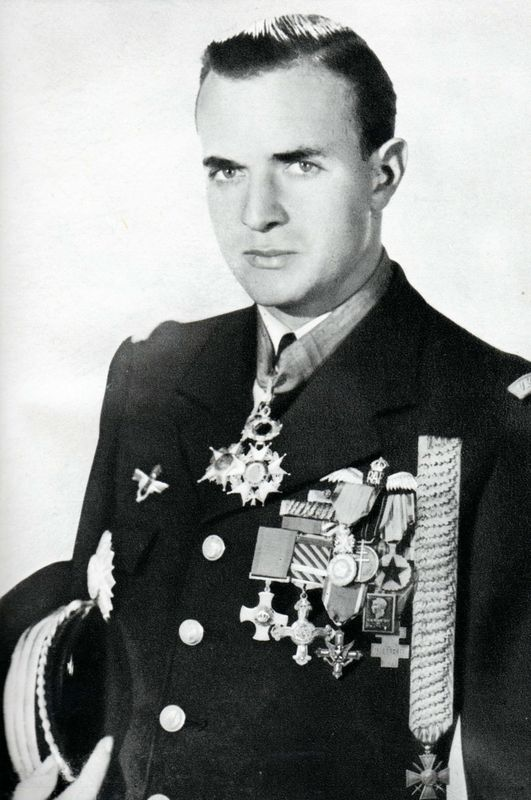
French fighter ace Pierre Clostermann, a recipient of the 1939–1945 Commemorative war medal

The 1939–1945 Commemorative war medal (French: "Médaille commémorative de la guerre 1939–1945") is a commemorative medal of France established on 21 May 1946 to recognize individual participation in the Second World War.

== Award Statute ==
The 1939–1945 Commemorative war medal was awarded to all soldiers serving under French authority or under a French government in a state of war against the Axis nations, or present on board a warship or armed merchant vessel under these same authorities and/or governments; to French citizens, whether military or civilian, who fought against the Axis forces or their representatives; to foreign military who served as Frenchmen in formations at war against the Axis forces.

A 1949 decree further added the members of the French passive resistance as potential recipients of the 1939–1945 Commemorative war medal.

== Award description ==
The 1939–1945 commemorative war medal is hexagonal and struck from bronze. It is 28mm at its widest and 38mm high excluding the suspension loop. The obverse bears the relief image of a rooster superimposed in front of a Cross of Lorraine, its wings spread out and standing on a broken chain. The reverse bears the relief semi-circular inscription "RÉPUBLIQUE FRANÇAISE" (English: "FRENCH REPUBLIC") over a sprig of laurel leaves and the inscription on three lines "GUERRE" "1939" "1945" (English: "WAR" "1939" "1945").

The medal hangs from a ribbon passing through the medal's built-in suspension loop. This silk moiré ribbon is 36mm wide and light blue with 3mm green stripes bordered in 1mm red at its edges, at its centre a vertical series of red "V" letters denoting "Victory".

Twelve operational theatre clasps can be worn on the ribbon:

- FRANCE (English: FRANCE) for operations between 3 September 1939 and 25 June 1940;
- NORVÈGE (English: NORWAY) for operations between 12 April 1940 and 17 June 1940;
- AFRIQUE (English: AFRICA) for operations between 25 June 1940 and 13 May 1943;
- LIBÉRATION (English: LIBERATION) for operations in Corsica or in the French Campaign between 25 June 1940 and 8 May 1945;
- ALLEMAGNE (English: GERMANY) for operations between 14 September 1944 and 8 May 1945;
- EXTRÊME-ORIENT (English: FAR EAST) for operations (including in the Indian and Pacific oceans) between 7 December 1941 and 15 August 1945;
- GRANDE-BRETAGNE (English: GREAT BRITAIN) for operations between 25 June 1940 and 8 May 1945;
- URSS (English: USSR) for operations in the Normandie-Niemen fighter wing between 28 November 1942 and 8 May 1945;
- ATLANTIQUE (English: ATLANTIC) for naval operations between 3 September 1939 and 8 May 1945;
- MANCHE (English: ENGLISH CHANNEL) for naval operations between 3 September 1939 and 8 May 1945;
- MER DU NORD (English: NORTH SEA) for naval operations between 3 September 1939 and 8 May 1945;
- MÉDITERRANÉE (English: MEDITERRANEAN) for naval operations between 3 September 1939 and 8 May 1945.

The clasp "ITALIE" (English: ITALY) was repealed in 1953 following the establishment of the 1943-1944 Italian campaign medal.

Seven other clasps bearing the years "1939", "1940", "1941", "1942", "1943", "1944" and "1945" were available when the deed to commemorate took part outside the theatre and/or dates cited above.

Two further clasps were authorised for wear on the 1939–1945 commemorative war medal:

- DÉFENSE PASSIVE (English: PASSIVE DEFENCE) for those receiving an invalid's pension following injury from work aimed at the protection of the civilian population (decree of 2 August 1949).
- ENGAGÉ VOLONTAIRE (English: VOLUNTEER ENLISTEE) for those able to prove they voluntarily enlisted for service in the 1939-1945 war.

== Noteworthy recipients (partial list) ==
- General Philippe Leclerc de Hauteclocque
- General Marie-Pierre Kœnig
- French resistance heroine Andrée Peel
- French resistance hero Jean Moulin
- General Alphonse Juin
- General Charles de Gaulle
- General Henri Giraud
- Colonel Peter J. Ortiz, USMCR
- Fighter ace Pierre Clostermann
- Private Stanley Chiasson (sniper) Royal 22e Regiment

== See also ==
- Battle of France
- Free French Forces
- Free French Naval Forces
- Free French Air Force
- Western Front
