= Gallic rooster =

National symbol of France

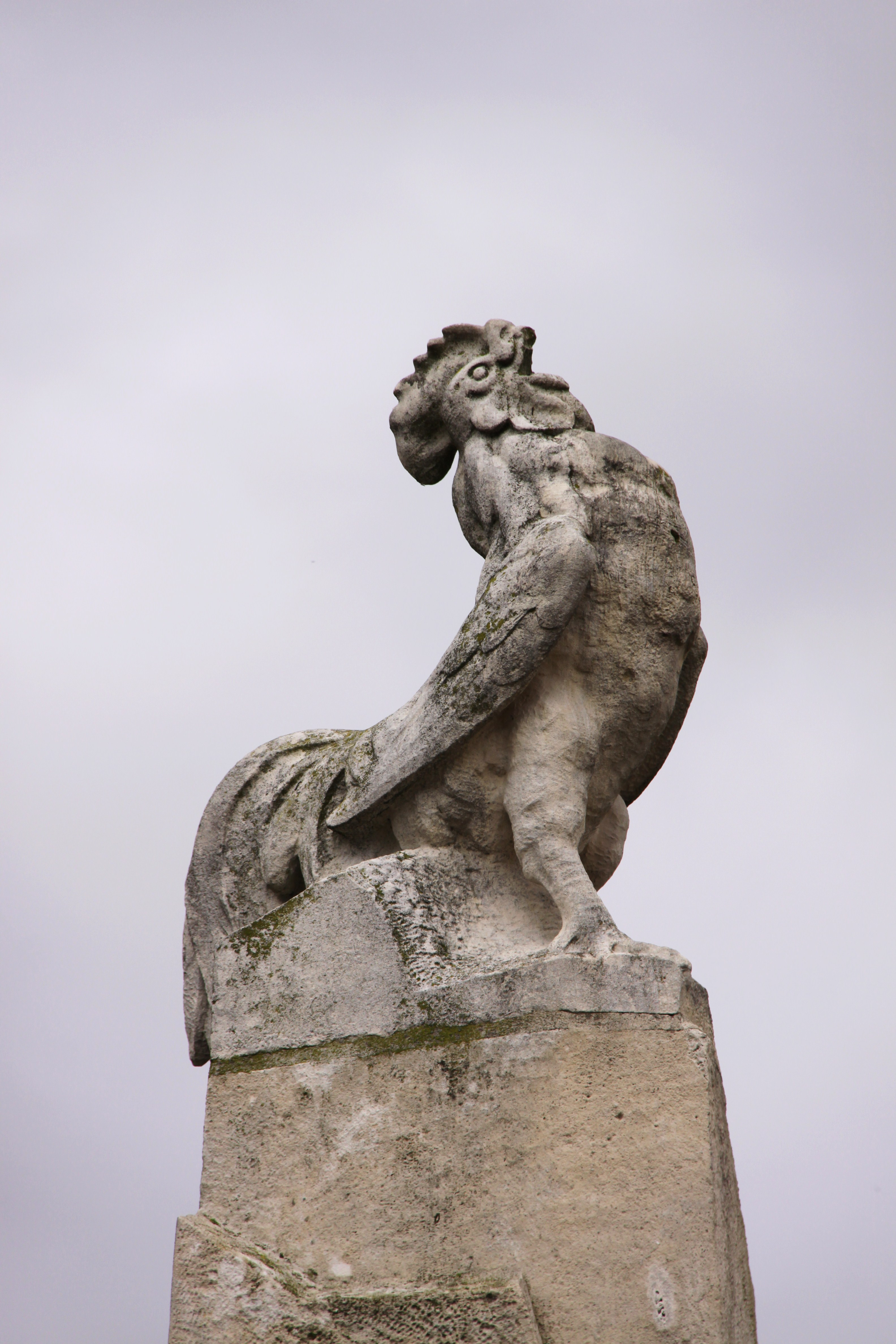
Gallic rooster on top of a war memorial in La Rochelle

The Gallic rooster (French: coq gaulois, pronounced [kɔk ɡolwa]) is a national symbol of the French people as a nation, as opposed to Marianne representing France as a state and its values: the Republic.

A rooster, in a different pose, is also used as the symbol of the Wallonia and the French Community of Belgium.

== Origination ==
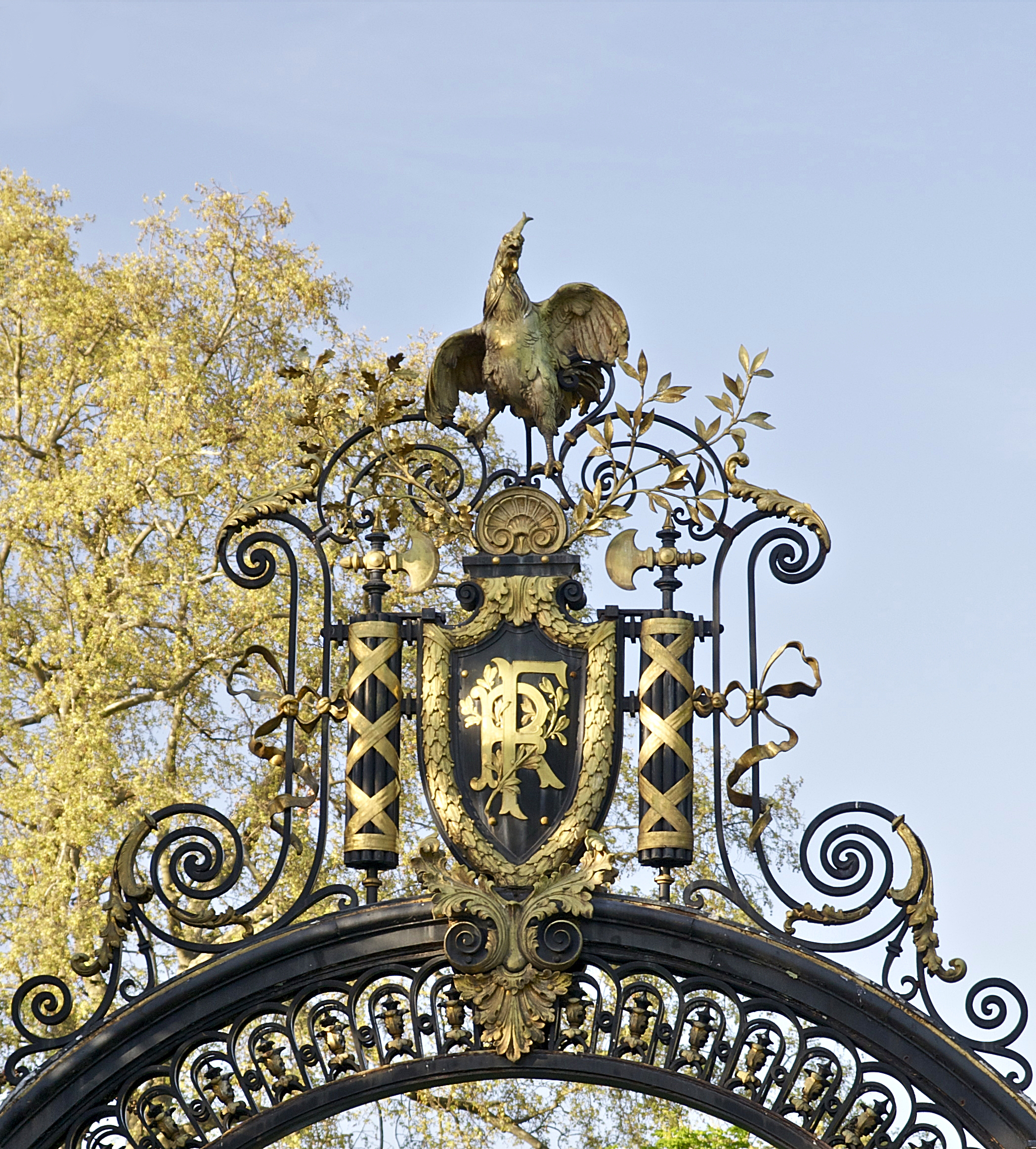
Gallic rooster on the garden gate of the Élysée Palace in Paris, the official residence of the President of the French Republic.

During the times of Ancient Rome, Suetonius, in The Twelve Caesars, noticed that, in Latin, rooster (gallus) and Galli (Gallus) were homonyms.

Its association with France dates back from the Middle Ages and is due to the play on words in Latin between Gallus, meaning an inhabitant of Gaul, and gallus, meaning rooster, or cockerel. Its use, by the enemies of France, dates to this period, originally a pun to make fun of the French, the association between the rooster and the Gauls/French was developed by the kings of France for the strong Christian symbol that the rooster represents: prior to being arrested, Jesus predicted that Peter would deny him three times before the rooster crowed on the following morning. At the rooster's crowing, Peter remembered Jesus's words. Its crowing at the dawning of each new morning made it a symbol of the daily victory of light over darkness and the triumph of good over evil. It is also an emblem of the Christian's attitude of watchfulness and readiness for the sudden return of Christ, the resurrection of the dead, and the final judgment of humankind. That is why, during the Renaissance, the rooster became a symbol of France as a Catholic state and became a popular Christian image on weather vanes, also known as weathercocks.

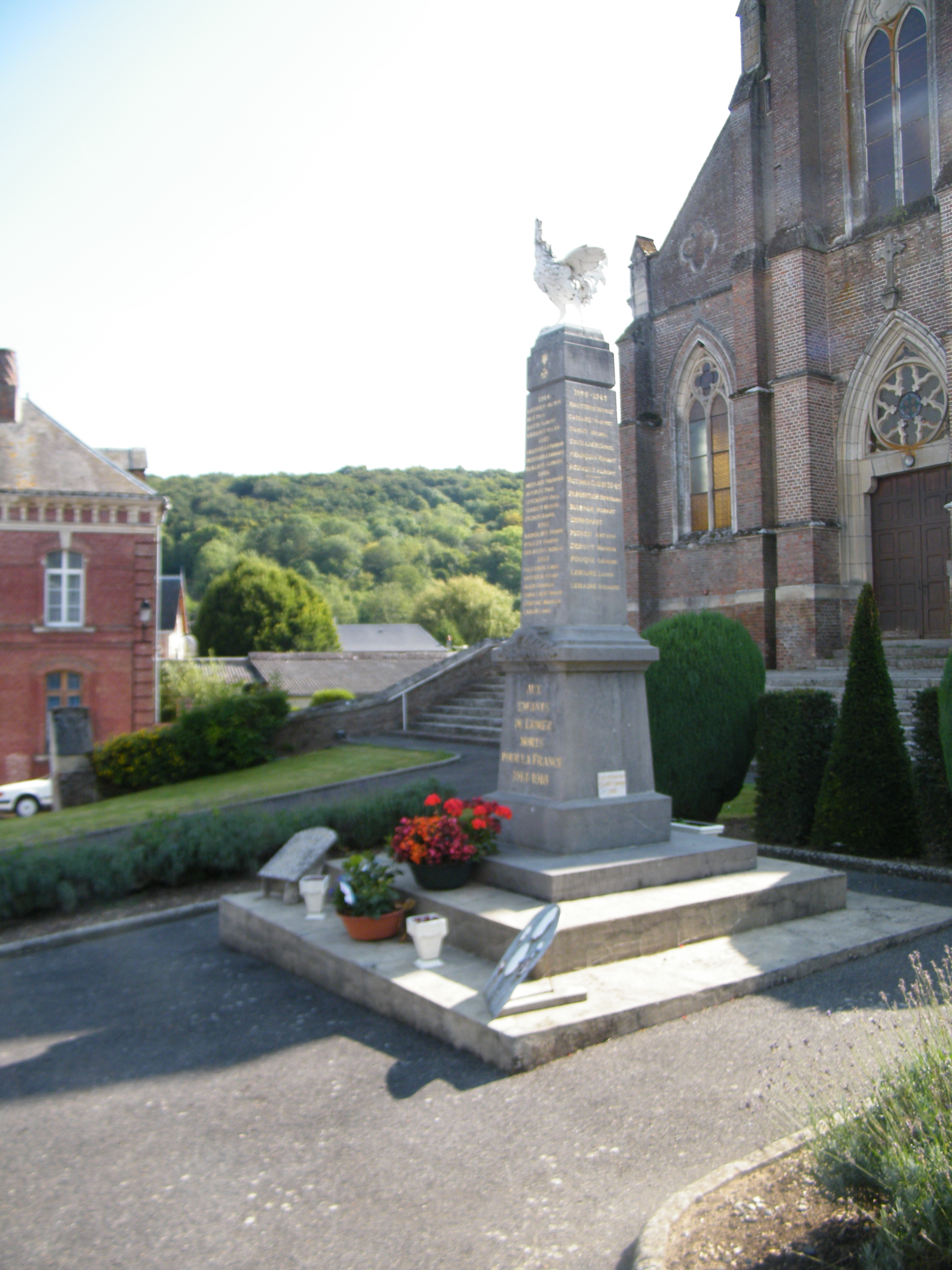
Gallic rooster atop a World War I memorial, Liomer (Somme).

The popularity of the Gallic rooster as a national personification faded away until its resurgence during the French Revolution (1789). The republican historiography completely modified the traditional perception of the origins of France. Until then, the royal historiography dated the origins of France back to the baptism of Clovis I in 496, the "first Christian king of France". The republicans rejected this royalist and Christian origin of the country and trace the origins of France back to the ancient Gaul. Although purely apocryphal, the rooster became the personification of the early inhabitants of France, the Gauls.

The Gallic rooster, colloquially named Chantecler, had been a national emblem ever since, especially during the Third Republic. The rooster was featured on the reverse of French 20-franc gold pieces from 1899 to 1914. After World War I it was depicted on countless war memorials.

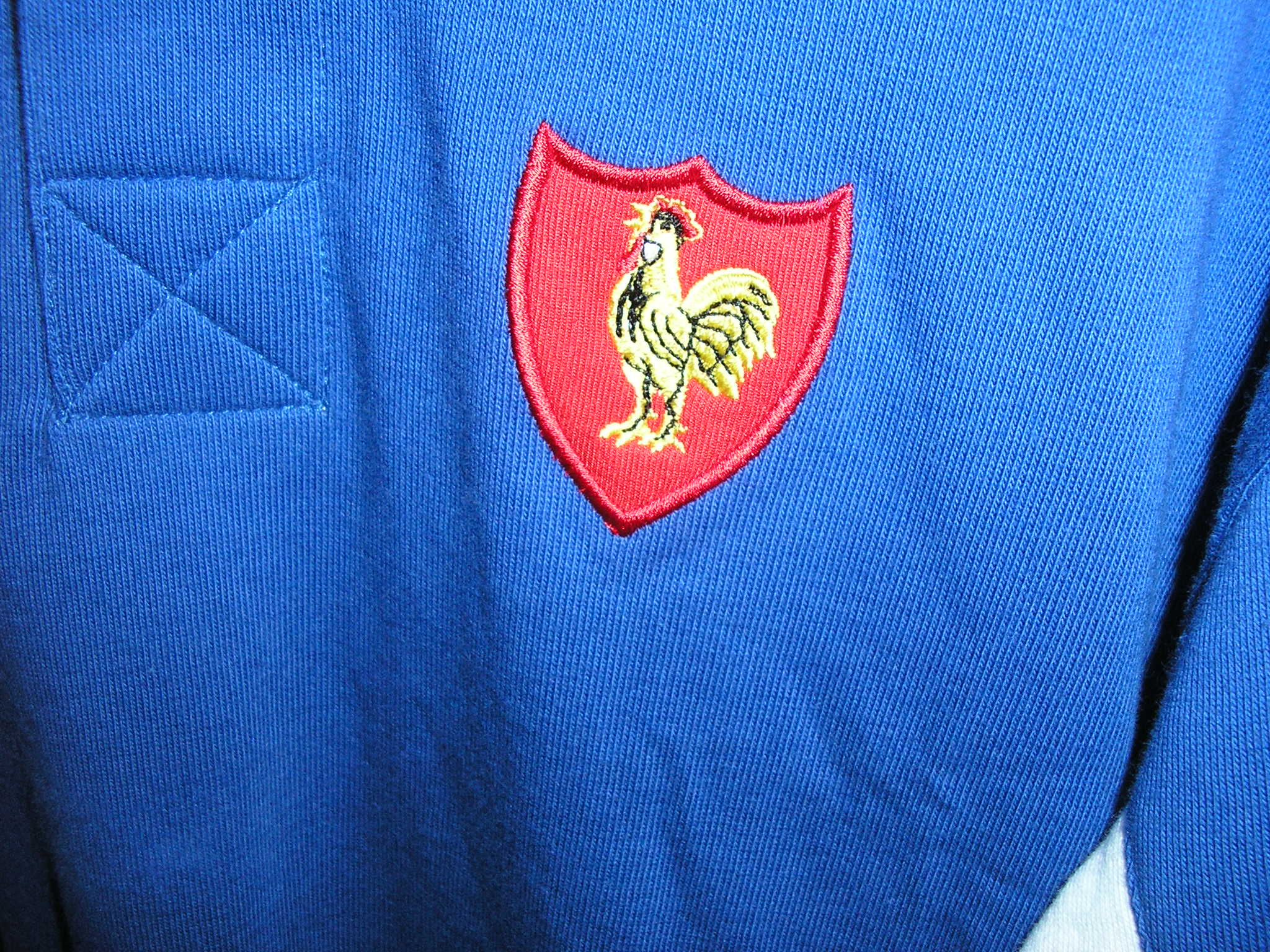
The jersey of the French national rugby team, with the traditional Gallic rooster symbol

Today, it is often used as a national mascot, particularly in sporting events such as football (soccer) and rugby. The 1998 FIFA World Cup, hosted by France, adopted an anthropomorphic rooster named Footix as its mascot. Two decades later, the 2019 FIFA Women's World Cup, also hosted by France, featured a young anthropomorphic female chicken known as ettie (officially in lower case) as its mascot, with ettie being depicted as the daughter of Footix. The France national rugby league team are known as the Chanteclairs, referring to the cockerel's song.

The popularity of the symbol extends into business through several notable brands:

- Le Coq Sportif ("The athletic rooster"), a French manufacturer of sports equipment using a stylized rooster and the colors of the French tricolour as its logo,
- the logo of Pathé, a French-born, now international company of film production and distribution,
- Ayam Brand, an Asia-wide food company based in Singapore founded by a Frenchman in 1892 formerly known as "A. Clouet & Co.", the name came from the Malay word ayam meaning "chicken" in reference to the rooster adorning many of the Clouet products at the time.

Another heraldic animal officially used by the French nation was the French Imperial Eagle, symbol of the First and Second French Empire under Napoleon I and Napoleon III, as well as the bee. There was also the Salamander which was used under Francis I of France.

== Wallonia ==
The Walloon rooster.

Inspired by the French example, a rooster was adopted as the symbol of Walloon movement in 1913. It represents a "bold rooster" (coq hardi), raising its claws, instead of the "crowing rooster" that is traditionally depicted in France. This symbol, also known as the Walloon rooster, was officially adopted as the symbol of Wallonia (in 1998) and the French Community of Belgium (in 1991).

== Cocorico ==
In France, the French onomatopoeia for the rooster crowing sound, "cocorico" (cock-a-doodle-doo), is sometimes used as an expression of national pride, sometimes ironically.

== See also ==
- Rooster of Barcelos
